= Orthodontic Technicians Association =

Orthodontic Technicians Association (UK)
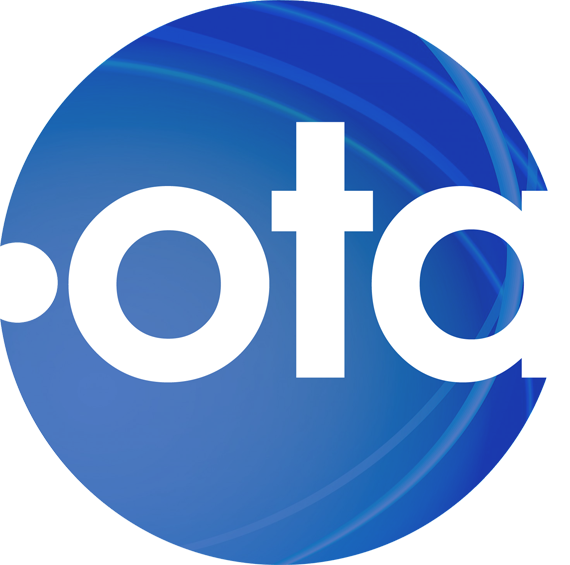
- Formation: 11 October 1971; 54 years ago Great Ormond Street Hospital, London WC1N 3JH
- Type: professional association
- Headquarters: 12 Bridewell Place; London EC4V 6AP
- Location: United Kingdom
- President: Bill Ip
- Key people: Jennifer Alexander; Chair James Green; Secretary Kerry Lancaster; Treasurer Kirsty Galt; Membership Secretary
- Affiliations: British Orthodontic Society; Gesellschaft für Kieferorthopädische Zahntechnik e.V (GK; Society for Orthodontic Dental Technology); Accademia Italiana di Ortodonzia Tecnica (AIOT; Italian Academy of Orthodontic Technology); ORTEC; Polskie Towarzystwo Techniki Ortodontycznej (PTTO; Polish Association for Orthodontic Technology)
- Website: https://www.ota-uk.com

The Orthodontic Technicians Association (UK) (OTA) is the professional body that represents orthodontic technologists, based in the United Kingdom.

== History ==
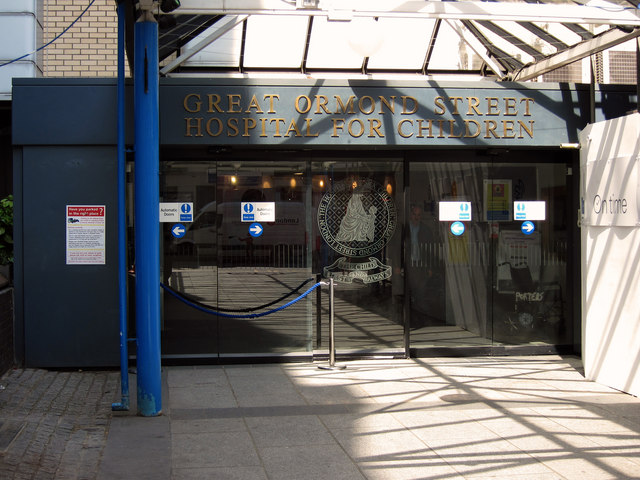
Great Ormond Street Hospital for Children in London was the site of the first OTA meeting in 1971.

In 1971, orthodontic technicians based at London teaching hospitals began holding meetings to discuss the regulation of orthodontic technology, and the ways in which standards in the profession could be improved. Bert Aldridge, laboratory manager at Great Ormond Street Hospital in London, and Len Bradshaw, his counterpart at Kings College Dental School, discussed the possibility of forming an association for orthodontic technicians. Aldridge and Bradshaw were also lecturers in orthodontics at South London College on Tooley Street, which has since merged with Brixton College of Further Education and Vauxhall College to become Lambeth College (the Tooley Street campus moved to Clapham in 2004). Aldridge wrote to the other orthodontic technicians working at London teaching hospitals and invited them to attend a meeting on Monday, 11 October 1971 at 6.00 pm at Great Ormond Street Hospital to discuss the possibility of forming an association. Thirteen orthodontic technicians attended the meeting, and it was agreed that such an association should be formed. During the meetings that followed, the constitution was written, and the first conference was planned, which was held in April 1973, at University College Hospital in London. Letters with details of the conference were sent out to all orthodontic departments throughout the United Kingdom.

== Membership ==
=== Membership benefits ===
- Full access to the OTA website and Virtual Learning Environment (VLE).
- Subscriptions to OTA News, the OTA newsletter and BOS News, the newsletter of the British Orthodontic Society (BOS).
- Discounted subscription rate for the Journal of Orthodontics.
- Discounted rates for the Dental Professionals Conference (DPC) and British Orthodontic Conference (BOC).
- Access to Dental Technology Showcase (DTS) VIP area.

== OTA officials ==
=== President ===
The president is the Association's ceremonial head and is elected biennially by the council. The position was created in 1974 and was first held by Professor Norman Robertson, who was professor of orthodontics at Cardiff University. The current president is Bill Ip, consultant orthodontist at the Newcastle upon Tyne Hospitals NHS Foundation Trust.

=== Council ===
The OTA Council is the governing body of the Association and is elected by the membership. The council was established in 1971, consisting of four executive officers (Chair, Secretary, Treasurer and Membership Secretary) and up to six non-executive council members. At the Annual General Meeting on 12 March 2005 two more non-executive positions were created due to a steady increase in council duties, meaning that the council can be composed of a total of 12 council members.

=== OTA officials 2023–24 ===
Portfolio	Name
President	Bill Ip
Chair	Jennifer Alexander
Secretary	James Green
Treasurer	Kerry Lancaster
Membership Secretary	Kirsty Galt
Council member	John Brown
Council member	Jennifer Dunnett
Council member (co-opted)	Richard Eggleton
Council member (co-opted)	Edward Malton
Council member	Jinesh Patel
Council member	Wakeel Shah
Council member	Kelly Tuplin
Council member (co-opted)	Jeffrey Lewis

=== Representation ===
The OTA is represented at meetings with organizations such as the British Standards Institution and the General Dental Council.

== Logo and visual identity ==
The OTA logo has been a visual identity for the Association and its work since the 1970s in three distinct designs:

=== 1971–89 ===
The first logo was used for 18 years from 1971 to 1989 and was designed by Bert Aldridge. It consisted of an image of the base of a maxillary Angle's trimmed study model surrounded by an annulus with the words "ORTHODONTIC" and "TECHNICIANS" at the top and "ASSOCIATION" at the bottom, separated by dashes.

=== 1989–2017 ===
The second logo was used for 28 years from 1989 to 2017 and was designed by council members Vaughan Jones and Desmond Solomon. It depicts the letters "OTA " in uppercase with an otter, the OTA's mascot, in the foreground. The annulus remained the same as for the first logo. The otter was chosen as the association's mascot because the initials OTA can be pronounced "otter."

=== 2017–present ===
The third and current logo has been used since September 2017 and consists of a blue globe with a "bite" removed from the left-hand side and the letters "OTA" in lowercase.

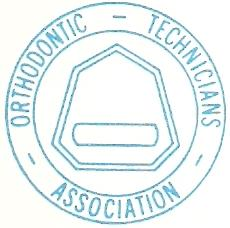
1971–1989:
The first logo

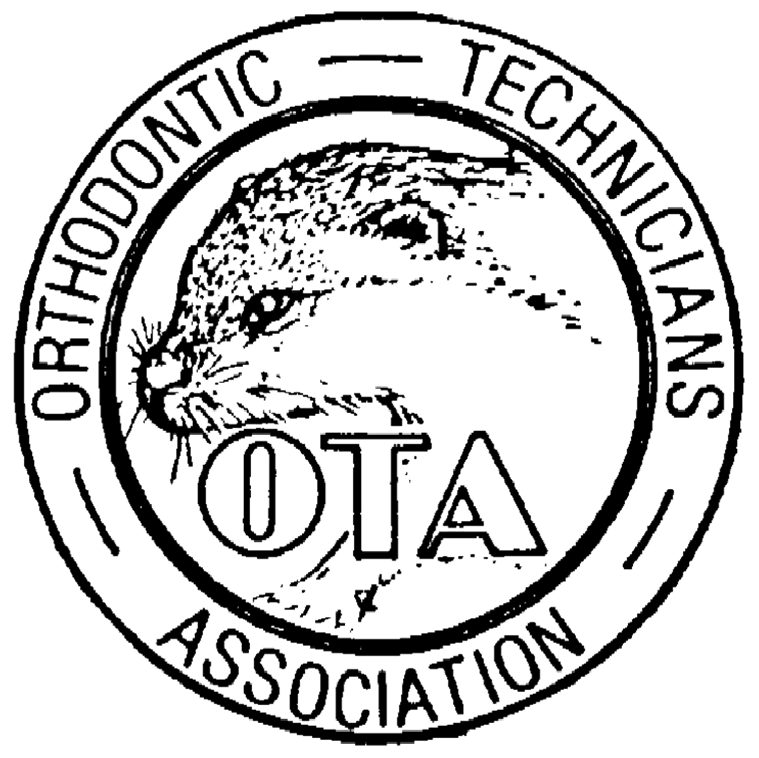
1989–2017:
The second logo

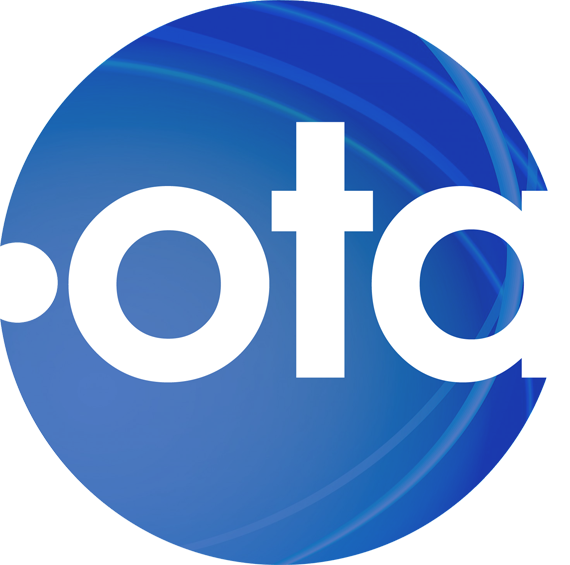
2017–present:
The third logo

== Affiliate organizations ==
=== British Orthodontic Society ===
The OTA has had a close connection with the British Orthodontic Society (BOS) for much of its history. The BOS sponsor two awards for orthodontic technicians, which were launched in 2000 and 2003, and these are coordinated by the OTA. The affiliation with the BOS was finally formalised by an agreement in 2010 that gave increased benefits to members and meant that the Association now shared an official address with the BOS at 12 Bridewell Place in the City of London. These offices opened in 2006 and occupy two floors of a listed Victorian building near St Paul's Cathedral.

=== International affiliations ===
The 1990s saw the Association build links with a similar organization based in (Germany), Gesellschaft für Kieferorthopädische Zahntechnik (GK; Society for Orthodontic Dental Technology), which was established in 1990. This relationship remains in place today and the OTA Chair with an accompanying ambassador from the OTA council represents the OTA at the annual GK Congress. The second decade of the 21st century has seen the OTA build links with their Italian and Polish counterparts, Accademia Italiana di Ortodonzia Tecnica, (AIOT; Italian Academy of Orthodontic Technology), ORTEC and Polskie Towarzystwo Techniki Ortodontycznej (PTTO; Polish Association for Orthodontic Technology).

== Conference ==
Continuing professional development (CPD) has been at the heart of what the OTA stands for, long before it became mandatory for UK dental technicians in 2008. The Association has held regular conferences since 1973.

=== OTA Annual Conference (1973–2014) ===
The first OTA conference (OTAC) was held at University College Hospital, London in April 1973. The next three conferences were held in 1974, 1976 and 1978 in Cardiff, Manchester and Bristol respectively. Conferences have become a regular occurrence for the Association since the 1980s, with meetings held in towns and cities including Basingstoke, Blackpool, Bournemouth, Edinburgh, Glasgow, Gloucester, Luton, Milton Keynes, Newcastle, Skipton, Southampton, Stirling and Windermere.

=== OTA Annual Conference, co-located with the British Orthodontic Conference (2016–2017) ===
Following a ballot of the OTA membership, the result of which was announced at the OTA Annual General Meeting in 2014, the OTA Conference moved to be co-located with the British Orthodontic Conference (BOC) in 2016 and 2017. These conferences were held in Brighton and Manchester.

=== Dental Professionals Conference (2018–2020) ===
In 2018, the OTA Conference was opened up to the wider dental team and rebranded as the Dental Professionals Conference (DPC). The OTA hosted the event in collaboration with the Dental Technologists Association, the Society of British Dental Nurses and Futurelab. The first DPC was held at Park Plaza Hotel in Nottingham on the 14 and 15 September 2018 and the second took place at the Holiday Inn hotel in Edinburgh on 27–28 September 2019. The third DPC has held online via videoconferencing software due to the COVID-19 pandemic.

=== OTA Annual Conference (2021–present) ===
In 2021, the conference returned to its original format. The 50th Anniversary conference was held at the Marriott Hotel in Liverpool, home of the Adams clasp, and the 2022 conference was held at the Park Inn by Radisson Hotel in York.

== Other events ==
=== British Orthodontic Conference ===
Between 2009 and 2014, the BOS hosted a dedicated lecture program for orthodontic technicians at the BOC, which was coordinated by the OTA. These meetings were held in Edinburgh, Brighton, Harrogate, Bournemouth and Manchester.

=== International Orthodontic Congress ===
In 2015, the OTA hosted the orthodontic technicians lecture program at the 8th International Orthodontic Congress at ExCeL in London.

=== Dental Technology Showcase ===
Since 2016, the OTA have held seminar sessions at the Dental Technology Showcase (DTS). The DTS is co-located with the British Dental Conference and the Dentistry Show at the National Exhibition Centre in Birmingham. The DTS was cancelled in 2020 and 2021 due to the COVID-19 pandemic, but the event returned in 2022.

=== Scottish Dental Show ===
Between 2016 and 2019 the OTA sponsored a speaker and had a trade stand at the Scottish Dental Show, which is held at the Braehead Arena in Renfrewshire. The Scottish Dental Show is expected to return in 2022.

== Publications ==
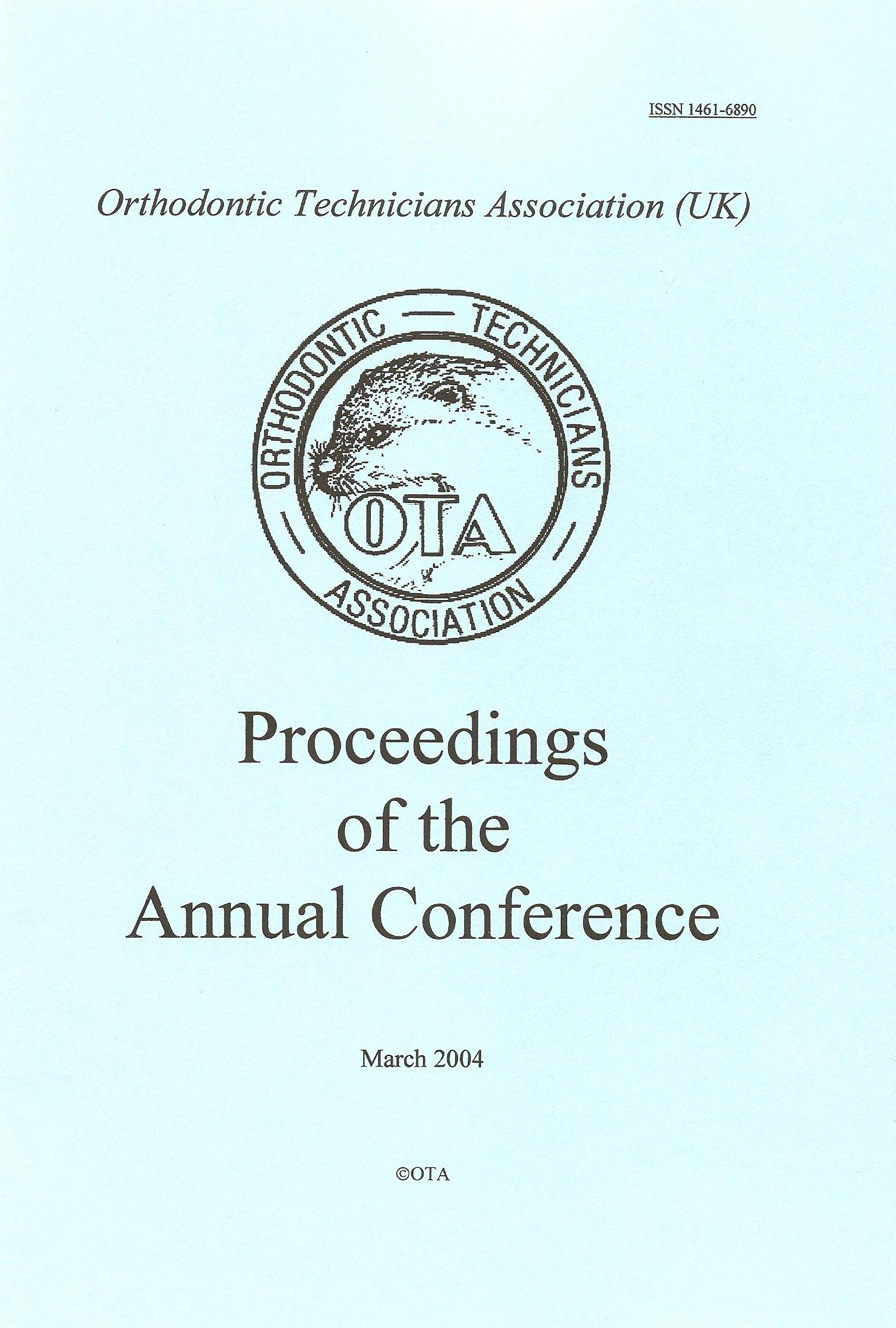
OTA Conference Proceedings from 2004

=== Conference proceedings ===
The OTA have published conference proceedings to accompany its annual conference since 1998.

=== OTA News ===
The OTA publishes a quarterly newsletter to keep members up to date with news relating to orthodontic technology.

=== BOS News ===
The BOS News, the newsletter of the BOS, carries up to four pages of news relating to the OTA.

== Prizes and awards ==
The OTA sponsor three awards and coordinate two on behalf of the BOS:

Year Established	Award	Sponsor	Aim	Eligibility	Prize
1990	Fellowship of the Orthodontic Technicians Association.	OTA	To recognise a member or past member for their years of service to orthodontic technology or for their distinguished ability or originality in their field.	A member or past member that the OTA Council deems to merit this recognition.	A framed certificate
2000	BOS Technicians / Student Technician Award.	BOS	To encourage student dental technicians and recently qualified dental technicians to pursue a career in orthodontic technology.	Those undertaking a recognised first level dental technology course in the United Kingdom and dental technicians who have been qualified for less than two years at the time of the closing date.	A certificate and £750
2003	BOS Award to an Orthodontic Technician for Distinguished Service	BOS	To recognise orthodontic technicians who have made an outstanding contribution to their profession and orthodontics.	An orthodontic technician nominated by the OTA.	A certificate and a glass bowl
2007	Aldridge Medal	OTA	To encourage members to present new research and developments at the annual conference.	The best lecturer at the conference, as judged by delegates who are OTA members.	A medal
2017	OTA Award for an outstanding contribution to the field of orthodontic dental technology	OTA	To recognise a specific contribution that has advanced the field of orthodontic technology.	Any person nominated by the OTA.	A certificate and a glass plaque

== In other media ==
The OTA council were featured on the BBC News website in June 2002 in an item about kilts, following the 2001 OTA conference in Stirling. Council members featured were (from left to right) Bob Woods, John Windibank, Ed Payne, John Brown, Gavin Carmichael, Paul Mallett and Chris Bridle.

== See also ==
- Orthodontic technology
- British Orthodontic Society
- List of medicine awards
