= Harold Gladstone Watkin =

English orthodontist

Harold Gladstone Watkin (born 17 January 1882 in Burslem, Stoke-on-Trent, died 11 November 1965), known by many of his contemporaries as "Watty", is considered one of the most pioneering English orthodontists of the early 20th century.

== Life ==
He started working at the Equipment Department of the National Telephone Company and helped develop the first fully automatic telephone exchange in Staffordshire Potteries that opened in 1904. He then built his own X-ray machine and took the earliest known radiograph in Stoke-on-Trent for Mr. King Alcock, F.R.C.S., a local surgeon, who had a female patient who worked in a textile factory and the end of a machine needle had snapped off in her finger.

In 1914, Watkin came to Liverpool where he studied at the Liverpool School of Dental Surgery and qualified in 1918. Then until 1930, he practiced in Liverpool. He worked as a general dental with special interest was orthodontics. In 1921, he became a member of the British Society for the Study of Orthodontics (BSSO) and a member of European Orthodontic Society (EOS) in 1926. Watkin performed the first successful jaw resection operation in the UK in 1928.

Watkin set up a specialist orthodontic practice in Liverpool in 1930. At the time there were only two other such orthodontic specialist practices in UK, one in London and the other one in Dublin. With a growing reputation as an outstanding clinician, in 1933, he became President of the British Society for the Study of Orthodontics. In his BSSO presidential address he discussed the problems associated with welding steel wire and the importance of considering the influence of soft tissue when undertaking orthodontic correction. Both of these points put him ahead of the field and contributed to his success.

In 1934, he was elected as President of the Liverpool Odontological Society, and in 1937, of the West Lancashire, West Cheshire and North Wales Branch of the British Dental Association.

== Watkin Orthodontic Appliances ==
In the early years of orthodontics, removable appliances (plates) were commonly used as an alternative to the more expensive and complex fixed appliances. One such appliance that fascinated Watkin and had potential for development was the Pin and Tube Appliance. The Pin and Tube Appliance was time-consuming and therefore expensive to construct. It lacked flexibility and needed adjusting every two to three weeks. Trauma to the teeth could only be avoided by very careful handling. These shortcomings concerned Watkin so he devised an adaptation, not only addressing these problems, but also endowing his appliance with extra beneficial features. He replaced the rather rigid 'pin' with a 'loop and tube' attachment permitting three-dimensional control of the tooth and extending the periods between adjustments to six weeks and provided means for quick arch-wire removal, cleaning, adjustment and reinsertion. The implications for the patients were great as it meant that they needed fewer appointments and those they had were shorter.

In 1934, high tensile stainless steel became available giving the appliances increased efficiency and flexibility, enabling the need for clinical adjustment to be extended to eight-week periods.

The Watkin Appliance eventually developed into two distinct types; the Loop and Tube Appliance and the Free-Sliding Arch.

The Free-Sliding Arch was essentially a loop and tube appliance at the front but the correcting wires extended backwards to a banded molar on each side of the mouth.

His appliances relied on bends and coils in the correcting wire so it was necessary to have specific pliers made for the purpose so local toolmakers, Elliots of Buckland Street Aigburth, Liverpool, produced the Watkin Pliers commercially. The Dental Manufacturing Company in London also sold Watkin Pliers.

== The Watkin Welder ==
In the 1930s, the invention of the spot welder by Watkin allowed a much greater success rate when soldering fine wires, especially steel. Elliot's of Liverpool produced the welder commercially and promoted it in the instruction manual: "The Watkin welder has been designed by an eminent orthodontist essentially for the speedy and efficient welding of stainless steel wire and tape. Weighing only 35lbs, it is completely portable. The Watkin Welder has proved invaluable to other professions, and is used extensively in the engineering, electrical and allied trades." The Watkin Welder sold widely and it was used by the valve maker Mullard and by leading orthodontists, clinicians and hospitals throughout the world for twenty-five years until an electronic spot welder superseded it. Watkin did become wealthy through its sales but as he did not believe in patents he did not make the great fortune he perhaps deserved. Modern spot welders still have more than a passing resemblance to his original design, especially in the rotating star head section.

On 11 November 1965, he died at the age of 83 years, the day after seeing a full list of patients. His old office at 84 Rodney Street was renamed Watkin House about 10 years after his death and a padded upholstered seat in lecture theatre was named after him when Manchester Dental Hospital refurbished the post-graduate room around 1980.

== Recognition ==
- Liverpool and District Odontological Society - President (1965)
- British Dental Association - Life Membership (1961)
- Developed Watkin Dental Vibrator
