= Facial width to height ratio =

Aspect of a person's face

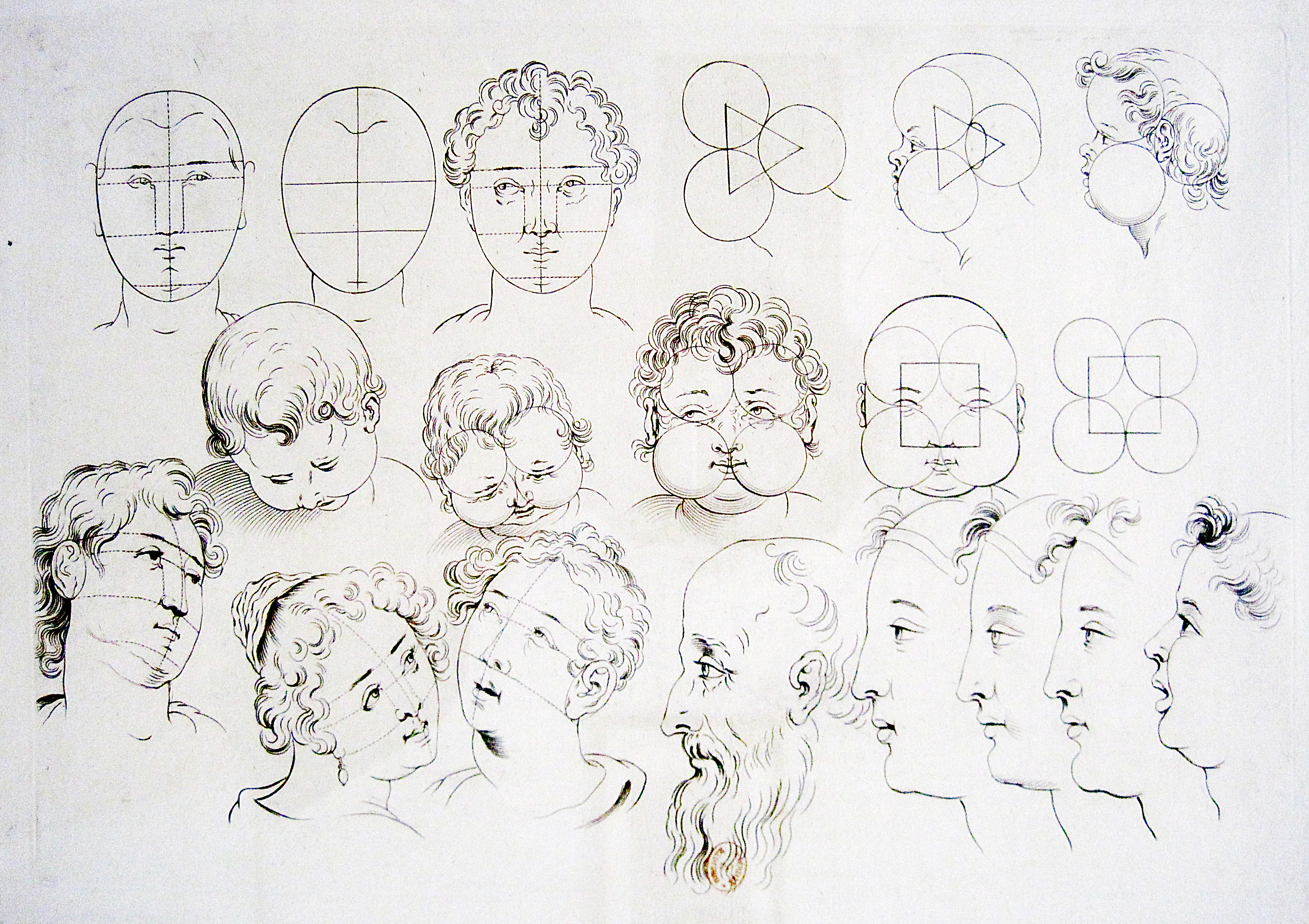
"Proportions of the Human Face" by Paulus Pontius in 1640

Facial width to height ratio (fWHR) is a measure of the width of a person's face compared to its height. Research has shown that higher FWHR is associated with various physical and behavioral traits, such as adolescent testosterone, aggression, attractiveness to women, cause of death by violence, CEO success as measured by organizational and financial performance, and success in sports. While most studies have found some significance, other studies found little correlation. The metric has also been used in primate studies with similar findings.

Width is measured as upper bizygomatic width (the widest central bit of the face), height measurement used is upper facial height, from the top of the eyelids (approximately the nasion) to the top lip. This can cause experimental error when working from photographs in historical studies due to facial expressions.

== See also ==
- Cephalometry
- Sexual dimorphism
- Face
- Skull
