= Regius Professor of Anatomy =

Regius Professor of Anatomy is the title of a chair held at a two universities in Scotland.

- Regius Professor of Anatomy (Aberdeen), for the University of Aberdeen
- Regius Professor of Anatomy (Glasgow), for the University of Glasgow

== See also ==
- Regius Professor, for similar professorships
