= FC6 =

FC6 may refer to:

- Fedora (operating system)
- FC6: an EEG electrode site according to the 10-20 system
- Far Cry 6
