= Cephalometric analysis =

Clinical application of cephalometry (measurement of parts of the head)

Cephalometric analysis is the clinical application of cephalometry. It is analysis of the dental and skeletal relationships of a human skull. It is frequently used by dentists, orthodontists, and oral and maxillofacial surgeons as a treatment planning tool. Two of the more popular methods of analysis used in orthodontology are the Steiner analysis (named after Cecil C. Steiner) and the Downs analysis (named after William B. Downs). There are other methods as well which are listed below.

== Cephalometric radiographs ==
Cephalometric analysis depends on cephalometric radiography to study relationships between bony and soft tissue landmarks and can be used to diagnose facial growth abnormalities prior to treatment, in the middle of treatment to evaluate progress, or at the conclusion of treatment to ascertain that the goals of treatment have been met. A Cephalometric radiograph is a radiograph of the head taken in a cephalometer (cephalostat) that is a head-holding device introduced in 1931 by Holly Broadbent Sr. in USA. The Cephalometer is used to obtain standardized and comparable craniofacial images on radiographic films.

== Machine and dimensions ==
To carry out cephalometry, the X-ray source is placed a steady five feet away from the mid sagittal plane, with film situated just 15 cm from there. This allows for accurate measurements to be taken and recorded. Distance has a direct impact on cephalometric image magnification. With an object-to-film interval of 15 cm and a source-to-object span of 5 feet, magnification of anatomical landmarks will be reduced in all three dimensions.When attempting to analyze a patient's anatomy through lateral and frontal cephalograms, the challenge arises due to these images being two-dimensional projections of three-dimensional structures. Magnification and distortion as an outcome of traditional radiography further complicates the process by blurring important details.

=== Lateral cephalometric radiographs ===
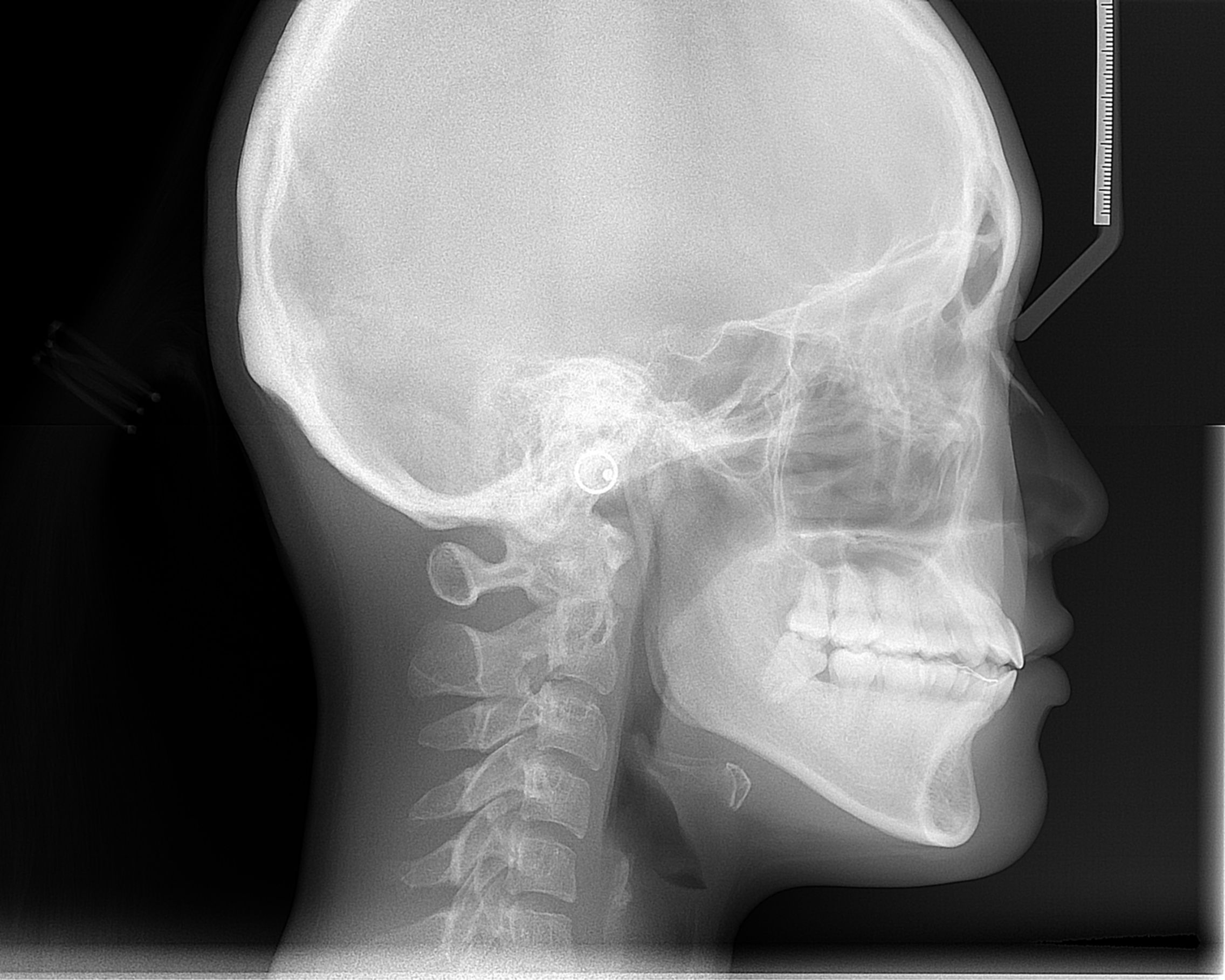
Lateral cephalometric radiograph, used for skull analysis

Lateral cephalometric radiograph is a radiograph of the head taken with the x-ray beam perpendicular to the patient's sagittal plane. Natural head position is a standardized orientation of the head that is reproducible for each individual and is used as a means of standardization during analysis of dentofacial morphology both for photos and radiographs. The concept of natural head position was introduced by Coenraad Moorrees and M. R Kean in 1958 and now is a common method of head orientation for cephalometric radiography.

Registration of the head in its natural position while obtaining a cephalogram has the advantage that an extracranial line (the true vertical or a line perpendicular to that) can be used as a reference line for cephalometric analysis, thus bypassing the difficulties imposed by the biologic variation of intracranial reference lines. True vertical is an external reference line, commonly provided by the image of a free-hanging metal chain on the cephalostat registering on the film or digital cassette during exposure. The true vertical line offers the advantage of no variation (since it is generated by gravity) and is used with radiographs obtained in natural head position.

=== Posteroanterior (P-A) cephalometric radiograph ===
A radiograph of the head taken with the x-ray beam perpendicular to the patient's coronal plane with the x-ray source behind the head and the film cassette in front of the patient's face. PA ceph can be evaluated by following analyses that have been developed through the years:

- Grummon analysis
- MSR
- Hewitt analysis
- Svanholt-Solow analysis
- Grayson analysis

== Cephalometric tracing ==
A cephalometric tracing is an overlay drawing produced from a cephalometric radiograph by digital means and a computer program or by copying specific outlines from it with a lead pencil onto acetate paper, using an illuminated view-box. Tracings are used to facilitate cephalometric analysis, as well as in superimpositions, to evaluate treatment and growth changes. Historically, tracings of the cephalometric radiographs are done on an 0.003 inch thick matte acetate paper by using a #3 pencil. The process is started by marking three registration crosses on the radiograph which are then transferred to the acetate paper.

Anatomical structures are traced first and some structures are bilateral and have tendency to show up as two separate lines, should have an "average" line drawn which is represented as a broken line. These landmarks could include inferior border of mandible.

== Cephalometric landmarks ==
The following are important cephalometric landmarks, which are points of reference serving as datum references in measurement and analysis. (Sources: Proffit; others.)

Landmark points can be joined by lines to form axes, vectors, angles, and planes (a line between 2 points can define a plane by projection). For example, the sella (S) and the nasion (N) are points that together form the sella-nasion line (SN or S-N), which can be projected into the SN plane. A prime symbol (′) usually indicates the point on the skin's surface that corresponds to a given bony landmark (for example, nasion (N) versus skin nasion (N′).

Landmark name	Landmark symbol	Comments
A point (subspinale)	A	Most concave point of anterior maxilla
A point–nasion–B point angle	ANB	Average of 2° ± 2°
B point (supramentale)	B	Most concave point on mandibular symphysis
basion	Ba	Most anterior point on foramen magnum
anterior nasal spine	ANS	Anterior point on maxillary bone
articulare	Ar	Junction between inferior surface of the cranial base and the posterior border of the ascending rami of the mandible
Bolton point		Point at the intersection of the occipital condyle and Foramen Magnum at the highest notch posterior to the occipital condyle
cheilion	Ch	Corner of oral cavity
chresta philtri	Chp	Head of nasal filter
condylion		Most posterior/superior point on the condyle of mandible
dacryon	dac	Point of junction of maxillary bone, lacrimal bone, and frontal bone
endocanthion	En	Point at which inner ends of upper and lower eyelids meet (medial canthal point)
exocanthion (synonym, ectocanthion)	Ex	Point at which outer ends of upper and lower eyelids meet (lateral canthal point)
frontotemporal	Ft	Most medial point on the temporal crest
glabella	G′	Most prominent point in the median sagittal plane between the supraorbital ridges
gnathion	Gn	Point located perpendicular on mandibular symphysis midway between pogonion and menton
gonion	Go	Most posterior inferior point on angle of mandible. Can also be constructed by bisecting the angle formed by intersection of mandibular plane and ramus of mandible
key ridges		Posterior vertical portion and inferior curvature of left and right zygomatic bones
labial inferior	Li	Point denoting vermilion border of lower lip in midsagittal plane
labialis superior	Ls	Point denoting vermilion border of upper lip
lower incisor	L1	Line connecting incisal edge and root apex of the most prominent mandibular incisor
menton	Me	Lowest point on mandibular symphysis
soft tissue menton	Me′	Lowest point on soft tissue over mandible
nasion	N	Most anterior point on frontonasal suture
soft tissue nasion	N′	Point on soft tissue over nasion
odontale		Highest point on second vertebra
orbitale	Or	Most inferior point on margin of orbit
opisthion	Op	Most posterior point of foramen magnum
pogonion	Pg	Most anterior point of mandibular symphysis
soft tissue pogonion	Pg′	Soft tissue over pogonion
porion	Po	Most superior point of outline of external auditory meatus
machine porion		Superior-most point of the image of the ear rod
posterior nasal spine	PNS	Posterior limit of bony palate or maxilla
pronasale (synonyms, pronasal or pronasion)	Prn	Soft tissue point on tip of nose
prosthion (supradentale, superior prosthion)	Pr	The most inferior anterior point on the maxillary alveolar process between the central incisors
PT point	PT	Point at junction between Ptm and foramen rotundum (at 11 o'clock from Ptm)
pterygomaxillary fissure	Ptm	Point at base of fissure where anterior and posterior wall meet. Anterior wall represents posterior surface of maxillary tuberosity
registration point		A reference point for superimposition of ceph tracings
sella (that is, sella turcica)	S	Midpoint of sella turcica
sphenoethmoidal suture	SE	the cranial suture between the sphenoid bone and the ethmoid bone
sella–nasion line	SN or S–N	Line from sella to nasion
sella–nasion–A point angle	SNA or S-N-A	Average of 82 degrees with +/- of 2 degrees
sella–nasion–B point angle	SNB or S-N-B	Average of 80 degrees with +/- of 2 degrees
sublabialis	Sl	
subnasale (synonyms, subnasal or subnasion)	Sn	In the midline, the junction where base of the columella of the nose meets the upper lip
stomion inferius	Sti	Highest midline point of lower lip
stomion superius	Sts	Highest midline point of upper lip
throat point		Junction of inferior border of mandible and throat
tragion	T′	Notch above the tragus of the ear where the upper edge of the cartilage disappears into the skin of the face
trichion	Tr	Midline of hairline
upper incisor	U1	A line connecting the incisal edge and root apex of the most prominent maxillary incisor
xi point	Xi	An approximate point for inferior alveolar foramen

=== Cephalometric planes ===
Cephalometric planes are commonly used in different cephalometric analyses.

Cephalometric plane	Plane symbol	Definition
palatal plane	ANS-PNS	This plane is formed by connecting ANS to PNS and is used to measure the vertical tilt of maxilla
SN plane	SN plane	This plane represents the anterior cranial base and is formed by projecting a plane from the sella-nasion line
Frankfort horizontal plane (Frankfurt horizontal plane)	P-Or	This plane represents the habitual postural position of the head.
condylar plane	Co-Or	This plane can be used as an alternate to Frankfort horizontal plane.
functional occlusal plane	FOP	This plane passes is formed by drawing a line that touches the posterior premolars and molars.
Downs occlusal plane	DOP	This plane is formed by bisecting the anterior incisors and the distal cusps of the most posterior in occlusion.
mandibular plane	Go-Gn	This plane is formed by connecting the point gonion to gnathion at the inferior border of the mandible.
facial plane	N-Pg	This vertical plane is formed by connecting nasion to pogonion as described in the Schudy analysis.
Bolton plane	This plane is formed by connecting the Bolton point to nasion. This plane includes the registration point and is part of the Bolton triangle.	

== Classification of analyses ==
The basic elements of analysis are angles and distances. Measurements (in degrees or millimetres) may be treated as absolute or relative, or they may be related to each other to express proportional correlations. The various analyses may be grouped into the following:

1. Angular – dealing with angles
2. Linear – dealing with distances and lengths
3. Coordinate – involving the Cartesian (X, Y) or even 3-D planes
4. Arcial – involving the construction of arcs to perform relational analyses

These in turn may be grouped according to the following concepts on which normal values have been based:

1. Mononormative analyses: averages serve as the norms for these and may be arithmetical (average figures) or geometrical (average tracings), e.g. Bolton Standards
2. Multinormative: for these a whole series of norms are used, with age and sex taken into account, e.g. Bolton Standards
3. Correlative: used to assess individual variations of facial structure to establish their mutual relationships, e.g. the Sassouni arcial analysis

== Cephalometric angles ==
According to the Steiner analysis:

- ANB (A point, nasion, B point) indicates whether the skeletal relationship between the maxilla and mandible is a normal skeletal class I (+2 degrees), a skeletal Class II (+4 degrees or more), or skeletal class III (0 or negative) relationship.
- SNA (sella, nasion, A point) indicates whether or not the maxilla is normal, prognathic, or retrognathic.
- SNB (sella, nasion, B point) indicates whether or not the mandible is normal, prognathic, or retrognathic.

SNA and SNB is important to determine what type of intervention (on maxilla, mandible or both) is appropriate. These angles, however are influenced also by the vertical height of the face and a possible abnormal positioning of nasion. By using a comparative set of angles and distances, measurements can be related to one another and to normative values to determine variations in a patient's facial structure.

== Analyses (analytic approaches) by various authors ==
=== Steiner analysis ===
Cecil C. Steiner developed Steiner Analysis in 1953. He used S–N plane as his reference line in comparison to FH plane due to difficulty in identifying the orbitale and porion. Some of the drawbacks of the Steiner analysis includes its reliability on the point nasion. Nasion as a point is known not to be stable due to its growth early in life. Therefore, a posteriorly positioned nasion will increase ANB and more anterior positioned nasion can decrease ANB. In addition, short S–N plane or steeper S–N plane can also lead to greater numbers of SNA, SNB and ANB which may not reflect the true position of the jaws compare to the cranial base. In addition, clockwise rotation of both jaws can increase ANB and counter-clockwise rotation of jaws can decrease ANB.

Name	Description	Normal	Standard Deviation
Skeletal			
SNA (°)	Sella-Nasion to A Point Angle	82 degrees	+/- 2
SNB (°)	Sella-Nasion to B Point Angle	80 degrees	+/- 2
ANB (°)	A point to B Point Angle	2 degrees	+/- 2
Occlusal Plane to SN (°)	SN to Occlusal Plane Angle	14 degrees	
Mandibular Plane (°)	SN to Mandibular Plane Angle	32 degrees	
Dental			
U1-NA (degree)	Angle between upper incisor to NA line	22 degrees	
U1-NA (mm)	Distance from upper incisor to NA line	4 mm	
L1-NB (degree)	Angle between lower incisor to NB line	25 degrees	
L1-NB (mm)	Distance from lower incisor to NB line	4 mm	
U1-L1 (°)	Upper incisor to lower incisor angle	130 degrees	
L1-Chin (mm)	Also known as Holdaway Ratio. It states that chin prominence should be as far away as the farthest point of the lower incisor should be. An ideal distance is 2mm from Pogonion to NB line and L1 to NB line.	4mm	
Soft tissue			
S Line	Line formed by connecting Soft Tissue Pogonion and middle of an S formed by lower border of the nose	Ideally, both lips should touch the S line	

=== Wits analysis ===
The name Wits is short for Witwatersrand, which is a University in South Africa. Jacobsen in 1975 published an article called "The Wits appraisal of jaw disharmony". This analysis was created as a diagnostic aid to measure the disharmony between the AP degree. The ANB angle can be affected by multitude of environmental factors such as:

1. Patient's age where ANB has tendency to reduce with age
2. Change in position of nasion as pubertal growth takes place
3. Rotational effect of jaws
4. Degree of facial prognathism

Therefore, it measured the AP positions of the jaw to each other. This analysis calls for 1. Drawing an occlusal plane through the overlapping cusps of molars and premolars. 2. Draw perpendicular lines connecting A point and B Point to the occlusal plane 3. Label the points as AO and BO.

In his study, Jacobsen mentioned that average jaw relationship is -1mm in Males (AO is behind BO by 1mm) and 0mm in Females (AO and BO coincide). Its clinical significance is that in a Class 2 skeletal patient, AO is located ahead of BO. In skeletal Class 3 patient, BO is located ahead of AO. Therefore, the greater the wits reading, the greater the jaw discrepancy.

Drawbacks to Wits analysis includes:

- Left and right molar outlines may not always coincide
- Occlusal plane may differ in mixed vs permanent dentition
- If curve of spee is deep then it may be difficult to create a straight occlusal plane
- Angulation of functional occlusal plane to pterygomaxillary vertical plane was shown to decrease from age 4 to 24.

=== Delaire analysis ===
Prof. Jean Delaire started developing his analysis along with Dr M. Salagnac back in the 70's. This analysis is still developed and improved by his pupils. This analysis is based on reciprocal proportion and balance and doesn't use standard deviation. It gives the ideal architecture the patient should have, based on his skull shape, posture and functions.

=== Downs analysis ===
Name	Description	Normal	Standard Deviation
Skeletal			
Facial Angle (°)	Angle between Nasion-Pogonion and Frankfurt Horizontal Line	87.8	+/- 3.6
Angle of Convexity (°)	Angle between Nasion – A point and A point – Pogonion Line	0	+/- 5.1
Mandibular Plane Angle (°)	Angle between Frankfort horizontal line and the line intersecting Gonion-Menton	21.9	+/- 5
Y Axis (°)	Sella Gnathion to Frankfurt Horizontal Plane	59.4	+/- 3.8
A-B Plane Angle (°)	Point A-Point B to Nasion-Pogonion Angle	−4.6	+/- 4.6
Dental			
Cant of Occlusal Plane (°)	Angle of cant of occlusal plane in relation to FH Plane	9.3	+/- 3.8
Inter-Incisal Angle (°)		135.4	+/- 5.8
Incisor Occlusal Plane Angle (°)	Angle between line through long axis of Lower Incisor and occlusal Plane	14.5	+/- 3.5
Incisor Mandibular Plane Angle (°)	Angle between line through long axis of Lower incisor and Mandibular Plane	1.4	+/- 3.8
U1 to A-Pog Line (mm)		2.7	+/- 1.8

=== Bjork analysis ===
This analysis by Arne Bjork was developed in 1947 based on 322 Swedish boys and 281 conscripts. He introduced a facial polygon which was based on 5 angles and is listed below. Bjork also developed the 7 structural signs which indicates the mandibular rotator type.

- Nasion Angle - Formed by line connecting ANS to Nasion to Sella
- Saddle or Cranial Base Angle - Formed by line connecting Nasion to Sella to Articulare
- Articular Angle - Formed by line connecting Sella to Articulare to Gonion
- Gonial Angle – Formed by line connecting Articulare to Gonion to Gnathion
- Chin Angle – Formed by line connecting Infradentale to Pogonion to the Mandibular Plane.

=== Tweed analysis (triangle) ===
Charles H. Tweed developed his analysis in the year 1966. In this analysis, he tried describing the lower incisor position in relation to the basal bone and the face. This is described by 3 planes. He used Frankfurt Horizontal plane as a reference line.

Name	Description	Normal
Tweed facial triangle		
IMPA (°)	Angle between long axis of lower incisor and mandibular plane angle	90 (°) +/- 5
FMIA (°)	Frankfort mandibular incisor angle	65 (°)
FMA (°)	Frankfort mandibular plane angle	25 (°)
	Total	180 (°)

=== Jarabak analysis ===
Analysis developed by Joseph Jarabak in 1972. The analysis interprets how the craniofacial growth may affect the pre and post treatment dentition. The analysis is based on 5 points: Nasion (Na), Sella (S), Menton (Me), Go (Gonion) and Articulare (Ar). They together make a Polygon on a face when connected with lines. These points are used to study the anterior/posterior facial height relationships and predict the growth pattern in the lower half of the face. Three important angles used in his analysis are: 1. Saddle Angle - Na, S, Ar 2. Articular Angle - S-Ar-Go, 3. Gonial Angle - Ar-Go-Me.

In a patient who has a clockwise growth pattern, the sum of 3 angles will be higher than 396 degrees. The ratio of posterior height (S-Go) to Anterior Height (N-Me) is 56% to 44%. Therefore, a tendency to open bite will occur and a downward, backward growth of mandible will be observed.

=== Ricketts analysis ===
Landmark Name	Landmark Symbol	Description
Upper Molar	A6	Point on the occlusal plane located perpendicular to the distal surface of the crown of the upper first molar
Lower Molar	B6	Point on the occlusal plane located perpendicular to the distal surface of the crown of the lower first molar
Condyle	CI	A point on the condyle head in contact with and tangent to the ramus plane
Soft Tissue	DT	Point on the anterior curve of the soft tissue chin tangent to the esthetic plane or E line
Center of Cranium	CC	Point of intersection of the basion-nasion plane and the facial axis
Points from Plane at Pterygoid	CF	The point of intersection of the pterygoid root vertical to the Frankfort horizontal plane
PT Point	PT	Junction of Pterygomaxillary fissure and the foramen rotundum.
Condyle	DC	Point in the center of the condyle neck along the Ba–N plane
Nose	En	Point on the soft tissue nose tangent to the esthetic plane
Gnathion	Gn	Point of intersection between the line between pogonion and menton
Gonion	Go	Point of intersection between ramus plane and mandibular plane
Suprapogonion	PM	Point at which shape of symphysis mentalis changes from convex to concave
Pogonion	Pog	Most anterior point of the mandibular symphysis
Cephalometric	PO	Intersection of facial plane and corpus axis
T1 Point	TI	Point of intersection of the occlusal and facial planes
Xi Point	Xi	
Name of Planes	Symbol	
Frankfort Horizontal	FH Plane	This plane extends from porion to orbitale
Facial Plane		This plane extends from nasion to pogonion
Mandibular Plane		Plane extending from gonion to gnathion
PtV (Pterygoid vertical)		This line is drawn through PTM and is perpendicular to the FH plane
Basion-Nasion Plane		Plane extending from basion to nasion
Occlusal Plane		Occlusal plane through molars and premolars contact (functional plane)
A-Pog Line		A line extending from Point A to pogonion
E-Line		This line extends from the tip of soft tissue nose to soft tissue Pogonion

The Rickett analysis also consists of following measurements

Name	Description	Normal	Standard Deviation
Facial Axis	Angle between Pt/Gn and the line N/Ba	90	+/- 3.5
Facial Angle	Angle between the line FL and FH	89	+/- 3
ML/FH	Angle between the line FH and the line ML	24	+/- 4.5
Convexity	Distance between Pog/N and A	0	+/- 2
Li-A-Pog	Distance between Pog/A and Li	1	+/- 2
Ms-PtV	Projection on the line FH of the distance between the markers PT/Ms-d	18	
ILi-/A-Pog	Distance between the line Pog/A and the line Lia/Li	22	+/- 4
Li-EL	Distance between the line EL and Li	−2	+/- 2

=== Sassouni analysis ===
This analysis, developed by Viken Sassouni in 1955, states that in a well proportioned face, the following four planes meet at the point O. The point O is located in the posterior cranial base. This method categorized the vertical and the horizontal relationship and the interaction between the vertical proportions of the face. The planes he created are:

1. Supraorbital plane (anterior clinoid to roof of orbits)
2. Palatal plane (ANS-PNS)
3. Occlusal plane (Downs occlusal plane)
4. Mandibular plane (Go-Me)

The more parallel the planes, the greater the tendency for deep bite and the more non-parallel they are the greater the tendency for open bite. Using the O as the centre, Sassouni created the following arcs

- Anterior Arc – Arc of a circle between the anterior cranial base and the mandibular plane, with O as the center and O-ANS as the radius.
- Posterior Arc – Arc of a circle between anterior cranial base and mandibular base with O as centre and OSp as radius.
- Basal Arc – From A point should pass through B point
- Midfacial Arc – From Te and should pass tangent to the mesial surface of the maxillary first molar

=== Harvold analysis ===
This analysis was developed by Egil Peter Harvold in 1974. This analysis developed standards for the unit length of the maxilla and mandible. The difference between the unit length describes the disharmony between the jaws. It is important to know that location of teeth is not taken into account in this analysis.

The maxillary unit length is measured from posterior border of mandibular condyle (Co) to ANS. The mandibular unit length is measured from posterior border of mandibular condyle (Co) to Pogonion. This analysis also looks at the lower facial height which is from upper ANS to Menton.

=== McNamara analysis ===
Landmark Name	Landmark Symbol	Description	Normal
Maxilla to Cranial Base			
Nasolabial Angle			14 degrees
Na Perpendicular to Point A			0-1mm
Maxilla to Mandible			
AP			
Mandibular Length (Co-Gn)			
Mandible to Cranial Base			
Pog-Na Perpendicular			Small = -8 to −6mm Medium = -4mm to 0mm Large = -2mm to +2mm
Dentition			
1 to A-Po			1-3mm
1 to Point A			4-6mm
Airway			
Upper Pharynx			15-20mm
Lower Pharynx			11-14mm

=== COGS analysis (cephalometrics for orthognathic surgery) ===
This analysis was developed by Charles J. Burstone when it was presented in 1978 in an issue of AJODO. This was followed by Soft Tissue Cephalometric Analysis for Orthognathic Surgery in 1980 by Arnette et al. In this analysis, Burstone et al. used a plane called horizontal plane, which was a constructed of Frankfurt Horizontal Plane.

Landmark Name	Landmark Symbol	Description	Normal
Cranial Base			
Posterior Cranial Base	AR-PTM		
Anterior Cranial BAse	PTM-N		
Vertical Skeletal and Dental			
Upper Anterior Facial Height	N-ANS		
Lower Anterior Facial Height	ANS-GN		
Upper Posterior Facial Height	PNS-N		
Mandibular Plane Angle	MP-HP		
Upper Anterior Dental Height	U1-NF		
Lower Anterior Dental Height	L1-MP		
Upper Posterior Dental Height	UM-NF		
Lower Posterior Dental Height	LM-MP		
Maxilla and Mandible			
Maxillary Length	PNS-ANS		
Mandibular Ramus Length			
Mandibular Body Length			
Chin Depth	B-PG		
Gonial Angle	AR-GO-GN		
Dental Relationships			
Occlusal Plane	OP-HP		
Upper incisors inclination	U1-NF		
Lower incisors inclination	L1/GO-ME		
Wits Analysis	A-B/OP		

- Counterpart Analysis
- Template Analysis

== Computerised cephalometrics ==
Computerised cephalometrics is the process of entering cephalometric data in digital format into a computer for cephalometric analysis. Digitization (of radiographs) is the conversion of landmarks on a radiograph or tracing to numerical values on a two- (or three-) dimensional coordinate system, usually for the purpose of computerized cephalometric analysis. The process allows for automatic measurement of landmark relationships. Depending on the software and hardware available, the incorporation of data can be performed by digitizing points on a tracing, by scanning a tracing or a conventional radiograph, or by originally obtaining computerized radiographic images that are already in digital format, instead of conventional radiographs. Computerized cephalometrics offers the advantages of instant analysis; readily available race-, sex- and age-related norms for comparison; as well as ease of soft tissue change and surgical predictions. Computerized cephalometrics has also helped in eliminating any surgeon inadequacies as well as making the process less time-consuming.

The first medically certified automated cephalometric analysis of 2D lateral cephalometric radiographs by Artificial intelligence was brought to market in November 2019.

== Digitization ==
Computer processing of cephalometric radiographs uses a digitizer. Digitization refers to the process of expressing analog information in a digital form. A digitizer is a computer input device which converts analog information into an electronic equivalent in the computer's memory. In this treatise and its application to computerized cephalometrics, digitization refers to the resolving of headfilm landmarks into two numeric or digital entities – the X and Y coordinate. 3D analysis would have third quantity – Z coordinate.

== Superimposition ==
Cephalometric radiographs can be superimposed on each other to see the amount of growth that has taken place in an individual or to visualize the amount of movement of teeth that has happened in the orthodontic treatment. It is important to superimpose the radiograph on a stable anatomical structures. Traditionally, this process has been done by tracing and superimposing on cranial landmarks. One of the most common used methods of superimposing is called the Structural Method.

=== Structural method ===
According to American Board of Orthodontics, this method is based on series of study performed by Arne Bjork, Birte Melsen and Donald Enlow. This method divides superimposition in three categories: Cranial base superimposition, maxillary superimposition and mandibular superimposition. Some of the important landmarks in each category is listed below as per the structural method.

==== Cranial base superimposition ====
- The inner contour of the anterior wall of sella turcica
- Walker point
- The anterior contour of the middle cranial fossa
- The contour of the cribriform plate
- Details in the trabecular system in the anterior cranial fossa.
- The contours of the bilateral fronto-ethmoidal crests.
- The cerebral surfaces of the orbital roofs

==== Mandibular superimposition ====
- The anterior contour of the chin
- The inner cortical structure at the inferior border of the mandibular symphysis.
- Trabecular structures in the mandibular symphysis.
- Trabecular structures related to the mandibular canal.
- The lower contour of a molar germ

==== Maxillary superimposition ====
- The anterior contour of the zygomatic process

== See also ==
- Orthodontic technology
