= FC4 =

FC4 may refer to:

- Far Cry 4, a 2014 video game
- CFC4, Macmillan Pass Airport, Transport Canada's airport code
- Release 4 of the Fedora Core Linux distribution
- Fiber Channel protocol mapping layer
- FC4: an EEG electrode site according to the 10-20 system
