= PO4 =

PO4 may refer to:

- Phosphate
- PO4: an EEG electrode site according to the 10-20 system
