= Dental Council =

Dental Council may refer to:

- Dental Council of India, a 1948 establishment
- General Dental Council, a United Kingdom organisation which regulates all dental professionals in the country
- Orthodontic Technicians Association Council, the governing body of the Orthodontic Technicians Association
- Pakistan Medical and Dental Council, a Pakistan federal department
