= Robert William Reid =

Scottish anatomist

Robert William Reid (1851–1939) was a Scottish anatomist whose 1884 paper "Observations on the relation of the principal fissures and convolutions of the cerebrum to the outer surface of the scalp" introduced what would become known as Reid's base line.

== Life ==
Reid was born on 14 May 1851 at the Manse of St Mary's Kirk, Auchindoir, Aberdeenshire, to the Reverend William Reid and Elizabeth Mary Scott. He was educated at the village school at Lumsden, then Aberdeen Grammar School, and King's College, Aberdeen. His medical studies were at Marischal College, where he became anatomical assistant to Professor Sir John Struthers. In 1873 he became demonstrator of anatomy at St Thomas' Hospital, London, and in 1881 a Fellow of the Royal College of Surgeons. He was one of the founders of the Anatomical Society (est. 1887), serving as its president 1910–1912.

When Professor Struthers retired in 1889, Reid succeeded him as Regius Professor of Anatomy at the University of Aberdeen. He introduced the teaching of embryology with the use of x-rays, as well as developing research on remains from prehistoric tombs in Scotland, and establishing the Marischal Museum. He retired as professor in 1925, and as curator of the museum in 1938. He died in Aberdeen on 28 July 1939.
