= Suprameatal triangle =

Area in the temporal bone of the skull

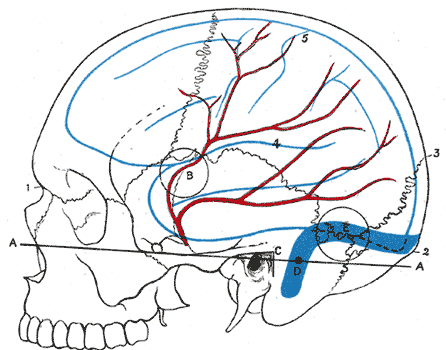
- Relations of the brain and middle meningeal artery to the surface of the skull. 1. Nasion. 2. Inion. 3. Lambda. 4. Lateral cerebral fissure. 5. Central sulcus. AA. Reid's base line. B. Point for trephining the anterior branch of the middle meningeal artery. C. Suprameatal triangle. D. Sigmoid bend of the transverse sinus. E. Point for trephining over the straight portion of the transverse sinus, exposing dura mater of both cerebrum and cerebellum. Outline of cerebral hemisphere indicated in blue; course of middle meningeal artery in red.

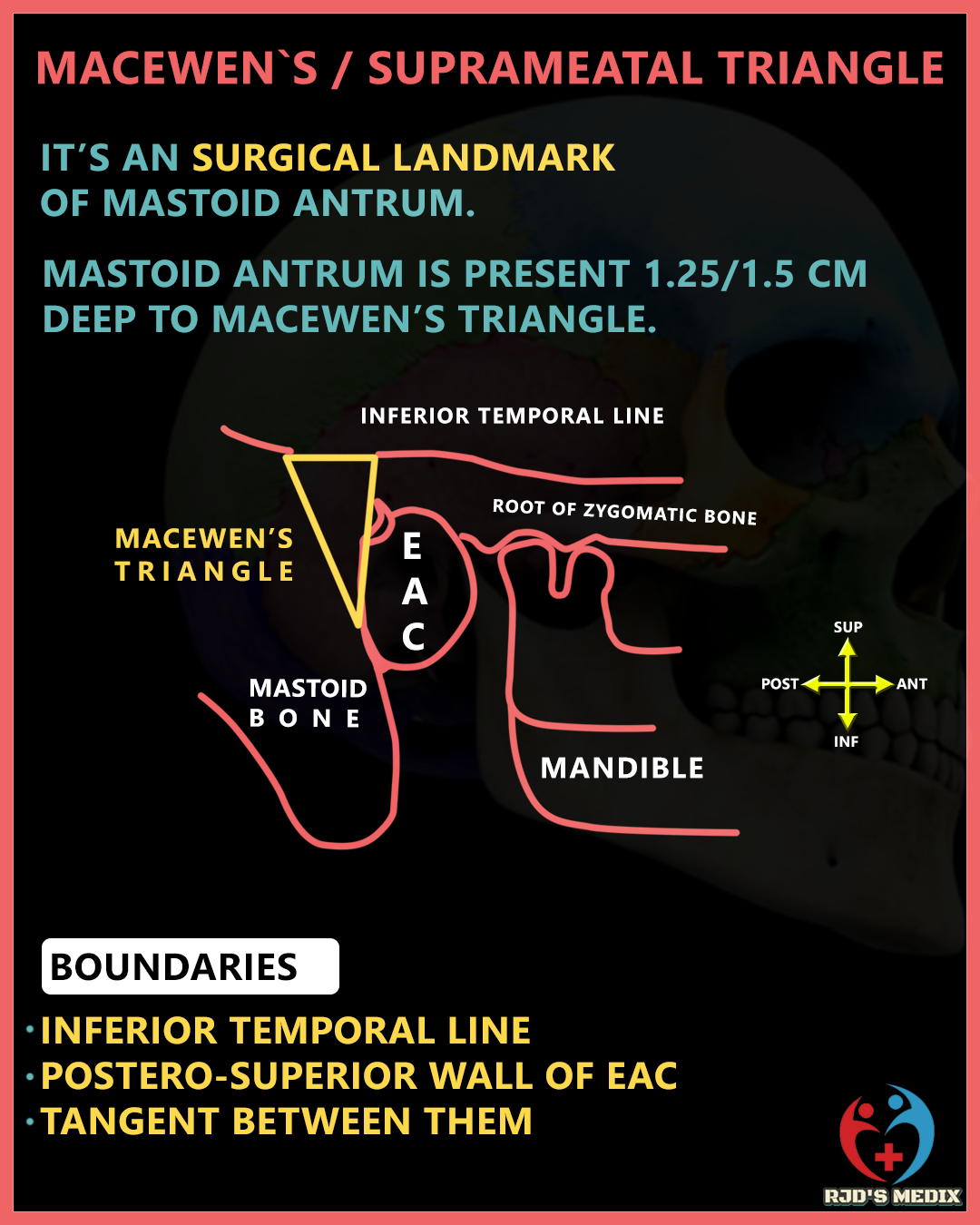
- Macewan's suprameatal triangle

Details

Identifiers
- Latin: foveola suprameatica
- TA98: A02.1.06.069
- TA2: 710
- FMA: 54960

In the temporal bone, between the posterior wall of the external acoustic meatus and the posterior root of the zygomatic process is the area called the suprameatal triangle, suprameatal pit, mastoid fossa, foveola suprameatica, or Macewen's triangle, through which an instrument may be pushed into the mastoid antrum.
In the adult, the antrum lies approximately 1.5 to 2 cm deep to the suprameatal triangle. This is an important landmark when performing a cortical mastoidectomy. The triangle lies deep to the cymba conchae.
