= Standard anatomical position =

Standardized ways to display animals for anatomical study

The standard anatomical position, or standard anatomical model, is the scientifically agreed upon reference position for anatomical location terms. Standard anatomical positions are used to standardise the position of appendages of animals with respect to the main body of the organism. In medical disciplines, all references to a location on or in the body are made based upon the standard anatomical position.

A straight position is assumed when describing a proximo-distal axis (towards or away from a point of attachment). This helps avoid confusion in terminology when referring to the same organism in different postures. For example, if the elbow is flexed, the hand remains distal to the shoulder even if it approaches the shoulder.

== Human anatomy ==
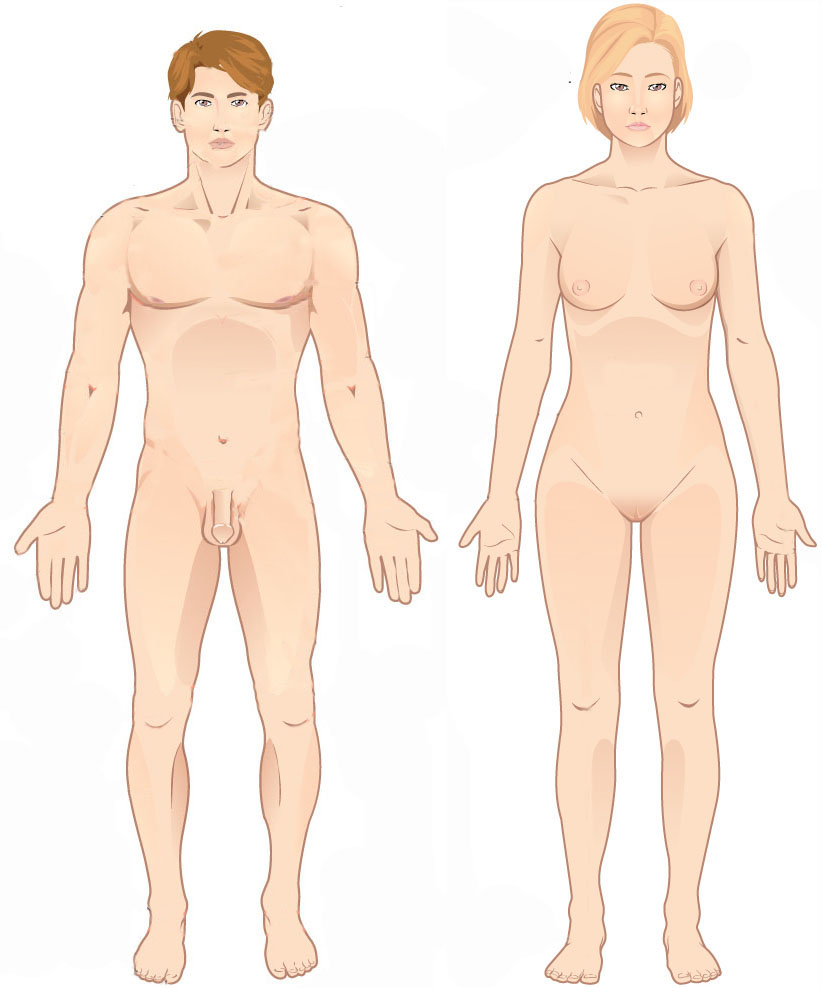
The standard anatomical position in a male and female

In standard anatomical position, the human body is standing erect and at rest. Unlike the situation in other vertebrates, the limbs are placed in positions reminiscent of the supine position imposed on cadavers during autopsy. Therefore, the body has its feet together (or slightly separated), and its arms are rotated outward so that the palms are forward, and the thumbs are pointed away from the body (forearms supine). As well, the arms are usually moved slightly out from the body, so that the hands do not touch the sides. The positions of the limbs (and the arms in particular) have important implications for directional terms in those appendages. The penis in the anatomical position is described in its erect position and therefore lies against the abdomen, hence the dorsal surface of the penis is actually anterior when the penis is flaccid.

=== Skull ===
In humans, the anatomical position of the skull has been agreed by international convention to be the Frankfurt plane (also known as the Frankfort plane), a position in which the lower margins of the orbits, the orbitales, and the upper margins of the ear canals, the porions, all lie in the same horizontal plane. This is a good approximation to the position in which the skull would be if the subject were standing upright and facing forward normally.

== History ==
=== Frankfurt plane ===
The Frankfurt plane was established at the World Congress on Anthropology in Frankfurt am Main, Germany in 1884, and decreed as the anatomical position of the human skull. It was decided that a plane passing through the inferior margin of the left orbit (the point called the left orbitale) and the superior margin of each ear canal or external auditory meatus, a point called the porion, was most nearly parallel to the surface of the earth at the position in which the head is normally carried in the living subject. The alternate spelling Frankfort plane is also widely used, and found in several medical dictionaries, although Frankfurt is the modern standard spelling of the city it is named for. Another name for the plane is the auriculo-orbital plane.

Note that in the normal subject, both orbitales and both porions lie in a single plane. However, due to pathology, this is not always the case. The formal definition specifies only the three points listed above, sufficient to describe a plane in three-dimensional space.

For purposes of comparison of human skulls with those of some other species, notably hominids and primates, the skulls may be studied in the Frankfurt plane; nonetheless, the Frankfurt plane is not horizontal in the anatomical position for most non-primate species.

The Frankfurt plane may also be used as a reference point in related fields. For example, in prosthodontics, the Frankfurt-Mandibular plane Angle (FMA) is the angle formed at the intersection of the Frankfurt plane with the mandibular plane.

== Other animals ==
A partial illustration of the human standard anatomical position next to that of a quadruped. Both viewed from the side.

In quadrupeds the standard anatomical position is the animal standing upright with all four feet on the ground and the head facing forward. For a fish this is belly down with neutral appendages.

== See also ==
- Reid's base line
- Anatomical terms of location
