= Adams family (disambiguation) =

The Adams political family was a leading family in the politics and intellectual life of the United States in the 18th and 19th centuries.

Adams family may also refer to:

- The Adams family of removable dental appliance retention components that consists of the Adams clasp and associated components
- The Adams family, London-based criminal family that established the Clerkenwell crime syndicate
- The Adams family abuse controversy, political controversy in Northern Ireland surrounding allegations of child abuse in the family of Sinn Féin leader Gerry Adams
- The Adams family, a filmmaking and musical family who produced, directed and starred in Hellbender and other films

== See also ==
- Adams (surname)
- The Addams Family, group of fictional characters created by American cartoonist Charles Addams
  - The Addams Family (disambiguation)
