= FC3 =

FC3 may refer to:

- Far Cry 3, a 2012 video game.
- Release 3 of the Fedora Core Linux distribution.
- 1982 FC3, an alternative name for the asteroid 4172 Rochefort
- FC3: an EEG electrode site according to the 10-20 system
