= 10-20 system =

10-20 system may refer to:

- 10-20 system (swimming safety), a technique used by lifeguards
- 10-20 system (EEG), an electrode placement method used in electroencephalography systems
