= TP9 =

TP9 may refer to:

- Brügger & Thomet MP9
- Canik TP9
- TP9: an EEG electrode site according to the 10-20 system
