= Reid's base line =

Radiographic orientation of human skull

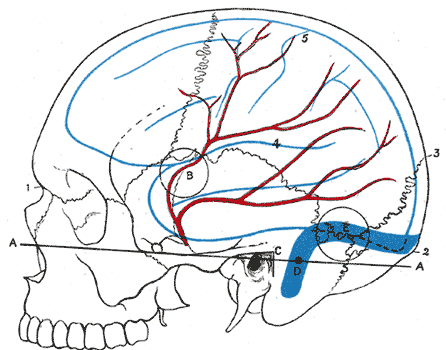
- Relations of the brain and middle meningeal artery to the surface of the skull. 1. Nasion. 2. Inion. 3. Lambda. 4. Lateral cerebral fissure. 5. Central sulcus. AA. Reid's base line. B. Point for trephining the anterior branch of the middle meningeal artery. C. Suprameatal triangle. D. Sigmoid bend of the transverse sinus. E. Point for trephining over the straight portion of the transverse sinus, exposing dura mater of both cerebrum and cerebellum. Outline of cerebral hemisphere indicated in blue; course of middle meningeal artery in red.

Reid's base line is used for an unambiguous definition of the orientation of the human skull in conventional radiography, computer tomography (CT), and magnetic resonance imaging (MRI) studies. It is defined as a line drawn from the inferior margin of the orbit (Orbitale point) to the auricular point (center of the orifice of the external acoustic meatus, Auriculare point) and extending backward to the center of the occipital bone. Reid's base line is used as the zero plane in computed tomography. Paediatric base line is an anatomic line that maintains a fixed relation to facial bones throughout the period of growth.

In 1962, the World Federation of Radiology defined it as the line between the infraorbital margin and the upper margin of the external auditory meatus. It originally derived from Robert William Reid's 1884 paper "Observations on the relation of the principal fissures and convolutions of the cerebrum to the outer surface of the scalp".

With the head upright, it is typically tilted about 7 degrees nose up with respect to the horizontal plane.

== See also ==
- Frankfurt plane
