= GK =

GK or Gk may refer to:

== Businesses and organizations ==
- Gallien-Krueger, an instrument amplifier company
- Gawad Kalinga, an anti-poverty movement based in the Philippines
- Society for Orthodontic Dental Technology (German: Gesellschaft für Kieferorthopädische Zahntechnik), a professional body based in Germany
- Jetstar Japan's IATA designator

== People ==
- G. K. Chesterton, a Roman Catholic novelist and author
- GK Barry, English influencer and presenter
- GK (art director) (Gopi Kanth), Indian art director

== Places ==
- Gadobangkong railway station, a railway station in West Bandung Regency, Indonesia
- Geilenkirchen, a city in North Rhine-Westphalia, Germany, by vehicle registration code until 1971
- Graham-Kapowsin High School, in Pierce County, Washington
- Greater Kailash, New Delhi, India
- Guernsey (FIPS PUB 10-4 territory code)

== Sports ==
- Goalkeeper, a designated player protecting the goal in team sports
  - Goalkeeper (association football)
  - Goalkeeper (handball)
  - Goal keeper (netball)
  - Goalkeeper (water polo)
- Vegas Golden Knights of the National Hockey League

== Other uses ==
- Glucokinase, an enzyme that facilitates phosphorylation of glucose to glucose-6-phosphate
- Gōdō gaisha, a type of Japanese business organization
- GK, the gene encoding Glycerol kinase, a phosphotransferase enzyme
- Guntur Kaaram, a 2024 Indian Telugu-language action drama film by Trivikram Srinivas
- General knowledge, various information accumulated over time without specialized study
