= Natural head position =

Natural head position is a reproducible position of a head when it is in an upright position, with eyes looking straight at a mark. The concept was introduced into the field of orthodontics in the late 1950s by Moorrees and Kean. A horizontal line related to the natural head position has been recommended as the most reliable plane to study cephalometric analysis.

== History ==
Anthropologists and craniologists when studying skulls faced a dilemma which was related to the head position of the skulls relative to the head position of the living human beings. In order to take care of this problem a horizontal axis line outside the skull was used to approximate a natural head position of the skull. However, a linkage between an outside horizontal plane and a horizontal plane on the skull still had to be done. Thus, after several meetings, in 1882 at a craniometric conference in Frankfort, Germany a plane known as the Frankfort horizontal plane was proposed through left and right porion and left orbitale as a horizontal plane that can be used to study skulls. In the meeting of 1884, this plane was finally accepted.

=== Drawbacks of other planes ===
Planes such as the Frankfort horizontal plane or sella-nasion plane have their own drawbacks. The anatomical points that these planes are based on are not known to be stable over time, which may lead to variability and error in studying the cephalometric analysis of a patient. For example, the nasion-sella line which part of our anterior skull is used as a reference line for lateral cephalometric radiographs. The nasion point is known to be move anteriorly and inferiorly over time and thus can lead to an error in the values that are used to study the maxillo-mandibular relationship to the cranial base in lateral cephalometrics.

Frankfurt Horizontal plane itself has been known to show an error of anywhere between +9 and -7 degrees. This plane is compromised by two points: Porion and Orbitale. Identifying the porion by itself is shown high variability, especially due to the point machine porion sometimes overlapping the anatomical porion.

== Registration ==
Registration of natural head position was defined by Solow and Tallgren in 1970s. They used the term 'orthoposition' in which a person is asked to stand in front of a mirror and look into their own eyes after a set of neck exercises. Other ways of registering natural head position have been described by Lundstrom who used an operator-based natural head position. Other methods such as use of inclinometer, fluid device or looking at a small light have also been described.

== Reproducibility ==
Ideally, a cephalometric plane should have good reliability, good individual reproducibility, and be as close to true horizontal plane and true vertical plane as possible. Many studies over time have discussed the reproducibility of the natural head position in patients. Cooenrad and Morees in 1958, performed a study where they looked at two groups of 20-year-old female students at the Forsyth School for Dental Hygienists were radiographed in their natural head position. They showed in their short-term study that the reproducibility error was 2.05 degrees. In a long-term study done by Cooke et al., they showed 1.9 degree error at 5-year mark and 2.23 degree of error at 15 year mark.

== See also ==
- Cephalometric analysis
- Cephalometry
