= PO3 =

PO3 may refer to:

- Phosphite
- Petty officer third class
- PO3: an EEG electrode site according to the 10-20 system
- A videogame character from Inscryption
