= Society for Orthodontic Dental Technology =

German professional body for orthodontics

Gesellschaft für Kieferorthopädische Zahntechnik e.V
- Formation: 1990
- Type: Professional association
- Headquarters: Halle/Saale
- Location: Germany
- Official language: German
- Chairman: Berit Junghanns
- Key people: Heike Pietack (Secretary); Gerhard Maier (Treasurer)
- Affiliations: (Italy) ORTEC (Sweden) Sveriges Ortondonti Tandtekniker Förening (United Kingdom) Orthodontic Technicians Association
- Website: www.gk-online.org

The Society for Orthodontic Dental Technology (German: Gesellschaft für Kieferorthopädische Zahntechnik e.V (GK)) is a professional body that represents orthodontic technicians and is based in Germany. Established in 1990, the society was founded by Friedbert Schmeil, who served as the society's first chairman until 1997.

== Current activities ==
The aims of the association are to promote high quality of orthodontic dental technology, to stimulate and support interdisciplinary engagement, to hold an annual congress and build relationships with international professional organisations.

== Membership ==
Although based in Germany with a predominantly German membership, GK has an international membership base – the society has members from Austria, France, Italy, Luxembourg, Norway, Poland, Spain, Sweden, Switzerland and the United Kingdom. Membership benefits include contact with colleagues and other professional organisations both national and internationally, a regularly updated membership register (German: mitgliederliste), new innovations at national and international level, opportunities for active participation in the society, an online encyclopaedia of orthodontic technology as well as regular updates about the society. As of 2014, membership is €60 per annum.

== Board of directors ==
The society is run by a board of directors, currently chaired by Berit Junghanns. Heike Pietack is secretary and Gerhard Maier is treasurer. Petra Brambora, Jörg Stehr and Ines Forest are the other board members.

== Annual congress ==
The GK holds an annual congress (German: Harzer Fortbildungsseminar), and invites nationally and internationally renowned speakers to lecture at the event. The conference also offers members a platform to share their experiences and advice to colleagues. Home speakers have included Rolf Hinz, Aurelia Lerch and Ursula Wirtz. International speakers have included James Green, Paul Mallett and Guido Pedroli.

== Partner organizations ==
GK has a close working relationship with overseas organizations such as GTO and ORTEC (Italy), Sveriges Ortondonti Tandtekniker Förening (Sweden) and the Orthodontic Technicians Association (United Kingdom).
