= Addams Family Values (disambiguation) =

Addams Family Values may refer to:

- Addams Family Values, the 1993 motion picture
- Addams Family Values: The Original Orchestral Score, featuring Marc Shaiman and Artie Kane
- Addams Family Values: Music from the Motion Picture, an urban music soundtrack
- Addams Family Values (video game)

== See also ==
- The Addams Family (disambiguation)
