= International Orthodontic Congress =

International Orthodontic Congress is a meeting held every five years where world's leading Orthodontists and allied professionals come together to discuss Orthodontic related topics. The first meeting was held in 1926 in New York City, US, and has had 8 meetings happen in its 90-year history. This is an official meeting of World Federation of Orthodontists (WFO).

== History ==
1st International Orthodontic Congress was held in 1926 in New York City, US. It was the first worldwide congress ever held by a dental speciality at that time. Dr. William Fisher was the first President of the International Orthodontic Congress (IOC). He was also the President of American Society of Orthodontists (ASO). The ASO was celebrating its 25th anniversary of its founding in 1901. At that time, the International Congress consisted of fifteen orthodontic societies.

2nd International Orthodontic Congress was held in 1931 in London, England. Dr. J.H. Badcock was the President of 2nd International Congress, in addition to helming the Presidency of European Orthodontic Society (EOS) and British Society for Study of Orthodontics (BSSO).

3rd International Orthodontic Congress was to be held in 1938 in Montreal, Canada. Due to the tensions of WWII and death of Dr. Fisher, the 3rd international congress did not take place in Montreal. For next three decades, due to Korean and Vietnam War, the organization of the Congress was further delayed. Eventually the 3rd IOC was held in 1973 in London. Dr. William J. Tulley was the President of 3rd IOC. Dr. B.F. Dewel then served as vice-president of IOC.

4th International Orthodontic Congress was held in 1995 in San Francisco, US. Dr. William H. DeKock organized the 4th IOC. During this meeting, World Federation of Orthodontists (WFO) was created. The WFO acted as an accrediting body for orthodontic specialists throughout the world. After Dr. DeKock contacted many different Orthodontic societies around the world by sending them the bylawas of WFO. Ultimately 68 national and regional orthodontic societies signed the charter of World Federation of Orthodontics in San Francisco on May 15, 1995.

5th International Orthodontic Congress was held in Chicago, US, in 2000 along with the 100th session of the American Association of Orthodontists. 6th International Orthodontic Congress was held in Paris, France, in 2005 along with Societe Francaise d’Orthopedie Dento-Faciale and Syndicate des Specialistes Francais en Orthopedie Dento-Faciale.

7th International Orthodontic Congress was held in Sydney, Australia, in 2010 and was sponsored by Australian Society of Orthodontists. 8th International Orthodontic Congress was held in London, England in 2015 and was hosted by the British Orthodontic Society. This year 20-year anniversary of WFO was also celebrated. 9th International Orthodontic Congress will be held in Yokohama, Japan, in 2020.
