= The Addams Family (disambiguation) =

The Addams Family are fictional characters who originated in a series of comics created in 1938 by Charles Addams in The New Yorker magazine.

The Addams Family may also refer to:

== Television ==
- The Addams Family (1964 TV series), sitcom starring Carolyn Jones and John Astin
- The Addams Family (1973 TV series), animated
- Halloween with the New Addams Family, 1977 TV film
- The Addams Family (1992 TV series), animated
- The New Addams Family, 1998 remake of the sitcom, starring Ellie Harvie and Glenn Taranto
- Wednesday (TV series), 2022 Netflix series starring Jenna Ortega

== Films ==
- The Addams Family (1991 film), comedy starring Anjelica Huston and Raúl Juliá
- Addams Family Values, 1993 sequel, also starring Anjelica Huston and Raúl Juliá
- Addams Family Reunion, non-sequel, direct-to-video, 1998 film comedy, starring Tim Curry and Daryl Hannah
- The Addams Family (2019 film), animated, starring Oscar Isaac and Charlize Theron
- The Addams Family 2, 2021 sequel to the 2019 film

== Games ==
- The Addams Family (pinball), 1992 pinball machine based on the 1991 film
- The Addams Family (video game), 1992 platform game based on the 1991 film

== Stage shows ==
- The Addams Family (musical), 2010 musical comedy

== See also ==
- Addams Family Values (disambiguation)
- Charles Addams (1912–1988), cartoonist
- Adams political family
- Adams family (disambiguation)
