= Egil Peter Harvold =

American orthodontist

Egil Peter Harvold (1912 – November 17, 1992) was an American orthodontist who is known for developing a cephalometric analysis known as Harvold Analysis. He also is known to have contributed significantly towards the understanding of the orofacial clefts and craniofacial development.

== Life ==
Harvold received his degrees in medicine and dentistry in Germany and Norway respectively. He practiced as an orthodontist in 1937 in Norway. After few years of practicing orthodontics, he received his Ph.D. in anatomy from Oslo, Norway. Because of his interested in cleft lip and palate and other craniofacial anomalies, he became interested in becoming a research fellow at a dental institute in Oslo. He eventually came to University of Michigan for teaching for a couple of years. After then, he went to University of Toronto in 1959, where he became a professor and head of the orthodontic department until 1961.

In 1963, he headed off to University of California, San Francisco, where he became the director of Center of Craniofacial Anomalies until his retirement in 1980. Harvold's research focused on interrelationship between genetic and environmental factors in development of the head and face.

He died in Oslo, Norway, in 1992 at the age of 80.

== Awards and positions ==
- The Royal College of Dentists of Canada Award
- University of Toronto & University of Wales, honorary degrees
- International Society of Craniofacial Biology, president
- Department of Medicine and Surgery, Veteran's Administration, member
