= St Mary's Kirk, Auchindoir =

Church in Scotland

St Mary's Kirk
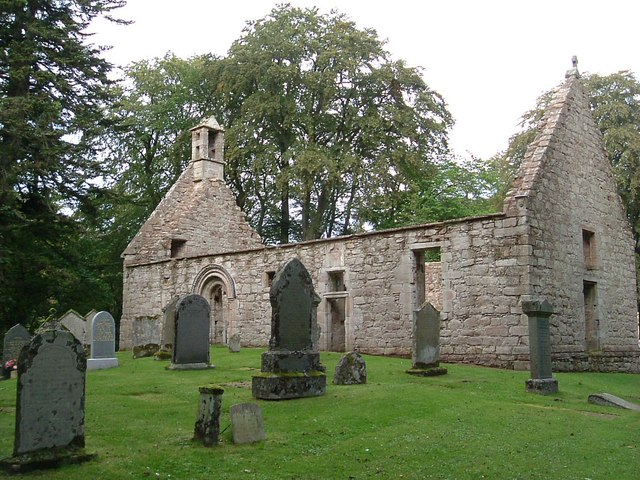
- St Mary's Kirk, Auchindoir, Aberdeenshire
- St Mary's Kirk
- 57°18′31″N 2°52′07″W

Scheduled monument
- Official name: Auchindoir, St Mary's Church, Mote Hill and Dovecot
- Type: Ecclesiastical: church, Secular: doocote, dovecote, pigeon loft; motte
- Designated: 7 February 1936
- Reference no.: SM90267

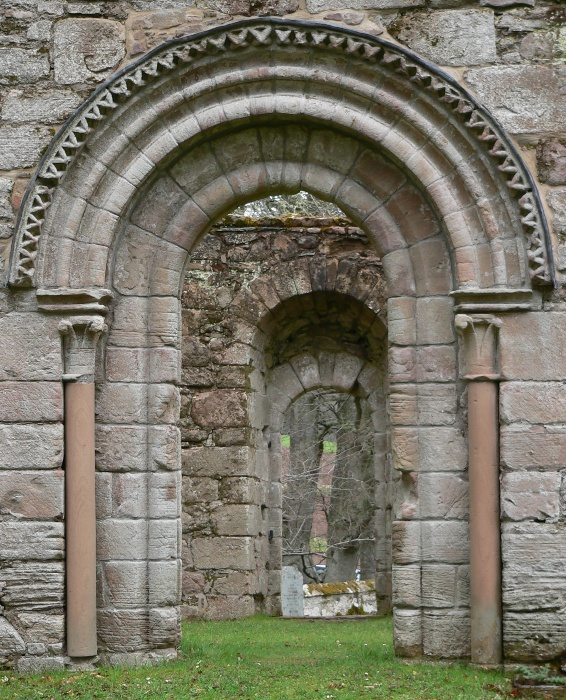
The south doorway of St Mary's Kirk, Auchindoir

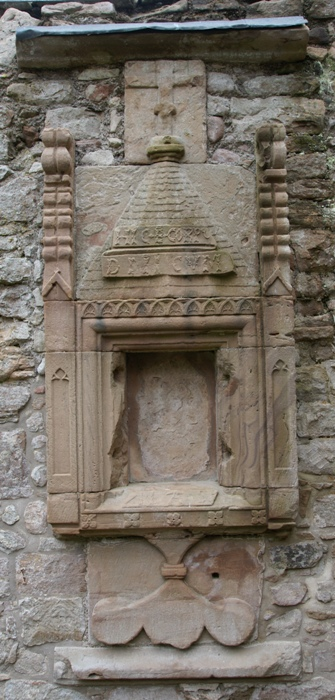
The 16th-century sacrament house at St Mary's Kirk

St Mary's Kirk at Auchindoir, between Rhynie and Lumsden, in Aberdeenshire, Scotland, is one of the country's finest surviving medieval parish kirks. The main doorway is early Romanesque, and there is a well-preserved early 16th-century sacrament house, similar to those at Deskford and Kinkell.

The early 13th-century kirk has been roofless since the early 19th century, but the walls and gables are nevertheless in good condition. In the care of Historic Scotland, it is registered as a Scheduled Ancient Monument.

== Unusual survivor ==
St Mary's is rare for a Scottish church in that it has survived into the modern era without any major alterations. Although surviving medieval churches are reasonably common throughout the country, almost all were significantly altered during and after the Reformation, often so heavily transformed that it is difficult to see their medieval origins. Of the few other churches which have survived the Reformation largely intact, e.g. Rosslyn Chapel in Midlothian, nearly all are of a later date than Auchindoir.

Another factor making Auchindoir unusual is that most surviving Romanesque structures in Scotland are either large monastic houses or cathedrals, or else chapels and churches associated with larger monastic or ecclesiastical complexes. As a modest parish church St Mary's is an unusual survivor.

== History ==
St Mary's Kirk was built in the early 13th century and served as the place of worship for the nearby motte and bailey castle, next to a gorge to the south-east of the church. First mentioned in 1236, the church was dedicated to the Virgin Mary. West of the church was a source called St Mary's Well, which was supposed to relieve toothache. In 1514 the church was elevated to a prebend of King's College in Aberdeen, thereby receiving the income of a canon. It was subsequently used as a parish church, surviving the Reformation largely intact. However, in the 17th century it was redecorated, with most of the lancet windows replaced with larger windows.

In 1810, the church ceased to be used as a place of worship and the old timber work was sold publicly. The following year, a new village church—the North Parish Church, also called Newton of Auchindoir—came into use, and St Mary's was abandoned.

== Architectural features ==
The church has been described as one of Northern Scotland's finest specimens of 13th-century First-Pointed architecture. It is said to belong to the period when "the already softened features of the Norman were beginning to merge altogether into the still more flexile and varied forms of the First-Pointed style." One peculiarity is that the church stands north and south rather than east and west. It had already lost its roof at the beginning of the 19th century but the walls of rubble and freestone quoins remain intact. The nave leads directly into the chancel without any structural division. Alterations were made in the first half of the 16th century and during the 17th century when doors and windows were added. The belfry on the west gable dates from 1664.

One of the most impressive feature of St Mary's is its Norman-arched doorway with well-preserved chevron decorations. Standing next to the outer wall in the north-east corner of the church, a grave slab dated 1580 and dedicated to "O.L.H.M." and "A.S.", together with the arms on the adjacent plaque, is associated with the Gordons of Craig from Craig Castle.

Inside the church, at the east end of the north wall, there is a highly decorated sacrament house in the Second-Pointed style of the early 1500s, set in what used to be a lancet window. It is surmounted by a representation of Christ on the cross. There is an inscription on the sacrament house that reads: "HIC•E•CORP D N I C V M" (HIC Est CORPus Domini Nostri Iesu Christi Virginis Mariae meaning "Here is the Body of Our Lord Jesus Christ of the Virgin Mary").

Two shields are set in the east wall near the sacrament house—one dated 1557 with the Gordon arms and motto "Hoip in God" while another, initialed V.G : C.C., bears the arms of Gordon and Cheyne with the motto "Grace me Gyid". They correspond to the time when William Gordon and Clare Cheyne were laird and lady of the castle.

== Sources ==
- Jervise, A: "Notes respecting the Castle of Craig and the Old Kirk of Auchindoir, &c., in Aberdeenshire", Proceedings of the Society of Antiquaries of Scotland, vol.8, 1871. Pages: 327–330.
- Simpson, William Douglas: "Craig Castle and the Kirk of Auchindoir, Aberdeenshire", Proceedings of the Society of Antiquaries of Scotland, vol.64, 1930. Page(s): 59 figs. 6, 9.
