= World Federation of Orthodontists =

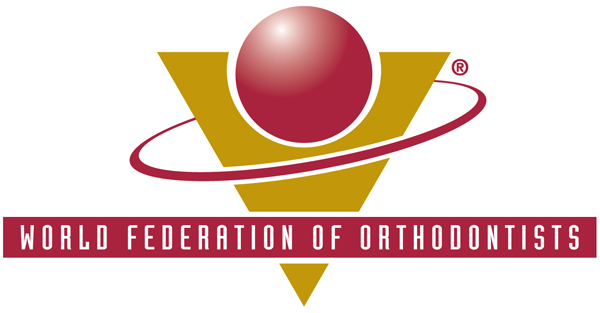
- Abbreviation: WFO
- Founded: May 15, 1995; 31 years ago
- Founded at: San Francisco
- Purpose: Advance the art and science of orthodontics
- Location: St. Louis, United States
- Region served: Worldwide
- Members: 8,000 WFO fellows and 109 affiliated organizations (2022)
- President: Dr. Nikhilesh R. Vaid
- Vice President: Dr. Panagiotis Skoularikis
- Secretary General: Dr. Lee Graber
- Website: www.wfo.org

The World Federation of Orthodontists (WFO) is a worldwide federation of a medical associations for orthodontists that was formed at the 4th International Orthodontic Congress (IOC) in San Francisco by 69 affiliated organizations on May 15, 1995, and now has over 8,000 WFO fellows and 109 affiliated organizations. It is based in St. Louis, Missouri, USA

== History ==
The concept that was developed for the WFO was based on the fact that the national and regional orthodontic societies throughout the world would know who their orthodontic specialist members were and would be willing to validate that credential in order for the individual to become a Fellow of the World Federation of Orthodontists. Sixty-eight national and regional orthodontic societies from sixty-two countries joined with the AAO to sign the charter of the WFO at the Herbst Theatre in San Francisco on May 15, 1995. The Herbst Theatre had been the site, fifty years earlier when the United Nations charter was signed in 1945 following World War II.

The organisation celebrates 15 May as the World Orthodontic Health Day, where importance of Orthodontic treatment by a qualified specialist orthodontist is emphasised around the world.

By 2025, the executive of the WFO consisted of Dr Nikhilesh R. Vaid President, Dr. Panagiotis Skoularikis Vice President, Dr. Lee Graber Secretary General, Dr. Khaled Samir AboulAzm (Africa and the Middle East), Dr. Bryce Lee (South East Asia and Oceania), Dr. Eric JW Liou (Central and East Asia), Dr. Ricardo Machado Cruz (Central and South America), Dr. DeWayne McCamish (North America), Dr. Takashi Ono (Central and East Asia), Dr. Valmy Pangrazio-Kulbersh (North America), Dr. Letizia Perillo (Europe), Dr. Yanheng Zhou (Central and East Asia) and Dr. Flavia Artese (South America and Chair of the 10th IOC). Dr. Vinod Krishnan is the Editor of the JWFO.

The WFO publishes a Journal of the World Federation of Orthodontists and organises an International Congress every five years (IOC). The 10th IOC will he held in Rio de Janeiro, Brazil in 2025.

Initially, the WFO Executive Committee focused the WFO and its resources towards the importance of recognizing the orthodontic specialist in every corner of the globe as an important provider of orthodontic care. Several WFO affiliate organizations recognize different levels of the providers of orthodontic care, but in order for an orthodontic organization to be affiliated with the WFO its bylaws must provide a specific membership category for the “orthodontic specialist” or “orthodontist.” Only an orthodontic specialist is eligible to become a WFO Fellow (member). This ensures that all WFO fellows are recognized in their country as having had additional training so as to be entitled to use the term “orthodontist” or “orthodontic specialist.” Each WFO affiliate president certifies this specialty status when he or she signs the membership application of his or her organization’s member to become a WFO Fellow.

A WFO Fellow receives the WFO Gazette twice yearly mailed to an office or home as a benefit of membership in the WFO in addition to receiving discounted registration fees to the IOC and several annual meetings of WFO affiliates. A WFO Fellow may also display the WFO certificate of membership and the WFO pin. The WFO website, www.wfo.org provides a directory of its membership so that anyone searching for an orthodontist can be assured that an orthodontist listed in the directory has the necessary training and experience to provide high-quality orthodontic care.

== Purpose ==
The purpose of the WFO is to advance the art and science of orthodontics throughout the world. As stated in the WFO Bylaws, the WFO purpose will be accomplished by fulfilling the following objectives:

1. Encourage high standards in orthodontics throughout the world;
2. Encourage and assist in the formation of national associations and societies of orthodontists when requested;
3. Encourage and assist in the formation of national and regional certifying boards in the field of orthodontics when requested;
4. Promote orthodontic research;
5. Disseminate scientific information;
6. Promote desirable standards of training and certification for orthodontists;
7. Organize the International Orthodontic Congress to be held at least once every five years.

== See also ==
- American Board of Orthodontics
- British Orthodontic Society
- Canadian Association of Orthodontists
