= Arne Björk =

Swedish dentist

Erik Arne Björk (22 December 1911 – 5 February 1996) was a Swedish dentist famous for his The Face in Profile Analysis which he published in 1947. He is also known to develop the implant radiography.

== Education ==
Björk was born in Ludvika, Sweden. He received his dental training in Stockholm. He practiced dentistry from 1937 to 1951. He served as chairman of orthodontics in Malmö, Sweden from 1940 to 1950. He then served as Professor of Orthodontics in Royal Dental College, Denmark. During his studying, he published his thesis called "Face in the Profile" which made him famous in the orthodontic circles. Eventually, he became the head of Department of Orthodontics and head of Craniofacial Growth Center at the Royal Dental College for next 30 years. He was nominated as member of World Federation of Orthodontists in 1995.

== Implant Radiography ==
Björk was one of the first people to work on Implant Radiography. He, along with his coworkers, placed metal pins in bones of jaws and other parts of the skeleton. They then looked at these pins in a Cephalometric Analysis to assess the growth pattern of a growing individual. This technique was instrumental in providing a way to study the grown pattern of a human mandible. Previously to his work, the information about how rotation of jaws playing a role in growth of maxilla and mandible was under-appreciated. Björk, through his research, defined concepts of Forward Rotation and Backward Rotation of jaws. He defined Forward Rotation of jaw where the posterior growth of maxilla and mandible is greater than the anterior and Backward Rotation as where the anterior growth of jaws is greater than the posterior areas.

Björk also developed seven structural signs that helped find the direction of the growth of the mandible, also known as Bjork Analysis.

1. Inclination of Condylar Head
2. Curvature of Mandibular Canal
3. Shape of Lower border of Mandible
4. Inclination of Symphysis
5. Interincisal Angle
6. Intermolar or Interpremolar Angles
7. Lower Anterior Facial Height

== Awards and recognitions ==
- Honorary member of World Federations of Orthodontists
- Albert Ketcham Memorial Award - 1973
- Chairman of Orthodontic Department at Malmö, Sweden 1949-1950
- Orthodontic Professor at Royal Dental College, 1951-1981
- Sheldon Friel Memorial Lecture - 1980
