= George Northcroft =

George Northcroft (1868 - 1943) was a British orthodontist who is known for his contributions in the formation of the British Orthodontic Society. The society was initially formed in 1907 as British Society for the Study of Orthodontics (BSSO) and the name later changed to British Orthodontic Society. He also played an important role in formation of the Dental Act of 1921 which made dentistry a profession in Great Britain.

== Life ==
He attended Woodhouse Grove School and The Leys School in Cambridge, England. He then received a scholarship to study dentistry at University of Michigan School of Dentistry where he obtained his degree in 1890. He then attended the London School of Dental Surgery to attain a dental degree in England. He then practiced for 8 years in Windsor, England. He joined the British Dental Association in 1893 and in 1932 he became the President of the association. He helped found and later became the president of the British Society for the Study of Orthodontics, serving from 1909 to 1939.

He became a member of many organizations such as the Odontological Section of the Royal Society of Medicine, of the American Dental Society of Europe, and of the European Orthodontic Society. He became president of European Orthodontic Society in 1927. He was also a co-founder of the London Hospital Dental School.

== Orthodontics ==
In 1907, Dr. Northcroft and some of his friends got together and discussed topics related to Orthodontics. This group of men came together to form British Society for the Study of Orthodontics (BSSO). Dr. Northcroft was interested in studying the growth and development of the skull and jaws related to children. Therefore, he took dental impressions and facial plaster models of his son William during the age of 6 years to 21 years. Dr. Northcroft thus produced the first study of 3D facial growth.

During yearly conference of British Orthodontic Society, Northcroft Memorial Lecture is delivered by an outstanding orthodontist.

== Awards ==
- Order of the British Empire for his service during WW1
