= Porion =

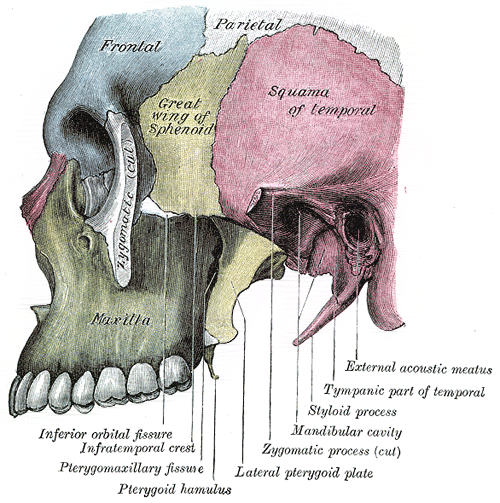
- Side view of head, showing surface relations of bones. (Porion is visible at the superior margin of the external acoustic meatus.)

Identifiers
- TA2: 423
- FMA: 264711

The porion is the point on the human skull located at the upper margin of each ear canal (external auditory meatus, external acoustic meatus). It lies on the superior margin of the tragus. It is a cephalometric landmark with significance in biological anthropology and in clinical applications such as oral and maxillofacial surgery.

== Anatomical significance ==
The porion is one of the three anatomical points used to determine the Frankfurt plane. The Frankfurt plane (also called the auriculo-orbital plane) was established at the World Congress on Anthropology in Frankfurt, Germany in 1884, and decreed as the anatomical position of the human skull for comparative craniometric measurements. It was decided that a plane passing through the inferior margin of the left orbit (the point called the left orbitale) and the upper margin of each ear canal or external auditory meatus, a point called the porion, was most nearly parallel to the surface of the earth at the position the head is normally carried in the living subject.

In normal subjects, both orbitales and both porions lie in a single plane. However, due to pathology, this is not always the case. The formal definition specifies only the three points listed above, sufficient to describe a plane in three-dimensional space.

The Mastoid Index (a craniometric measurement) is the distance from the porion to the asterion.

The determination of the Frankfort plane differs between skeletal and soft tissues, soft tissue using the tragus as the landmark in place of the porion.

== Additional images ==
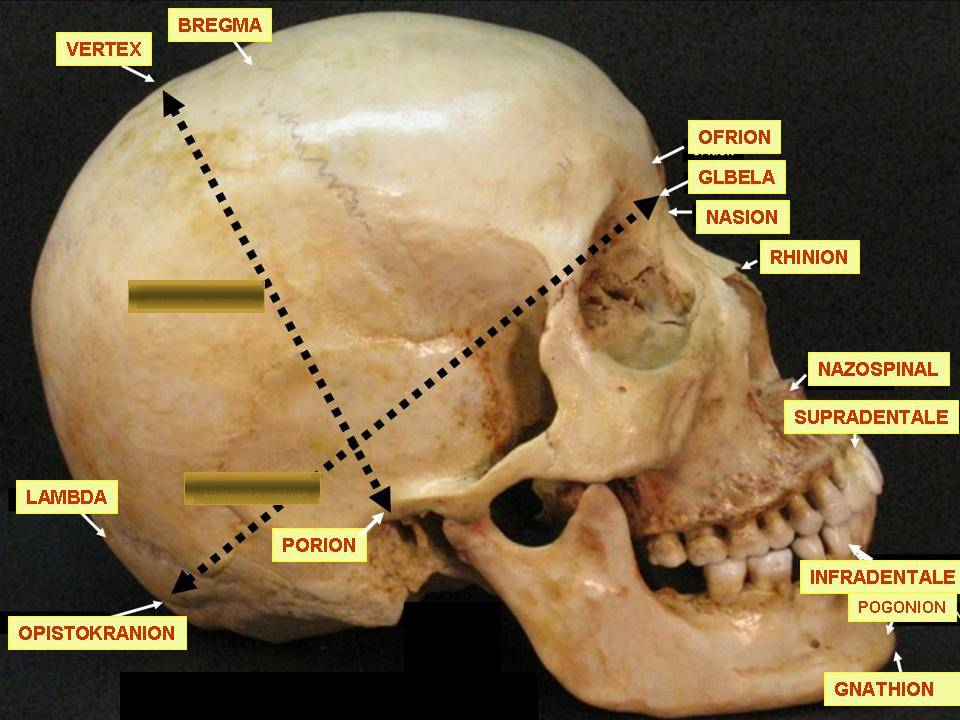
The porion. Human skull.
