= Frontonasal suture =

Suture in the human skull

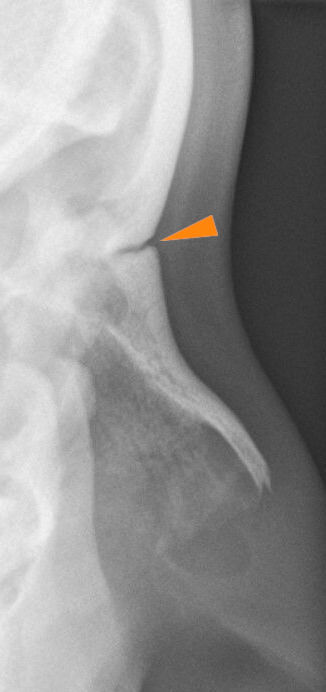
Frontonasal suture

The frontonasal suture (Latin: Sutura frontonasalis) is a cranial suture that is found in the human skull, connecting the frontal bone and the two nasal bones. This suture meets the internasal suture at the nasion. It is crucial in the study of cranial development and forensic analysis.

In forensic anthropology, the frontonasal suture can be used as a landmark for skull reconstruction and to help determine the age and ancestry of unidentified remains.

In craniofacial surgery, understanding the anatomy of the frontonasal suture is crucial for procedures that involve the nasal bridge and forehead.
