= Dacryon =

Bone junction in the skull

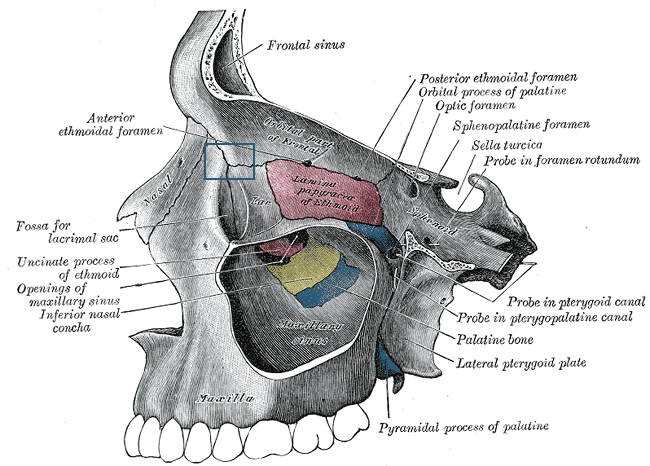
- Medial wall of left orbit. (Dacryon visible but not labeled.)

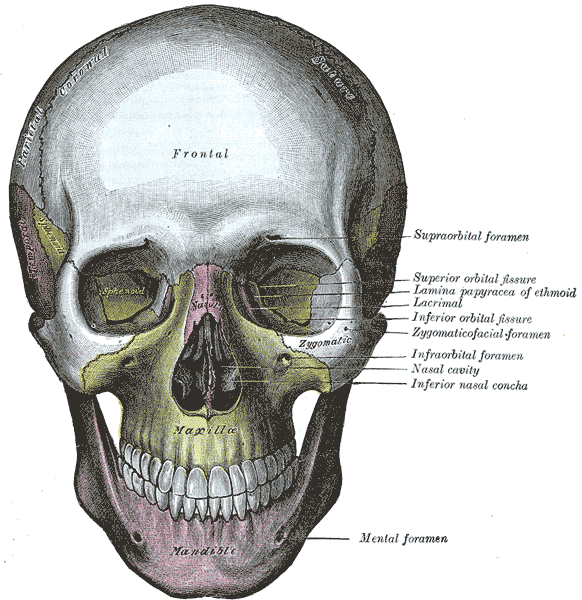
- The skull from the front. (Dacryon visible but not labeled. Maxilla is yellow bone in center, frontal bone is light blue bone at top, and lacrimal bone is barely visible pink bone at center. Label for lacrimal bone is at center right.)

The point of junction of the maxillary bone, lacrimal bone, and frontal bone is named the dacryon.
