= Regius Professor of Anatomy (Aberdeen) =

The Regius Professor of Anatomy is a Regius Professorship at the University of Aberdeen in Scotland. Seven people have been appointed to this position:

Name	Tenure
John Struthers	1863–1889
Robert William Reid	1889–1925
Alexander Low	1925–1938
Robert D. Lockhart	1938–1964
David Sinclair	1964–1977
E. John Clegg	1977–1991
Unfilled	1991–2018
Simon H. Parson	2018–present
