= The Dental Manufacturing Company Limited =

- Industry: Manufacturing
- Products: Dental equipment

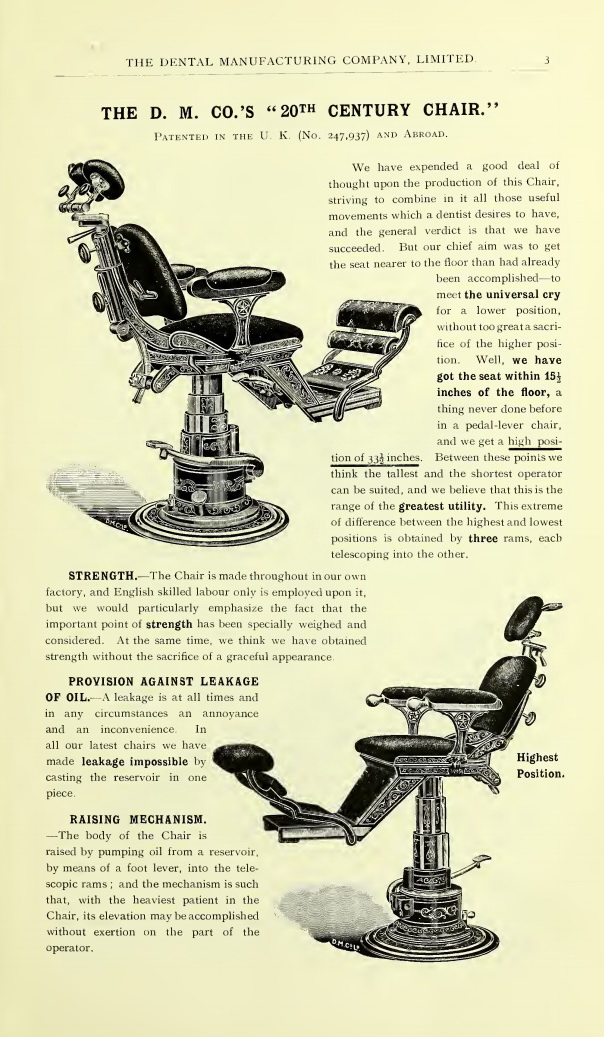
Page from "The Dental Manufacturing Company Limited" catalogue of 1912

The Dental Manufacturing Company Limited manufactured dental equipments, motor silencers, and agricultural equipment in London, England in the late nineteenth century. The company existed from 1874 to 1968.

== Company history ==
In the 1890s, L Gardner & Sons made dentists' chairs for the company. Over a period of three years, 106 were produced some lifted hydraulically, and others by a rack and pinion system. In 1914, the company was located at Alston House, Newman Street, London, and produced artificial teeth, dental rubbers, dental chairs, vulcanizers' instruments, and dentists' requisites. It also had offices in Manchester, Glasgow, and Dublin.
