= Lumsden, Aberdeenshire =

Coordinates: 57.286°N 2.874°W

Lumsden
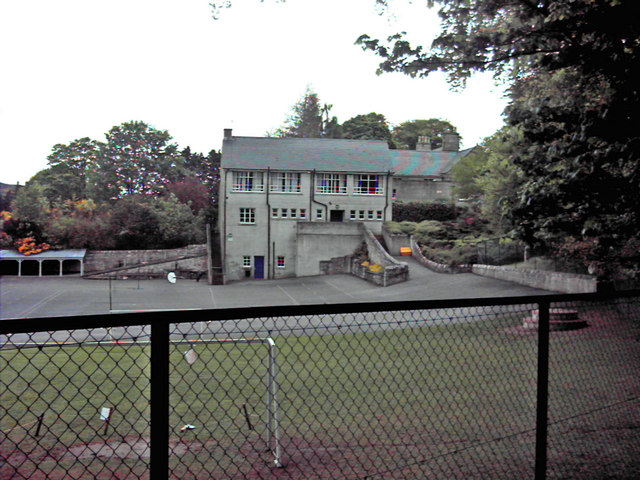
- Lumsden School

- Location within Aberdeenshire
- Population: 344 (2009)
- OS grid reference: NJ472217
- Council area: Aberdeenshire
- Lieutenancy area: Aberdeenshire
- Country: Scotland
- Sovereign state: United Kingdom
- Post town: HUNTLY
- Postcode district: AB54
- Police: Scotland
- Fire: Scottish
- Ambulance: Scottish
- UK Parliament: Gordon and Buchan
- Scottish Parliament: Aberdeenshire West

Lumsden is an inland village in Aberdeenshire, Scotland on the A97 road.

== Location ==
It crowns a rising-ground 227 m (745 ft) above sea level amid a fertile district. It is situated around 7.3 miles (11.7 km) northwest of Alford and is near both the River Don and the upper course of the Water of Bogie.

== History ==
The village was founded around 1825 by Harry Leith Lumsden of Auchindoir on what was then a barren moor.

The Scottish Sculpture Workshop has been based in the village since 1979.

== Population ==
The population was 243 in 1840, 478 in 1861, 487 in 1871 and 519 in 1881. The population in 2009 is 344, a decline to levels before 1861.

== Transport ==
Bus services to the village have been cut back. The village now has a limited service to Alford, Strathdon, and Huntly.

== Notable people ==
- William Robertson Nicoll, writer and Free Church minister, born in Lumsden.
- Robert William Reid, anatomist, educated at Lumsden school.
- Cameron Gordon, mathematician, born in Lumsden.
