= Journal of Orthodontics =

- Discipline: Orthodontics
- Language: English
- Edited by: Martyn T Cobourne

Publication details
- Former name: British Journal of Orthodontics
- History: 1974–present
- Publisher: Taylor & Francis on behalf of the British Orthodontic Society (United Kingdom)
- Frequency: Quarterly

Standard abbreviations
- ISO 4: J. Orthod.

Indexing
- ISSN: 1465-3125 (print); 1465-3133 (web)
- British Journal of Orthodontics
- ISSN: 0301-228X

Links
- Journal homepage; Online access; Journal of Orthodontics online archive

The Journal of Orthodontics is a quarterly peer-reviewed medical journal published by Maney Publishing on behalf of the British Orthodontic Society, of which it is the official journal. It was established in 1974 as British Journal of Orthodontics, before obtaining its current title in 2000.

== Abstracting and indexing ==
The journal is abstracted and indexed in MEDLINE/PubMed and CINAHL.

== See also ==
- List of medical journals
