= Adams clasp =

- MeSH: D016734

An Adams clasp is a component used to retain a custom-made medical device in the mouth. The clasp functions by engaging the mesiobuccal and distobuccal undercuts of a tooth, typically the maxillary first molar and is used to retain a wide range of devices prescribed in a variety of medical and dental specialties.

== Synonyms ==
The Adams clasp is so named because it was invented by English orthodontist C. Philip Adams. It was originally referred to as the modified arrowhead clasp and has been called the Liverpool clasp because it was developed at the Liverpool Dental School where Adams lectured. The terms Adams crib and universal clasp have also been used.

== Material ==
The component is formed from a length of hard stainless steel wire with Adams universal pliers. The wire for a permanent tooth is typically 0.7mm in diameter but 0.8mm can also be used, especially for clasps that are made to fit two teeth. A clasp for a deciduous tooth can be made from 0.6mm or 0.7mm wire and 0.6mm wire has been advocated for a canine.
