= British Orthodontic Society =

Medical association

- Abbreviation: BOS
- Predecessor: The Orthodontic Societies
- Formation: use 1 July 1994; 32 years ago
- Type: Medical association
- Purpose: Represents all orthodontists and dentists carrying out orthodontics across the UK
- Headquarters: 12 Bridewell Place EC4, London
- Location: United Kingdom
- Main organ: Journal of Orthodontics
- Website: Official website

The British Orthodontic Society (BOS) is a medical association for orthodontists in England. It publishes the Journal of Orthodontics. The British Orthodontic society represents all orthodontists and dentists practicing orthodontics across the UK.

== History ==
=== The Orthodontic Societies ===
The British Orthodontic Society (BOS) was founded on 1 July 1994. It represented the unification of the five existing UK orthodontic societies:

==== British Society for the Study of Orthodontics (BSSO) ====
Founded in 1907, this was the first national orthodontic society. It had its origins in London, where on 21 October 1907, George Northcroft invited 15 colleagues to discuss establishing a society to promote orthodontics. The inaugural meeting of the BSSO took place on 5 December 1907, when JH Badcock was elected as the Society's first President. Originally conceived as a study group, it became a well respected scientific organisation. For most of its existence, it published the "Transactions of the BSSO" annually which contained all papers presented to the society in the preceding year. Following the establishment of the National Health Service in 1948 and the increasing demand for orthodontic treatment, there was a perceived need for representation nationally. The BSSO eschewed political involvement. This led to the creation of the BAO, COG, COS and AUTO, which represented orthodontists working in specialist practice, hospital orthodontics, community orthodontic clinics and the universities.

==== Consultant Orthodontists Group (COG) ====
The COG was formed in 1964 to represent the interests of orthodontic consultants working in the hospital service and membership was restricted to those holding an NHS consultant contract. The group held their own clinical and political meetings twice a year. The COG fostered and maintained strong links with the Royal Surgical Colleges and their Specialty Advisory Committee (SAC)as well as the British Dental Association (BDA). Some years later, the Senior Registrars in Orthodontics Group (SROG) was formed to represent those undergoing higher training to become hospital consultants.

==== British Association of Orthodontists (BAO) ====
Representing orthodontists in specialist practice, the BAO was established in 1965 following a meeting at the Unicorn Hotel in Stow-on-the-Wold. The unicorn logo was subsequently adopted by the BAO. The founding members were Jack Alexander, Hans Eirew and Bill Frankland who went on to become, respectively, the first Chairman, Treasurer and Secretary of the BAO. The Association sought recognition for specialists in orthodontic practice through specialist registration.For this reason, full membership was, in 1971, restricted to practitioners holding a postgraduate qualification. The Association produced its own publication, "The Orthodontist" for a number of years, as well as holding an annual conference. BAO meetings concentrated on practical and clinical issues as well as practice management, with an element of political discussion.

==== Community Orthodontists Section (COS) ====
This group was formed in 1978 under the aegis of the BAO, which provided financial support. It was established to look after the interests of orthodontists working in the Community Dental Service. The BAO continued to support the COS financially even after it became an autonomous organisation.

==== Association of University Teachers of Orthodontics (AUTO) ====
AUTO was formed to represent those orthodontists employed by the universities and who devoted much of their time to teaching and research.

=== Unification ===
The creation of the BOS as a unified Society took over 15 years. The process was initiated due to a realization that many members belonged to more than one group and also that the BSSO, BAO and COG were, to some extent, duplicating their activities. At a joint meeting of the BAO and BSSO in Oxford in 1975, one BAO member, Roger Thomas, proposed that the societies combine. A further impetus to unification took place in 1978 with the creation of the British Orthodontic standards Working Party. This organization was set up jointly between the BSSO, BAO and COG under the chairmanship of Professor Barry Leighton. This joint Working Party had the objective of making recommendations regarding standards in Orthodontics. Subsequently, representatives from COS and AUTO joined. The Working Party has produced numerous authoritative reports on many aspects of orthodontic standards and has done much to improve the quality of national orthodontic care. In 1980, Mr R Bird, President of the BSSO produced a discussion paper: "Organisation of the Orthodontic Societies into a single Society". In 1983, a joint meeting of the officers of BSSO, BAO, COG and AUTO proposed the holding of a joint conference. The first meeting of the Conference Committee took place in December of that year and elected David DiBiase as the first Chairman. The first British Orthodontic Conference took place in Bournemouth in 1986. The success of this conference further strengthened the move towards unification. In September 1990, a Unification Working Party was set up, initially between the BSSO and BAO. The constitution was finally agreed at the BOC, held in Glasgow in 1993.

Following this, the BOS became a unified society on 1 July 1994.

== Location ==
The BOS was originally based at the Eastman Dental Institute in Grays Inn Road, London. In 2006 the Society moved to 12 Bridewell Place EC4, in the City of London and in 2024 moved to its current location - 38-43 Lincoln’s Inn Fields, London. WC2A 3PE

== Executive body ==
The main executive body is the Board of Trustees. This comprises the President, Honorary Secretary and Honorary Treasurer as well as the Directors of the six directorates; namely, Clinical Governance, Clinical Practice, Education, Communications, Professional Development and Research.
