= Nasion =

Intersection of the frontal bone and two nasal bones of the human skull

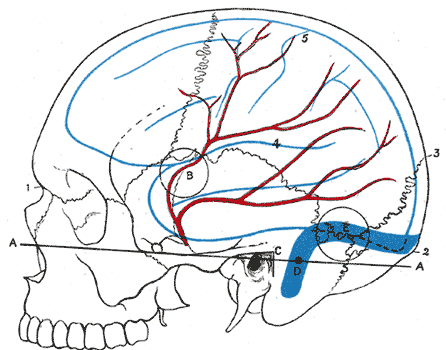
- Relations of the brain and middle meningeal artery to the surface of the skull. (Nasion is at #1.)

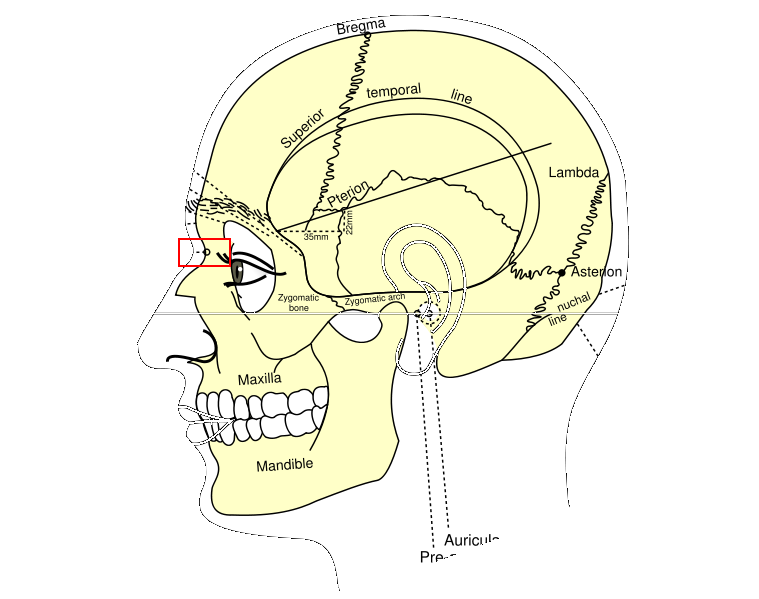
- Side view of head, showing surface relations of bones. (Nasion labeled at center left.)

Details

Identifiers
- Latin: nasion
- TA98: A02.1.00.015
- TA2: 417
- FMA: 264779

The nasion (UK: /ˈneɪziən/ NAY-zee-ən, US: /ˈneɪziɒn/ NAY-zee-on) is the most anterior point of the frontonasal suture that joins the nasal part of the frontal bone and the nasal bones. It marks the midpoint at the intersection of the frontonasal suture with the internasal suture joining the nasal bones. It is visible on the face as a distinctly depressed area directly between the eyes, just superior to the bridge of the nose. It is a cephalometric landmark that is just below the glabella.
