= Exposition Park =

Exposition Park may refer to:

== Peru ==
- Park of the Exposition, an urban park in Lima

== United States ==
=== California ===
- Exposition Park (urban park), a public museum and sport complex the Los Angeles neighborhood of the same name
- Exposition Park, Los Angeles, a neighborhood

=== Texas ===
- Exposition Park, Dallas, a neighborhood

=== Pennsylvania ===
- Exposition Park (Pittsburgh), a former baseball stadium
- Exposition Park, the former name for Conneaut Lake Park in Conneaut Lake

=== Missouri ===
- Exposition Park (Kansas City), a former baseball stadium

=== New York ===
- Exposition Park, the former name of Starlight Park in New York City

== See also ==
- Expo Park
