= Henry Cameron =

Henry Cameron may refer to:

- Henry Alvin Cameron (1872–1918), African-American schoolteacher and u.S. Army officer
- Henry Fairfax, 4th Lord Fairfax of Cameron (1707–1793), Scottish nobleman, peer, and politician
- Henry Cameron (footballer) (born 1997), New Zealand international football player

== See also ==
- Harry Cameron (disambiguation)
