= Deep Ellum, Dallas =

Neighborhood in Dallas, Texas, US

Deep Ellum
- Neighborhood
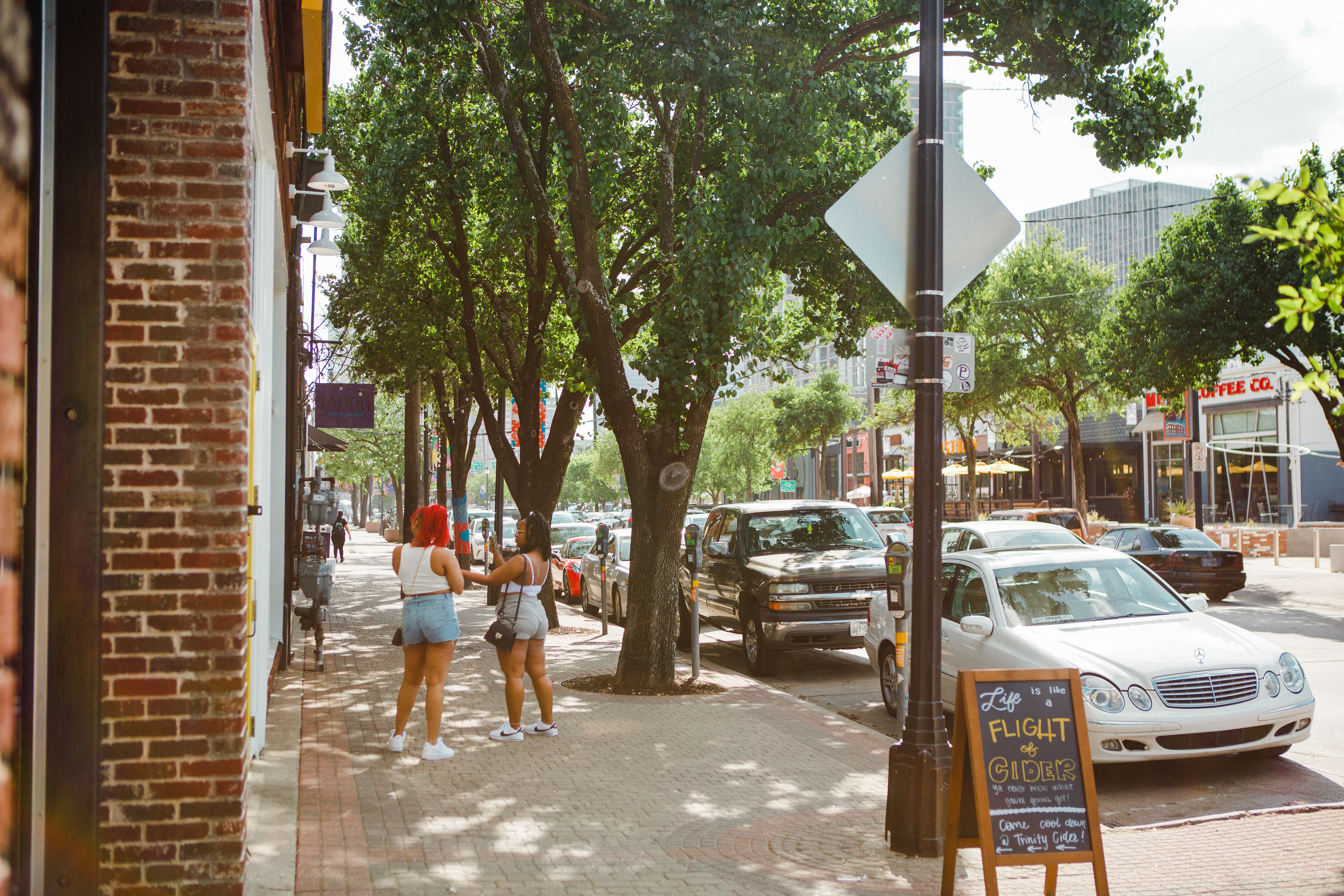
- Main Street in Deep Ellum

- Location within DFW Location within Texas Location within the United States
- Coordinates: 32°47′04″N 96°46′50″W
- Country: United States of America
- State: Texas
- County: Dallas County
- City: Dallas
- Time zone: UTC-6:00 (CST)
  - Summer (DST): UTC-5:00 (CDT)

Deep Ellum is a historic neighborhood of Dallas, Texas, home to a diverse array of arts venues, restaurants, bars, entertainment venues, businesses, and urban residential units near downtown in East Dallas. Its name is based on a corruption of the area's principal thoroughfare, Elm Street. Older alternative uses include Deep Elm and Deep Elem.

The neighborhood lies directly east of the elevated I-45/US 75 (unsigned I-345) freeway and extends to Exposition Avenue, connected to downtown by, from north to south, Pacific, Elm, Main, Commerce, and Canton streets. The neighborhood is north of Exposition Park and south of Bryan Place.

== History ==
=== Early days ===
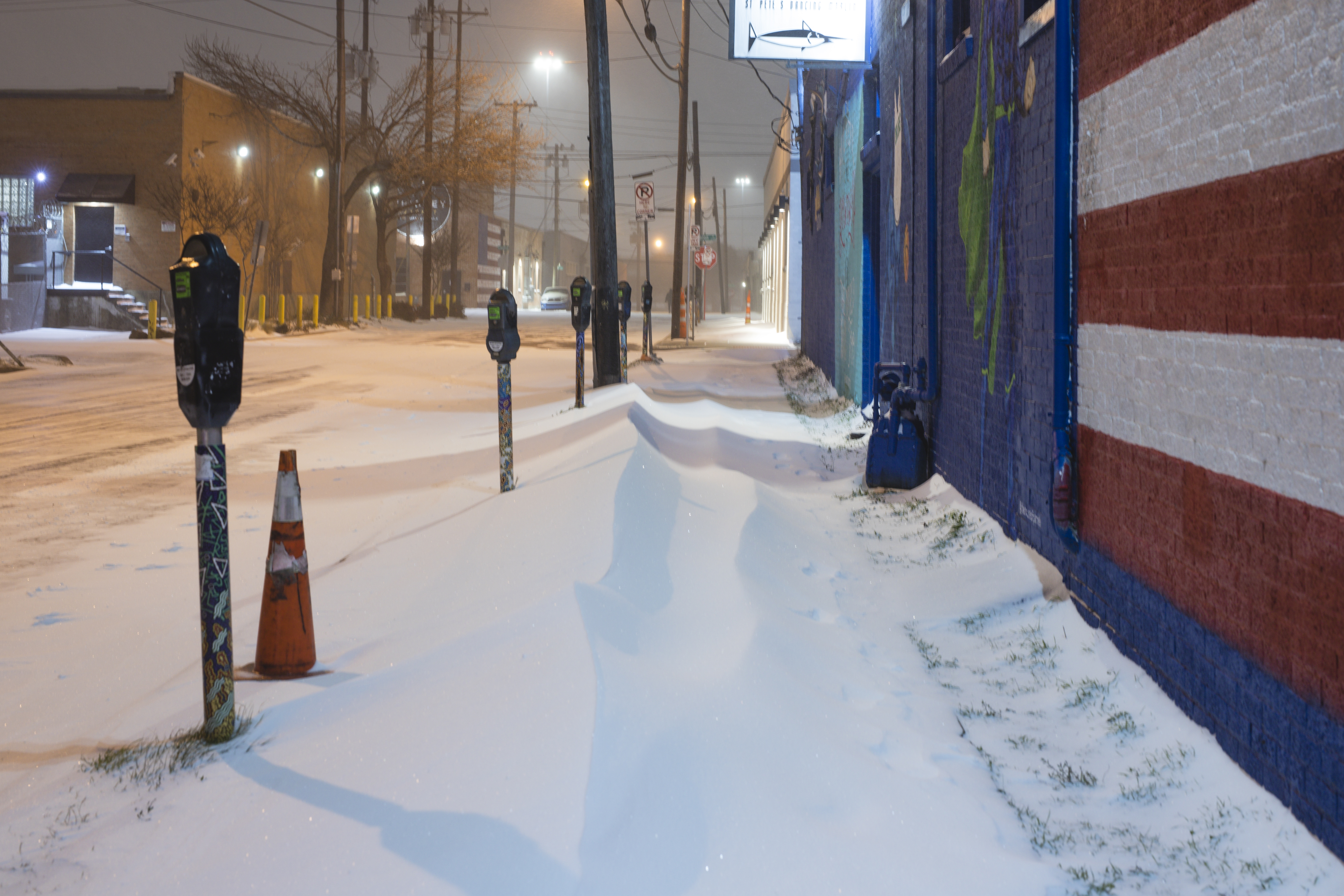
Deep Ellum sidewalk covered with snow during the mid-February 2021 winter storm

After earning independence as a free nation from Mexico in 1836, Texas remained autonomous for nearly a decade, when the United States officially annexed the nation in December 1845. After slavery was abolished nationwide, many freed slaves from Texas and nearby states arrived in Dallas and together congregated as a freedman's town along the northeastern edge of town. The eventual arrival of a railroad junction in the early 1870s spurred a local economy around the shipping line industry, which led to more families settling in the future Deep Ellum, consisting of a stretch of Elm Street near the railroad junction just outside of town, and about one mile from Freedman's Town. Together, the two areas would become one of the largest African-American communities in the South. The neighborhood traces its beginnings to the meeting point of the Houston and Texas Central railroad track, and the later Texas and Pacific line, and by 1873, the two lines were connected. The railroad junction's historical pre-eminence can still be seen in the surrounding neighborhood, sometimes also called Central Track, the name of which is derived from the rail line. These areas and the connecting downtown segment of Elm St. across the dividing, dry Trinity River bed, together, likely retain the most distinct history in Dallas.

=== Economic development ===
When the first train came into Dallas in 1872, 500 African-Americans were already living there. Throughout the 1870s, the new railroad provided various positions and opportunities for residents nearby, which thrived as the African-American cultural and residential center since the 1870s. Even some theaters and entertainment areas were constructed for neighborhoods in the 1890s.

==== Fading of Deep Ellum ====
During the period of the Great Depression in the 1930s, African Americans received assistance from the National Association for the Advancement of Colored People, which positively influenced the area. Although African-American neighborhoods pulled together during these hard times, some negative reports derailed their efforts by exposing African Americans' terrible living conditions. These reports possibly led to higher crime rates and increased prostitution. In 1940, the government started to revise the law to update the city appearance following the national city beautification movement. At the same time, some changes in zoning and rebuilding the "slum" started from 1943 to 1945.

==== Highway's influence towards Deep Ellum ====
In 1912, the concept of "highways" first entered the American consciousness. Based on support from the government of Dallas, new highways were designed at a rapid rate. In the early 1940s, the railway was torn out with strong reproach from the residents, causing problems for them. However, the highways' negative influence on those neighborhoods was not reported, and it was a significant reason for the low quality of living for black people. This successfully boosted business in Deep Ellum, but did not last too long. A new highway known as the Central Expressway was started in 1947 and completed by 1949. It departed from Elm town to downtown Dallas and decreased the African-American population. After two decades of debating between the city bureau and residents, most blocks from Deep Elm were removed by the requirement of the city's plan. In 1968, the freeway construction commenced, and most residents were asked to move to other places. As Prior. M (2005) said, "historical communities in Deep Ellum were leveled to the ground because excessive speculation during the period of rising interest rates had caused the 'bubble' of the real estate boom to explode of the 1970s and the 'bust' of the 1980s."

==== Revitalization ====
By the mid-1980s, artists, musicians, and entrepreneurs moved into the previously abandoned shops and warehouses and began to revitalize the area, dubbed "Dallas's Soho" by D Magazine. Deep Ellum, with its colorful history and unique culture, completed significant revitalization by 2020. An influx of more affluent residents and major corporations in Deep Ellum reshaped the area's demographics and culture, though some aspects of the neighborhood's historic identity have been preserved

=== Industrial development ===
Robert S. Munger built his first cotton-gin factory, the Continental Gin Company, in a series of brick warehouses along Elm Street and Trunk Avenue in Deep Ellum in 1888. As the business grew to become the largest manufacturer of cotton-processing equipment in the United States, Munger expanded the factory by adding additional structures along Trunk and Elm in 1912 and 1914. A Dallas Landmark District, the industrial complex was converted to loft apartments in 1997.

As Neiman Marcus and Titche-Goettinger were catering to wealthy Dallasites a mile away in downtown, Henry Ford selected Deep Ellum in 1914 as the site for one of his earliest automobile plants. Designed by architect John Graham, who planned many regional facilities for Ford during the early 1900s, the building was constructed as an assembly plant for the famous Ford Model T. The plant remained in this location at 2700 Canton Street until the mid-1930s; Adam Hats moved into the four-story brick and terracotta structure in 1959. The Dallas Landmark was converted to loft apartments in 1997, adding yet another layer of history to the building.

The Knights of Pythias Temple, also known as the Union Bankers Trust Building, is located at 2551 Elm Street. Opened in 1916, the building was designed by African-American architect William Sidney Pittman, the state's first black architect and the son-in-law of Booker T. Washington. In addition to serving as the state headquarters for the Knights, the temple housed some of the city's earliest offices for black doctors, dentists, and lawyers and served as the social and cultural center for the African-American community until the late 1930s. The building was Pittman's largest built work. The building has now been turned into a hotel, becoming the first hotel in modern time to newly operate in Deep Ellum. Historically, there was the Boyd Hotel, located on Elm St. in an unsegregated stretch outside of downtown. As Conrad Hilton was building in downtown the "whites only" Dallas Hilton, (the first of his burgeoning empire), and the luxurious Adolphus Hotel was hosting Big Band luminaries such as Benny Goodman, Glenn Miller and Tommy and Jimmy Dorsey, the Boyd Hotel in Deep Ellum attracted numerous black musicians, such as Leadbelly and Blind Lemon Jefferson, who would become known as some of the early greats of the blues.

Other Dallas landmarks within Deep Ellum include The Palace Shop at 2814 Main Street (around 1913) and Parks Brothers Warehouse at 2639 Elm Street (around 1923).

=== Entertainment district ===
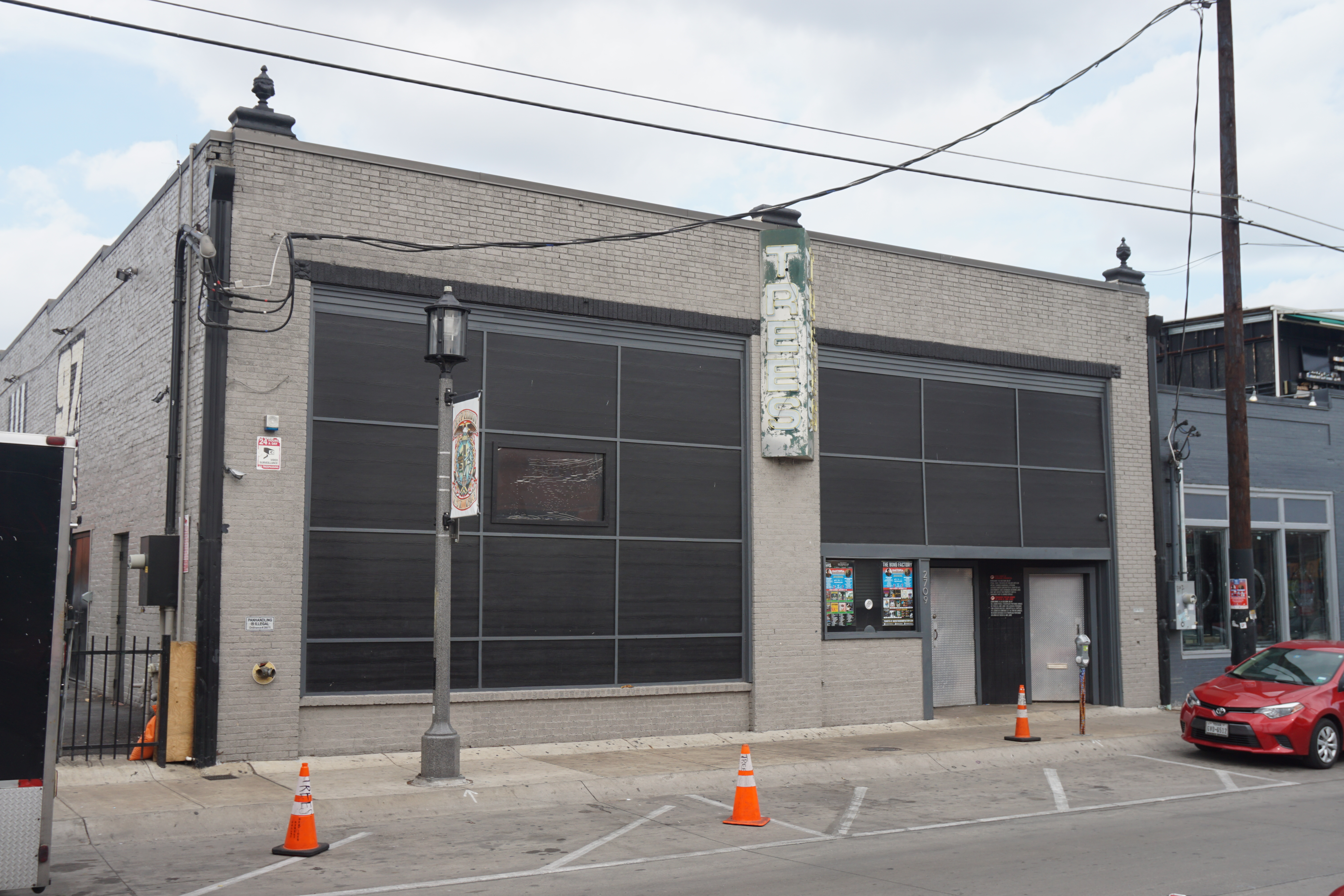
Trees in 2017

After decades of neglect, the 1980s and 90s marked a return for Deep Ellum as Dallas' liveliest entertainment district. At that time, it had become such a popular attraction that the streets often were blocked off to traffic, especially on weekends. It also spawned several events, such as the Deep Ellum Film Festival and Deep Ellum Arts Festival.

By 1991, Deep Ellum had 57 bars and nightclubs. Restaurants, tattoo parlors, other diverse retail shops, and increasing high-rent residential loft spaces were available. Over time, though, the streets became much emptier on weekend nights than in the 1990s. New events such as the Culture of Deep Ellum (CODE) events, and Dallas Rock Meetup Group monthly festival, involve multivenue, multiband performances that help to maintain Deep Ellum's viability as a live-music hotspot.

Notable businesses of the 1990s and beyond include The Curtain Club (closed in 2019), Deep Ellum Live (closed in 2004), Trees (closed late 2005, reopened August 2009), 2826, Club Dada (closed and reopened 2006), The Angry Dog (a restaurant, still in business), Monica's Aca y Alla (a restaurant, closed in 2012), Looker Hair Group (a salon), Galaxy Club (closed early 2007), the Green Room (closed September 2006, reopened 2010, closed 2011, reopened June 2013), and The Red Blood Club (closed and reopened 2007, and then closed again in 2008, and then reopened again in March 2014). Lizard Lounge stood for 28 years as a mecca of electronic music and Goth/post-punk, but closed in May 2020. Dallas Comedy House opened in 2009, closed and reopened in 2019, and closed in 2020. Dallas Comedy Club opened in 2021 in the building formerly occupied by Dallas Comedy House. The area was also host to two local breweries in the 2010s: Deep Ellum Brewing, and BrainDead Brewing (closed in 2021).

=== Crime ===
Since 2020, Deep Ellum has struggled with the reputation of a major crime problem on holiday and weekend nights. Also since 2020, many locals nicknamed the neighborhood Gotham City because of the concerning amount of random crime and violence that commonly occurs at night.

In mid-2006, local papers had begun to report the near-demise of the neighborhood, as a large percentage of the long-time live-music venues had closed that year, leaving mostly clubs oriented more towards recorded dance music and drinking, radically altering the "vibe". In 2007, several additional small and medium clubs had closed, although new live-music venues often sprang up.

Perhaps the most known and tragic crime associated with the area that garnered nationwide attention was the murder of two children by their father. On May 2, 2001, John Battaglia murdered his daughters Faith and Liberty in his loft in Deep Ellum.

In 2007, the City of Dallas encouraged large-scale residential, multifamily dwelling construction in Deep Ellum, in hopes of making it more financially successful.

In 2014 and 2015, several projects that improved infrastructure were undertaken, such as a comprehensive repaving of the street and road surfaces to add more parking and make the rough and worn sections of the pavement much better for vehicular and foot traffic. Deep Ellum continues to maintain and grow its place as a cultural and musical center for the DFW Metroplex. Despite the decline of a decade ago, visitors can now walk down Elm Street on a weekend and witness hundreds of pedestrians, bicycles, motorcycles, and automobiles, with dozens of venues, restaurants, storefronts, and parking lots, even during the COVID-19 pandemic.

In 2018, scooter companies flooded Deep Ellum with scooters and the city was not prepared to regulate them, leading to a public-safety issue due to people riding them on the crowded sidewalk. Motorized scooters are no longer allowed to be ridden in the neighborhood on the sidewalks.

In 2019, crime in Deep Ellum had a slight increase in minor crimes after years of improvement. Until the summer of that year, several crimes in the area were reported and prosecuted.

In May 2020, several businesses in Deep Ellum were vandalized and looted following a protest in downtown Dallas. A peaceful protest following the murder of George Floyd turned violent when a small group clashed with police, broke out windows, looted businesses, and set fires.

In July 2025, Dallas officials decided to stop car traffic in the streets of Deep Ellum at 10 p.m. on weekends to increase public safety at night. The city also increased its police presence in the area on weekend nights.

On the night of 31 October 2026, Halloween, three separate shootings struck the Deep Ellum neighborhood within roughly an hour and 15 minutes. The shootings left four people dead and 15 others injured. Dallas Police Chief Daniel Comeaux said investigators were still working to establish whether the three shootings were linked, and that some arrests had been made. However,he did not specify how many people were detained or what charges they faced.

== Music ==
=== Jazz and blues ===
Deep Ellum's claim to fame has been its music. In the 1920s and 1930s, the neighborhood had become a hotbed for early jazz and blues musicians, hosting such as Blind Lemon Jefferson, Blind Willie Johnson, Robert Johnson (who recorded 27 tracks with Don Law in a nearby Vitagraph recording studio in downtown Dallas), Huddie "Lead Belly" Ledbetter, the young T-Bone Walker, Lightnin' Hopkins, Whistlin' Alex Moore, and Bessie Smith. These and other musicians performed on the streets and in Deep Ellum clubs such as The Gypsy Tea Room, The Harlem and The Palace. From 1920 to 1950, the number of nightclubs, cafes, and domino parlors in Deep Ellum jumped from 12 to 20.

In 1937, a columnist described Deep Ellum as:

...[the] one spot in the city that needs no daylight saving time because there is no bedtime...[It is] the only place recorded on earth where business, religion, hoodooism, gambling, and stealing goes on at the same time without friction...Last Saturday a prophet held the best audience in this 'Madison Square Garden' in announcing that Jesus Christ would come to Dallas in person in 1939. At the same time a pickpocket was lifting a week's wages from another guy's pocket, who stood with open mouth to hear the prophecy.

At the time, you could find gun and locksmith shops, clothing stores, the Cotton Club, tattoo studios, barber-shops, pawn shops, drugstores, tea rooms, loan offices, domino halls, pool halls, and walk-up hotels. On its sidewalks you could find pigeon droppers, reefer men, craps shooters, card sharps, and sellers of cocaine and marijuana. Sometime around World War I, Lead Belly and Blind Lemon Jefferson got together and began composing folk tunes, with Dallas often in the lyrics. In a song called "Take A Whiff on Me":

Walked up Ellum an' I come down Main,
Tryin' to bum a nickel jes' to buy cocaine.
Ho, Ho, baby, take a whiff on me.

The most famous song about the district was recorded in 1933 under the title of "Deep Elm Blues" by the Lone Star Cowboys. The song and the lyrics were derived from the Georgia Crackers' 1927 recording, "The Georgia Black Bottom". The Shelton Brothers recorded "Deep Elem Blues" on Decca in 1935. Despite these earlier recordings, they claimed credit for the song. The lyrics narrate white men seeking immoral and illegal entertainment in an African-American part of town. The Shelton Brothers iterated the name of the district in "Deep Elem Blues, No. 2", "What's the Matter with Deep Elem", and "Deep Elm Boogie Woogie Blues". Dick Stabile and his Orchestra, the Texas Wanderers, and the Wilburn Brothers all invoked the district's name in separate Decca pressings.

"Deep Ellum Blues" was later performed by the Grateful Dead:

When you go down on Deep Ellum,
Put your money in your socks
'Cause them women on Deep Ellum
Sho' will throw you on the rocks. (chorus)
Oh, sweet mama, your daddy's got them Deep Ellum Blues.
Oh, sweet mama, your daddy's got them Deep Ellum Blues.

Bob Dylan's album Rough and Rowdy Ways (release June 19, 2020) has the song "Murder Most Foul" with the line "... / When you're down on Deep Ellum, put your money in your shoe /..." (© & P Columbia Records)

Following World War II, the success of old Deep Ellum started to fade. The ever-growing availability and use of the automobile led to the removal of the Houston and Texas Central railroad tracks—to make way for Central Expressway—and by 1956 the streetcar line had been removed. Businesses closed, residents moved to the suburbs and the music all but stopped. In 1969, a new elevation of Central Expressway truncated Deep Ellum, completely obliterating the 2400 block of Elm Street, viewed by many as the center of the neighborhood. By the 1970s, few original businesses remained.

=== 1983–1999: The New "Glory Days" of Deep Ellum ===
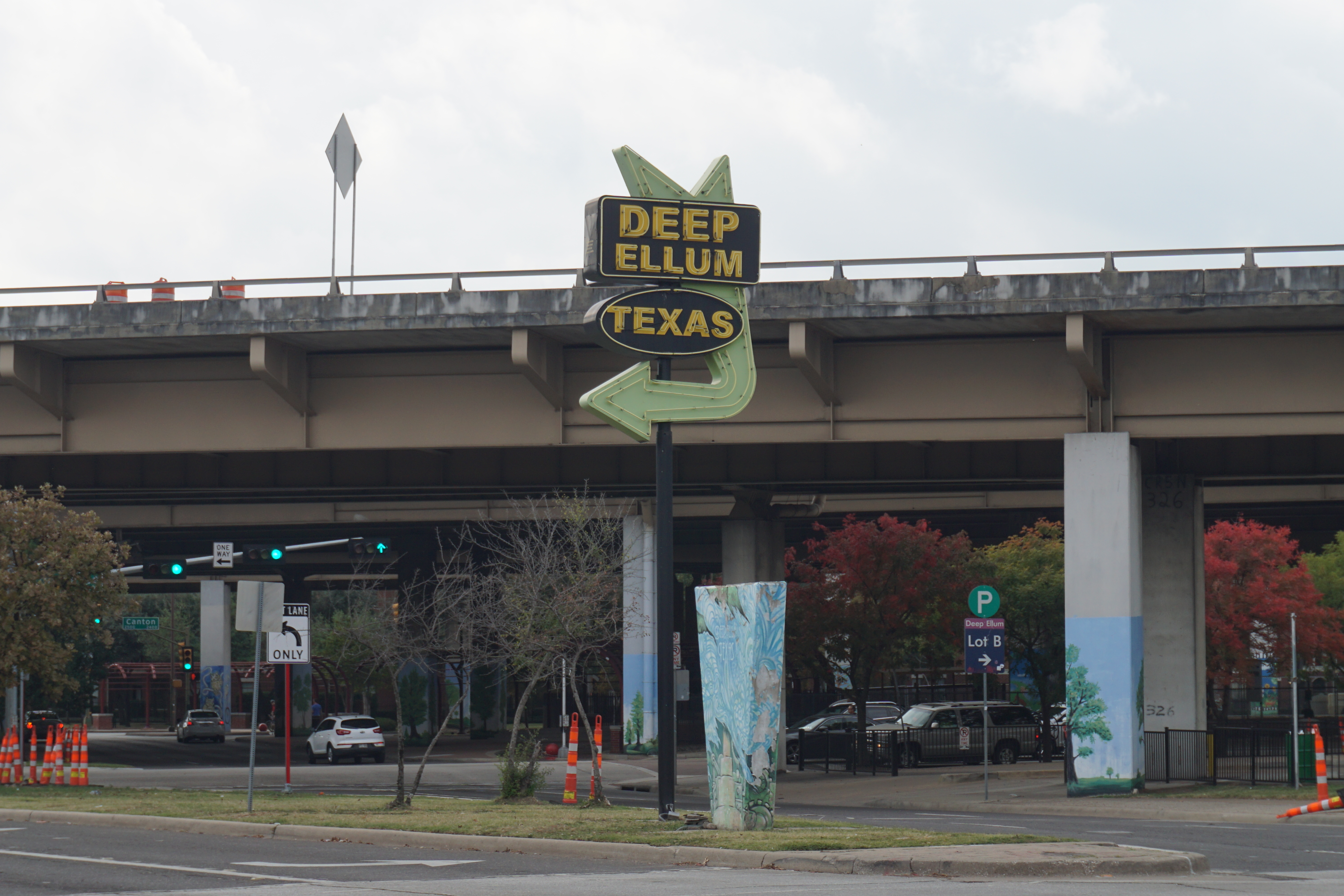
Deep Ellum Neon Sign

In 1983, the Near East Side Area Planning Study, or "Deep Ellum Plan", was commissioned, as the city sought to "downzone" Deep Ellum, meaning that building height, population, and street width were to be carefully monitored so as to help the neighborhood maintain an artistic, historic atmosphere. Visual artists, musicians, and entrepreneurs began to move into the area, opening up new galleries and venues, attracting young creatives. Though dormant for years, a new can-do spirit was re-awakening in downtown. Over the course of the 1980s, the Dallas tourism bureau formally promoted the West End Historic District (Dallas) as a destination for business and political class conventioneers, including those attending the 1984 Republican National Convention. Meanwhile, the Dallas Gay scene and the debauchery of well-monied Dallasites and visiting celebrities and hangers-on partying in downtown discotheques became the stuff of legends, as venues such as The Old Plantation and The Starck Club (financed by Philippe Starck and Stevie Nicks) flourished. For its part, Deep Ellum on the east side of downtown near Fair Park became known as an organic, DIY breeding ground for the Dallas Art, Roots (Americana), and Punk Scenes.

With the insurgence of new nightclubs and venues, Deep Ellum began to explode as a music spot, featuring local stalwarts such as The Reverend Horton Heat, Shallow Reign, Three on a Hill, and Loco Gringos, and underground regional acts such as The Flaming Lips from Oklahoma City, Butthole Surfers from San Antonio, Meat Puppets from Arizona, and True Believers (band) from Austin. Influential music venues included Twilight Room, Adair's Saloon, Prophet Bar, Theatre Gallery, Club Clearview, Club Dada, and 500x Cafe. Young artists such as Rhett Miller, Sara Hickman, and The Dixie Chicks frequently busked for tips on the streets and in small shops. Local radio stations began playing demo tapes and broadcasting the live performances of "Deep Ellum Bands." Alternative media and music weeklies such as The Dallas Observer and Buddy Magazine devoted regular columns to covering the scene.However, throughout the mid '80s, the neighborhood still faced serious safety issues, including all the usual vices (sex during the onslaught of AIDS, drugs, underage drinking) and the presence of skinheads, but as Deep Ellum continued to expand, the threats dwindled. By 1991, over 50 nightclubs and bars had opened in Deep Ellum.

By the 1990s, musical acts including Toadies, Erykah Badu, Edie Brickell and the New Bohemians, Tripping Daisy, and Old 97's began to gain prominence as not only local successes, but national stars. Older stalwarts like Ronnie Dawson (musician) and Ray Wylie Hubbard found a new audience in venues such as Deep Ellum's Sons of Hermann Hall. Once Deep Ellum had gained traction as the heart of music in Dallas, popular touring artists such as Nirvana, Pearl Jam, Smashing Pumpkins, Red Hot Chili Peppers, Radiohead, The Roots, The Notorious B.I.G., and Fugazi would book shows at venues including Trees Dallas and The Bomb Factory.

Although Deep Ellum's popularity and vitality continues to wax and wane through the years, its relevance as a music hub for Dallas and the region persists.

== Street art ==
In addition to live music, Deep Ellum was a hotbed for the emerging genre of street art. Many of the music venues used graffiti artists to advertise music shows.

In 1991, the city commissioned local artists to create murals along the Good-Latimer Expressway tunnel (a major entry to the neighborhood) in a project organized by artist Frank Campagna, which he named TunnelVisions. The tunnel was demolished in the spring of 2007 to make way for the DART Green Line train. In 2009, Campagna led artists in the completion of a mural project along the redesigned Good-Latimer gateway, and subsequently, additional mural projects in the adjacent art park under the I-30 overpass at Good Latimer between Commerce and Canton streets. The wide variety of images, largely in a 'graffiti' style, have long been a popular tourist attraction.

While street art is popular in Deep Ellum, a large portion of the murals in the area are commissioned by local businesses. Some of the most recognizable murals were created by Frank Campagna, owner of Kettle Art Gallery, and alternately known as the Godfather of Dallas Street Art, for legendary music venues such as Gypsy Tea Room and Trees. Most recently, the 42 mural project invited a select number of artists to paint murals throughout Deep Ellum, in hopes of passing along the history and heritage of the area. In 2021, a 8,500 square foot mural was completed for The Stack office building, becoming one of the largest Deep Ellum murals ever painted.

== Transportation ==
=== Highways ===
- Interstate 345 ( US 75/ I-45 connection)

(US 67, US 80, and US 175 have all previously passed through parts of Deep Ellum, but are now routed onto nearby freeways.)

=== Trains ===
- DART Green Line
  - Deep Ellum Station
  - Baylor University Medical Center Station

== Education ==
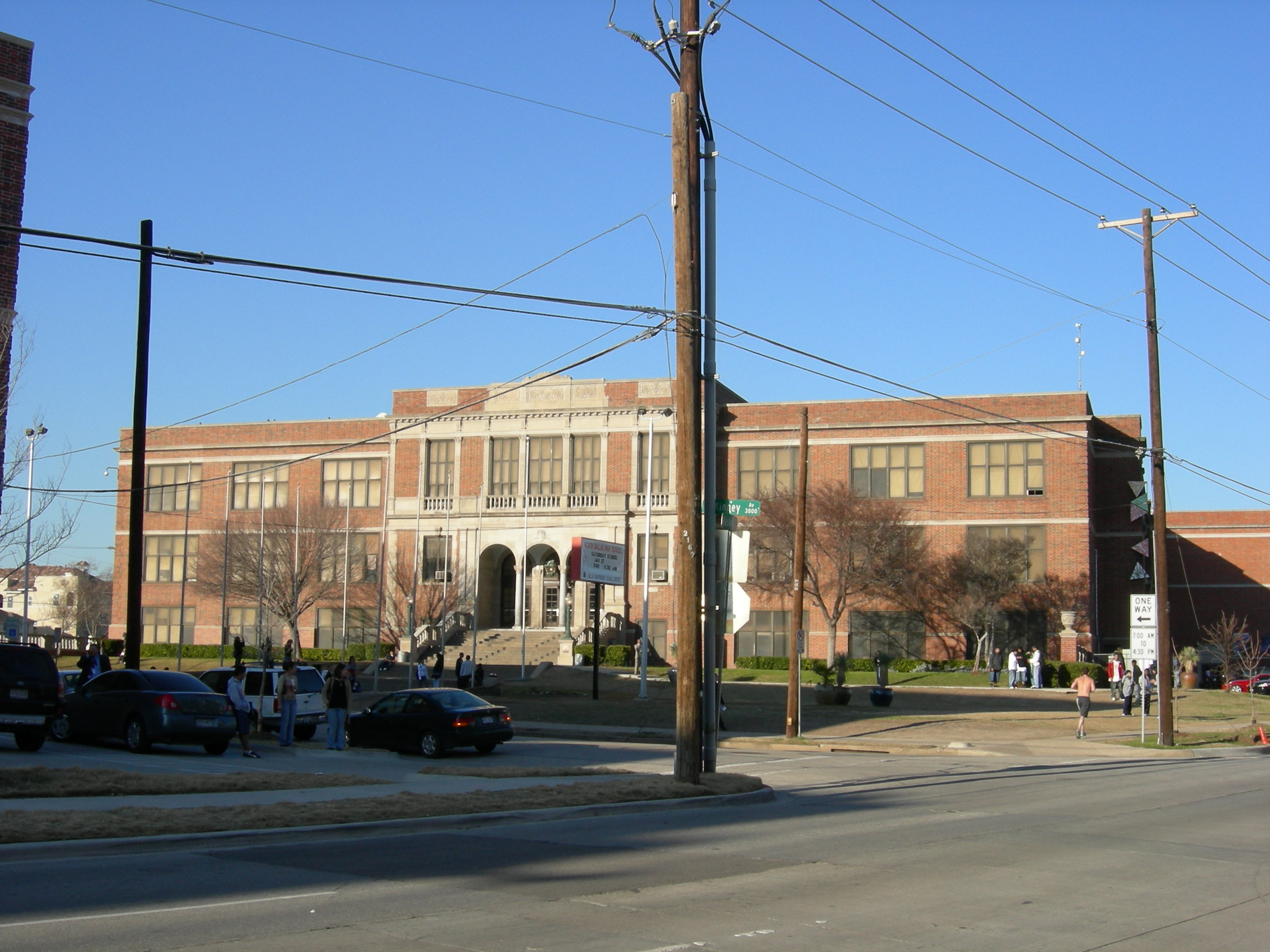
North Dallas High School serves residents north of Commerce Street

Deep Ellum is served by the Dallas Independent School District.

Residents of Deep Ellum north of Commerce Street are zoned to Ignacio Zaragoza Elementary School, Alex W. Spence Middle School and North Dallas High School. Residents south of Commerce Street are zoned to Martin Luther King Jr. Learning Center (Elementary School), Billy Earl Dade Middle School, and James Madison High School. Residents of the southern portion were previously zoned to City Park Elementary School in Cedars.

Deep Ellum is also home to a charter secondary school, Uplift Luna Preparatory which opened in 2010. It is considered a high performing school, according to state reports.
