= Joseph Monroe =

American politician (c. 1830-c.1900)

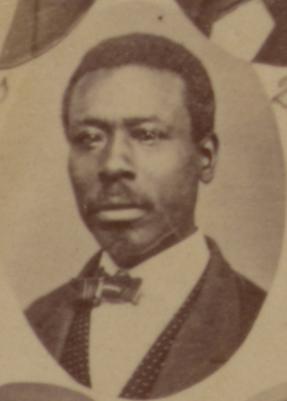
Photograph by E. von Seutter, 1874

Joseph E. Monroe (born c.1830) was a state legislator in Mississippi.

Joseph Monroe was born in Kentucky. He represented Coahoma County in the Mississippi House of Representatives from 1874 to 1877. He was a member of the Knights of Pythias of North America, South America, Europe, Asia, Africa and Australia.

Monroe and his wife, Jane, had two children. She was listed as a widow in 1900.

== See also ==
- African American officeholders from the end of the Civil War until before 1900
