= Knights of Pythias Temple (Dallas, Texas) =

Building in Dallas, Texas

Coordinates: 32.7842°N 96.7871°W

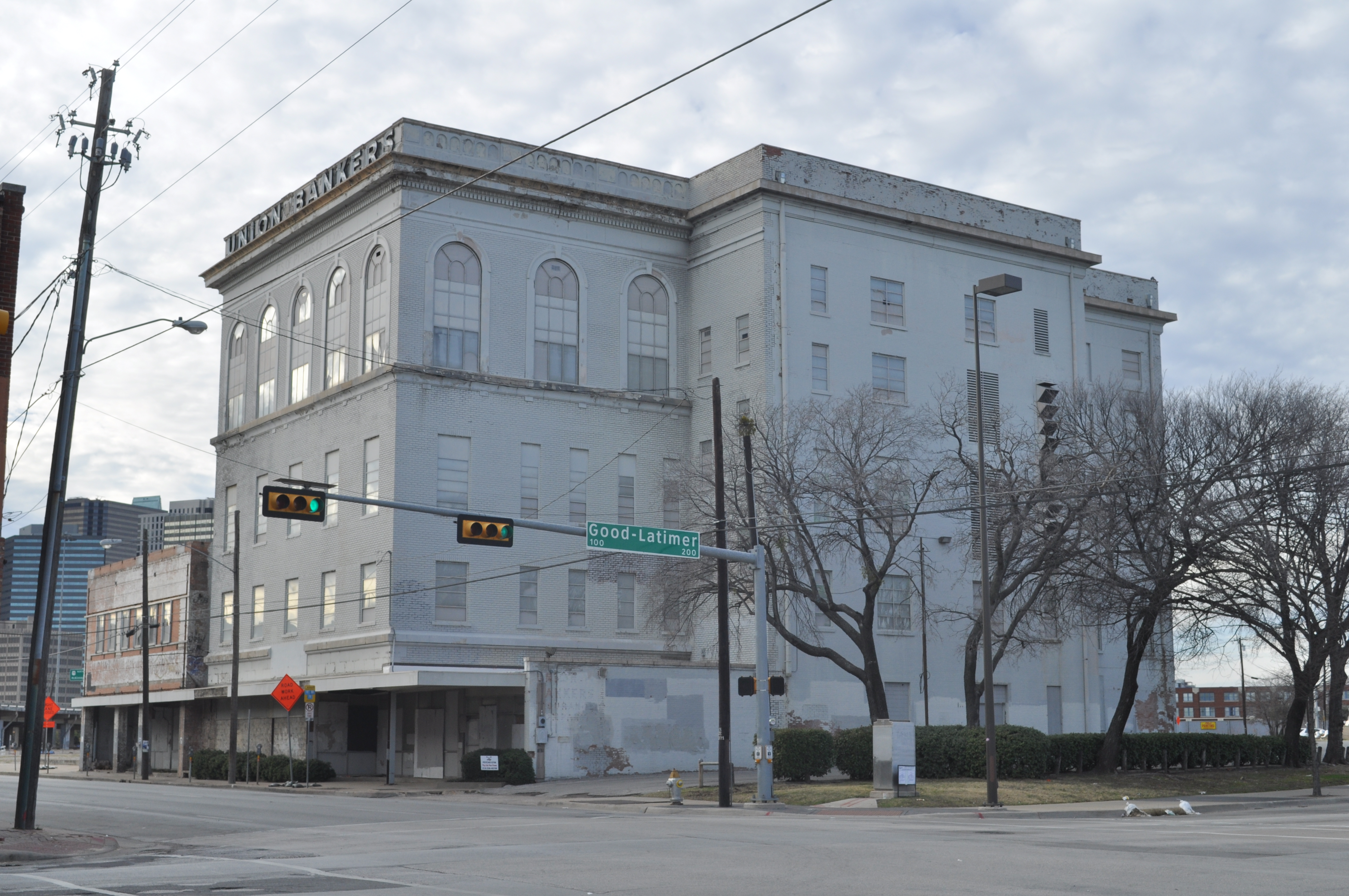
- Knights of Pythias Temple, 2013
- Interactive map of the Knights of Pythias Temple area

General information
- Type: Fraternal Organization
- Architectural style: Beaux Arts
- Location: 2551 Elm Street
- Completed: 1916

Technical details
- Floor count: 4

Design and construction
- Architect: William Sidney Pittman
- Awards and prizes

Dallas Landmark

The Knights of Pythias Temple is an historic Knights of Pythias building located at 2551 Elm Street in the Deep Ellum neighborhood of Dallas, Texas. Now operating as the Pittman Hotel, and previously also known as the Union Bankers Building, it was designed by African-American architect William Sidney Pittman and opened in 1916. Current renovations by Perkins + Will date to 2020.

== Construction and original use ==
The Knights of Pythias Temple was designed by William Sidney Pittman and first occupied in 1916.. The primary tenant was the state headquarters of the Grand Lodge of Texas of the Knights of Pythias of North America, South America, Europe, Asia, Africa and Australia. The building was designed for multiple purposes. There were storefronts for a barber shop and a drug store, second floor offices serving African-American physicians and other professionals, with life insurance companies and other institutions filling out the space on the third floor. The fourth floor featured a ballroom and other public space. The overall design was neoclassical, but with red brick cladding, and tall arched windows looking out from the top floor.

The Knights of Pythias Temple was the first major commercial structure in Dallas built for African-Americans, by African-Americans, and with African-American money. From 1916 to 1939 it served as the social, professional and cultural center of the center of the city's African-American community. The ballroom hosted the performing arts and lectures, with some notable appearances by the Fisk Jubilee Singers, Marcus Garvey, and George Washington Carver.

== Later uses ==
Due to financial difficulties, the Knights of Pythias were forced to sell the temple to Ben Ackerman in 1946. In turn, a lawsuit forced Ackerman to sell the temple for $100,000 in 1956. Meanwhile, the local Pythians relocated to a second floor office facing their former temple. In 1959 the building was purchased by the Union Bankers Insurance Company, which turned it into a standard office building.

The old lettering for the Knights of Pythias still adorned the building into the early 1980s, when Union Bankers obscured the old name. Local preservationists secured an injunction to force Union Bankers to uncover the old name displayed on the facade. The city designated the site as a Dallas Landmark in 1989. Union Bankers abandoned the site in the 1990s. Though various restoration projects and redevelopment have been proposed over the last two decades, it has been unoccupied through 2017. Many first hand sources of information on the building maintained their records, although some were destroyed. In 2017, a consortium of developers announced a plan to redevelop the block, including a restoration of the red brick cladding of the Knights of Pythias Temple.

As of 2023 the hotel operated under the Kimpton brands, and is considered the first luxury hotel in Deep Ellum.

== Gallery ==
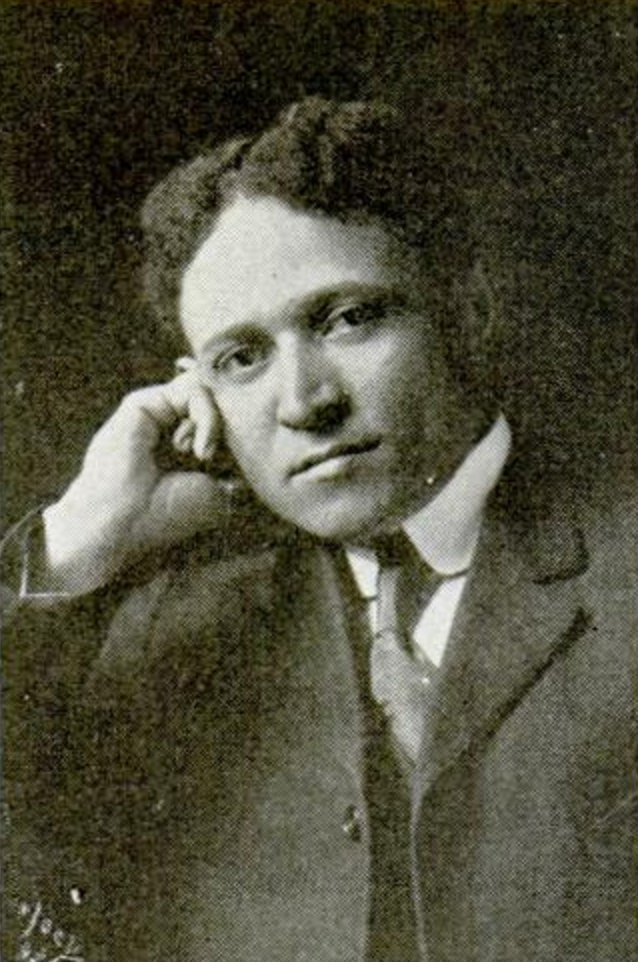
William Sidney Pittman, designing architect, circa 1916

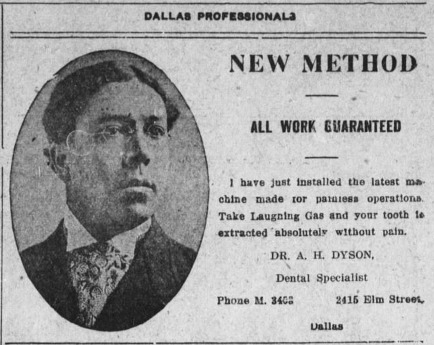
Advertisement for dentist office at the Knights of Pythias Temple, 1919

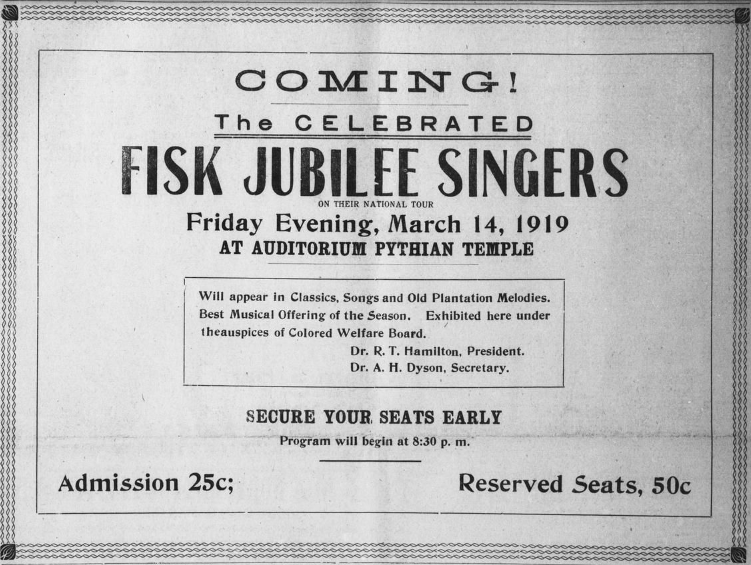
Advertisement for performance at the Knights of Pythias Temple, 1919

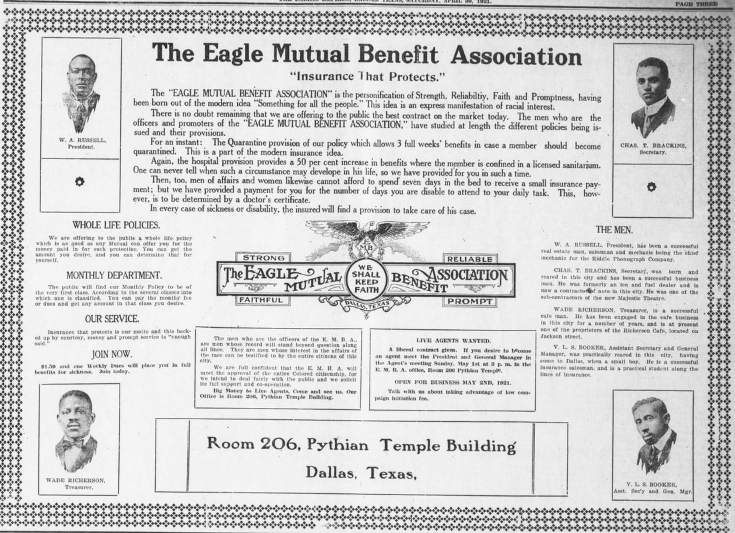
Advertisement for insurance company at the Knights of Pythias Temple, 1921

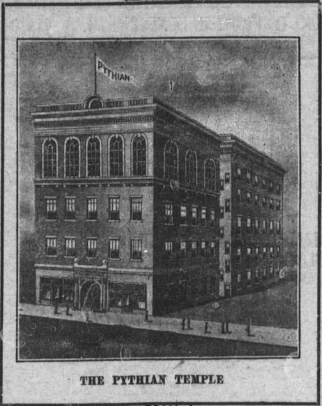
Image from The Dallas Express of the Knights of Pythias Temple, Elm Street, Dallas, Texas
