= John C. Tyson (librarian) =

African-American librarian (1951–1995)

- Born: August 4, 1951; Richlands, Virginia
- Died: November 7, 1995 (aged 44)
- Education: Concord College; University of Illinois; West Virginia University; Simmons College
- Occupation: Former State Librarian of Virginia

John C. Tyson (August 4, 1951 – November 7, 1995) was the first African-American State Librarian of Virginia. Tyson received his bachelor's degree from Concord College in West Virginia and master's degrees from the University of Illinois and West Virginia University, and his doctorate in library administration from Simmons College in Boston.

Tyson was appointed Virginia State Librarian by Governor Douglas Wilder in 1990. He was the first African American to hold the position in Virginia and only the second in the nation to head a state library system. Tyson was a strong advocate of public access to state library resources and spearheaded efforts to connect the Library of Virginia to all libraries in the Commonwealth.

Tyson served for five years as University Librarian at the University of Richmond and was a founding member of the Black Caucus of the American Library Association.

== See also ==
- Library science
- Samuel W. Starks
