= Knights of Pythias of North America, South America, Europe, Asia, Africa and Australia =

African American fraternal organization

- Founded: 1880; 146 years ago Vicksburg, Mississippi
- Type: Fraternal order
- Affiliation: Independent
- Status: Active
- Emphasis: African Americans
- Scope: North America
- Members: 200,000+ lifetime
- Headquarters: United States

The Knights of Pythias of North America, South America, Europe, Asia, Africa, and Australia, also known as the Colored Knights of Pythias or the Knights of Pythias, is a fraternal organization in the United States. The Knights of Pythias, founded in 1864, did not allow African Americans so this group formed on its own. The organization was established in Vicksburg, Mississippi in 1880 by Thomas W. Stringer and others.

The organization followed the organizational structure of many other fraternal organizations with a national Supreme Lodge, Grand Lodges at the state level, and local lodges regionally. Historically, the organization provided its members with death and sick benefits.

== History ==
The Knights of Pythias, founded in 1864, did not allow African Americans and so this group formed on its own. The Knights of Pythias of North America, Europe, Asia, Africa, and Oceanica was established in Vicksburg, Mississippi, in 1880 by Thomas W. Stringer, along with Thomas M. Broadwater, A. E. Lightfoot, George A. Place, W. D. Starks, Claybourne Julian. This became the Lightfoot Lodge No. 1. Its purpose was friendship and to relieve suffering. Membership was open to all races though it was primarily an African American membership. Stringer was its first Supreme Chancellor.

There are competing accounts for how the founders learned the rituals from the Knights of Pythias. Descriptions range from some of the men who could pass as white joining the white organization and then bringing the rituals back or a white member of the Knights of Pythias sharing the rituals with Stringer and the others. The organization quickly spread under Stringer's leadership. Its name was later changed to Knights of Pythias of North America, South America, Europe, Asia, Africa, and Australia.

The Colored Knights of Pythias were prominent in the United States in the late 19th and early 20th centuries. By 1897, the Knights of Pythias had 40,000 members, with grand lodges in twenty states, the West Indies, and Central America. It distributed US$60,000 worth of benefits annually.

Order of Calanthe, the women's auxiliary to the Knights of Pythias, was established in Louisiana in 1883 and was open to the family of Colored Knights of Pythias members. Calanthe was the wife of Pythias in the Greek legend Damon and Pythias.

In 1891, the Supreme Lodge paraded through New York City with a contingent of seven hundred Sir Knights in full uniform. In 1905, there were eight lodges in New York state and 340 members. The New York branch's second annual convention in the state was held in Brooklyn. The Grand Lodge of Michigan was organized on September 22, 1922, in Detroit, Michigan, with J. Will Cooper as the first Grand Chancellor.

A lawsuit was filed in Georgia challenging the organization's use of the Knights of Pythias name and paraphernalia. The suit was a focus of concern at the group's National Convention held in Kansas City, Missouri in 1909. The white Pythians of Georgia finally lost in the Supreme Court in 1912 and both groups were allowed to use the name.

The Colored Knights of Pythias had nearly 200,000 members in the 1920s; this was the height of the group's enrollment. It had strong membership in Florida; as high as one in six Black men. After World War I, the Florida organization required members to pay poll taxes and register to vote in the 1920 election. In Quincy, Florida, this drew the ire of the Ku Klux Klan which burned the Knights' group's lodge and killed as many as thirty and sixty Black men.

In the 1950s, the Knights of Pythias began admitting Black members. However, both the White and Black Knights members had declined during the Great Depression and never recovered. In some cities the two groups merged. However, the Washington, D.C. lodge did not accept a Black member until 1989. As of 2015, the Knights of Pythias of North America, South America, Europe, Asia, Africa and Australia still existed but in extremely reduced numbers.

== Symbols and traditions ==
Like the Knights of Pythias, the Colored Knights of Pythias' motto is “Friendship, Charity, and Benevolence”. It followed the organizational structure of many other fraternal organizations with a national Supreme Lodge, Grand Lodges at the state level, and local lodges regionally. Its lessons and rituals were based on the ancient Greek legend of the friendship of Damon and Pythias.

In the late 19th and early 20th century, members marched in public parades wearing military-style uniforms.

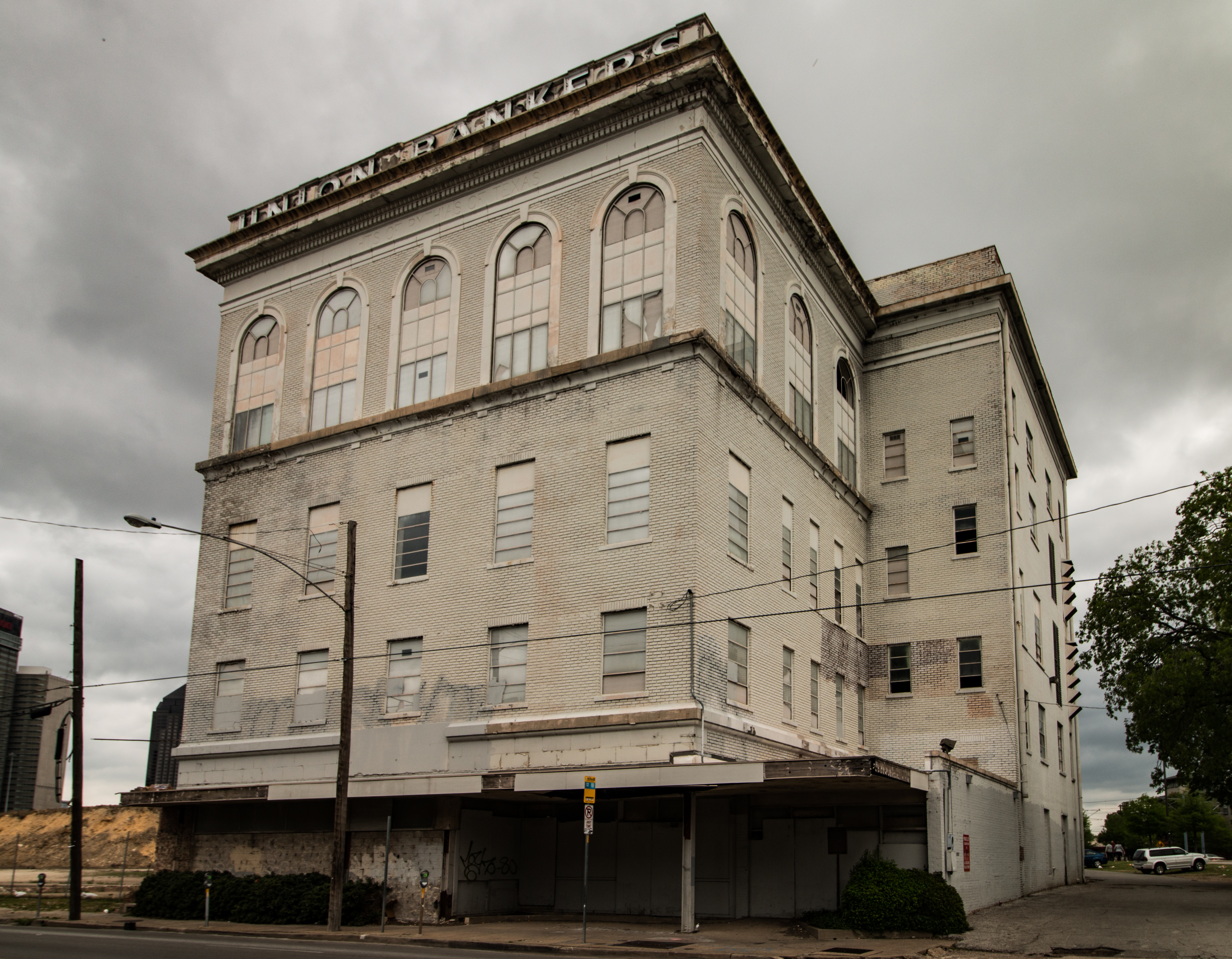
Knights of Pythias Temple, Dallas, Texas

== Temples ==
The Colored Knights of Pythias constructed buildings called temples to house each lodge. The temples provided space for lodge meetings and frequently provided office space for African American professionals and the fraternal society's insurance business.

Chicago was chosen for the Supreme Temple in 1906. Frank Hunter was chosen to design a Grand Lodge by the group's Indianapolis branches. It was dedicated in 1911 and remains standing at 701-703 North Senate. The Indianapolis Recorder was a tenant.

A former lodge in Waxahachie, Texas is now home to Ellis County African American Hall of Fame Museum and Library.

Other notable Colored Knights of Pythias temples include:

- New Granada Theater in Pittsburgh designed by Louis Bellinger
- Pythian National Temple in Chicago (1928) designed by Walter T. Bailey
- Knights of Pythias Temple (Dallas, Texas) was designed by William Sidney Pittman (1919). It housed the grand lodge and state headquarters for Texas.

== Notable members ==
- Oscar W. Adams Sr., journalist and publisher of the Birmingham Reporter
- Louis Armstrong, jazz trumpeter and singer
- Walter T. Bailey, architect
- Robert F. Boyd, physician and dentist
- Matthew W. Bullock, lawyer, politician, and human rights activist.
- Henry Alvin Cameron, educator and World War I casualty
- Miles Dewey Davis Jr., dentist and father of jazz trumpeter Miles Davis
- Dan Desdunes, civil rights activist and musician
- Sumner Alexander Furniss, physician and surgeon
- Don S.S. Goodloe, principal of the Maryland Normal and Industrial School at Bowie for the Training of Colored Youth, which later became Bowie State University
- Edward D. Green, Illinois House of Representatives
- W. C. Handy, blues composer and musician
- Benjamin Hooks, executive director of the National Association for the Advancement of Colored People
- William Thomas Jefferson, dentist
- Chester W. Keatts, politician and co-founded the Mosaic Templars of America
- James A. Merriman, physician and newspaper publisher
- John Mitchell Jr., journalist and editor of the Richmond Planet
- Joseph Monroe, member of the Mississippi House of Representatives
- T. Gillis Nutter, member of the West Virginia Legislature
- Edward W. Pearson Sr., real estate developer, Buffalo Soldier and Spanish–American War veteran
- William R. Pettiford, minister and banker
- Charles Victor Roman, doctor and professor
- Paris Simkins, South Carolina House of Representatives
- A. Maceo Smith, civil rights activist
- Samuel W. Starks, West Virginia state librarian
- Herbert M. St. Clair, businessman, investor, and city councilman
- Thomas W. Stringer, member of the Mississippi Senate
- George Edwin Taylor, journalist and first African American to run for president
- Jacob C. White Jr., educator, intellectual, and civil rights activist
- A. Wilberforce Williams, doctor and journalist
- Butler R. Wilson, attorney, civil rights activist

== See also ==
- Prince Hall Freemasonry
- Grand United Order of Odd Fellows
- Improved Benevolent and Protective Order of Elks of the World
- List of general fraternities
