= Trees Dallas =

Live music venue in Dallas, Texas, US

Coordinates: 32.7847°N 96.7844°W

Trees
- Trees Dallas
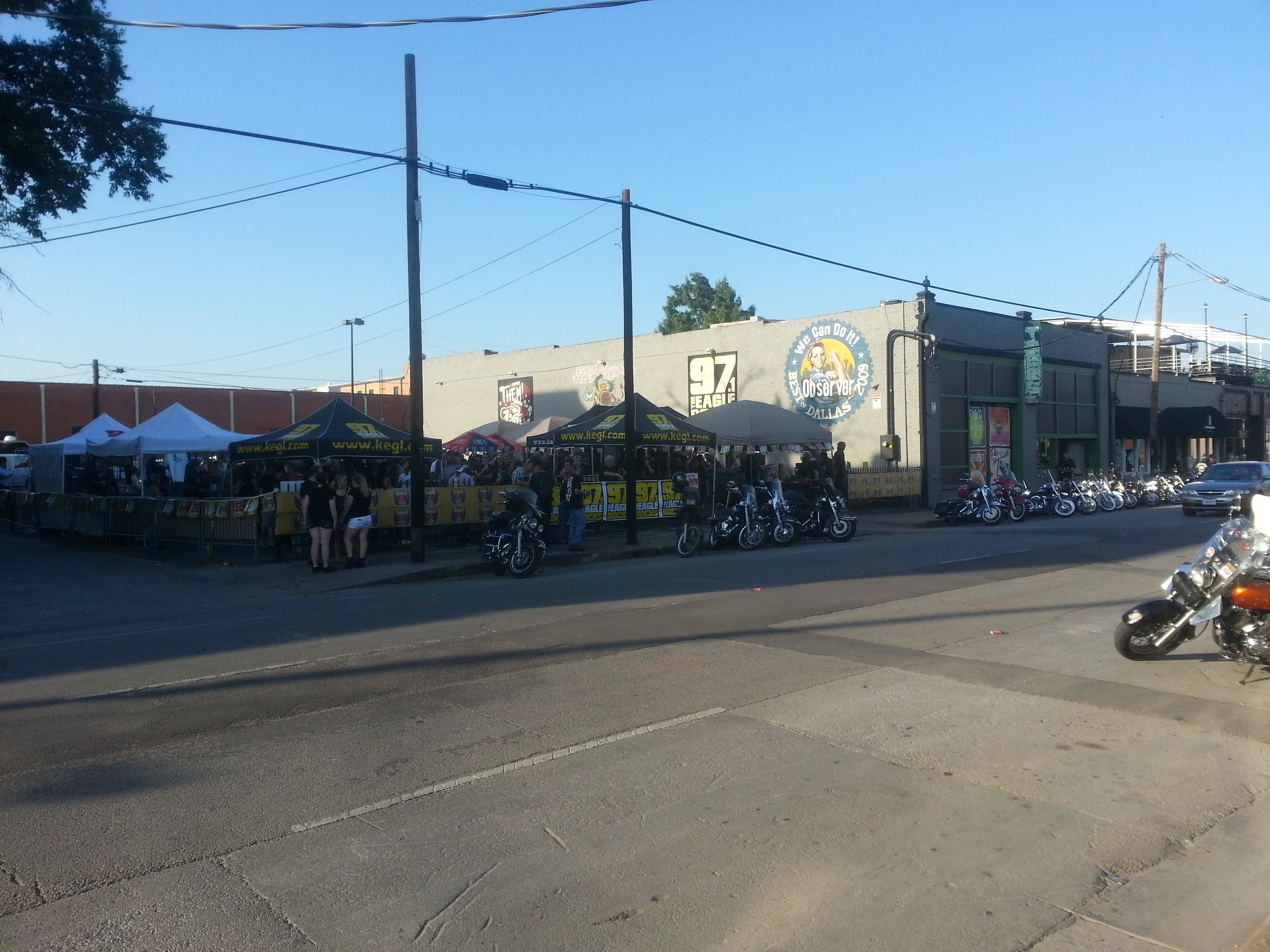
- Trees Dallas during Ride for Dime
- Interactive map of Trees
- Address: 2709 Elm Street; Dallas, Texas, United States
- Owner: Clint and Whitney Barlow
- Seating type: Bi-level standing and seating
- Capacity: 600
- Type: Night club
- Event: Various

Construction
- Opened: May 1990
- Renovated: 2009
- Closed: May 2005
- Reopened: 2009

Website
- Official website

Trees is an American live music venue opened in 1990 in the Deep Ellum district of downtown Dallas, Texas. The venue has hosted international touring musical acts such as Nirvana, Snoop Dogg, the Flaming Lips, Death Grips, Daughter, the Wailers, Nick Jonas, and Run the Jewels. It has received numerous accolades from the Dallas Observer.

Trees first opened its doors as a venue in May 1990. Named for its trunk-like support beams, Trees hosted bands including Nirvana, Radiohead, Mazzy Star, Pearl Jam, and the Afghan Whigs during its initial run as a venue before the club closed in May 2005. It was reopened on August 14, 2009, by Clint Barlow, former drummer for Vanilla Ice, and spouse Whitney Barlow. Since its resurrection, the venue has seen acts including Hiatus Kaiyote, Matt Corby, Charlie Puth, Robert DeLong, Charli XCX, and Jess Glynne.

== Notable events ==
- On Friday, May 4, 2010, Deftones played a secret album release show at Trees. The performance followed an early evening, intimate fan Q&A webcast hosted by 102.1 The Edge and moderated by Jessie Jessup, during which the band premiered their new album, Diamond Eyes, completely live. Their Trees performance was announced shortly before the show and sold out immediately. The band played a 21-song set.
- At the Drive-In performed a reunion show at Trees on Tuesday, April 10, 2012. El Paso-based psychedelic rock band Zechs Marquise were the opening act.
- On Saturday, May 30, 2015, Dallas-based rapper Post Malone played his first ever sold-out show at Trees. As he only had a few songs recorded at the time of the show, his set, which featured two performances of his hit single, "White Iverson", ran approximately 25 minutes.
- Body Count, the rap-metal band co-founded by Ice-T in 1990, performed live at Trees on Saturday, August 22, 2015, for the Trees' 6th Anniversary show. Denver hardcore outfit The News Can Wait along with Dallas local bands Downlo and Mad Mexicans were the supporting acts.

== Nirvana Trees incident ==
On October 19, 1991, Nirvana played an infamous set at Trees to a completely sold out crowd. As the show was booked before the band released their breakout hit album, Nevermind, the venue was not large enough to accommodate the number of fans that came. Nirvana's tour manager demanded last minute that Trees hire heightened security, as there was no barrier between the stage and the crowd. The show was documented by Brad Featherstone on the now infamous video tape, who was standing behind Novoselic's bass amplifier.

Turner Van Blarcum was one of the security guards assigned to keep fans off of the stage, but once Nirvana's set began, fans began to bombard them. During the guitar solo for the song "Love Buzz", Kurt Cobain dove into the crowd from just behind Van Blarcum's back. Van Blarcum - in what was already a tense situation when earlier in the set, Cobain smashed his Fender Mustang guitar into the front of house monitor console, damaging the expensive piece of equipment which belonged to his friend - began to hold and push Cobain in an aggressive, ostensibly vengeful, frustrated manner, back into the crowd. Cobain then struck Van Blarcum in the head with the butt of his Fender Jaguar guitar, opening up a large, bloody gash. When Cobain got himself back onto the stage, Van Blarcum then punched Cobain in the head from behind and the other two band mates confronted Blarcum - with drummer Dave Grohl leaping from his drum stool, up and over his over sized rack tom and bass drum - while he was restrained from Cobain by other security members and fans.

The audience erupted into madness, chanting "Bulltshit! Bullshit!" while Cobain stayed onstage with his guitar squealing in feedback for a minute before throwing it into the band's drum set. Trees' staff approached drummer Dave Grohl and bassist Krist Novoselic backstage, asking them to return to the stage. They agreed but had to find Cobain, who was hiding in a broom closet. Trees' staff brought him to the stage to finish the show. Once the show was over and the band were in a cab, a heated Van Blarcum punched the cab's window, shattering the glass all over the band. Ultimately, the band paid for both Van Blarcum's medical bills and for damage done to the venue.

== The Bomb Factory ==
After its initial closure in 1999, The Bomb Factory was reopened by current Trees owners Clint and Whitney Barlow on Thursday, March 26, 2015. The 4300 capacity venue was renovated before its resurrection, with the introduction of eight VIP suites, air conditioning, a new roof, a mezzanine section, and brand new light and sound systems. The Bomb Factory is Trees' sister venue. Erykah Badu performed at the venue on opening day.

== Canton Hall ==
On October 31, 2017, Clint and Whitney Barlow reopened Deep Ellum Live as Canton Hall, an indoor venue capable of holding up to 1100 people.

== Awards ==
- Consequence of Sound - The 100 Greatest American Music Venues, #61 - 2016
- Dallas Observer Best Rock Bar - 2012
- Dallas Observer Best Sound System - 2011
- Dallas Observer Best Rock Bar - 2010 (tied with The Bone)
- Dallas Observer Best Not-Quite-Nostalgia Fodder - 2009
- Dallas Observer Best Alternative Club - 2001
