= Harry Cameron (disambiguation) =

Harry Cameron was an ice hockey player.

Harry Cameron may also refer to:

- Harry Cameron (rugby league) (1947–2021), Australian rugby league footballer

== See also ==
- Henry Cameron (disambiguation)
- Harold Cameron (1912–2000), New Zealand cricketer
