= Expo Park =

Expo Park may refer to:

- Expo Commemoration Park in Suita, Osaka, Japan
- Expo Science Park in Daejeon, South Korea
- Exposition Park in University Park, Los Angeles, California
- Exposition Park in South Dallas, Texas
- Shanghai Expo Park in Pudong Shanghai, China
- World Expo Park in Brisbane, Queensland, Australia
