= Thomas W. Stringer =

American politician (1815–1893)

Thomas W. Stringer (1815–1893) was an American Christian minister in the A.M.E. Church, state senator in Mississippi, Prince Hall Mason, and the founder of the Knights of Pythias of North America, South America, Europe, Asia, Africa and Australia. He helped organize churches, schools, and fraternal organizations. He was elected to the Mississippi Senate in 1869 and served from 1870 until 1871.

Stringer was born in Maryland, and raised in North Buxton, Ontario, a settlement of Black Canadians. He later moved to Ohio, where he was ordained a minister of the African Methodist Episcopal Church. He was a highly successful AME missionary in Ohio and Canada, founding over thirty-five churches.

He moved to Vicksburg, Mississippi, after the American Civil War. Stringer was Union League organizer and credited as the founder of the Mississippi Republican party. He was an organizer at Mississippi's 1868 constitutional convention.

He is buried at the Vicksburg City Cemetery.

== Prince Hall Freemasonry ==
Stringer became a mason in 1836 at the Hiram Lodge No. 3 in Pennsylvania. Later when he moved to Ohio, he helped organize the first Grand Lodge of Ohio and became its first Grand Master in 1849. Stringer became a leader in the Prince Hall Freemasonry world and had a lodge in New Orleans, Louisiana named after him. When he moved to Mississippi, he brought Prince Hall Masonry to the state founding the first lodge in Vicksburg in 1867 and organized the Grand Lodge of Mississippi, where he was elected the first Grand Master, in 1875. Known as the "father of black Masonry in the South," he founded lodges in Louisiana, Mississippi, and Arkansas.

== Knights of Pythias of North America, South America, Europe, Asia, Africa and Australia ==
The Knights of Pythias formed in 1864 and barred Black members from becoming members. In 1880, Stringer, along with Thomas M. Broadwater, A. E. Lightfoot, George A. Place, W. D. Starks, Claybourne Julian, formed the Knights of Pythias of North America, South America, Europe, Asia, Africa and Australia in Vicksburg, Mississippi. It is unclear how these men got access to the rituals of the white organization with competing origin stories. One claim is that more light skinned African American men joined and then brought the rituals into their organization or that a white member of the Knights of Pythias gave the Black organization the rituals. The first lodge in Vicksburg was named Lightfoot Lodge, No. 1. The organization provide benefits to their members such as insurance, sick, and death benefits. In 1883, the Independent Order of Calanthe was created as the women's auxiliary order. The membership was originally opened to family members of the Knights but was later widened to any woman sponsored by a Knight.

== See also ==
- Buxton National Historic Site and Museum
