= Don S. S. Goodloe House =

Historic house in Maryland, United States

- U.S. National Register of Historic Places
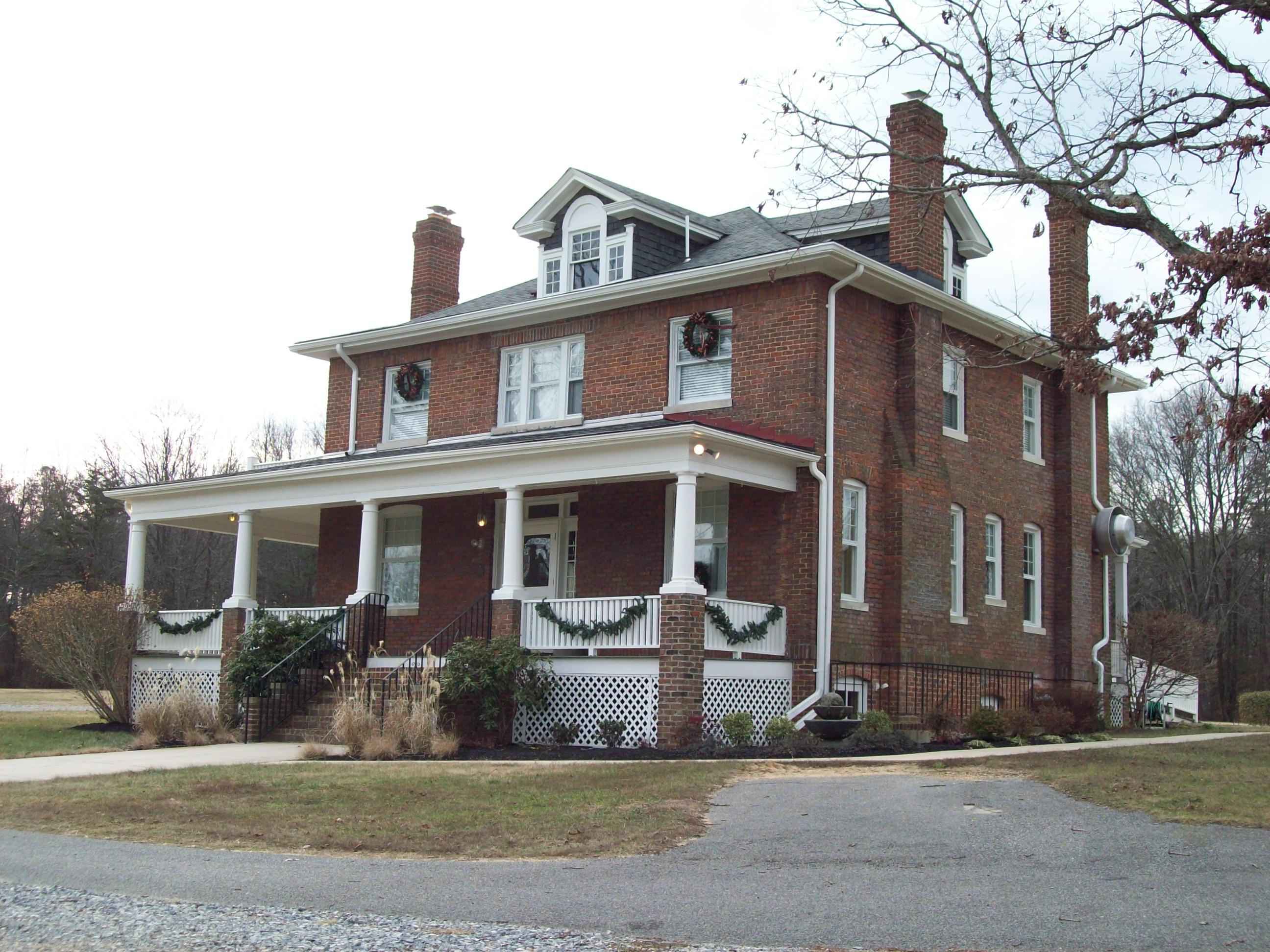
- Don S. S. Goodloe House, December 2008

- Location within Maryland Location within the United States
- Location: 13809 Laurel - Bowie Rd., Bowie, Maryland
- Coordinates: 39°1′4″N 76°46′2″W
- Area: 3 acres (1.2 ha)
- Built: 1915
- Built by: Moore, John A.
- Architectural style: Colonial Revival
- NRHP reference No.: 88001900
- Added to NRHP: October 13, 1988

The Don S. S. Goodloe House, a 1915–16 Colonial Revival style building veneered with brick, is significant for its association with Don Speed Smith Goodloe, the first principal of the Maryland Normal and Industrial School. The school, now Bowie State University, was Maryland's first postsecondary school for African Americans. As principal of the school from its opening in 1911 until 1921, Goodloe directed and managed this public institution through its formative years, a period characterized by the state's unwillingness to provide adequate funding for the housing and training of the students, while two white normal schools under the state were well funded.

Forced to provide his own housing, Goodloe had this large and commodious house built to accommodate not only his family, but also students for which he received additional income from the state. The house was designed by John A. Moore, an African American architect from Washington, D.C. Goodloe occupied the house until his death in 1959. It remained in the possession of Goodloe's heirs until 1990. The Goodloe house is the only building from the college's early period still standing. It is currently named the Goodloe Alumnihouse at Bowie State University.

It was listed on the National Register of Historic Places in 1988.
