= Samuel Starks House =

Historic house in West Virginia, United States

- U.S. National Register of Historic Places
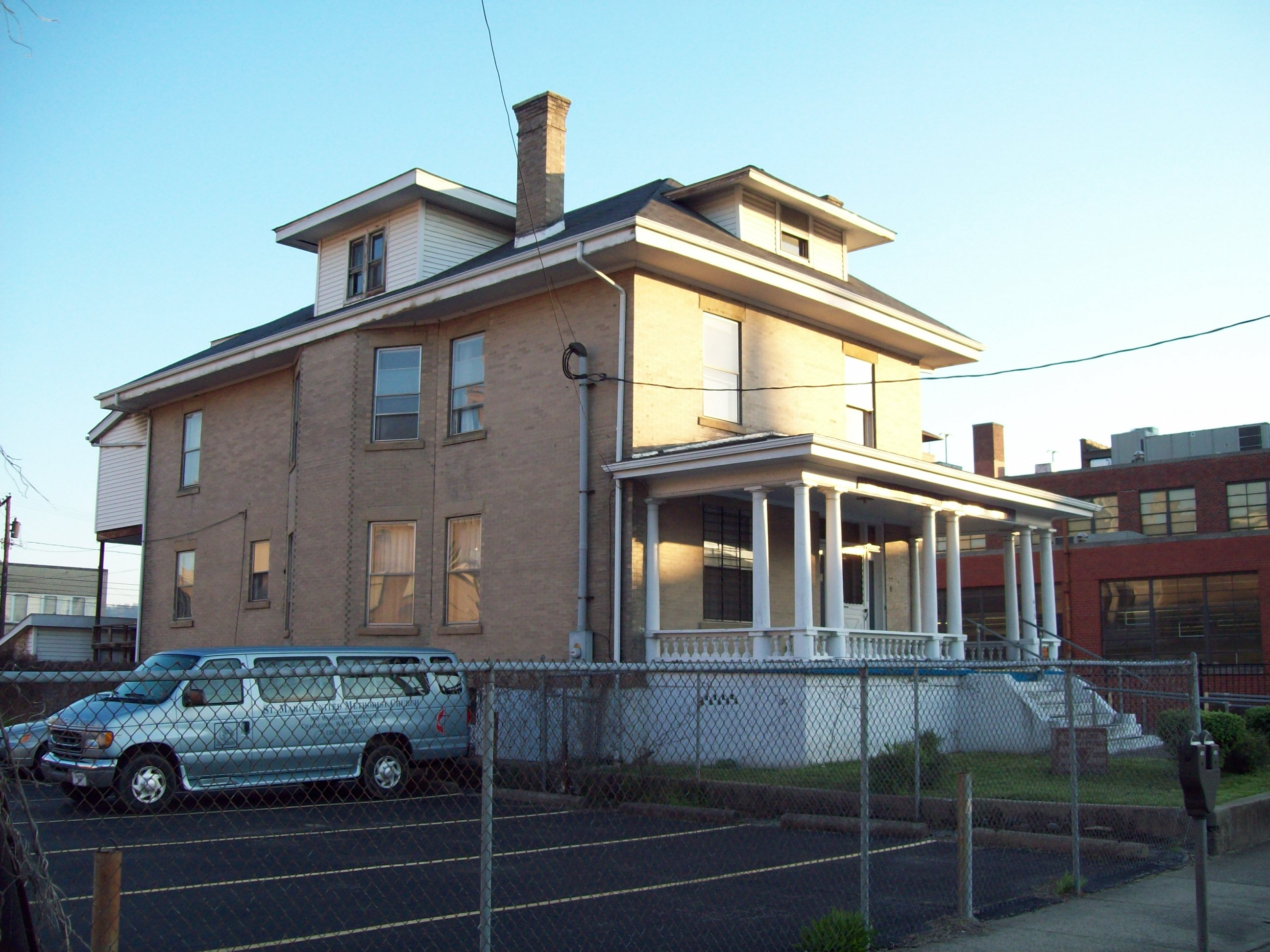
- Samuel Starks House, April 2009

- Location within West Virginia Location within the United States
- Location: 413 Shrewsbury St., Charleston, West Virginia
- Coordinates: 38°21′2″N 81°37′50″W
- Built: 1906
- Architectural style: American Foursquare
- NRHP reference No.: 87002526
- Added to NRHP: February 1, 1988

Samuel Starks House is a historic home located at Charleston, West Virginia.

It is an American Foursquare style home built in 1908, as home for Samuel W. Starks (1866–1908). Starks was a nationally prominent African American leader in the Knights of Pythias fraternal organization.

It was severely damaged by a fire in 1981 and subsequently repaired and renovated. The Samuel Starks House was listed on the National Register of Historic Places in 1988.

== See also ==
- List of Knights of Pythias buildings
- National Register of Historic Places listings in Kanawha County, West Virginia
