= Shallow Reign =

Shallow Reign is a band from Deep Ellum, the East of Dallas, Texas arts and entertainment district. The band was one of the first to become popular in the area from the mid-1980s to the early 1990s. Original Theater Gallery booking agent Jeff Liles described their sound as neopsychedelic. The songs revolved around layered guitar riffs with melancholy lyrics and a dynamic rhythm section.

The original line-up included Bob Watson, Mark Thomas, Jan Paul Davidsson and Patrick Sugg. The band was said to be pioneering and Sugg was referred to as a guitar whiz in a 1996 story in the Dallas Morning News.

The band continued after Sugg left and he eventually joined up with Ian Astbury and the Holy Barbarians.

== History ==
In May 1985 Shallow Reign played its first live performance at Theatre Gallery in Deep Ellum. Clay McNear of The Dallas Observer wrote:

Those who were at Theatre Gallery on May 30, 1985 laid witness to the birth of the Deep Ellum music scene ... how did this band come out of nowhere to set a standard as one of Dallas' finest acts ever, and to help conceive a local revolution that was long overdue.

They played a historical show on December 14, 1986. It was a benefit concert at Prophet Bar and the Theatre Gallery for a homeless shelter along with The New Bohemians and End Over End, among others.

Shallow Reign released its self-titled debut on July 4, 1986. The band was featured on Island Records The Sound Of Deep Ellum compilation record in 1987 with the song "Paint The Flowers All Black" and in Oliver Stone's movie "Born on the Fourth of July" performing Creedence Clearwater Revival's "Born On The Bayou". In 1989 Shallow Reign went on to release their second full-length album Strange World, and was then signed to a developmental deal with Interscope Records.

Shallow Reign played and recorded from May 1985 until 1991 before disbanding. The band toured both coasts and played in the southwest extensively over their six-year career at clubs including CBGB, the China Club and Cat Club in NYC, the Scream Club and Club Lingerie in LA, 930 Club in DC and the infamous Rathskeller in Boston.

After Shallow Reign disbanded in 1991, Bob Watson and Mark Thomas went on to form Medicine Show Caravan with two members from the Deep Ellum band The Trees. This new band played live and recorded from 1991 to 1994. After Medicine Show Caravan disbanded, Bob Watson has continued writing and recording with and without members of these two bands. Mark and Jan Paul live in Austin now and Bob resides in the East Texas area. Pat Sugg went on to form Neverland and recorded for Interscope Records after his departure in 1988. Pat lives in Los Angeles and continues to play guitar, write, record and lend his skills to a wide range of artists including Blue October.
