= Edward D. Green =

American politician (1865–1936)

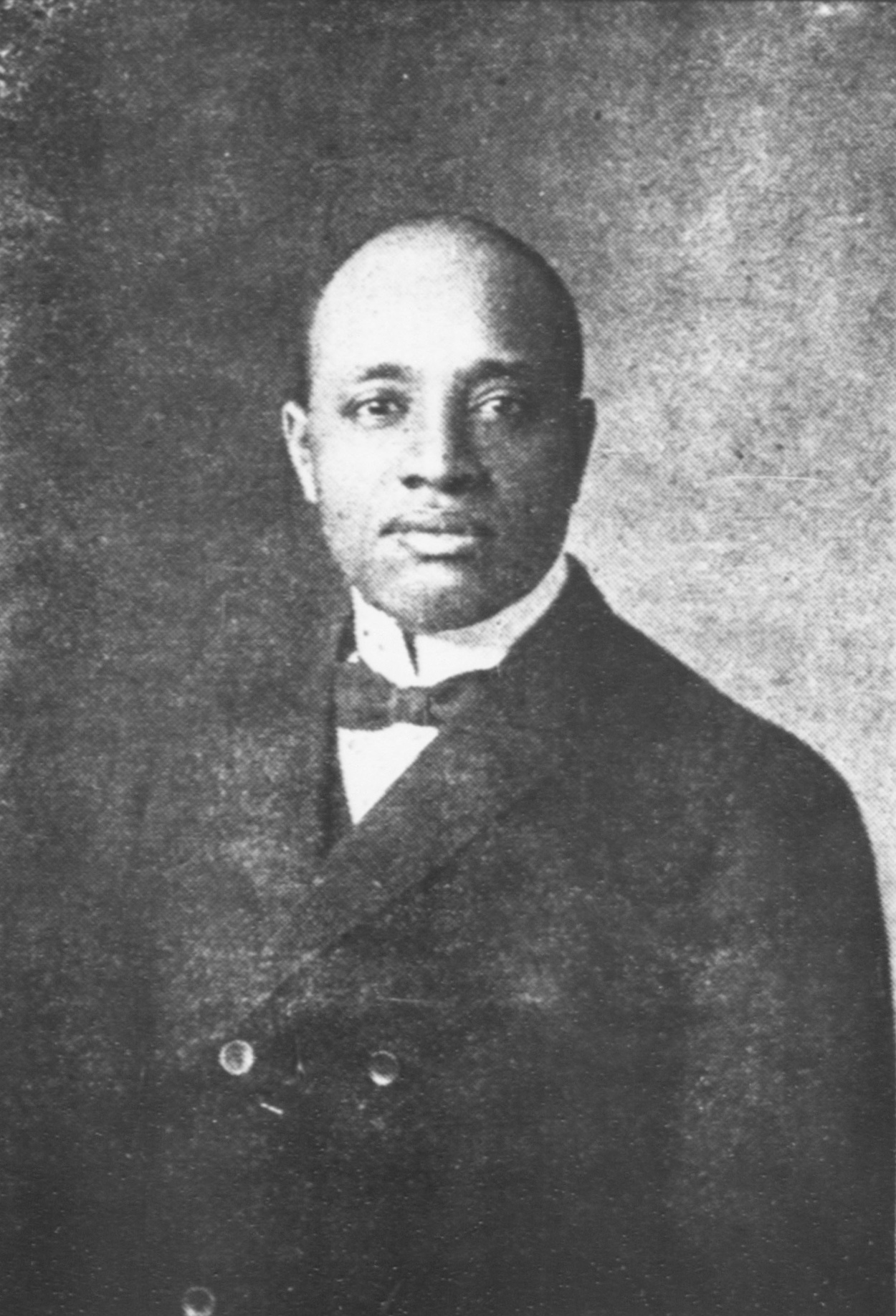

Member of the Illinois House of Representatives from the 1st district
- In office 1905–1907
- In office 1911–1913

Personal details
- Born: February 25, 1865 Pennsylvania, United States
- Died: August 23, 1936 (aged 71) Hot Springs, Arkansas, United States
- Party: Republican
- Occupation: Real estate broker

Edward D. Green (February 25, 1865 – August 23, 1936) was an American politician and businessman. He represented the 1st District, as a Republican in the Illinois House of Representatives from 1905 to 1907 and from 1911 to 1913. During his first term, he was the only African-American to serve in the House.

== Early life, education and career ==
Edward D. Green was born in Pennsylvania in 1865. His parents were Maudline and Jonathan Green. By 1867, the family was living in St. Louis, Missouri. He attended Sumner High School in St. Louis.

Green was a member of the Knights of Pythias of North America, South America, Europe, Asia, Africa and Australia. In 1904, he organized the national commercial department of the organization. He was also a Methodist and a member of the Appomattox Club.

In 1911, Green moved to Chicago and lived in the Bronzeville neighborhood.

== Politics and life ==
Upon arriving in Chicago in 1911, Green began working in the real estate business. He worked as a secretary at the Northern Assets Realization Company. As of 1915, Green was unmarried. He continued to be a member of the Knights of Pythias, serving as secretary for the national organization and secretary for the organization's Pythian Temple Sanitarium Commission.

=== Illinois House of Representatives ===
Green served two separate terms, 1905–07 and 1911–13, in the Illinois House of Representatives as a Republican. During his first term, he was the only African-American to serve in the House.

During his first term, he introduced a bill to ban the numbers game. He successfully introduced a bill that passed to stop discrimination in burial lot prices in cemeteries based on race. He also introduced successful anti-lynching and anti-mob bills.

He ran for Illinois State Senate Democratic nomination for the 3rd district in 1910. During his election, The Broad Ax, which endorsed Green, said he "stands in the estimation of the best Colored people in Chicago." He did not win the nomination.

He lost reelection in 1912, defeated by a white person. It became the first time a black person had not served in the Illinois State Legislature since 1880.

Green died on August 23, 1936, in Hot Springs, Arkansas, after being sick for a year. His body was sent back to Chicago and buried in the Lincoln Cemetery in Blue Island.
