= Allen Chapel AME Church (Fort Worth, Texas) =

Historic church in Texas, United States

- U.S. National Register of Historic Places
- Recorded Texas Historic Landmark
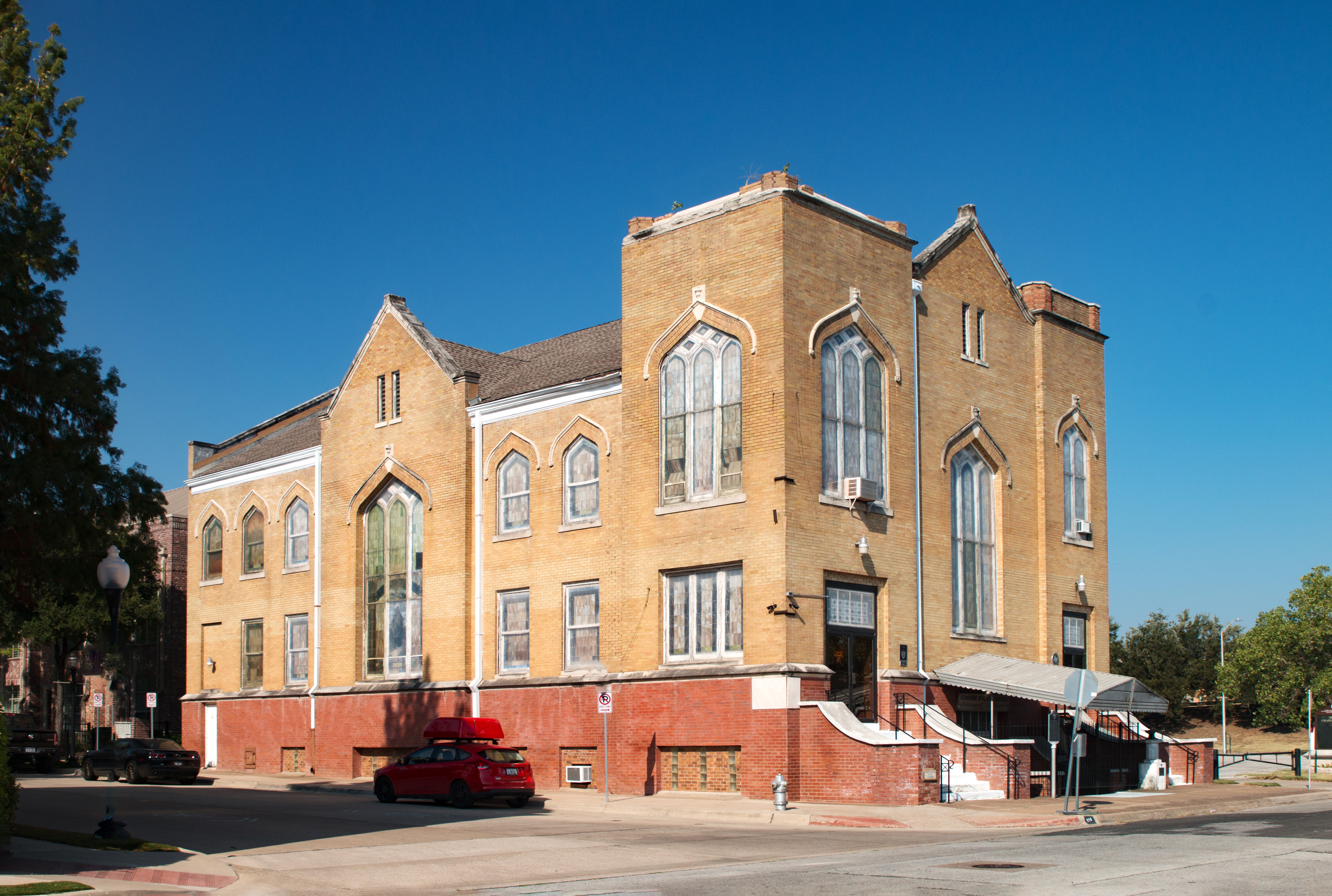

- Location within Texas Location within the United States
- Location: 116 Elm St., Fort Worth, Texas
- Coordinates: 32°45′32″N 97°19′38″W
- Area: less than one acre
- Built: 1914
- Architect: Pittman, William Sidney; Reed, William & Sons
- Architectural style: Late Gothic Revival, Other, Tudor Gothic
- Website: allenchapelfw.org
- NRHP reference No.: 84000169
- RTHL No.: 124

Significant dates
- Added to NRHP: October 18, 1984
- Designated RTHL: 1983

Allen Chapel AME Church is a historic church at the corner of First Street and Elm Street in Fort Worth, Texas. It was listed on the National Register of Historic Places in 1984.

== History ==
The Tudor Gothic Revival building was designed by noted African-American architect William Sidney Pittman, son-in-law of Booker T. Washington. When the church was completed in 1914, it sat 1,350 people. It was named after Richard Allen, a former slave and African-American minister who was the first bishop of the African-American Methodist Episcopal Church. Built at a cost of $20,000 it is the oldest and largest African Methodist Episcopal church in Fort Worth. The church established the first private schools for African-Americans. A pipe organ was installed in 1923. In 2011 lightning hit the church's bell tower causing extensive damage.

== Photo gallery ==
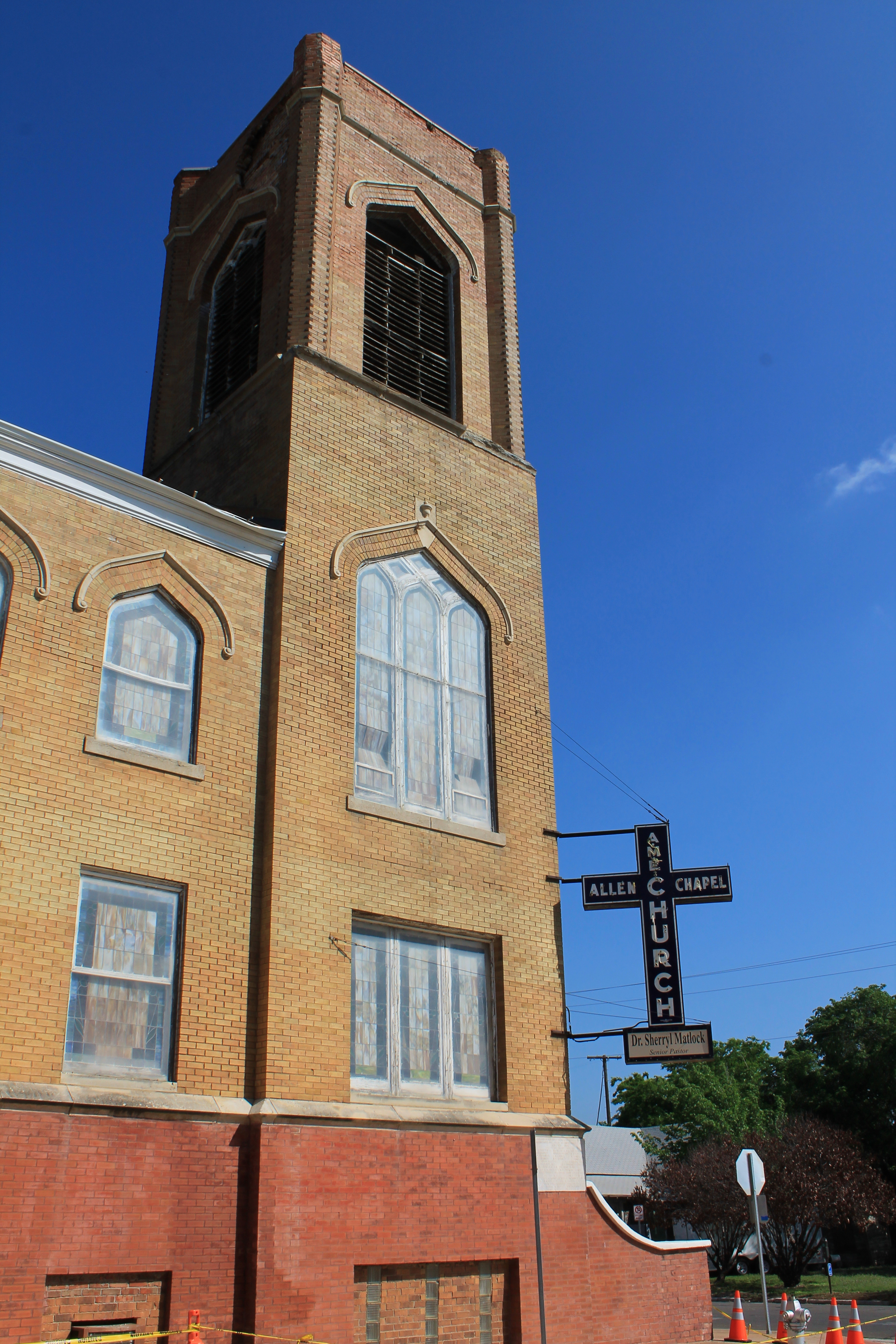

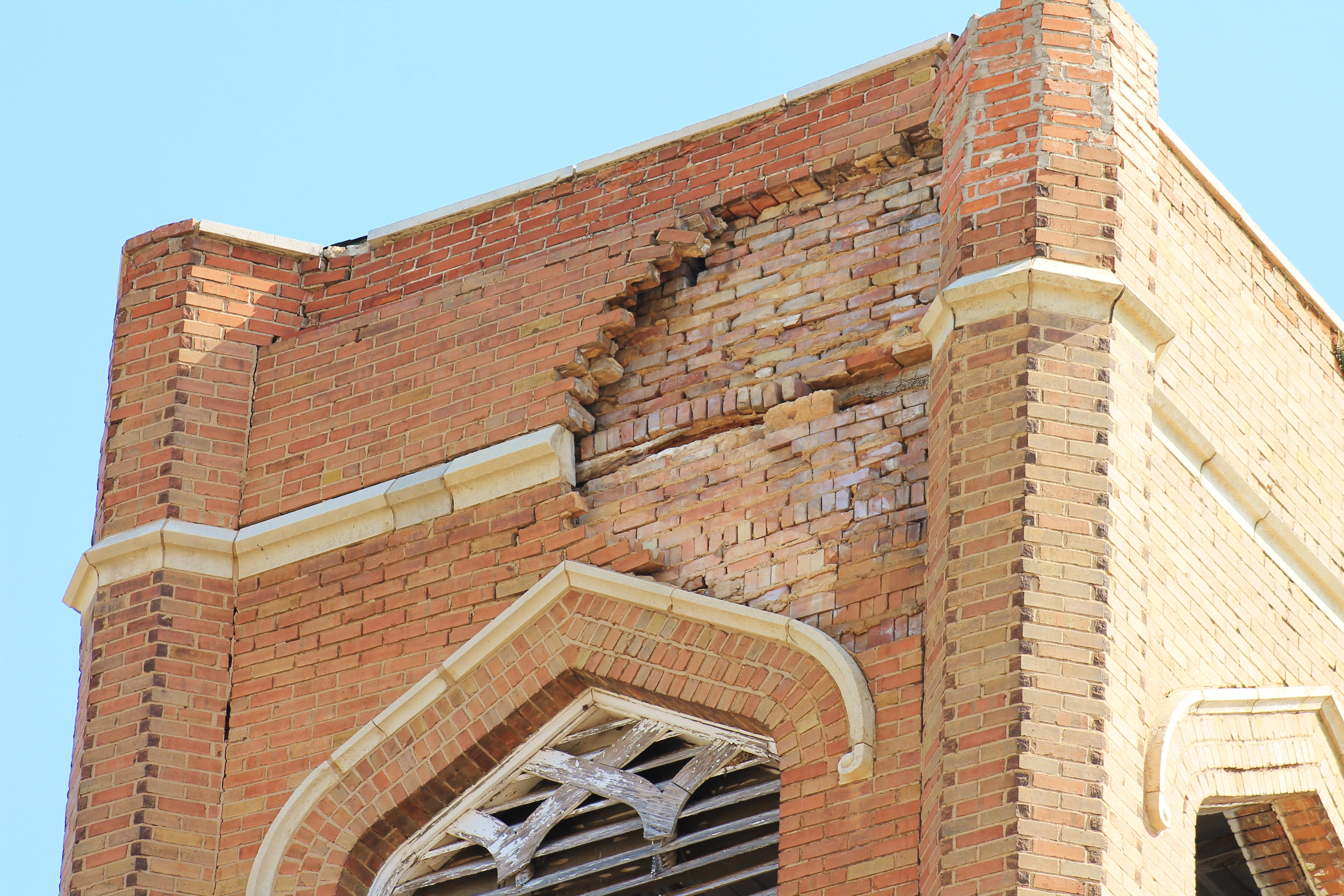

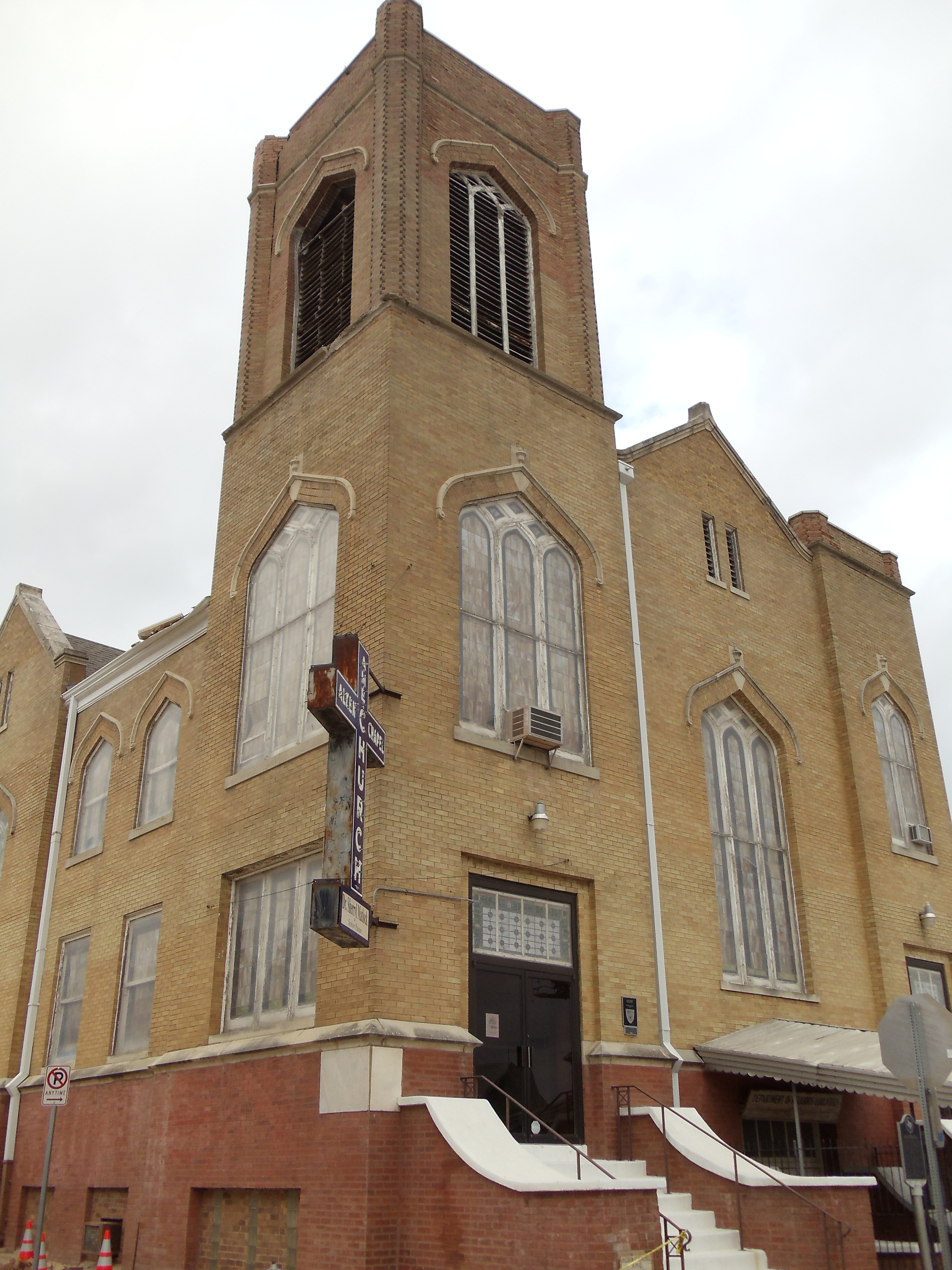

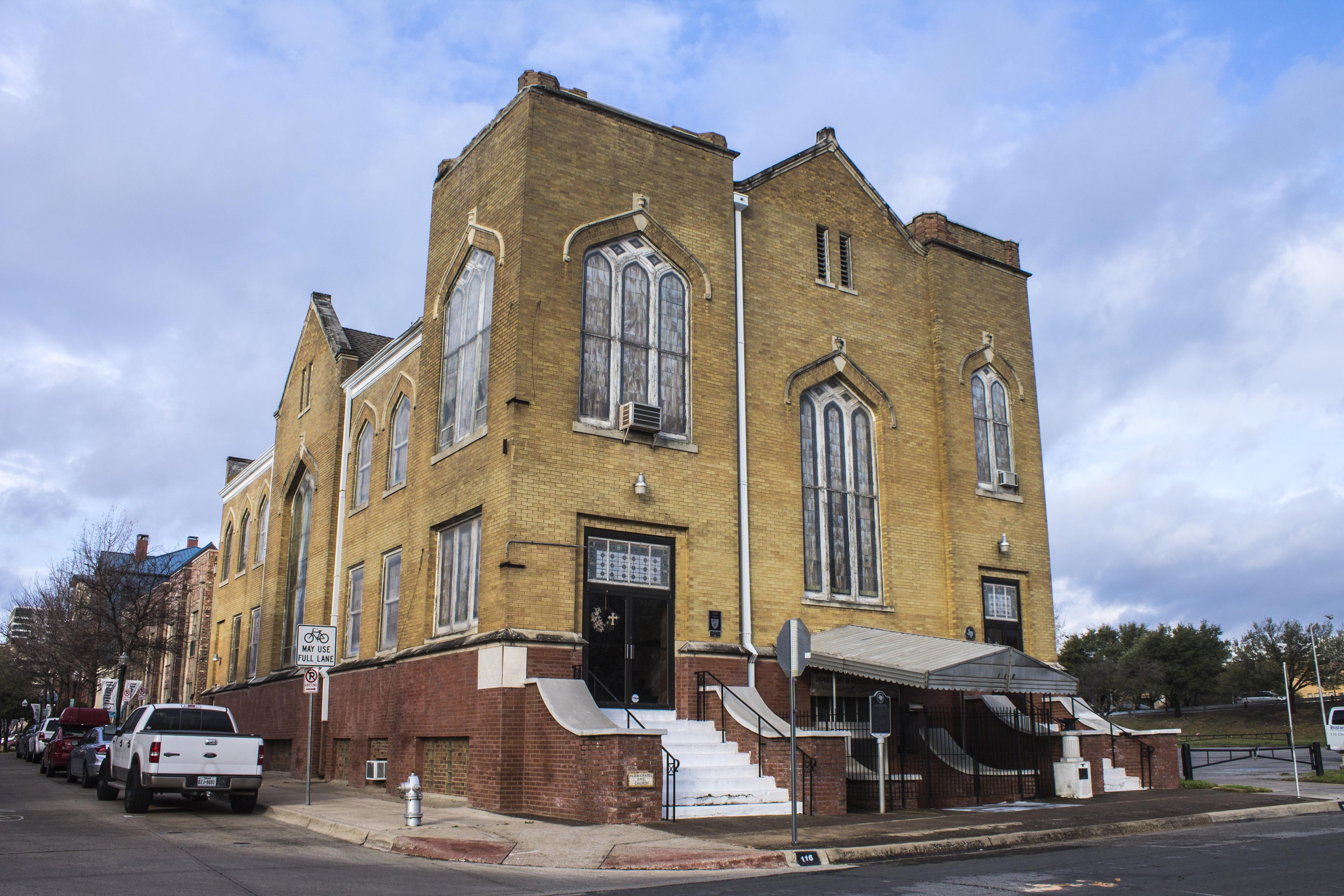

== See also ==
- National Register of Historic Places listings in Tarrant County, Texas
