= Don S.S. Goodloe =

- Born: June 2, 1878; Lowell, Kentucky, USA
- Died: September 2, 1959; Washington, D.C., USA
- Education: Berea College · Knoxville College · Allegheny College · Meadville Theological School
- Spouse: Fannie Carey
- Children: Don Burrowes Goodloe · Wallis Goodloe · Carey Goodloe ·
- Church: Unitarian Universalist

Rev. Don Speed Smith Goodloe (June 2, 1878 – September 2, 1959), born in the Lowell community, near Paint Lick, Kentucky, was a black teacher who became a pioneer for racial integration in the Unitarian church. He was the first principal of the Maryland Normal and Industrial School at Bowie for the Training of Colored Youth, also known as Maryland State Normal School No. 3—which later became Bowie State University.

== Biography ==
=== Education ===
Goodloe first attended the Grammar School and Academy of Berea College, a racially integrated school in Berea, Kentucky, from 1893 to 1898. He completed his sophomore year in the Academy [Berea (KY) College Archives]. Berea College was founded in 1855 by Presbyterian abolitionist John G. Fee, who made the school's motto "God had made of one blood all peoples of the earth", quoting Biblical scripture. Berea claims to have been the only racially integrated college in the South until 1904, when Kentucky passed the Day Law, requiring all its schools to be segregated.

From 1898 to 1899, Goodloe attended a segregated normal school for the training of black teachers–Knoxville College in Knoxville, Tennessee, which was founded by the United Presbyterian Church. Here he met his future wife, Fannie Carey of Knoxville. They were married in Knoxville on June 9, 1899, after Fannie graduated from the college. Knoxville College offered classics, science, theology, agriculture, industrial arts, and medicine, as well as industrial training on the model of Hampton Institute, Booker T. Washington's Tuskegee Institute, and later, Bowie Normal School. Students at Knoxville cut timber, made bricks, and helped construct most buildings on campus.

=== Early career ===
Goodloe began his career as principal of a black public school at Newport, Tennessee fifty miles east of Knoxville. He held the post from 1899 to 1900. The Goodloes' first son, Don Burrowes, was born in Newport. (Note: Lists of American citizens traveling on S.S. Statendam and S.S. Columbus in 1939 give Don Burrowes's birthplace as Newport. The document is in the Goodloe Archives at Goodloe Memorial Unitarian Universalist Congregation in Bowie, Maryland.)

In 1900, the Goodloes moved to Greenville, Tennessee, near [Nashville], where Goodloe was a teacher and principal at Greenville College, a black normal school. Goodloe served there from 1900 to 1901. The next year they moved back to Lowell, where Goodloe taught from 1901 to 1903. Fannie gave birth to a second son, Wallis, in Lowell.

=== Meadville ===
The Goodloes moved to Meadville, Pennsylvania in 1904, so that Goodloe to complete his Bachelor of Arts degree at Allegheny College. He was also attracted to the Unitarian seminary there, Meadville Theological School. In Meadville, with two boys—and Fannie pregnant with their third child, Carey—Goodloe was quick to find work to help support them. He then enrolled at both Allegheny College and Meadville Theological School.

Goodloe was the fifth black to attend Meadville, and the first to graduate from the school. Others followed, and Goodloe can be said to have integrated the school. Although he did not face the angry resistance of George Wallace standing in the schoolhouse doorway, he likely encountered racial prejudice from some students and faculty. Unitarian Universalist minister Reverend Mark Morrison-Reed discussed this period of Goodloe's life in his book "Black Pioneers in a White Denomination."

In a 1903 letter, Meadville president Franklin Southworth states that Goodloe was a "residing elder in the Methodist Episcopal Church", and that although

the way was open for him at two or three orthodox institutions in the South and the money would have been provided... he could not bring himself to accept the doctrinal limitations, so he applied to us. I endeavored before advising him to come here simply to find out what his ambition was, and it seemed to me that to satisfy that ambition it was necessary for him to choose a school like ours rather than a sectarian school.

— Franklin Southworth, President, Meadville Theological School

Goodloe came to Meadville even though he knew it was unlikely he would be ordained by a Unitarian church, because none would accept a black minister. President Southworth wrote, "I find this morning in putting the possibilities squarely before him that he has come here with his eyes open, knowing that it is probably not a good way into the orthodox ministry, but ready to take the consequences."

Southworth continued, "What the negroes need in...[Goodloe's] judgement more than emotionalism in religion and more even than industrialism in education, is moral teaching and preaching." Goodloe proposed, said Southworth, "with the help of his wife, to start a small school composed of carefully selected and choice students, and to run the school along with his Sunday preaching."

=== Danville, KY ===
After graduating from both Allegheny College and Meadville Theological School in 1906, Goodloe resumed his career as a teacher at Danville Industrial Normal School and as a businessman in Danville—which was just twenty miles west of his family home in Lowell—from 1906 until 1910.

In 1910, the Goodloes left Danville, and Goodloe became vice-principal for a year at the Manassas Industrial School in Manassas, Virginia.

=== Maryland State Normal School No. 3 ===
Later in 1910, Goodloe responded to the opportunity to build a new school near Baltimore and Washington, D.C., the Maryland Normal and Industrial School at Bowie for the Training of Colored Youth, also known as Maryland State Normal School No. 3.

When the Goodloes arrived at the school, it had a farmhouse, barn, chicken house, and a new brick building, the new building having been constructed by the State of Maryland. The state had just taken over the funding of the Normal School and moved it from Baltimore to Bowie. The Goodloes lived in the brick building with the female students. Male students were housed in the loft of the barn, previously used for horses and cows.

The Maryland Legislature was controlled by farmers in rural counties who were short on labor and feared that education would draw blacks away from the farm. The school's 1911–1912 catalog emphasized the importance of teaching skills to black students–carpentry, painting, blacksmithing, plastering, papering, and shoemaking for the men, and domestic science, sewing and millinery work for the women. The school also aimed to prepare black teachers. The academic curriculum was equal to the ordinary high school course, with English, arithmetic, algebra, history, geography, music, government, physics, botany, and Latin or German. There were six teachers; Mrs. Goodloe taught music.

In 1911, the school enrolled 58 students: 23 preparatory, 22 first-year, 6 second-year, and 7 third-year. Incoming students had to be at least 15 years old and to have completed "six grades in the best public schools of that state." Thus, for most of Goodloe's tenure, the school was the only place in the state for black students to receive an education past the sixth-grade level. The first black high school in the state was started in Cambridge in 1917, followed by one in Baltimore, and then Annapolis. During the first year, the black elementary school at the corner of 11th Street and Normal School Road, just east of the old town of Bowie, was placed under the direction of the Normal School, thus giving teachers-in-training a model school for practice with 86 students.

In 1914, the school's name was changed to the Maryland Normal and Industrial School at Bowie.

The Goodloes decided to build a house for themselves in 1915. They hired John A. Moore, a black architect from Washington, D.C., to design the home, and black workers built the home. Lumber for the framing was cut, and bricks for the veneer were made, on the property. It was completed in 1916. In 1988, the Don S. S. Goodloe House was listed in the National Register of Historic Places. The house, built on the school grounds, is now the Goodloe Alumni House of Bowie State University.

In 1917, household chemistry, farm physics, and practice school work were introduced at the school. The terms "household" and "farm" may have been added to satisfy the farmers who controlled politics in Annapolis, while still allowing chemistry and physics to be taught.

In the fall of 1918, student enrollment declined sharply to 36 students as a result of World War I, the international outbreak of influenza, and the high cost of living. In 1919, it bounced back up to 69 students, and the faculty was increased from 7 to 10. Goodloe established the first summer session for the school in 1920.

In 1920, the secretary of the Maryland State Colored Teachers' Association sent Goodloe a letter of commendation "for the constant and progressive fight he has made toward enriching of the curriculum and the uplifting of the standards of the Bowie State Normal School."

During his tenure in Bowie, from 1911 until 1921, Goodloe established a faculty of ten members, an enrollment of 80 students, completion of the seventh grade as an admission requirement, a model school for student teachers at Horsepen Hill School–the first school for black children in Bowie, a summer session, a new dormitory for women, and renovation of living quarters for men. One additional year was added to the course, which led to a second-grade certificate and the opportunity for students to perform two years of additional work to earn a first-grade certificate. He made many pleas for additional funding before the legislature in Annapolis, which might have brought more rapid development to the school, but the state seemed to favor the white normal schools in Towson and Frostburg in its appropriations.

In 1921, at the age of 43, Goodloe resigned his post at Bowie. Goodloe told a friend of his in Washington that he resigned because he was just tired of being principal.

Goodloe's liberal religion may have been a cause of conflict at the school. His successor as Principal, Dr. Leonidas S. James, according to his daughter, considered it "very important to be guided by sound philosophy in an environment that was sprinkled with many Christian liberals." His daughter may have been referring to Goodloe.

=== Baltimore ===
After leaving the school, Goodloe moved to Baltimore, where a directory of black businesses listed him as President of Standard Benefit Society in 1923-24. Other records show him owning rental housing in Baltimore. Later he moved to Washington, and is said to have owned extensive property in the District. In 1924, he testified in Congress on behalf of a bill creating an inter-racial commission. Fannie and two of their sons, Wallis and Donald B., continued to live in the two-story house on Jericho Park Road. Both sons graduated from Howard University, became teachers in Baltimore, and later in Washington. Donald B. Goodloe taught at Dunbar High School.

In 1949, at the age of 71, Goodloe divorced Fannie and remarried.

He died in Washington, D.C. in 1959.

An article in the Danville (Kentucky) Advocate-Messenger, Sunday, March 10, 2013, page C-7, profiles his life.

== Philosophical views ==
According to his son Wallis, Goodloe was a persuasive speaker. His writing skills are demonstrated in his school catalogs and reports. The 1911–1912 Maryland State Normal School No. 3 catalog states,

While the school is like all State Institutions, strictly undenominational and unsectarian, the atmosphere is Christian... and every effort is bent towards influencing and molding their characters to the end that the highest ideals of service to race and country may obtain.

— D.S.S. Goodloe, Principal.

The 1911/12 school catalog also espouses a philosophy in harmony with that of Booker T. Washington. Goodloe states that "now and perhaps for many years to come, agricultural and industrial training are plainly indicated for the Negro by the situation itself...[It is important to teach] the negro boy and girl to love and live successfully the agricultural life..."

== Honors ==
In 1915, Goodloe was honored by inclusion in Who's Who of the Colored Race, which listed essential bibliographical information, including his membership in the Knights of Pythias of North America, South America, Europe, Asia, Africa and Australia, a secular fraternal order. (Note: This membership would have been in the African-American Knights of Pythias. Like most fraternal orders, the Pythians admitted no blacks. This led blacks to establish the African-American Knights of Pythias and parallel versions of other orders (e.g., Masons and Odd Fellows). In 1906, when the white fraternal orders attempted to force the black counterparts out of existence, the black Pythians, 300,000 strong nationally, raised money, sued the white Pythians, and litigated all the way to the U.S. Supreme Court, which in 1912 ruled in their favor, agreeing that too much time had passed (40 years?) for the white order to retain exclusive use of its name and ritual. The case was the forerunner of NAACP lawsuits using the Supreme Court to overrule state courts, including Brown vs. Board of Education.) Pythians promoted friendship, universal peace, kindness, and tolerance, and had rituals based on Greek philosophy circa 400 B.C.

In 1916, Goodloe was included in Who's Who in America.

In 2005, the Unitarian Universalist congregation located in Bowie, Maryland changed its name from the Bowie Unitarian Universalist Fellowship to the Goodloe Memorial Unitarian Universalist Congregation, in honor of Goodloe.
