= William Sidney Pittman =

American architect

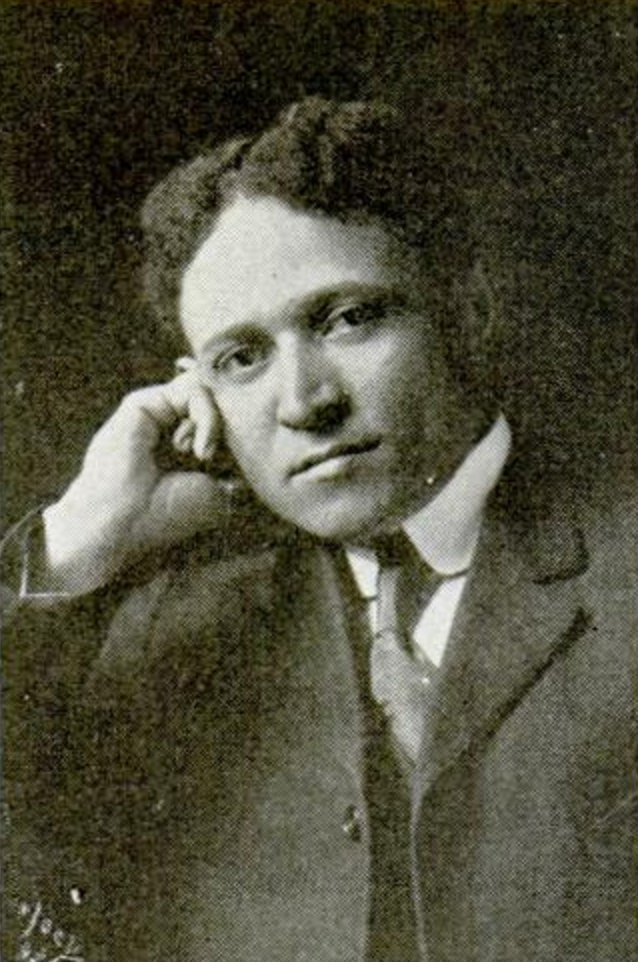
- W. Sidney Pittman, ca 1916
- Born: April 21, 1875; Montgomery, Alabama
- Died: 14 March 1958 (aged 82); Dallas, Texas
- Occupation: Architect
- Spouse: Portia Washington Pittman (married 1907 - 1928)

William Sidney Pittman (April 21, 1875 – March 14, 1958) was an American architect who designed several notable buildings, such as the Zion Baptist Church and the nearby Deanwood Chess House in the Deanwood neighborhood of Washington, D.C. He was the son-in-law of Booker T. Washington.

== Biography ==
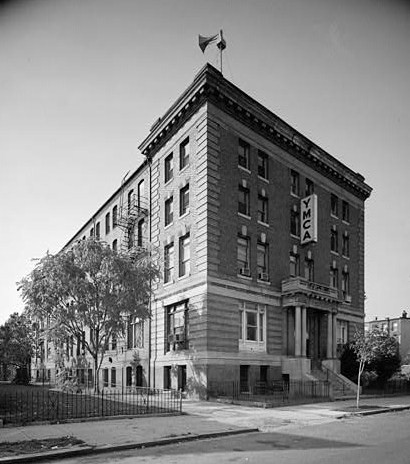
Twelfth Street YMCA Building, 1816 Twelfth Street Northwest (Washington, District of Columbia)

Pittman was born April 21, 1875, in Montgomery, Alabama to an ex-slave laundress and a prominent white man of the city. At the age of 17 Pittman attended Tuskegee Institute, where he completed programs in woodwork and architectural-mechanical drawing in 1897. He was awarded a scholarship to attend the all-white Drexel Institute in Philadelphia, where he completed the five-year architecture and mechanical drawing program in only three years, graduating in 1900, after which he returned to Tuskegee to teach for the next five years.

Pittman designed buildings for the Tuskegee Institute, including Collis P. Huntington Memorial Building (1900–05). He then moved to Washington, D.C., and developed his own successful architectural practice, receiving many important commissions. He developed the Fairmount Heights housing development for blacks in the suburbs of Maryland. In 1907, he married Portia Washington, daughter of Booker T. Washington, and the family home that Pittman designed in Fairmount Heights is a notable landmark. Pittman won a federal commission for the Negro Building at the Tercentennial Exposition at Jamestown, Virginia in 1907. He designed the Colored Carnegie Library of Houston, built in 1913 as the only library available to African Americans of that city.

Pittman moved to Texas in 1913 to escape the influence of his famous father-in-law. Once in Texas, Pittman built the Pythian Temple (1915–16) and the St. James African Methodist Episcopal Church (1920) in Dallas, the Allen Chapel A.M.E. Church in Fort Worth (1914); the Joshua Chapel A.M.E. Church in (Waxahachie 1917) and the Wesley Chapel A.M.E. in Houston (1926).

In 1928, after raising three children, Pittman and his wife (Portia Washington Pittman), daughter of well known black intellect Booker T Washington, separated. She returned to teach in Tuskegee. He quit the practice of architecture, working as a skilled carpenter. For most of the next two decades, he published an opinionated and controversial weekly paper titled The Brotherhood Eyes, a dissident voice in the African-American community that was an alternative to mainstream newspapers such as the Dallas Weekly or the Dallas Express. In the paper, he attacked what he saw as failures among the local preachers and other black leaders, gaining himself many enemies.

Pittman died March 14, 1958, in Dallas, where he is buried in Glen Oaks Cemetery.

== Works ==
- Pythian Temple in Dallas Texas
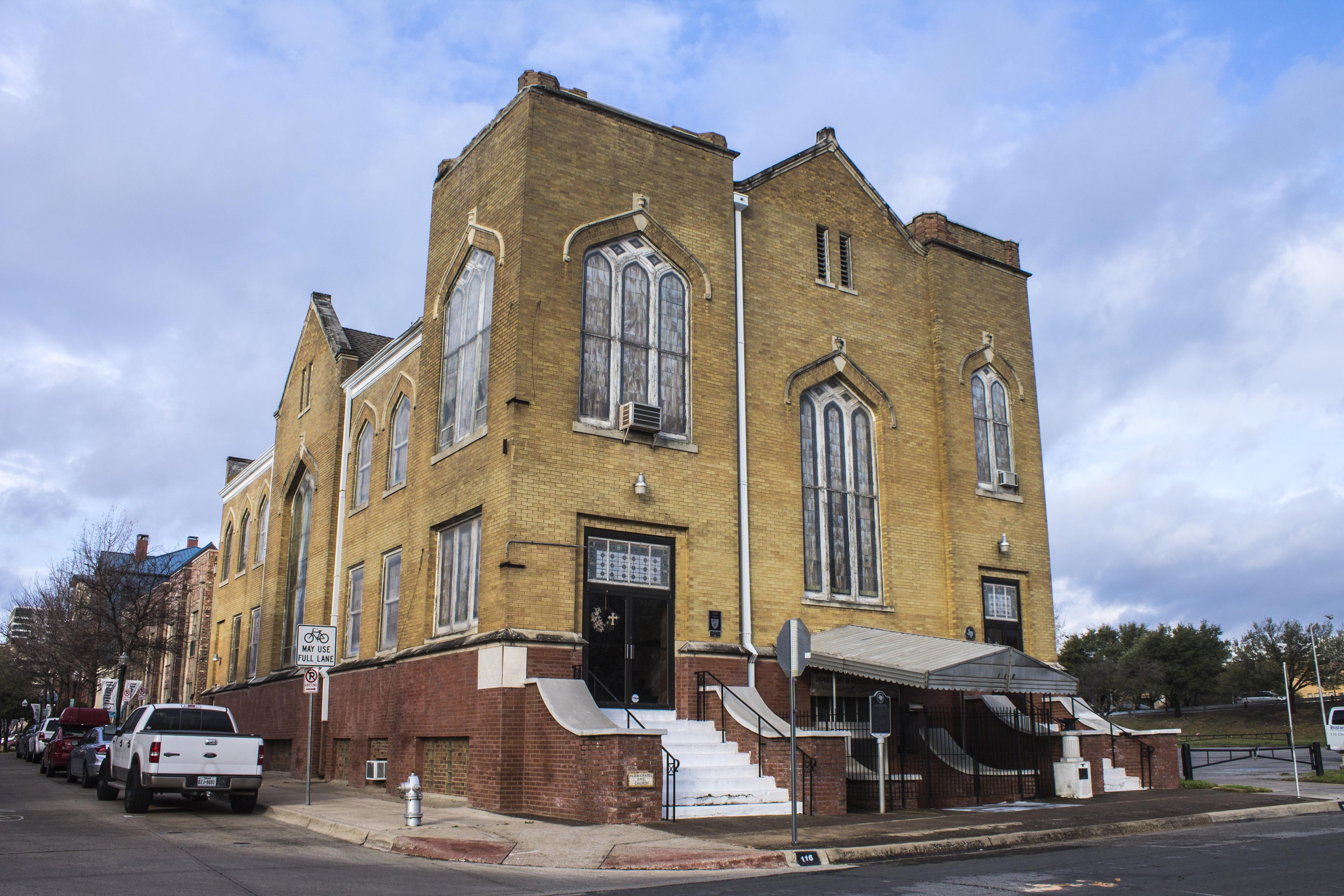
Allen Chapel AME Church, Fort Worth

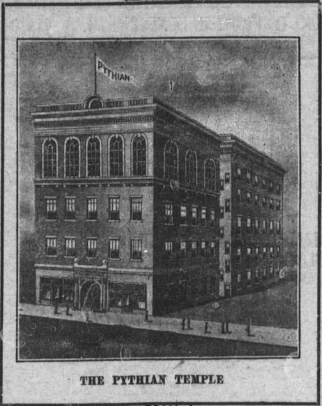
Knights of Pythias Temple, Elm Street, Dallas, Texas

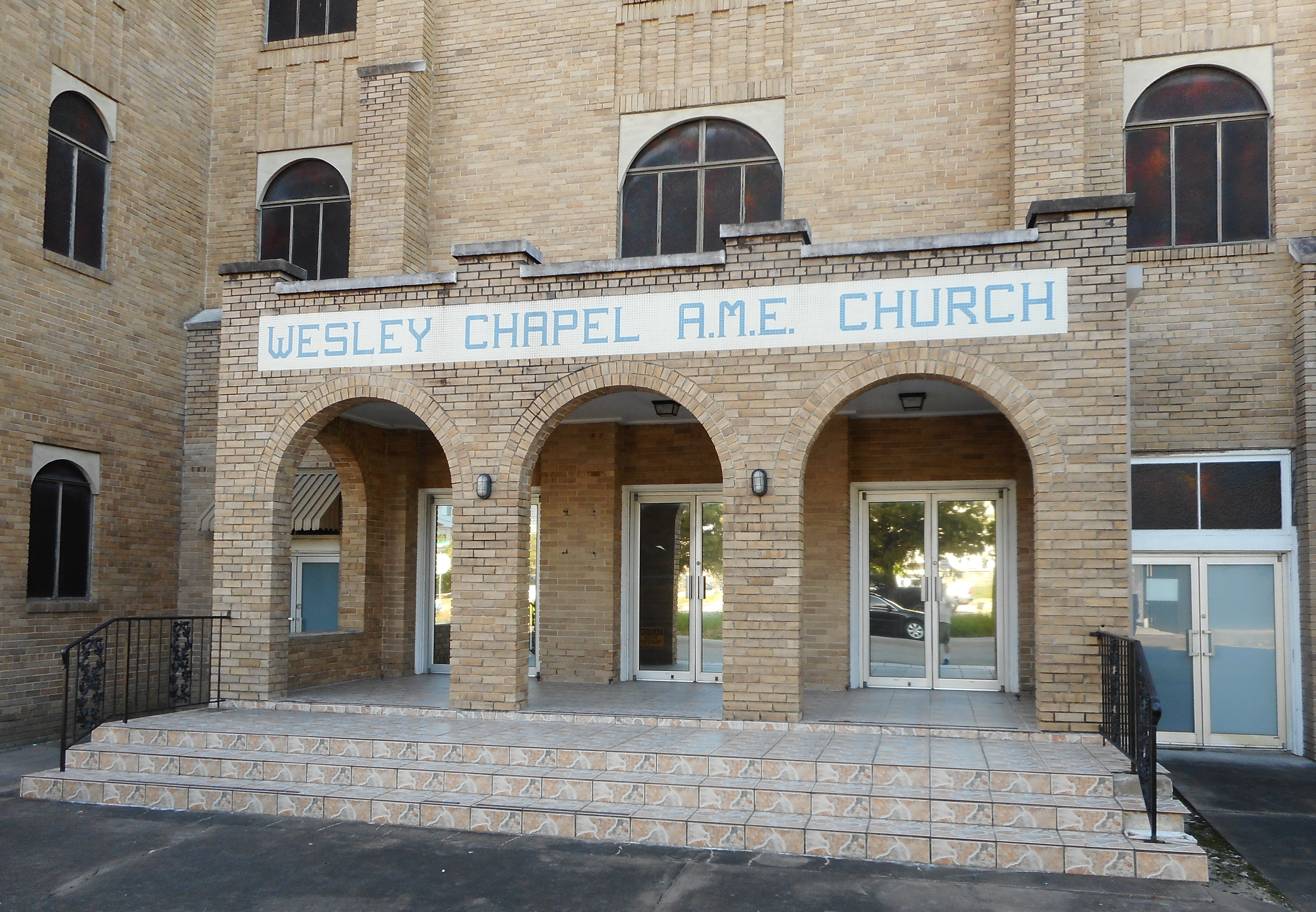
Portico of the Wesley Chapel AME Church in Houston
