= Henry Alvin Cameron =

American educator and World War I casualty

Henry Alvin Cameron

Henry Alvin Cameron (February 4, 1872 – October 30, 1918) was an American schoolteacher who served as an officer in the United States Army during World War I. Prior to joining the military at age 45, he worked as a science teacher and coach at Pearl High School in Nashville, Tennessee, and was an advocate for education. During the war he served in France and was killed in the Battle of the Argonne Forest.

== Early life ==
Cameron was born in Nashville, Tennessee on February 4, 1872, to Walter and Jane Bentley Cameron. His true date of birth in February 1872 has been established from census records taken at various stages of his life and a biographical sketch of himself that Professor Cameron wrote for an encyclopedia of outstanding black Americans published in 1915.

== Education and career ==
Cameron graduated in 1892 from Meigs High School in East Nashville - the first black public high school in the city of Nashville. In 1896, he was awarded a Bachelor of Arts degree from Fisk University and joined the faculty at Pearl High School in Nashville a year later as a science teacher. In 1898, Cameron received his Bachelor of Laws degree from Central Tennessee College, a post-secondary school for blacks located at the current site of Cameron School. He married his long-time high school sweetheart, Louise S. Brien, on June 5, 1899.

Cameron was an avid sports enthusiast who became the first basketball and baseball coach at Pearl High in Nashville. He also served in a multitude of other roles in the community: President of the Middle Tennessee Teacher's Association, Secretary of the Tennessee Aid Association, Member of the Nashville Teacher's Literary and Benefit Association, Republican, of Prince Hall Freemasonry and 32nd degree Scottish Rite mason, Fraternal Member of the Knights of Pythias of North America, South America, Europe, Asia, Africa and Australia and the Grand Lodge of Tennessee and President of the Capital City Baseball League, a local baseball franchise consisting of eight teams based in the Nashville area.

== Military service ==
In April 1917, with a terrible war going on in Europe, the United States decided to enter this conflict against the Germans. Cameron, at the age of 45, took a leave of absence from teaching at Pearl in June 1917 to participate in the war effort. On October 15, 1917, he was commissioned as a first lieutenant in the U.S. Army at Fort Des Moines, Iowa, a facility established especially for training black officers in World War I.

On June 10, 1918, he sailed for France and was assigned to Company M, 365th Infantry Regiment, 92nd Division – one of three black infantry divisions in combat during the war. For reasons not stated in the records, the U.S. Army reversed Cameron's first and middle names and he was listed in his service records as Alvin H. Cameron instead of Henry A. Cameron. As an officer, he was concerned with the safety and well-being of the men under his command. They succeeded in winning many battles against the German army in the face of challenging conditions which unfortunately included discrimination received from his own U.S. Army superiors.

On October 30, 1918, during the Battle of the Argonne Forest in France - one of the bloodiest battles of the war - Cameron was killed in action while on a scout patrol with his unit. He was the first of only three black men appointed officers in World War I from Tennessee and the first black officer to die from Tennessee. Cameron's body was not brought back to Nashville. His remains are still located in France at the St. Mihiel American Cemetery in Thiaucourt, France.

== Honors and awards ==
Posthumous medals conferred upon Cameron for his actions during World War I include: the Croix de Guerre (awarded by the French); the Meuse-Argonne with St. Die defensive clasps; the World War I Victory Medal with battle clasps and the Purple Heart.

Nevertheless, a year later in 1919, with the introduction of American Legion posts all over the U.S., the Henry A. Cameron Post 6 in Nashville, Tennessee was established in his honor. It was one of the first American Legion posts named after an African American and is still in operation today. Additionally, on November 26, 1928, in a show of honor and respect for Cameron, the Nashville City School Board named Cameron School in his honor. A large-scale photo of Cameron now hangs in the lobby of Cameron School.
