= Exposition Park, Dallas =

Neighborhood of Dallas, Texas

Coordinates: 32.782°N 96.767°W

Exposition Park (or Expo Park) is a neighborhood in south Dallas, Texas. Centered along tree-lined Exposition Avenue, the small enclave stretches from the eastern edge of Deep Ellum to the entrance of Fair Park. The area includes Exposition Plaza, a one-acre special use park established in 1984 that features an amphitheater and sculpture areas.

Exposition Park is home to several eclectic bars and restaurants, with small businesses and entertainment venues dotting the street-level storefronts. The neighborhood is also widely known as a budding arts district, attracting many artists and creatives who live and work in the area. Several art galleries, artist and photography studios, and creative offices are located within its borders.

August Real Estate Co., a major property owner in the area, has preserved many of the historic buildings and lofts across the neighborhood.

== Historic Buildings ==
- Goodyear Tire & Rubber Company Building, 3809 Parry Avenue, Dallas, TX 75206
- B.F. Goodrich Building, 4136-40 Commerce Street, Dallas, TX 75206
- Texas Centennial Exposition Buildings, located inside Fair Park, Dallas, TX
- Dallas Fire Department Hook and Ladder Company No. 3, 3801 Parry Avenue, Dallas, TX 75206

== Attractions ==
- Dallas Fair Park
- Dallas Firefighter's Museum
- Exposition Plaza

== Businesses ==
=== Art Galleries ===
- Maestri Gallery
- The Power Station
- Olivier François Galerie

=== Art and Photography Studios ===
- Addison Sloane Artworks
- Beau Bumpass Photography
- CentralTrak (closed 2017)
- Center for Art Conservation

=== Bars and Restaurants ===
- Craft and Growler
- The Double Wide Bar
- Eight Bells Alehouse
- Las Almas Rotas
- Noble Coyote Coffee Roasters
- Whiskeys

=== Fitness and Wellness ===
- East Side Athletic Club
- Ruby Room Studio

=== Hair Salons and Barbershops ===
- Dallas Hair Company
- Rob's Chop Shop

=== Performance Venues ===
- Rainbow Vomit
- Sandaga 813
- The Ochre House Theater

== Education ==
Public schools The Dallas Independent School District assigned the neighborhood to the following schools:

- Elementary School (Grades PK - 5): PAUL L. DUNBAR*
- Middle School (Grades 6 - 8): BILLY EARL DADE*
- High School (Grades 9 - 12): JAMES MADISON*

== Transportation ==
=== Trains ===
==== Light Rail ====
- DART: Green Line
  - Fair Park Station
  - Google Street View (map)

=== Highways ===
- Interstate 30
