= Holly (name) =

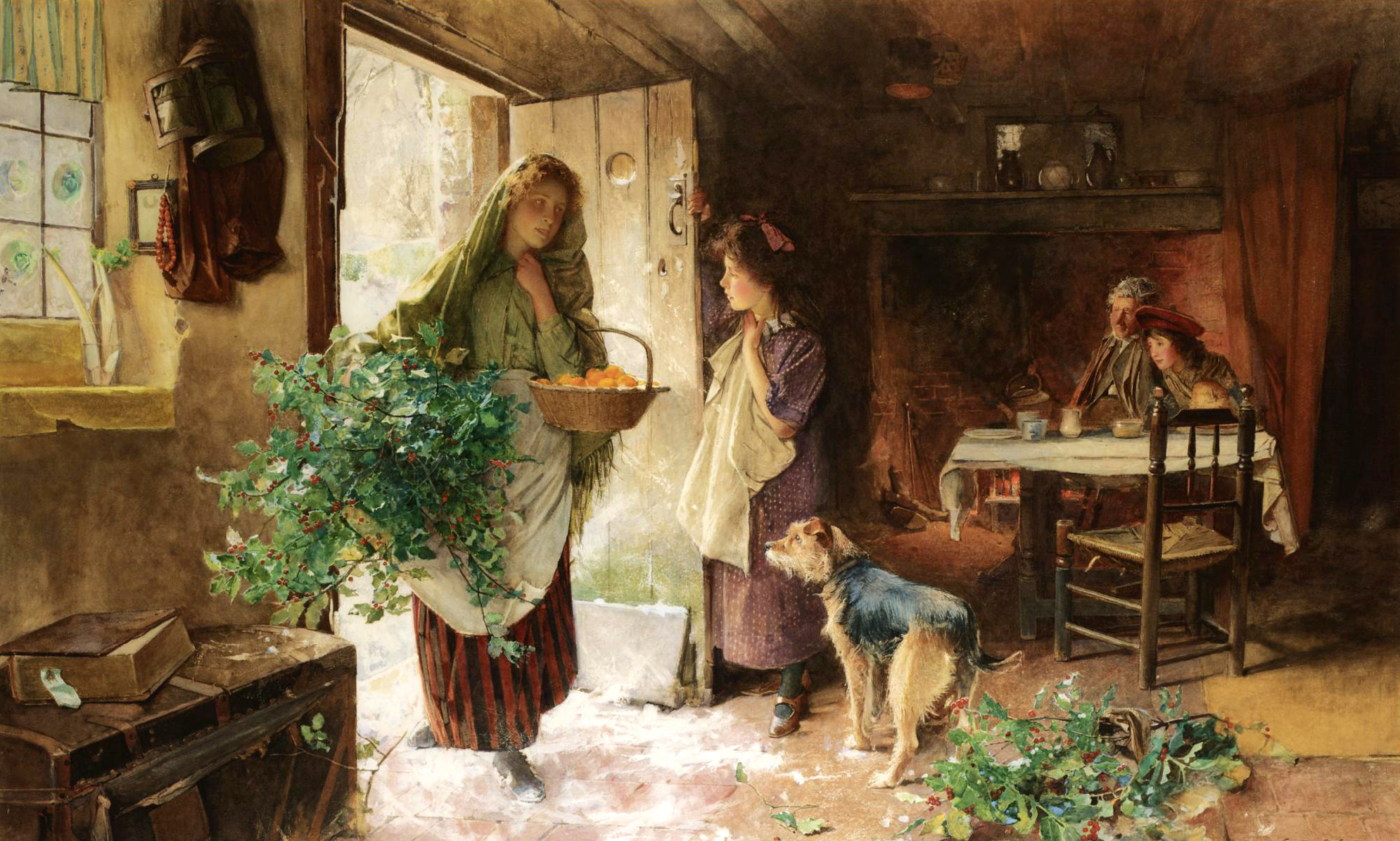
- Christmas Eve by Carlton Alfred Smith features a woman bringing home boughs of holly to decorate her home for Christmas.

Origin
- Origin: English, Irish
- Meaning: location name, reference to the holly tree

Other names
- Related names: Hallie, Hourie, Hollie, Holli, Halanydd

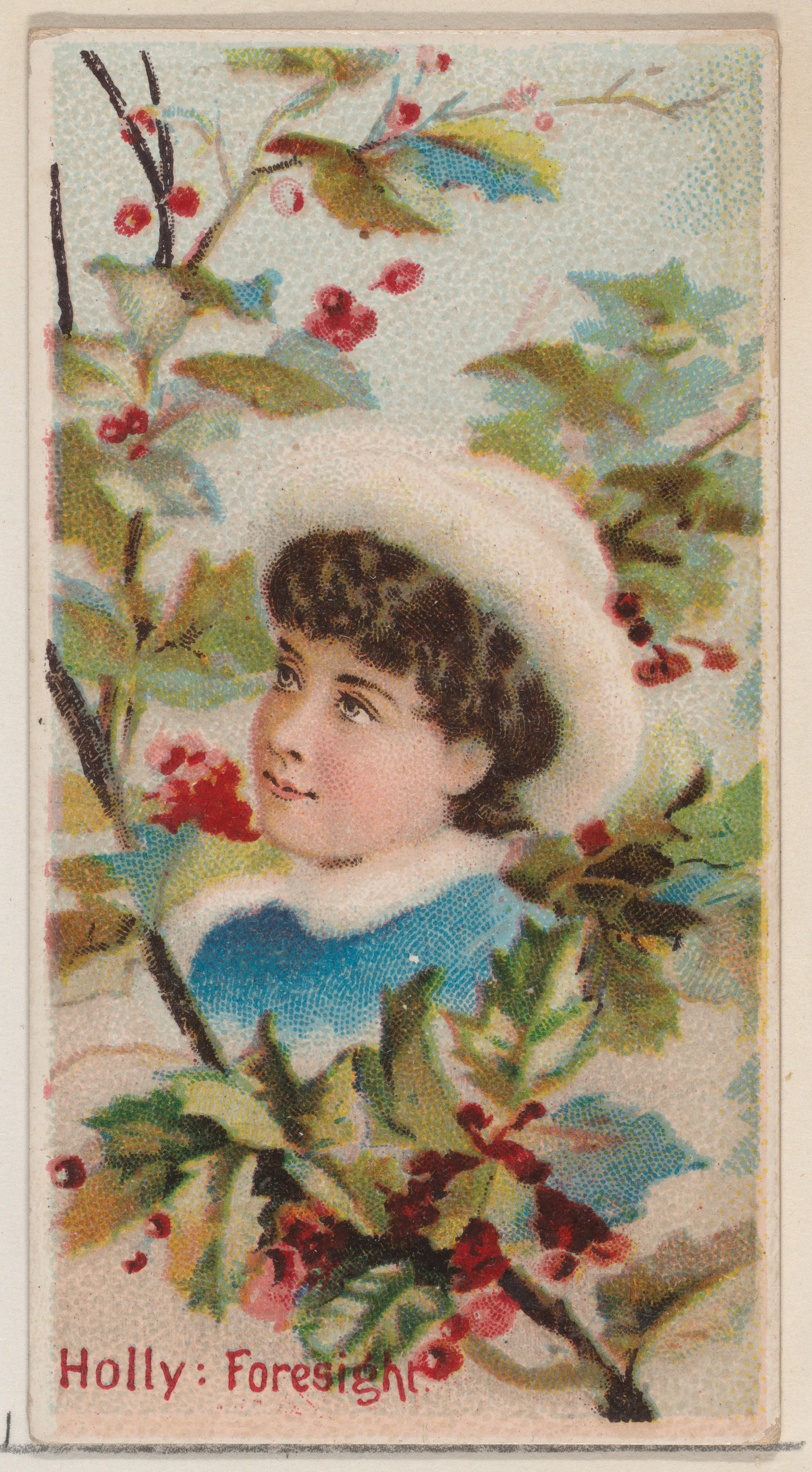
Holly is said to signify foresight in the language of flowers.

Holly is an English-language surname and given name.

Holly is known as an English or Irish surname (variant Holley) it is either locational, ultimately derived from the Old English hol lēah "[dwelling by] the clearing by the hollow", or descriptive, from hol-ēage "hollow-eyed". In Ireland, it was also used as a translation of the name Mac Cuilinn, which is derived from cuileann, the Gaelic name of the holly tree, and by extension sometimes of the similar-sounding McQuillan surname of Ulster. The masculine names Holly, Hollie were derived from the surname, but have mostly fallen out of use since the mid 20th century due to the rise in popularity of the feminine name. Hollis is an English surname derived from a Middle English holis "[dwelling by] holly trees"; it was also used as a masculine given name.

Holly (variants Hollie, Holley) was first used as a feminine given name in the 20th century, as a "botanical" name given to girls, in reference to, or at least secondarily associated with, the holly tree. While the feminine name is on record in the United States since the 1930s, its surge in popularity was due to Holly Golightly, the socialite protagonist in Truman Capote's Breakfast at Tiffany's (1958), which was made into a film starring Audrey Hepburn in 1961. The name of this character is stated to be short for Holiday (rather than a reference to the plant). The name peaked in popularity in the United States in the 1970s and 1980s, and has declined since, ranking at No. 449th place in the United States as of 2023. It was popularly given in England and Wales during the 2000s, staying in the top 30 girls' names throughout 1996 to 2012, with a peak at rank No. 12 in 2002 (and dropping to rank No. 135 as of 2023). A tendency to give the name to girls born on or near Christmas has also been observed. It has been the most popular name given to girls in Ireland who were born on Christmas Day and has also been more popular for girls there born in December than at other times of the year. More recent eccentric spellings of the feminine name include Holli (1970s), Holleigh, Hollee, and Hollye.

== Surname ==
- Alanson Holly (1810–1882), American politician
- Anton Holly (1875–1932), American politician
- Birdsill Holly (1820–1894), American inventor
- Buddy Holly (1936–1959), American rock and roll musician
- Charles Frederick Holly (1819–1901), Justice of the Colorado Territorial Supreme Court
- Christy Holly (b. 1984/85), Northern Ireland footballer and football coach
- Daven Holly (b. 1982), American football player
- Ed Holly (1879–1973), American baseball player
- Lauren Holly (b. 1963), American actress

=== Pseudonym ===
- The Holly Cousins, a kayfabe family in American professional wrestling:
  - Hardcore Holly (born 1963)
  - Crash Holly (1971–2003)
  - Molly Holly (born 1977)

== Given name ==
=== Feminine ===
Holly
- Gender: Feminine

Origin
- Origin: plant name

Other names
- Related names: Hallie, Hollie, Hourie, Halanydd, Holli

- Holly Aird (b. 1969), British actress
- Holly Aitchison (born 1997), English rugby union player
- Holly Alex, Scottish writer
- Holly Andres (born 1977), American photographer
- Holly Aprile (born 1969), American softball pitcher
- Holly Archer (born 1993), British athlete
- Holly Arntzen, Canadian singer, dulcimerist, and pianist
- Holly Barnard, American geographer
- Holly Barratt (born 1988), Australian swimmer
- Holly Bass, American poet, writer, journalist, educator and cultural activist
- Holly Black (born 1971), American writer and editor, author of The Spiderwick Chronicles
- Holly Block (1958–2017), American museum and art gallery director
- Holly Bobo (1990–c. April 13, 2011), American murder victim
- Holly Bodimeade (born 1995), English actress
- Holly Brown-Borg, American biologist and biogerontologist
- Holly Cairns (b. 1989), Irish politician
- Holly Cattle (b. 1997), English actress
- Holly Cole (b. 1963), Canadian jazz singer
- Holly Marie Combs (b. 1973), American actress
- Holly Dorger (b. 1989), American ballet dancer
- Holly Dunn (1957–2016), American country music singer-songwriter
- Holly Eaton, American politician
- Holly Earl (b. 1992), British actress
- Holley Fain (b. 1981), American actress
- Holly Glynn (1966–1987), formerly unidentified American woman
- Holly Golightly Smith (b. 1966), British singer and songwriter
- Holly Holyoake (b. 1988), Welsh soprano
- Holly Hamilton, British journalist and presenter
- Holly Harris (born 2002), Australian figure skater
- Holly Holm (born 1981), American boxer, kickboxer, and mixed martial arts fighter
- Holly Humberstone (born 1999), English singer-songwriter
- Holly Hunter (b. 1958), American actress
- Holly Jack, Scottish actress and acting coach
- Holly Jones, American restoration ecologist and conservation biologist
- Holly Jones (1992–2003), Canadian murder victim
- Holly Krieger, American mathematician
- Holly Lincoln (b. 1985), Canadian soccer forward
- Holly Lyon, American politician
- Holly Madison, (b. 1979), American model
- Holly Maguigan (1945–2023), American lawyer
- Holley Mangold (b. 1989), American athlete
- Holly McNamara (born 2003), Australian footballer
- Holly Miranda (b. 1983), American singer
- Holly O'Neill (born 1998), Canadian soccer player
- Holly Palance (b. 1950), American actress, daughter of veteran actor Jack Palance
- Holly Robinson Peete (b. 1964), American actress, singer and author
- Holly Piirainen (1983–1993), American murder victim
- Holly Rankin (born 1991), professional name of Jack River, Australian singer-songwriter
- Holly Ross, English musician
- Holly Roth (born 1916, disappeared 1964), American crime writer who disappeared at sea
- Holley Rubinsky (1943–2015), Canadian-American fiction writer
- Holly Schepisi (born 1971), American politician
- Holly Shervey (born 1989), New Zealand television and film actress and writer
- Holly Stover, American politician
- Holly Valance (née Vukadinović, b. 1983), Australian-British actress, singer and model
- Holly Beth Vincent (born 1956), American singer, songwriter, multi-instrumentalist and record producer
- Holly Walsh (b. 1980), British comedian
- Holly Willoughby (b. 1981), British television presenter
- Holly Humberstone, British singer-songwriter
- Holly Tucker, American singer)
- Holly Tucker, English entrepreneur)

==== Pseudonym ====
- Holly Golightly (illustrator) (b. 1964), American comic book writer and artist
- Holly Sampson (b. 1973), American porn performer
- Holly Woodlawn (1946–2015), Puerto Rican actress

==== Fictional characters ====
- Holly, a character in the British CBeebies series Everything's Rosie
- Holly, a character in the 2006 American parody Scary Movie 4
- Holly/Hero Girl, a character in the 2004 animated film The Polar Express
- Holly Crosby, a character in the 2008 Christmas television Moonlight and Mistletoe
- Holly Flax, a character on The Office (2005)
- Holly Gennero-McClane, a character from the Die Hard franchise (1988)
- Holly Gibney, a character in several novels by Stephen King
- Holly Golightly, the heroine in Truman Capote's Breakfast at Tiffany's (1958), made into a film starring Audrey Hepburn in 1961
- Holly Herkimer, a character in the U.S. version of Shameless
- Holly Hills, a character in the Diary of a Wimpy Kid franchise
- Holly Hobbie, American children character and pseudonym of the author (Denise Holly Ulinskas (b. 1944))
- Holly Holliday, a character from Glee, played by Gwyneth Paltrow (2009)
- Holly Faye Lovell, the main character in the 2004 ABC Family television movie titled Brave New Girl
- Holly Marshall, a character in 1974 TV series The Land of the Lost
- Holly (Red Dwarf), a central character on the British TV series Red Dwarf (1988) – the character is a computer and was played by a female actor in later series
- Holly Robinson, DC Comics character and a frequent ally and sidekick of Catwoman (1987)
- Holly Sutton-Scorpio, a character in the American daytime drama General Hospital
- Holly Thompson, a character in the 1988 American science-fiction action thriller movie They Live
- Holly Wheeler, a character from Netflix TV Series Stranger Things
- Holly White, a character on AMC crime drama Breaking Bad (2008)
- Holly Vega, a recurring character and mother to Tori and Trina in the Nickelodeon television series Victorious
- Princess Holly, the titular protagonist in the British cartoon Ben and Holly's Little Kingdom
- Holly, a Fireside Girl from the Disney animated television series Phineas and Ferb

=== Masculine ===
Holly
- Gender: Masculine

Origin
- Origin: from the surname

Other names
- Alternative spelling: Hollie

- Holly Alphin (1926–1998), American football player
- Holly Betaudier, known as Holly B (1925–2016), radio and television personality from Trinidad and Tobago
- Holly Broadbent Jr. (1918–2009), American orthodontist
- Holly Broadbent Sr. (1894–1977), American orthodontist
- Holly Campbell (1907–1979), American track and field athlete
- Holley Cantine (1916–1977), American writer and activist
- Holly Farrar, American football player and coach
- Holly Hollingshead (1853–1926), Major League Baseball center fielder
- Holly Johnson (William Holly Johnson, b. 1960), English singer
- Holley Mims (1929–1970), American boxer
- Holly One (1965–2006), Italian porn star
- Holly Tshimanga (born 1997), Belgian footballer
- Holly Whyte (1917–1999), American urbanist and sociologist

==== Fictional characters ====
- Holly Martins, played by Joseph Cotten in Carol Reed's The Third Man (1949)
- Holly (Red Dwarf), a central character on the British TV series Red Dwarf (1988)

== See also ==
- Holliday (name)
