= Xi Psi Phi =

International dentistry fraternity

- ΞΨΦ
- Founded: February 8, 1889; 137 years ago University of Michigan School of Dentistry
- Type: Professional
- Affiliation: Independent
- Former affiliation: PFA; PIC
- Status: Active
- Emphasis: Dental
- Scope: International
- Motto: "Hospitality is the life of friendship"
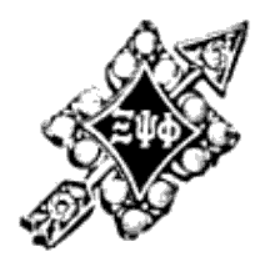
- Member badge
- Colors: Lavender and Cream
- Flower: Red Rose
- Publication: Xi Psi Phi Quarterly
- Chapters: 19
- Headquarters: Xi Psi Phi; 160 South Bellwood Drive, Suite Z East Alton, Illinois 29407; United States
- Website: www.xipsiphi.org

Xi Psi Phi International Dental Fraternity (ΞΨΦ) is an international professional fraternity for dentistry. It was founded on February 8, 1889. Xi Psi Phi was the second professional dental fraternity to be formed, following Delta Sigma Delta (1882) and pre-dating Psi Omega (1892) and Alpha Omega (1907).

== History ==
Xi Psi Phi was organized on February 8, 1889 at the University of Michigan by Arthur A. Deyoe, Lewis C. Thayer, William F. Gary, Walter H. Booth, Gordon C. McCoy and Eldon Waterloo. In addition, Fifteen others are counted as associate founders. The fraternity was incorporated on February 6, 1906 in the State of Illinois.

Originally five freshman dental students at the University of Michigan at Ann Arbor felt the need to create a club among freshman dental students for intellectual and social interaction. They decided to organize a “dental brothers guild,” first named Delta Beta Gamma. During the winter of 1888, the five freshman students (Walter H. Booth, Arthur A. Deyoe, Gordon C. McCoy, Lewis C. Thayer and Eldon Waterloo) and one junior student (William F. Gray) prepared to start such a club.

In order to complete the organization details before the close of the school year, they had admitted to membership a few students whose qualifications were not of a high standard. To correct the situation, the group decided to disband and to reorganize under the name of Xi Psi Phi on February 8, 1889. Lewis C. Thayer became the first president and the offices of vice president, secretary and treasurer were held by George C. Thuerer, William F. Gray and Charles E. Collamer, respectively.

The Articles of Association for Alpha chapter of Xi Psi Phi were recorded in the Office of the Secretary of State of Michigan on May 2, 1892. When announcement of becoming a national Fraternity was made, inquiries with regard to charters came from students in dental schools from all across the country. The first charters then issued by Alpha chapter were to Beta chapter at New York College of Dental Surgery; Delta chapter at Baltimore College of Dental Surgery; Epsilon chapter at University of Iowa College of Dentistry; Eta chapter, University of Maryland School of Dentistry; and Theta chapter at Indiana University School of Dentistry. During the next eleven years, 15 subordinate collegiate chapters were formed.

=== Publications and Governance Structure ===
In 1899, the first issue of the Xi Psi Phi Quarterly magazine was published with Marvin J. Houghton, Alpha ’00, as editor-in-chief. C.C. Markey, Alpha ’00, and E. M. Brown, Alpha ’00, served as associate editors. An editorial in the March 1900 issue of the Quarterly stated: “The remarkable growth of the Fraternity since its organization, its constantly increasing membership, the interest elicited by members young and old, have rendered the time ripe for a national convention. The time is past when Alpha chapter should be recognized head of the Fraternity; the work has gone beyond the range of a few men located in the one college. Alpha wishes to share with all and all alike, the honors of the Fraternity.”

At the subsequent first national convention on June 16, 1901 the Supreme Chapter was organized with delegates from most of the subordinate chapters present. Guy S. Millberry, Iota ’00, was elected to serve as the first Supreme President.

On June 17, 1901, the original Constitution, written in 1899 by Frank P. Watson, was rewritten giving the composition of the Fraternity as a “Supreme Chapter, Supreme Council, Greek Letter Chapters and Alumni Association.” In addition, a Fraternity crest was adopted, the red rose was selected as the Fraternity flower, and the motto and the Fraternity colors of lavender and cream were approved at that time.

On February 6, 1906, a petition for incorporation was granted by the State of Illinois and a board of directors was created to supplement the Supreme Council.

In 1913, the National Alumni Chapter was organized. A Life Membership plan was adopted in 1931; however, that plan was discontinued in 1959.

=== Recent History ===
In 1963 a new Honorary Membership category was created. The 1972 Supreme Chapter Assembly eliminated the requirement that all members be male, thus permitting the initiation of female students and dentists.

Xi Psi Phi Fraternity became a charter member of the Professional Fraternity Association in 1978, but is no longer active in that association.

The Fraternity continues to publish its quarterly journal, Xi Psi Phi, recent issues available here.

== Symbols ==
Xi Psi Phi's motto is "Hospitality is the life of friendship". Its insignia is a four-leaf gold pin, with three pearls set in each leaf, surmounted by a diamond shaped black-enamel piece bearing the Greek Letters ΞΨΦ.

The fraternity's colors are lavender and cream. Its flower is the red rose. Fraternity members are called "Zips" as a popular nickname. The fraternity's publication is Xi Psi Phi Quarterly.

== Chapters ==
The Society has established 63 chapters since 1889. Of these, 19 are active.

== See also ==
- Professional fraternities and sororities
- Delta Sigma Delta
- Psi Omega
- Alpha Omega
- Omicron Kappa Upsilon
- Sigma Phi Alpha
- List of dental schools in the United States
- List of defunct dental schools in the United States
