= Psi Omega =

Professional dentistry fraternity

- ΨΩ
- Founded: June 8, 1892; 134 years ago Baltimore College of Dental Surgery (now U Maryland)
- Type: Professional
- Affiliation: Independent
- Former affiliation: PFA
- Status: Active
- Emphasis: Dental
- Scope: International
- Member badge
- Colors: Blue and White
- Publication: The Frater (of Psi Omega)
- Chapters: 27 active
- Headquarters: 1040 Savannah Highway; Charleston, South Carolina 29407; United States
- Website: psiomegafraternity.org

Psi Omega (ΨΩ) is an international professional fraternity for Dentistry. It was founded on June 8, 1892, "to maintain the standards of the profession, to encourage scientific investigation and literary culture." Psi Omega is the third professional dental fraternity to be formed, following Delta Sigma Delta (1882) and Xi Psi Phi (1889), and pre-dating Alpha Omega (1907). Psi Omega has 27 active chapters.

== History ==
Psi Omega was first conceived during the 1891-1892 term by two students at the Baltimore College of Dental Surgery, William Sprigg Hamilton and J. George Schmetzer, both of the class of 1894, who determined to start a dental fraternity. These two men are considered the founders of the Fraternity. Hamilton wrote its first Ritual and Constitution, which was adopted on June 8, 1892. The Baltimore College of Dental Surgery was the first institution to offer a D.D.S. (Doctor of Dental Surgery) degree, and is considered the world's first dental college.

Within a few years of its founding the Fraternity began a rapid period of growth, adding six chapters in 1896 alone to its first four. Likewise, 1897 brought five more chapters, continuing the pace that would see 25 chapters formed by the end of the Fraternity's first decade. Consolidations of schools led to mergers of chapters, and in at least one instance, a previous chapter, Lambda at Minnesota was replaced after it had gone dormant with a new chapter and new designation, Zeta Kappa, at the same school (Minnesota). Expansion continued, resulting in a chapter count of 65 as of 1975. The Fraternity has graduated 32,000 members since its founding, according to one chapter's website.

Psi Omega's international reach extended to three Canadian chapters, located in Toronto, Montreal, and Halifax. All three ceased operations in the 1930s.

Psi Omega Fraternity became a charter member of the Professional Fraternity Association in 1978, but is no longer active in that association.

== Organization ==
Government is maintained by a triennial convention called the grand chapter, with recess administration held by a board of officers as the National Council. The Central Office is responsible for daily management of the Fraternity. Where formerly the national chief officer was called the grand master, in more recent times this role is held by a president. The fraternity is divided into five provinces, where each elects a Province Councilor. These five Province Councilors, with the President, make up the National Council.

Each school chapter elects an advisor known as a Deputy Councilor from among the active alumni.

== Chapters ==
The Society has established 68 chapters since 1892. Of these, 27 are active, complemented by 30 alumni chapters.

== Membership Requirements ==
School chapters consist of initiated fraternity members and can be either undergraduate students or graduate dental students.

Alumni chapters consist of initiated fraternity members who have attained either the DDS (Degree of Doctor of Dental Surgery) or DMD (Doctor of Dental Medicine) degrees, and may include initiated honorary members.

== Scholarships, Awards and Aid ==
The Fraternity provides several types of assistance to active members. These include:

- Student loans of up to $3,000, with interest deferred until after graduation.
- Chapter house loans
- Annual Awards given to both chapters and individual members

In addition, Psi Omega provides a variety of insurance programs popular among members and alumni through group purchasing discounts.

== Publications ==
The Fraternity publishes a quarterly journal, The Frater, recent issues available here, which was first published in 1900. Scholarly papers written by members add interest to The Frater, helping continue alumni interest in the Fraternity.

The Fraternity maintains a website with information for chapters, alumni and institutions. Members and guests are welcome to visit the site or to contact the National Office through e-mail for further information.

== Traditions ==
The badge of the Psi Omega Fraternity is an heraldic shield of gold with a slightly curved field of black enamel on which are displayed a caduceus, the letters ΨΩ, and three ivy-leaves. Colors are blue and white.

== See also ==
- Professional fraternities and sororities
- Delta Sigma Delta
- Xi Psi Phi
- Alpha Omega
- Omicron Kappa Upsilon
- Sigma Phi Alpha
- List of dental schools in the United States
- List of defunct dental schools in the United States
