= Holly Broadbent =

Holly Broadbent may refer to:

- Holly Broadbent Jr. (1928–2009), American orthodontist
- Holly Broadbent Sr. (1894–1977), American orthodontist
