= List of Sigma Phi Alpha chapters =

Sigma Phi Alpha (ΣΦΑ) is a national honor society for women in the field of dental hygiene. In the following list of chapters, active chapters are indicated in bold and inactive chapters and institutions are in italics.

Chapter	Charter date and range	Institution	City or county	State or province	Region	Status	Ref.
**Supreme**	1958	honorary				Active	
Alpha	1958	Northwestern University	Evanston	Illinois	Central	Inactive	
**Beta**	1958	Texas A&M University College of Dentistry	Dallas	Texas	Western	Active	(Note: Chapter formed at the Baylor College of Dentistry which became part of Texas A&M University in September 1996.)
**Gamma**	1958	University of Bridgeport Fones School of Dental Hygiene	Bridgeport	Connecticut	Eastern	Active	
**Delta**	1958	West Liberty University	West Liberty	West Virginia	Eastern	Active	
Epsilon	1958–xxxx ?	University of Iowa	Iowa City	Iowa	Central	Inactive	
**Zeta**	1958	Ohio State University College of Dentistry	Columbus	Ohio	Central	Active	
**Eta**	1958	University of Minnesota	Minneapolis	Minnesota	Central	Active	
**Theta**	1958	Indiana University School of Dentistry	Indianapolis	Indiana	Central	Active	
Iota	1959–xxxx ?	University of Pennsylvania	Philadelphia	Pennsylvania	Eastern	Inactive	
**Kappa**	1959	Temple University	Philadelphia	Pennsylvania	Eastern	Active	
Lambda	1959–xxxx ?	Columbia University	New York City	New York	Eastern	Inactive	
Mu	1959–xxxx ?	Howard University	Washington	District of Columbia	Eastern	Inactive	
**Nu**	April 1959	University of Michigan School of Dentistry	Pleasant Ridge	Michigan	Central	Active	
**Xi**	1959	University of North Carolina at Chapel Hill	Chapel Hill	North Carolina	Eastern	Active	
Omicron	1960–xxxx ?	Meharry Medical College School of Dentistry	Nashville	Tennessee	Central	Inactive	
**Pi**	1960	Massachusetts College of Pharmacy and Health Sciences Forsyth School of Dental Hygienists	Boston	Massachusetts	Eastern	Active	(Note: Chapter formed at Forsyth Dental Infirmary.)
**Rho**	1960	University of Tennessee Health Science Center	Memphis	Tennessee	Central	Active	
Sigma	1958–xxxx ?	University of Washington	Seattle	Washington	Western	Inactive	
Tau	1960–xxxx ?	Marquette University	Milwaukee	Wisconsin	Central	Inactive	
**Upsilon**	1960–19xx; xxxx ?	SUNY Broome Community College	Binghamton	New York	Eastern	Active	
**Phi**	1961	Vermont Technical College	Williston	Vermont	Eastern	Active	
Chi	1961–xxxx ?	Loyola University Chicago	Chicago	Illinois	Central	Inactive	
Psi first	1962–1990	Fairleigh Dickinson University School of Dental Medicine	Rutherford	New Jersey	Eastern	Active	(Note: When the Fairleigh Dickenson School of Dental Medicine closed after the 1989-90 school year, the chapter and some of its members moved to New York University College of Dentistry.)
**Psi**	1990	New York University College of Dentistry	New York City	New York	Eastern	Active	(Note: Chapter formed at Fairleigh Dickinson.) (Note: Chapter formed the relocation of Pi first chapter, formerly of Fairleigh Dickenson University.)
**Omega**	1962	University of Detroit Mercy School of Dentistry	Sterling Heights	Michigan	Central	Active	
**Alpha Alpha**	1962	Loma Linda University	Loma Linda	California	Western	Active	
**Alpha Beta**	1963	University of New England Westbrook College Campus	Portland	Maine	Eastern	Active	(Note: Chapter formed at Westbrook Junior College)
**Alpha Gamma**	1963	University of Missouri–Kansas City School of Dentistry	Kansas City	Missouri	Central	Active	
**Alpha Delta**	1963	New York City College of Technology	Brooklyn	New York	Eastern	Active	
**Alpha Epsilon**	1964	University of Texas Health Science Center at Houston School of Dentistry	Houston	Texas	Western	Active	
Alpha Zeta	1965–xxxx ?	Colorado Northwestern Community College	Rangely	Colorado	Western	Inactive	(Note: Chapter was established at Rangely College, now Colorado Northwestern Community College.)
Alpha Eta	1965	Pensacola Junior College	Pensacola	Florida	Eastern	Inactive	(Note: Pensacola Junior College is now Pensacola State College,)
**Alpha Theta**	1965–19xx ?; xxxx ?	University of Louisville	Louisville	Kentucky	Central	Active	
Alpha Iota	1966–xxxx ?	Indiana University–Purdue University Fort Wayne	Fort Wayne	Indiana	Central	Inactive	
**Alpha Kappa**	1967	University of Hawaiʻi at Mānoa	Honolulu	Hawaii	Western	Active	
**Alpha Lambda**	1967	University of Nebraska Medical Center College of Dentistry	Lincoln	Nebraska	Central	Active	
**Alpha Mu**	1967–19xx ?	Farmingdale State College	Farmingdale	New York	Eastern	Active	
**Alpha Nu**	1967	Ferris State University	Big Rapids	Michigan	Central	Active	
**Alpha Xi**	1967	West Virginia University School of Dentistry	Morgantown	West Virginia	Eastern	Active	
Alpha Omicron	1968–19xx ?	Diablo Valley College	Pleasant Hill	California	Western	Inactive	
**Alpha Pi**	1968	Palm Beach State College	Lake Worth	Florida	Eastern	Active	(Note: Chapter started at Palm Beach Junior College, now Palm Beach State College.)
Alpha Rho	1968–xxxx ?	Midlands Technical College	Richland County	South Carolina	Eastern	Inactive	
**Alpha Sigma**	1969	Southern Illinois University	Carbondale	Illinois	Central	Active	
Alpha Tau	1969–19xx ?	Bluegrass Community and Technical College - Cooper Campus	Lexington	Kentucky	Central	Inactive	(Note: Chapter was formed at Lexington Community College. In 2004, Lexington Community College and Central Kentucky Technical College merged to form Bluegrass Community and Technical College.)
**Alpha Upsilon**	1969	St. Petersburg College	Seminole	Florida	Eastern	Active	(Note: Chapter formed at St. Petersburg Junior College which is now St. Petersburg College.)
**Alpha Phi**	1969	Old Dominion University School of Dental Hygiene	Norfolk	Virginia	Eastern	Active	
**Alpha Chi**	1970	University of South Dakota	Vermillion	South Dakota	Central	Active	
**Alpha Psi**	1971	University of Arkansas for Medical Sciences	Little Rock	Arkansas	Central	Active	
**Alpha Omega**	1971	Harper College	Palatine	Illinois	Central	Active	
Alpha Alpha Alpha	1971–xxxx ?	Greenville Technical College	Greenville	South Carolina	Eastern	Inactive	
Alpha Alpha Beta first	1971–19xx ?	Los Angeles City College	Los Angeles	California	Western	Active	
**Alpha Alpha Beta**		West Los Angeles College	Ojai	California	Western	Active	
**Alpha Alpha Gamma**	1971	Virginia Commonwealth University	Midlothian	Virginia	Eastern	Active	
**Alpha Alpha Delta**	1972–19xx ?; xxxx ?	St. Louis Community College–Forest Park	St. Louis	Missouri	Central	Active	(Note: Chapter was formed at Forest Park Community College which became St. Louis Community College–Forest Park in 1976.)
Alpha Alpha Epsilon	1972–xxxx ?	Loyola University Health Sciences Campus	Maywood	Illinois	Central	Inactive	
**Alpha Alpha Zeta**	1973	University of Cincinnati Blue Ash College	Blue Ash	Ohio	Central	Active	
**Alpha Alpha Eta**	1973	University of Maryland School of Dentistry	Baltimore	Maryland	Eastern	Active	
**Alpha Alpha Theta**	1973	Wichita State University	Wichita	Kansas	Central	Active	
**Alpha Alpha Iota**	1974	Lake Land College	Mattoon	Illinois	Central	Active	
**Alpha Alpha Kappa**	1974	Del Mar College	Corpus Christi	Texas	Western	Active	
Alpha Alpha Lambda	1974–xxxx ?	Baltimore City Community College	Baltimore	Maryland	Eastern	Inactive	
**Alpha Alpha Mu**	1974	Eastern Washington University	Spokane	Washington	Western	Active	
Alpha Alpha Nu	1974–xxxx ?	Foothill College	Los Altos Hills	California	Western	Inactive	
**Alpha Alpha Xi**	1975	Clayton State University	Morow	Georgia	Eastern	Active	
Alpha Alpha Omicron	1975–xxxx ?	Indiana University South Bend	South Bend	Indiana	Central	Inactive	
Alpha Alpha Pi	1975–xxxx ?	Normandale Community College	Bloomington	Minnesota	Central	Inactive	
**Alpha Alpha Rho**	1975	Texas Woman's University	Denton	Texas	Western	Active	
Alpha Alpha Sigma	1975–xxxx ?	New Hampshire Technical Institute – Concord's Community College	Concord	New Hampshire	Eastern	Inactive	
**Alpha Alpha Tau**	1975	Albany State University	Albany	Georgia	Eastern	Active	(Note: Chapter formed at Albany Junior College which became Darton State College in 1987. It merged with Albany State University in 2016.)
Alpha Alpha Upsilon	1975–xxxx ?	University of Minnesota Duluth	Duluth	Minnesota	Central	Inactive	
Alpha Alpha Phi	1975–xxxx ?	Onondaga Community College	Syracuse	New York	Eastern	Inactive	
**Alpha Alpha Chi**	1975	Louisiana State University School of Dentistry	New Orleans	Louisiana	Central	Active	
Alpha Alpha Psi	1975–xxxx ?	Northampton Community College	Bethlehem	Pennsylvania	Eastern	Inactive	
**Alpha Alpha Omega**	1976	Prairie State College	Chicago Heights	Illinois	Central	Active	
**Beta Alpha**	1976	Tyler Junior College	Tyler	Texas	Western	Active	(Note: Chapter was originally called Alpha Alpha Alpha Alpha.)
**Beta Beta**	1976	Bristol Community College	Fall River	Massachusetts	Eastern	Active	(Note: Chapter was originally called Alpha Alpha Alpha Beta.)
**Beta Gamma**	1976	Parkland College	Champaign	Illinois	Central	Active	(Note: Chapter was originally called Alpha Alpha Alpha Gamma.)
**Beta Delta**		University of Oklahoma College of Dentistry	Oklahoma City	Oklahoma	Western	Active	
Beta Epsilon						Inactive	
**Beta Zeta**	1977	Montgomery County Community College	Blue Bell	Pennsylvania	Eastern	Active	
**Beta Eta**	1977	Camden County College	Blackwood	New Jersey	Eastern	Active	
**Beta Theta**	1977	Owens Community College	Toledo	Ohio	Central	Active	
**Beta Iota**		University of Louisiana at Monroe	Monroe	Louisiana	Central	Active	
**Beta Kappa**	1977	SUNY Erie North Campus	Williamsville	New York	Eastern	Active	(Note: The chapter was organized at Erie Community College which is now called SUNY Erie.)
Beta Lambda						Inactive	
**Beta Mu**	1977	Weber State University	Odgen	Utah	Western	Active	
**Beta Nu**		Johnson County Community College	Overland Park	Kansas	Central	Active	
Beta Xi						Inactive	
**Beta Omicron**	1977	Rose State College	Midwest City	Oklahoma	Western	Active	
Beta Pi						Inactive	
**Beta Rho**	1978	Lamar Institute of Technology	Beaumont	Texas	Western	Active	
**Beta Sigma**	1978	University of Texas Health Science Center at San Antonio	San Antonio	Texas	Western	Active	
Beta Tau						Inactive	
**Beta Upsilon**	1979	Augusta University Dental College of Georgia	Augusta	Georgia	Eastern	Active	(Note: Chapter formed at Georgia Regents University which became Augusta University.)
Beta Phi						Inactive	
Beta Chi		Northern Arizona University	Flagstaff	Arizona	Western	Inactive	
**Beta Psi**	1979	Allegany College of Maryland	Cumberland	Maryland	Eastern	Active	
Beta Omega		West Virginia University	Morgantown	West Virginia	Eastern	Inactive	
**Beta Beta Alpha**	1979	Tunxis Community College	Farmington	Connecticut	Eastern	Active	
**Beta Beta Beta**	1980	College of Southern Nevada	Las Vegas	Nevada	Western	Active	
Beta Beta Gamma						Inactive	
Beta Beta Delta						Inactive	
**Beta Beta Epsilon**	1981	Clark College	Vancouver	Washington	Western	Active	
**Beta Beta Zeta**	1981	James A. Rhodes State College	Lima	Ohio	Central	Active	
Beta Beta Eta						Inactive	
**Beta Beta Theta**		Tarrant County College	Hurst	Texas	Western	Active	
**Beta Beta Iota**	1984	Idaho State University	Pocatello	Idaho	Western	Active	
**Beta Beta Kappa**	1984	Pennsylvania College of Technology	Williamsport	Pennsylvania	Eastern	Active	
**Beta Beta Lambda**	1985	Central Community College	Hastings	Nebraska	Central	Active	
Beta Beta Mu						Inactive	
**Beta Beta Nu**	1986	Perimeter College at Georgia State University	Dunwoody	Georgia	Eastern	Active	(Note: Chapter formed at Georgia Perimeter College which became Perimeter College at Georgia State University in 2016.)
**Beta Beta Xi**		University of Southern Indiana	Evansville	Indiana	Central	Active	
Beta Beta Omicron						Inactive	
Beta Beta Pi						Inactive	
Beta Beta Rho						Inactive	
**Beta Beta Sigma**	1986	Pueblo Community College	Pueblo	Colorado	Western	Active	
Beta Beta Tau						Inactive	
Beta Beta Upsilon						Inactive	
Beta Beta Phi						Inactive	
**Beta Beta Chi**	1983	Luzerne County Community College	Nanticoke	Pennsylvania	Eastern	Active	
**Beta Beta Psi**	1986	Wayne County Community College District	Detroit	Michigan	Central	Active	
Beta Beta Omega						Inactive	
**Chi Alpha**	1988	Western Kentucky University	Bowling Green	Kentucky	Central	Active	
**Chi Beta**	1988	Pierce College Fort Steilacoom	Lakewood	Washington	Western	Active	
Chi Gamma						Inactive	
**Chi Delta**	1990	Shoreline Community College	Shoreline	Washington	Western	Active	
Chi Epsilon						Inactive	
**Chi Zeta**	1992	Harrisburg Area Community College	Harrisburg	Pennsylvania	Eastern	Active	
Chi Eta						Inactive	
Chi Theta						Inactive	
Chi Iota						Inactive	
**Chi Kappa**	1990	Pasadena City College	Burbank	California	Western	Active	
Chi Lambda						Inactive	
Chi Mu						Inactive	
Chi Nu						Inactive	
**Chi Xi**	1991	Harcum College	Bryn Mawr	Pennsylvania	Eastern	Active	
Chi Omicron						Inactive	
**Chi Pi**	1991	University of Maine at Augusta Bangor Campus	Bangor	Maine	Eastern	Active	
**Chi Rho**	1991	University of Pittsburgh	Pittsburgh	Pennsylvania	Eastern	Active	
Chi Sigma						Inactive	
Chi Tau						Inactive	
Chi Upsilon						Inactive	
**Chi Phi**	1991	East Tennessee State University	Johnson City	Tennessee	Central	Active	
**Chi Chi**		Delaware Technical Community College	Wilmington	Delaware	Eastern	Active	
**Chi Psi**	1991	University of New Mexico	Albuquerque	New Mexico	Western	Active	
**Chi Omega**		Valencia College	Orlando	Florida	Eastern	Active	
**Chi Chi Alpha**	1993	Tulsa Community College	Tulsa	Oklahoma	Western	Active	
**Chi Chi Beta**	1993	Laramie County Community College	Cheyenne	Wyoming	Western	Active	
Chi Chi Gamma						Inactive	
**Chi Chi Delta**		Pima Community College	Tucson	Arizona	Western	Active	
**Chi Chi Epsilon**	1993	University of Mississippi Medical Center	Jackson	Mississippi	Central	Active	
**Chi Chi Zeta**	1995	Missouri Southern State University	Joplin	Missouri	Central	Active	
**Chi Chi Eta**	1993	Bergen Community College	Paramus	New Jersey	Eastern	Active	
**Chi Chi Theta**	1995	Northeast Mississippi Community College	Booneville	Mississippi	Central	Active	
Chi Chi Iota						Inactive	
**Chi Chi Kappa**	1993	Quinsigamond Community College	Worcester	Massachusetts	Eastern	Active	
**Chi Chi Lambda**		Lanier Technical College	Oakwood	Georgia	Eastern	Active	
**Chi Chi Mu**		Mt. Hood Community College	Gresham	Oregon	Western	Active	
**Chi Chi Nu**	1994	Pearl River Community College	Poplarville, Mississippi	Mississippi	Central	Active	
**Chi Chi Xi**	1995	Waukesha County Technical College	Pewaukee	Wisconsin	Central	Active	
**Chi Chi Omicron**	1995	Minnesota State University, Mankato	Mankato	Minnesota	Central	Active	
**Chi Chi Pi**	1995	Virginia Western Community College	Roanoke	Virginia	Eastern	Active	
Chi Chi Rho						Inactive	
**Chi Chi Sigma**		Guilford Technical Community College	Jamestown	North Carolina	Eastern	Active	
Chi Chi Tau						Inactive	
**Chi Chi Upsilon**	1995	Lakeland Community College	Kirtland	Ohio	Central	Active	
**Chi Chi Phi**	1995	Chattanooga State Community College	Chattanooga	Tennessee	Central	Active	
Chi Chi Chi						Inactive	
**Chi Chi Psi**	1995	Trident Technical College	Charleston	South Carolina	Eastern	Active	
**Delta Alpha**	1995	Tallahassee Community College	Tallahassee	Florida	Eastern	Active	
Delta Beta						Inactive	
Delta Gamma		Asheville–Buncombe Technical Community College at Hendersonville	Hendersonville	North Carolina	Eastern	Inactive	
**Delta Delta**		Baker College of Port Huron	Port Huron	Missouri	Central	Active	
**Delta Epsilon**	1999	Wallace State Community College	Hanceville	Alabama	Central	Active	
Delta Zeta						Inactive	
**Delta Eta**	1996	University of Manitoba	Winnipeg	Manitoba, Canada	Western	Active	
Delta Theta						Inactive	
Delta Iota						Inactive	
**Delta Kappa**	1997	Salt Lake Community College	West Jordan	Utah	Western	Active	
**Delta Lambda**	1998	University of New Haven	West Haven	Connecticut	Eastern	Active	
Delta Mu						Inactive	
**Delta Nu**	1999	Lewis and Clark Community College	Godfrey	Illinois	Central	Active	
**Delta Xi**	1999	Blinn College Bryan Campus	Bryan	Texas	Western	Active	
**Delta Omicron**	1999	Collin College	McKinney	Texas	Western	Active	
**Delta Pi**	1999	Georgia Highlands College	Rome	Georgia	Eastern	Active	
Delta Rho						Inactive	
**Delta Sigma**	2000	Columbus State Community College	Columbus	Ohio	Central	Active	
**Delta Tau**	2000	Truckee Meadows Community College	Sparks	Nevada	Western	Active	
**Delta Upsilon**		Mount Ida College	Newton	Massachusetts	Eastern	Active	
Delta Phi						Inactive	
**Delta Chi**	2003	Rock Valley College	Rockford	Illinois	Central	Active	
Delta Psi						Inactive	
Delta Omega						Inactive	
Delta Delta Alpha						Inactive	
**Delta Delta Beta**	2005	Hillsborough Community College	Tampa	Florida	Eastern	Active	
**Delta Delta Gamma**	2005	Austin Community College	Austin	Texas	Western	Active	
**Delta Delta Delta**		Wake Technical Community College	Raleigh	North Carolina	Eastern	Active	
Delta Delta Epsilon						Inactive	
**Delta Delta Zeta**	2006	Northeast Texas Community College	Mount Pleasant	Texas	Western	Active	
**Delta Delta Eta**		Rowan College at Burlington County	Pemberton	New Jersey	Eastern	Active	(Note: Chapter formed at Burlington County College which became Rowan College at Burlington County in 2015.)
Delta Delta Theta						Inactive	
**Delta Delta Iota**		Forsyth Technical Community College	Winston-Salem	North Carolina	Eastern	Active	
**Delta Delta Kappa**	2007	Sheridan College	Sheridan	Wyoming	Western	Active	
Delta Delta Lambda						Inactive	
Delta Delta Mu	2008	Baker College of Auburn Hills	Auburn Hills	Michigan	Central	Inactive	(Note: Chapter went defunct when the Auburn Hills campus closed.)
Delta Delta Nu						Inactive	
**Delta Delta Xi**	2008	Pacific University	Hillsboro	Oregon	Western	Active	
**Delta Delta Omicron**		Lincoln College of New England	Southington	Connecticut	Eastern	Active	
Delta Delta Pi						Inactive	
Delta Delta Rho						Inactive	
**Delta Delta Sigma**	2010	West Georgia Technical College	Douglasville	Georgia	Eastern	Active	
**Delta Delta Tau**	2010	Central Georgia Technical College	Macon	Georgia	Eastern	Active	
**Delta Delta Upsilon**	2011	West Coast University	Anaheim	California	Western	Active	
**Delta Delta Phi**		Southwestern College	San Diego	California	Western	Active	
Delta Delta Chi						Inactive	
**Delta Delta Psi**		Central Carolina Community College	Sanford	North Carolina	Eastern	Active	
**Delta Delta Omega**	2013	Hudson Valley Community College	Troy	New York	Eastern	Active	
**Epsilon Alpha**	2013	Phoenix College	Phoenix	Arizona	Western	Active	
**Epsilon Beta**		Broward College	Davie	Florida	Eastern	Active	
Epsilon Gamma						Inactive	
Epsilon Delta						Inactive	
Epsilon Epsilon						Inactive	
Epsilon Zeta						Inactive	
Epsilon Eta						Inactive	
Epsilon Theta						Inactive	
Epsilon Iota						Inactive	
Epsilon Kappa						Inactive	
**Epsilon Lambda**	2022	Seattle Central College	Seattle	Washington	Western		

== See also ==
- Honor society
- Professional fraternities and sororities
- List of dental schools in the United States
- List of defunct dental schools in the United States
