= List of Psi Omega chapters =

Psi Omega fraternity is a professional fraternity for dentistry. Chapters listed by order of usage by the fraternity and date of founding where known; naming was not strictly by order of the Greek alphabet due to the timing of installation ceremonies, reuse of names and local preference.

== Collegiate chapters ==
The collegiate chapters of Psi Omega include the following, with active chapters noted in bold and inactive chapters and institutions in italics.

| Chapter | Charter date and range | Institution | Location | Status | Ref. |
|---|---|---|---|---|---|
| **Alpha** (see also Phi Alpha) | June 8, 1892 – 1924; 19xx ? | University of Maryland School of Dentistry | Baltimore, Maryland | Active | (Note: Chapter formed at the Baltimore College of Dental Surgery, now the University of Maryland School of Dentistry.) (Note: Phi chapter merged into Alpha chapter when their institutions merged. For a time the combined entity was called Phi-Alpha chapter. Alpha chapter was reformed after Phi-Alpha went inactive.) |
| Beta | 1893 | New York University College of Dentistry | New York City, New York | Inactive | |
| Gamma (see **Zeta**) | 1894–1910 | Pennsylvania College of Dental Surgery | Philadelphia, Pennsylvania | Consolidated | (Note: Gamma chapter merged into Zeta chapter when Penn Dental College consolidated its assets into the more stable University of Pennsylvania School of Dental Medicine.) |
| Delta | 1895–1938, 1941–1964 | Tufts University School of Dental Medicine | Boston, Massachusetts | Inactive | |
| **Epsilon** | 1896 | Case School of Dental Medicine | Cleveland, Ohio | Active | (Note: Chapter formed at the Dental Department of Western Reserve University, now Case School of Dental Medicine.) |
| **Zeta** | 1896 | University of Pennsylvania School of Dental Medicine | Philadelphia, Pennsylvania | Active | |
| Eta | 1896 | Maurice H. Kornberg School of Dentistry | Philadelphia, Pennsylvania | Inactive | |
| Theta | 1901–1912 | State University of New York at Buffalo School of Dental Medicine | Buffalo, New York | Inactive | |
| Iota | 1896–2001 | Northwestern University Dental School | Chicago, Illinois | Inactive | (Note: The chapter went inactive when the dental school at Northwestern University closed in 2001.) |
| Kappa | 1896–1993 | Loyola University Chicago Dental School | Chicago, Illinois | Inactive | (Note: The dental school at Loyola of Chicago closed in 1993.) |
| Lambda (see **Zeta Kappa**) | 1896–1903 | University of Minnesota School of Dentistry | Minneapolis, Minnesota | Reestablished | (Note: Lambda chapter closed due to low enrollment. It was re-established as the Zeta Kappa chapter in 1918.) |
| Mu | 1897–1932 | Denver Dental School | Denver, Colorado | Inactive | (Note: Chapter went inactive with the closure of the dental school.) |
| Nu | 1897 | University of Pittsburgh School of Dental Medicine | Pittsburgh, Pennsylvania | Inactive | |
| **Xi** (see Delta Tau) | 1897 | Marquette University School of Dentistry | Milwaukee, Wisconsin | Active | (Note: Baird's Manual (20th ed.) notes that the Delta Tau chapter at Wisconsin's P & S (became Marquette University) was merged into Psi chapter at Starling Ohio Medical (became Ohio State) when the institutions were consolidated. This appears to be an error in that book. Clearly, Psi was meant to be Xi, and that correction is reflected here.) |
| Mu Delta | 1897–1965 | Harvard School of Dental Medicine | Cambridge, Massachusetts | Inactive | |
| Omicron (First) (see **Omicron Second**) | 1897–1918 | Louisville College of Dentistry | Louisville, Kentucky | Moved | (Note: Omicron First formed at the Central University of Kentucky's Louisville College of Dentistry. Central University merged with Centre College in 1901. In 1918, its dental school merged with the University of Louisville and the chapter moved to the new institution.) |
| Pi (see Phi) | 1898–1913 | Baltimore Medical | Baltimore, Maryland | Consolidated | (Note: Pi chapter merged into Phi chapter in 1913.) |
| Beta Sigma | 1898 | University of the Pacific Arthur A. Dugoni School of Dentistry | San Francisco, California | Inactive | |
| Rho | 1899–1926 | Ohio College of Dental Surgery | Cincinnati, Ohio | Inactive | (Note: The chapter went inactive when the college closed in 1926.) |
| Sigma (First) (see **Zeta**) | 1899–1917 | Medico-Chirurgical College of Philadelphia | Philadelphia, Pennsylvania | Consolidated, Reassigned | (Note: The chapter consolidated with the Zeta chapter when the Medico-Chirurgical College of Philadelphia was absorbed by UPenn in 1916.) |
| Tau (see Gamma Tau) | 1900–1918 | Atlanta Dental | Atlanta, Georgia | Consolidated | (Note: Tau chapter merged with Gamma Iota chapter to form Gamma Tau chapter.) |
| **Upsilon** | 1900 | Herman Ostrow School of Dentistry of USC | Los Angeles, California | Active | |
| Phi (see Phi Alpha) | 1900–1924 | University of Maryland School of Dentistry | Baltimore, Maryland | Consolidated | |
| Chi | 1900 | Oregon Health & Science University School of Dentistry | Portland, Oregon | Inactive | |
| **Psi** | 1901 | Ohio State University College of Dentistry | Columbus, Ohio | Active | |
| Omega | 1903–19xx ? | Indiana University School of Dentistry | Indianapolis, Indiana | Inactive | |
| Beta Alpha | 1903 | University of Illinois at Chicago College of Dentistry | Chicago, Illinois | Inactive | |
| Beta Gamma (see Beta Theta) | 1903–1919 | George Washington University | Washington, D.C. | Consolidated | (Note: Beta Gamma chapter merged with Beta Theta chapter in 1919.) |
| **Beta Delta** | 1903 | University of California, San Francisco | San Francisco, California | Active | |
| Beta Epsilon (see Delta Omega) | 1903–1926 | New Orleans Dentistry | New Orleans, Louisiana | Consolidated | (Note: Beta Epsilon chapter merged with Delta Omega chapter in 1926.) |
| Beta Zeta | 1903–1991 | Washington University School of Dental Medicine | St. Louis, Missouri | Inactive | (Note: Gamma Pi chapter consolidated into Beta Zeta chapter in 1912.) (Note: Washington University closed its dental school in 1991.) |
| Beta Eta | 1904–1909 | Keokuk Dental College | Keokuk, Iowa | Inactive | |
| Beta Theta | 1904–1990 | Georgetown University | Washington, D.C. | Inactive | |
| Gamma Iota (see Gamma Tau) | October 25, 1904 – 1918 | Atlanta-Southern Dental College | Atlanta, Georgia | Consolidated | |
| Gamma Kappa | November 17, 1905 – 1936; 1958–19xx ? | University of Michigan | Ann Arbor, Michigan | Inactive | |
| Gamma Lambda | April 17, 1906 – c. 1923 | New York College of Dental and Oral Surgery | New York City, New York | Inactive | (Note: In 1923, the New York College of Dentistry merged with the New York College of Dental and Oral Surgery to form the present School of Dental and Oral Surgery of Columbia University.) |
| Gamma Mu | April 30, 1906 – 20xx ? | University of Iowa College of Dentistry | Iowa City, Iowa | Inactive | |
| Gamma Nu | November 26, 1906 – 1926 | Vanderbilt University Dental School | Nashville, Tennessee | Inactive | (Note: Chapter went inactive when Vanderbilt's dentistry school ceased operations in 1926.) |
| Gamma Xi (see **Gamma Omicron**) | 1907–1913 | University College of Medicine | Richmond, Virginia | Consolidated | (Note: Gamma Xi chapter merged with Gamma Omicron chapter in 1913.) |
| **Gamma Omicron** | 1908 | VCU Medical Center | Richmond, Virginia | Active | |
| Gamma Pi (see Beta Zeta) | 1909–1912 | Washington University School of Dental Medicine | St. Louis, Missouri | Inactive | |
| Delta Rho (see **Phi Rho**) | 1910–1920 | Kansas City Dental College | Kansas City, Missouri | Consolidated | (Note: When the Kansas City Dental College merged with the Western Dental College to form the Kansas City-Western Dental College, the Delta Rho chapter and the Delta Phi chapter merged to form the Phi Rho chapter.) |
| Delta Tau (see **Xi**) | 1912–1912 | Wisconsin College of Physicians and Surgeons | Madison, Wisconsin | Schools merged | |
| **Delta Upsilon** | 1913 | UTHealth School of Dentistry | Houston, Texas | Active | (Note: Chapter formed at the University of Texas Dental Branch at Houston, now called UTHealth School of Dentistry.) |
| Delta Phi (see **Phi Rho**) | 1914–1920 | Western Dental College | Kansas City, Missouri | Consolidated | |
| Gamma Tau | 1918–1988 | Emory University Dental School | Atlanta, Georgia | Inactive | (Note: Chapter closed when Emory University closed its dental school in 1988.) |
| **Zeta Kappa** (see Lambda) | 1918 | University of Minnesota School of Dentistry | Minneapolis, Minnesota | Active | (Note: This was a reestablished of the defunct Lambda chapter.) |
| **Omicron (Second)** (see Omicron First) | 1918 | University of Louisville | Louisville, Kentucky | Active | |
| Delta Chi | 1919–19xx ? | Royal College of Dental Surgeons of Ontario | Toronto, Ontario, Canada | Inactive | |
| **Delta Psi** | December 7, 1920 | Texas A&M University School of Dentistry | Dallas, Texas | Active | |
| **Phi Rho** | 1920 | University of Missouri–Kansas City School of Dentistry | Kansas City, Missouri | Active | |
| Delta Omega | 1921–1970 | Loyola University New Orleans Dental School | Baton Rouge, Louisiana | Inactive | (Note: Beta Epsilon) (Note: Chapter closed when Loyola New Orleans ceased its dental program in 1970.) |
| Psi Alpha | 1921–1935 | Creighton University | Omaha, Nebraska | Inactive | |
| Psi Beta | 1921–1930 | McGill University Faculty of Dentistry | Montreal, Quebec, Canada | Inactive | |
| Phi Alpha | 1924–1939 | University of Maryland School of Dentistry | Baltimore, Maryland | Inactive | |
| **Psi Gamma** | 1926 | University of Tennessee College of Dentistry | Memphis, Tennessee | Active | |
| Psi Delta | 1929–1932 | Dalhousie University Faculty of Dentistry | Halifax, Nova Scotia, Canada | Inactive | |
| Delta Mu | 1939–20xx ? | University of Detroit Mercy School of Dentistry | Detroit, Michigan | Inactive | |
| Theta Xi | 1947–19xx ? | University of Washington School of Dentistry | Seattle, Washington | Inactive | |
| Chi Tau | February 13, 1951 | UAB School of Dentistry | Birmingham, Alabama | Inactive | |
| Chi Upsilon | 1951 | UNC Adams School of Dentistry | Chapel Hill, North Carolina | Inactive | |
| Sigma Eta | 1958 | Rutgers School of Dental Medicine | Newark, New Jersey | Inactive | (Note: Chapter formed at the New Jersey Medicine and Dentistry, now Rutgers School of Dental Medicine.) |
| Sigma (Second) | 1962 | West Virginia University School of Dentistry | Morgantown, West Virginia | Inactive | |
| **Sigma Chi** | April 6, 1973 | Medical University of South Carolina College of Dental Medicine | Charleston, South Carolina | Active | |
| Sigma Alpha | 1974 | Dental School at the University of Texas Health Science Center at San Antonio | San Antonio, Texas | Inactive | |
| **Gamma Gamma** | 1975 | University of Florida College of Dentistry | Gainesville, Florida | Active | |
| **Sigma Iota** | 1980? | Southern Illinois University School of Dental Medicine | Alton, Illinois | Active | |
| **Nu Sigma** | 1997 ? | Nova Southeastern University College of Dental Medicine | Fort Lauderdale, Florida | Active | |
| **Upsilon Nu** | October 13, 2006 | UNLV School of Dental Medicine | Las Vegas, Nevada | Active | |
| **Lambda Alpha** | 2024 ? | UCLA School of Dentistry | Los Angeles, California | Active | |

== Alumni chapters ==
The alumni chapters of Psi Omega are as follows, with active chapters indicated in bold and inactive chapters in italics.

| Chapter | Charter date and range | Location | Province | Status | Ref. |
|---|---|---|---|---|---|
| **Alabama State Alumni** | | Birmingham, Alabama | Province 4: Southeast | Active | |
| **Arkansas State Alumni** | | Hot Springs, Arkansas | Province 2: South | Active | |
| **Baltimore-Oriole Alumni** | | Baltimore, Maryland | Province 5: Northeast | Active | |
| Boston Alumni | | Boston, Massachusetts | Province 5: Northeast | Inactive | |
| Buffalo Alumni | March 26, 1907 | Buffalo, New York | Province 5: Northeast | Inactive | |
| **Chicago Alumni** | | Chicago, Illinois | Province 3: Midwest | Active | |
| **Cleveland Alumni** | February 7, 1905 | Cleveland, Ohio | Province 3: Midwest | Active | |
| **Columbus Alumni** | | Columbus, Ohio | Province 3: Midwest | Active | |
| Connecticut State Alumni | | Connecticut | Province 5: Northeast | Inactive | |
| **Detroit Alumni** | | Detroit, Michigan | Province 3: Midwest | Active | |
| **Duquesne-Pittsburgh Alumni** | | Pittsburgh, Pennsylvania | Province 5: Northeast | Active | |
| **Georgia State Alumni** | | Atlanta, Georgia | Province 4: Southeast | Active | |
| **Houston Alumni** | | Houston, Texas | Province 2: South | Active | |
| **Illinois Kappa Chapter Alumni Association** | | Chicago, Illinois | Province 3: Midwest | Active | |
| **Indiana Alumni** | | Indianapolis, Indiana | Province 3: Midwest | Active | |
| Iowa State Alumni | | Iowa City, Iowa | Province 3: Midwest | Inactive | |
| **Minnesota Alumni** | | Minneapolis, Minnesota | Province 3: Midwest | Active | |
| **Milwaukee Alumni** | | Milwaukee, Wisconsin | Province 3: Midwest | Active | |
| New Jersey State Alumni | | Newark, New Jersey | Province 5: Northeast | Inactive | |
| **New Orleans Alumni** | | New Orleans, Louisiana | Province 2: South | Active | |
| New York Alumni | | New York City, New York | Province 5: Northeast | Inactive | |
| **North Carolina State Alumni** | | High Point, North Carolina | Province 4: Southeast | Active | |
| **Ohio State Alumni** | | Columbus, Ohio | Province 3: Midwest | Active | |
| **Oregon Alumni** | | Portland, Oregon | Province 1: Western | Active | |
| Philadelphia Alumni | | Philadelphia, Pennsylvania | Province 5: Northeast | Inactive | |
| Portsmouth Alumni | November 14, 1905 | Portsmouth, Ohio | Province 3: Midwest | Inactive | |
| San Francisco Alumni | | San Francisco, California | Province 1: Western | Inactive | |
| **Seattle-Sealth Alumni** | December 31, 1904 | Seattle, Washington | Province 1: Western | Active | |
| **South Carolina Alumni** | | Charleston, South Carolina | Province 4: Southeast | Active | |
| **Southern California Alumni** | | Los Angeles, California | Province 1: Western | Active | |
| **Tacoma Alumni** | | Tacoma, Washington | Province 1: Western | Active | |
| **Washington D.C. Alumni** | | Washington, D.C. | Province 5: Northeast | Active | |
| **West Virginia Stage Alumni** | | Wheeling, West Virginia | Province 5: Northeast | Active | |
