= Alpha Zeta Gamma =

American Jewish dental fraternity (1910–1932)

- ΑΖΓ
- Founded: October 1, 1910; 116 years ago Chicago College of Dental Surgery
- Type: Professional
- Affiliation: Independent
- Status: Merged
- Merge date: September 17, 1932
- Successor: Alpha Omega
- Emphasis: Dentistry
- Scope: North America
- Chapters: 15+
- Members: 1,721 lifetime
- Headquarters: Chicago, Illinois; United States

Alpha Zeta Gamma Dental Fraternity (ΑΖΓ) was a North American Jewish professional fraternity for dentistry. It was established in 1910 at the Chicago College of Dental Surgery in Chicago, Illinois. The fraternity merged with Alpha Omega on September 17, 1932.

== History ==
Alpha Zeta Gamma was founded on October 1, 1910 at the Chicago College of Dental Surgery in Chicago, Illinois. It was a professional fraternity for Jewish students of dentistry and claimed to be the first fraternity to require high scholarship and high character. The fraternity's founders were S. J. Ganz, A. Kupperman, Alios D. Newberger, Abe Roth, and M. Schwartz.

Alpha Zeta Gamma's purpose was to promote scholarship, fraternalism, and character and to support dental education at its institutions. It quickly established two additional chapters in Chicago, at the Northwestern University Dental School and University of Illinois Chicago College of Dentistry. Alpha Zeta Gamma was chartered in the State of Illinois on April 21, 1914.

The fraternity grew to include chapters at all leading dental school in the United States, including chapters at Harvard School of Dental Medicine, Baltimore College of Dental Surgery, and the University of Pennsylvania Dental School. It became an international organization with the chartering of a chapter at Dalhousie University Facility of Dentistry in Halifax, Nova Scotia, Canada. Alpha Zeta Gamma also established alumni clubs, including the Illinois Alumni Club, Alpha Zeta Gamma Study Club of Chicago, the Boston Alumni Club, and the New York Alumni Association.

In November 1931, the supreme council of Alpha Zeta Gamma invited Alpha Omega, a similar organization, to meet to discuss a merger. With the merger viewed favorably, Alpha Omega invited representatives of Alpha Zeta Gamma to their 1931 convention in Buffalo, New York. Alpha Zeta Gamma's representatives at the meeting were alumni members Henry Albin, Howard Allen, Harold Gilbert, and L. T. Reif. Terms of the merger were approved at the convention by Alpha Omega and one week later by the supreme council of Alpha Zeta Gamma.

At a January 18, 1932, meeting of the Chicago Dental Society, a joint banquet of Alpha Omega and Alpha Zeta Gamma showed positive sentiment on both sides. On September 17, 1932, the merger contract was signed, making the merger official. On October 7, 1932, the Alpha Zeta Gamma chapters at Chicago College of Dental Surgery (Loyola of Chicago) and Northwestern were installed as chapters of Alpha Omega.

In 1932, Alpha Zeta Gamma had twelve active chapters and 1,721 members.

== Symbols ==
Alpha Zeta Gamma had a membership pin.

== Membership ==
Membership was limited to male dental students who had passed the required freshman courses. Potential members were evaluated based on high standards for both academics and character.

== Governance ==
Alpha Zeta Gamma established a supreme council to oversee its governance.Its top officer was the grand supreme chancellor. Chapter officers included grand master, worthy master, scribe, financial scribe, and treasurer. Alpha Zeta Gamma's 1923 national convention was held at the Drake Hotel in Chicago. Its 1931 convention was also held in Chicago.

At the time of its dissolution, the fraternity's national office was located at 55 East Washington in Chicago, Illinois.

== Chapters ==
A fire at the fraternity's national office in 1925 destroyed many of its early records. As a result, its complete chapter roster is unknown. The following are Alpha Zeta Gamma's known chapters as of 1927, with inactive chapters and institutions indicated in italics.

Chapter	Charter date and range	Institution	Location	Status	Ref.
Alpha	October 1, 1910 – September 9, 1932	Chicago College of Dental Surgery	Chicago, Illinois	Merged (ΑΩ)	
Beta	1914 – September 9, 1932	Northwestern University Dental School	Chicago, Illinois	Merged (ΑΩ)	
Gamma	191x ?–19xx ?	University of Illinois Chicago College of Dentistry	Chicago, Illinois	Inactive	
Delta	191219xx ?	Cleveland Dental School	Cleveland, Ohio	Inactive	
Epsilon	19xx ?–19xx ?	Dalhousie University Faculty of Dentistry	Halifax, Nova Scotia, Canada	Inactive	
Theta	1921–c. 1923	Baltimore College of Dental Surgery	Baltimore, Maryland	Inactive	(Note: Baltimore College of Dental Surgery merged with the University of Maryland in 1923.)
Eta	1922–19xx ?	Harvard School of Dental Medicine	Boston, Massachusetts	Inactive	
Kappa	1922–19xx ?	University of Pennsylvania Dental School	Philadelphia, Pennsylvania	Inactive	
Lambda	192x ?–19xx ?	Western Reserve Dental School	Cleveland, Ohio	Inactive	
Mu	1923–19xx ?	University of Pittsburgh Dental School	Pittsburgh, Pennsylvania	Inactive	(Note: Chapter formed from the Pulp Club (local).)
Nu	192x ?–19xx ?	University of Southern California School of Dentistry	Los Angeles, California	Inactive	
Rho	192x ?–19xx ?	University of Michigan School of Dentistry	Ann Arbor, Michigan	Inactive	
Sigma	192x ?–19xx ?	University of Wisconsin	Madison, Wisconsin	Inactive	
Phi	1923–19xx ?	Tufts College of Dental Surgery	Boston, Massachusetts	Inactive	
Psi	192x ?–19xx ?	University of Minnesota School of Dentistry	Minneapolis, Minnesota	Inactive	
	19xx ?–19xx ?	Baltimore College of Dental Surgery	Baltimore, Maryland	Inactive	

== See also ==
- List of Jewish fraternities and sororities
- Professional fraternities and sororities
