= Suicide of Becca Mallekoote =

Formerly unidentified 1991 suicide victim

Becca Mallekoote
- Born: Rebecca Mallekoote
- Died: June 3, 1991 (aged 18); Albuquerque, New Mexico, US
- Cause of death: Suicide by hanging
- Body discovered: June 5, 1991 35.05°N 106.39°W (approximate)
- Other names: Albuquerque Jane Doe; Bernalillo County Jane Doe; Becca Doe; Becca
- Known for: Former unidentified decedent

Rebecca "Becca" Mallekoote was a formerly unidentified woman who was found hanging from a Super 8 shower in Albuquerque, New Mexico, on June 5, 1991. Her case is most known for her going unidentified for 34 years despite a photograph depicting her alive being found at the scene. She was known as the Albuquerque Jane Doe and Bernalillo County Jane Doe while unidentified.

In 2021, investigators received a tip that said the woman's name was Becca and she may have been from Los Angeles, California. From then on, she was nicknamed Becca Doe or simply Becca. In March 2026, genetic genealogy and a DNA sample taken from her half-brother identified her as 18-year-old Becca Mallekoote.

== Background ==
Becca Mallekoote was born in Tacoma, Washington. At some point, her parents divorced and Mallekoote stayed with her mother. Her mother remarried and the family relocated to California. In 1991, Becca resided in Los Angeles, California. Mallekoote was living in a halfway house for multiple years leading up to her death due to problems at home. She had told a friend that her stepfather had sexually abused her and she did not like being around her family. At the time of her death, she had grown out of the system and was struggling with drugs and alcohol; she was therefore in the process of getting kicked out of the halfway house.

Mallekoote dated a man named George Martinez for several weeks nearing the time of her death. At some point the two took a polaroid picture together, which was found with her when she died and would be widely distributed in an attempt to find her identity. After the two broke up, they remained friends. The brother-in-law of Mallekoote's ex-boyfriend, Albuquerque resident Eduardo Colin, developed feelings for her and Mallekoote, who was looking for a new place to live, wanted to move in with him. Colin, with Martinez’s consent, agreed to fly her out to meet him. The last time Mallekoote was seen alive was when her ex dropped her off at Los Angeles International Airport.

== Discovery ==
On June 3, 1991, between 9:30 PM and 11 PM, Colin arrived at a Super 8 motel in Albuquerque, New Mexico. He rented Room 233 for two people for one night and was expected to check out at 11 AM the following day. Colin was alone when he checked in and provided legitimate information except for a false license plate number.

Two days later, on June 5, staff noticed that Colin had failed to check out of his room and a security guard was sent to investigate. He found a "do not disturb" sign on the doorknob and had to use a screwdriver to get inside. When he entered the bathroom, he found a woman hanging from the showerhead using a suitcase strap. Due to the heat, her body was severely decomposed when found. Colin was also nowhere to be found, and the woman was not seen entering the room or accompanying Colin at any point.

== Postmortem examination ==
A postmortem examination revealed that the woman had heroin in her system and was believed to have died on June 3, the same day Colin rented the room. Although her death was initially investigated as a homicide due to the mysterious circumstances leading up to her dying in the room, there were no signs of forced entry, no signs of a struggle on her body, and nothing being stolen from the two, and her death was officially ruled a suicide.

While unidentified, 16 women were ruled out as being potential identities, including Tiffany Sessions and Kelly McGinnis, with none being matches.

=== Distinguishing characteristics ===
The woman was a white female estimated to have been 25-35 years old, standing at 5'7", and weighing 140lbs. She had curly strawberry blond hair that went to her shoulders and hazel eyes. No distinguishing features such as birthmarks or scars could be found on her body. Later DNA testing showed she was possibly of Hispanic descent. No identification was found.

== Investigation ==
Inside of Room 233, multiple possessions of the woman and Colin's were found, including a handbag and suitcase full of women's belongings, bottles of alcohol, and packs of cigarettes. A digital scale was also found on a table with the name "George Martinez" written on it in red. The scale is suspected to have been used to weigh drug packages. Most importantly, a polaroid photograph was found on the same table which depicted the woman alongside a Hispanic male, later found out to be Mallekoote's ex-boyfriend. Investigators believed the photo was taken in a mall photobooth and when showed the picture, the motel employees mistakenly identified the man in the picture of being Colin.

Investigators spent years trying to track down Colin, but by the time Colin's family could finally be located, Colin had already died from natural causes. Colin's family was shown the photograph of the unidentified woman and confirmed he was not the man in the picture but didn't know who the woman was or what relationship he could've had with her.

Despite media coverage, the sharing of the photo depicting her, and an extensive investigation by police and the FBI, her case went cold for another three decades, and the woman was known as the Albuquerque Jane Doe and sometimes the Bernalillo County Jane Doe. Two reconstructions were made in the following decades.

== Identification ==
In March 2021, investigators received an anonymous tip from a man, later proven to be Mallekoote's ex-boyfriend, that the woman may have been named Becca and was possibly from the Reseda or Sylmar areas of Los Angeles, California. The tip also included that she could've possibly flown to Albuquerque from Los Angeles or Burbank. When this was revealed to the public, the police and media started referring to her as Becca Doe. Although all this information coming from someone who was close to her, she could not be positively identified until something conclusive came up.

In December 2025, the New Mexico Office of the Medical Investigator contacted Ramapo College, located in New Jersey, to conduct genetic genealogy on the unidentified woman. In a matter of weeks, they were able to track down a half-brother and stepfather of the decedent living in California. The FBI and Albuquerque Police Department located the stepfather in Ventura, California, who confirmed he had an 18-year-old stepdaughter named Becca Mallekoote who he hadn't seen or heard from since 1991. Detectives followed this lead and contacted the half-brother, who provided his DNA, which quickly confirmed that the decedent was Mallekoote, who had not been reported missing.

On March 4, 2026, on what would've been her 53rd birthday and over 30 years after her discovery, police announced the decedent was identified as Becca Mallekoote and her case was finally closed. However, the circumstances leading to her death, what she and Colin did after she flew to Albuquerque, and why she killed herself remain unknown.

== See also ==
- Lyle Stevik, another formerly unidentified descendant who died by hanging inside of a motel room
- Suicide of Holly Glynn, another formerly unidentified woman who died by suicide
