= Holly Broadbent Sr. =

American orthodontist

- Born: September 27, 1894; Lockport, New York.
- Died: December 23, 1977 (aged 83); Kirtland, Ohio
- Education: Case Western Reserve University
- Known for: Developing cephalometric roentgenography, Cephalometer
- Relatives: Holly Broadbent Jr (son)
- Medical career
- Profession: Dentist
- Institutions: Case Western Reserve University
- Sub-specialties: Orthodontics

Birdsall Holly Broadbent Sr. (27 September 1894 – 23 December 1977) was an American orthodontist who is credited with developing and introducing the technique of cephalometric roentgenography to orthodontics. He also devised the cephalometer, which accurately positions a patient's head with reference to the x-ray source.

== Life ==
Broadbent was born in Lockport, New York, the grandson of inventor Birdsill Holly. His parents were James and Mabel Holly Broadbent. He went to Case Western Reserve University School of Dental Medicine and obtained his dental degree in 1919. He then attended the orthodontic program in the same institution and obtained his master's degree in 1922. He eventually became the Director of Bolton Fund of Western Reserve in 1929. During the 1933 World Fair in Chicago Broadbent displayed the results of his study of facial development which he took from a series of cephalometric records that he took from his patients. In 1948 he became professor in dental facial anatomy at Western Reserve University.

Broadbent married Bernice Mathews in 1921 and had four children, including a son, Holly Broadbent Jr. Broadbent Sr. died in Kirtland, Ohio at the age of 83 and his ashes were buried in a cemetery in Brooklyn Heights.

== Orthodontics ==
Broadbent has been credited with developing the cephalometer along with Dr. Wingate Todd during 1920s. The Cephalometer held a patient's head steady during an x-ray. They published a paper in 1931 called A new X-ray Technique and Its Application to Orthodontia which introduced a technique. This longitudinal study which consisted of cephalometric measurements had 3500 school children aging from birth to adulthood.

He also established a reference point on the skull called Bolton Point.

== Award and recognitions ==
- Honorary Degree from Dublin University, 1960
- Honorary fellow in Dental Surgery at Royal College of Surgeons of England, 1966
- Honorary Doctor of Science from Case Western Reserve University, 1967
- Silver Beaver Award, 1952
- Albert H. Ketcham Award, 1944
- Honorary President of Twelfth International Dental Congress, 1957
