= Dachine Rainer =

American–English writer (1921–2000)

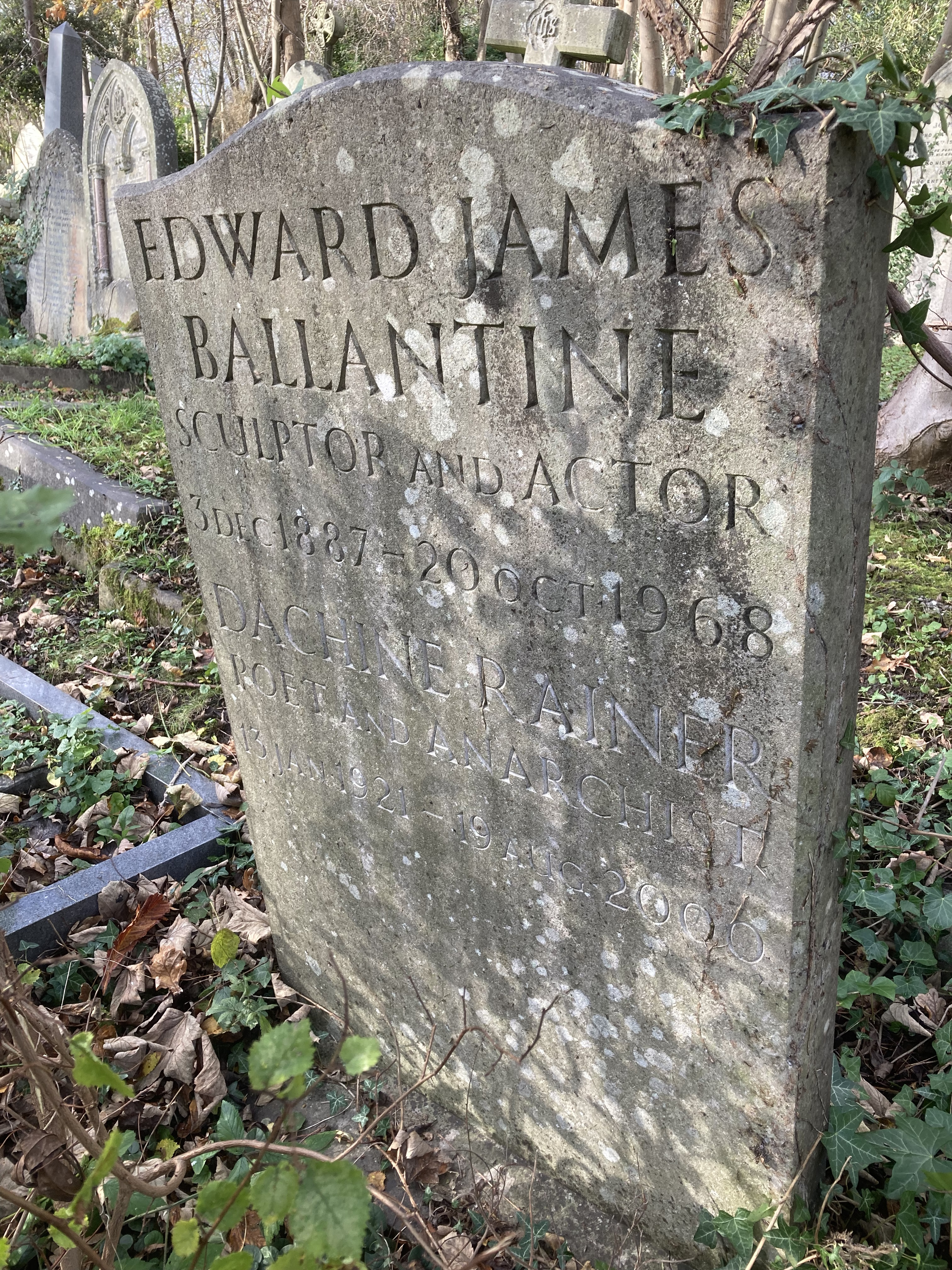
- Rainer's headstone
- Born: Sylvia Newman; 13 January 1921; New York City, New York, US
- Died: 19 August 2000 (aged 79)
- Resting place: Highgate Cemetery
- Partner: Holley Cantine
- Children: Thérèse
- Writing career
- Language: English

Dachine Rainer (born Sylvia Newman; 13 January 1921 – 19 August 2000) was an American-born English writer, poet, and anarchist.

== Life and career ==
Rainer was born in New York and grew up in the Tribeca neighborhood. Her father was a tailor. She was young when the executions of Nicola Sacco and Bartolomeo Vanzetti had taken place, which had influenced her ideologies. Rainer had already become a pacifist and anarchist by the time she was a teenager. In 1938, she had begun writing poetry and prose and won a scholarship to study English literature at Hunter College. In 1944, her first published work, a review, was in the magazine Politics.

=== Personal life ===
In the 1950s Rainer lived with the writer Holley Cantine with whom she had a daughter Thérèse.

=== Legacy ===
Rainer's papers from the years 1948-1971, largely consisting of her correspondence with the photographer Marion Morehouse and her partner E. E. Cummings, are held at the Lilly Library.

== Selected works ==
- Outside Time (1948)
- Giornale de Venezia (Salzburg Studies in English Literature. Poetic Drama & Poetic Theory, 167), 1996 ISBN 3-7052-0964-7
- The Uncomfortable Inn (1960)
