= Birdsill Holly =

19th-century American inventor

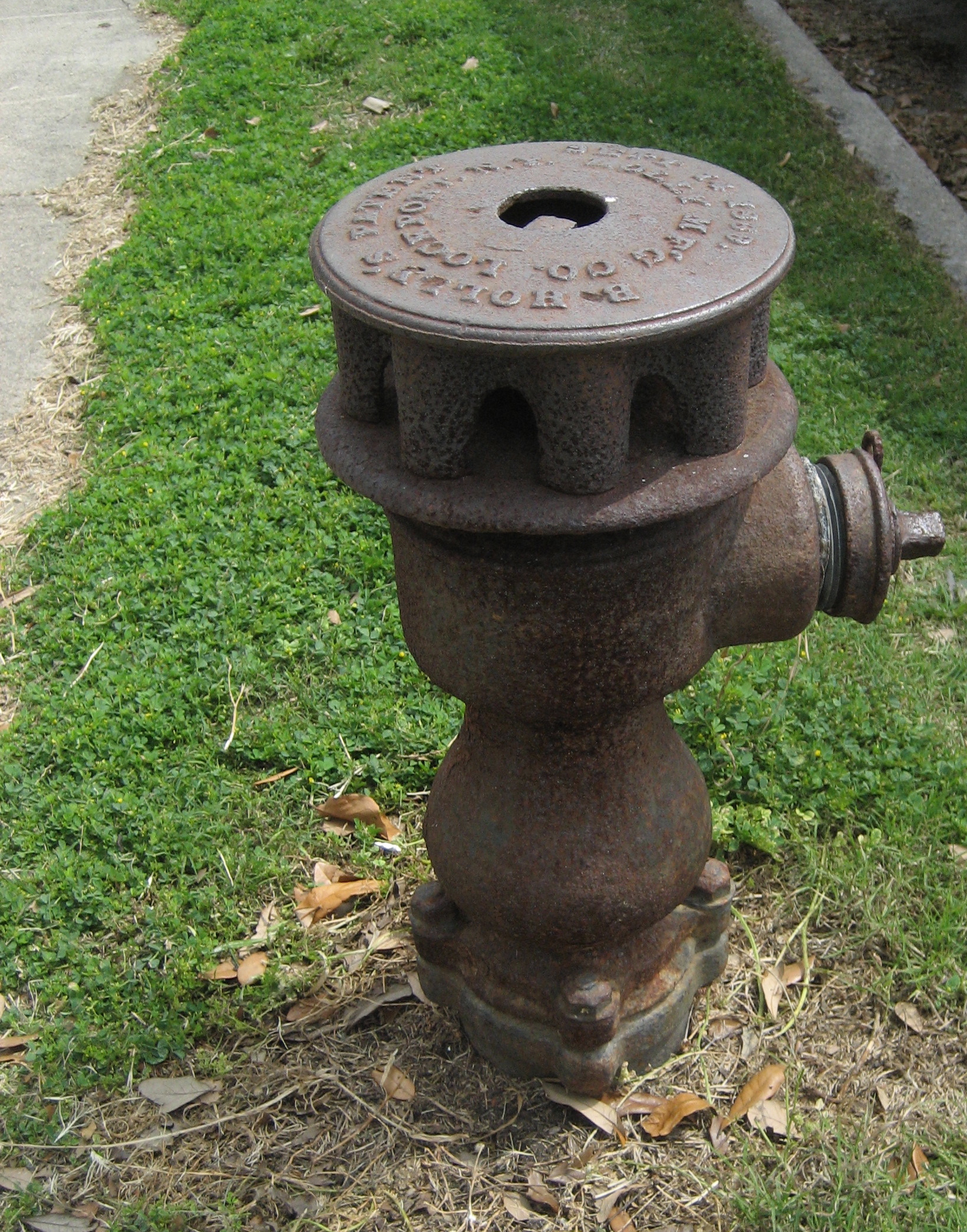
1869 Birdsill Holly fire-hydrant

Birdsill Holly Jr. (November 8, 1820 – April 27, 1894) was an American mechanical engineer and inventor of water hydraulics devices. He is known for inventing mechanical devices that improved city water systems and patented an improved fire hydrant that is similar to those used currently for firefighting. Holly was a co-inventor of the Silsby steam fire engine. He founded the Holly Manufacturing Company that developed into the larger Holly Steam Combination Company that distributed heat from a central station and developed commercial district heating for cities in the United States and Canada.

== Early life ==
Birdsill Holly Jr. was born on November 8, 1820, in Auburn, New York. His father was Birdsill Holly, Sr. and his mother was Comfort (Parker) Holly. When Holly was born his father moved the family to Auburn to join the crew constructing the new prison facility. When the prison was completed, Birdsill Sr. found a job at the Auburn Theological Seminary in construction, after which he tried to farm without much success. The family moved to Seneca Falls, New York, where there was a water-powered industry with many jobs. Holly grew up in the Seneca Falls area, where his father found work as a millwright and general mechanic.

Holly was forced to drop out of school at the age of eight when his father died prematurely at the age of 37; he was only in the third grade before he had to start supporting his family. He was influenced by his father and took an interest in similar trade skills of mechanical engineering. Holly started an apprenticeship in a cabinetry before he trained as a mechanic. In his late teens Holly became a superintendent in the machine trade and later became an owner of a machine shop in Uniontown, Pennsylvania.

== Career ==
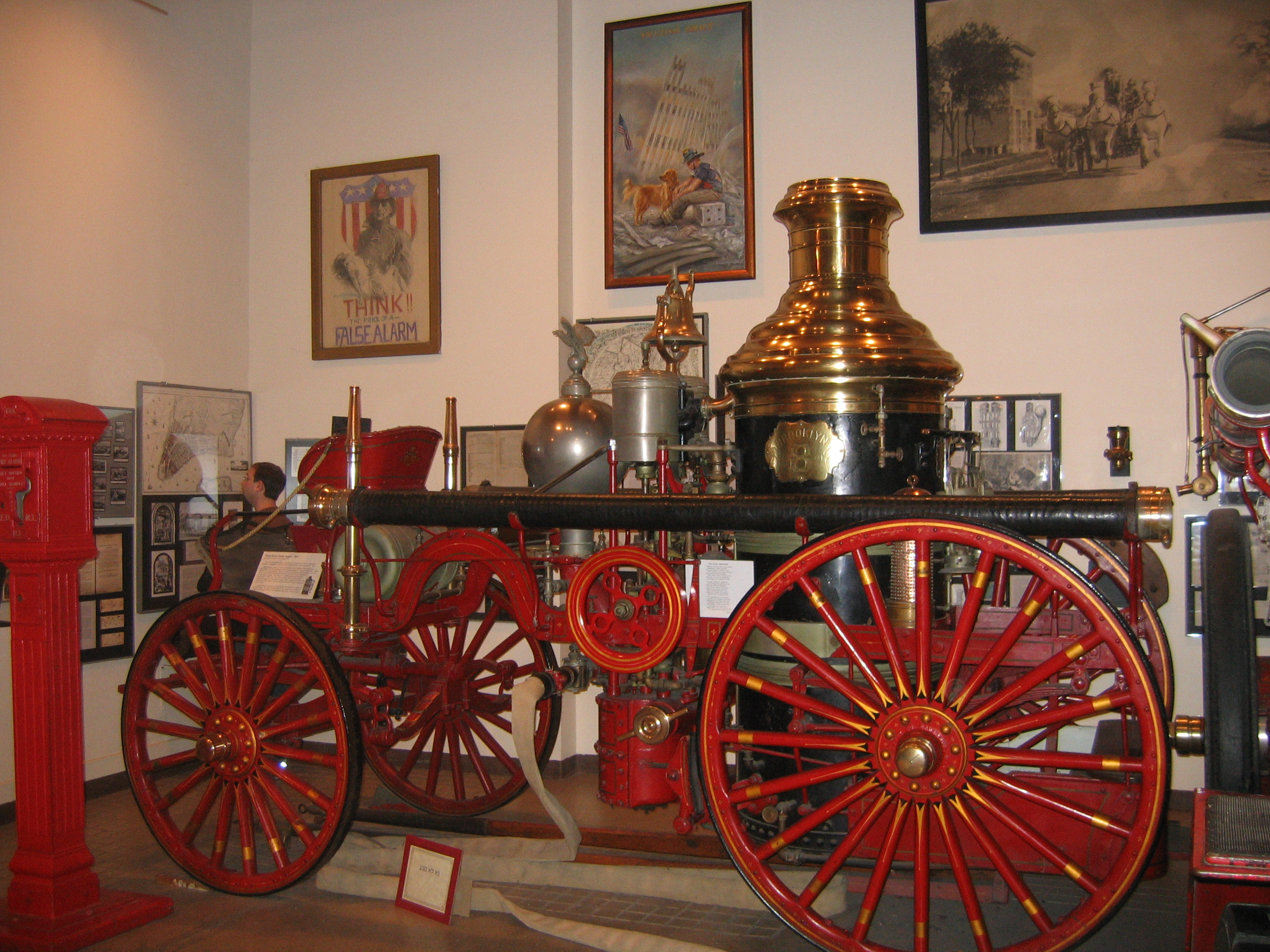
Silsby steam fire engine

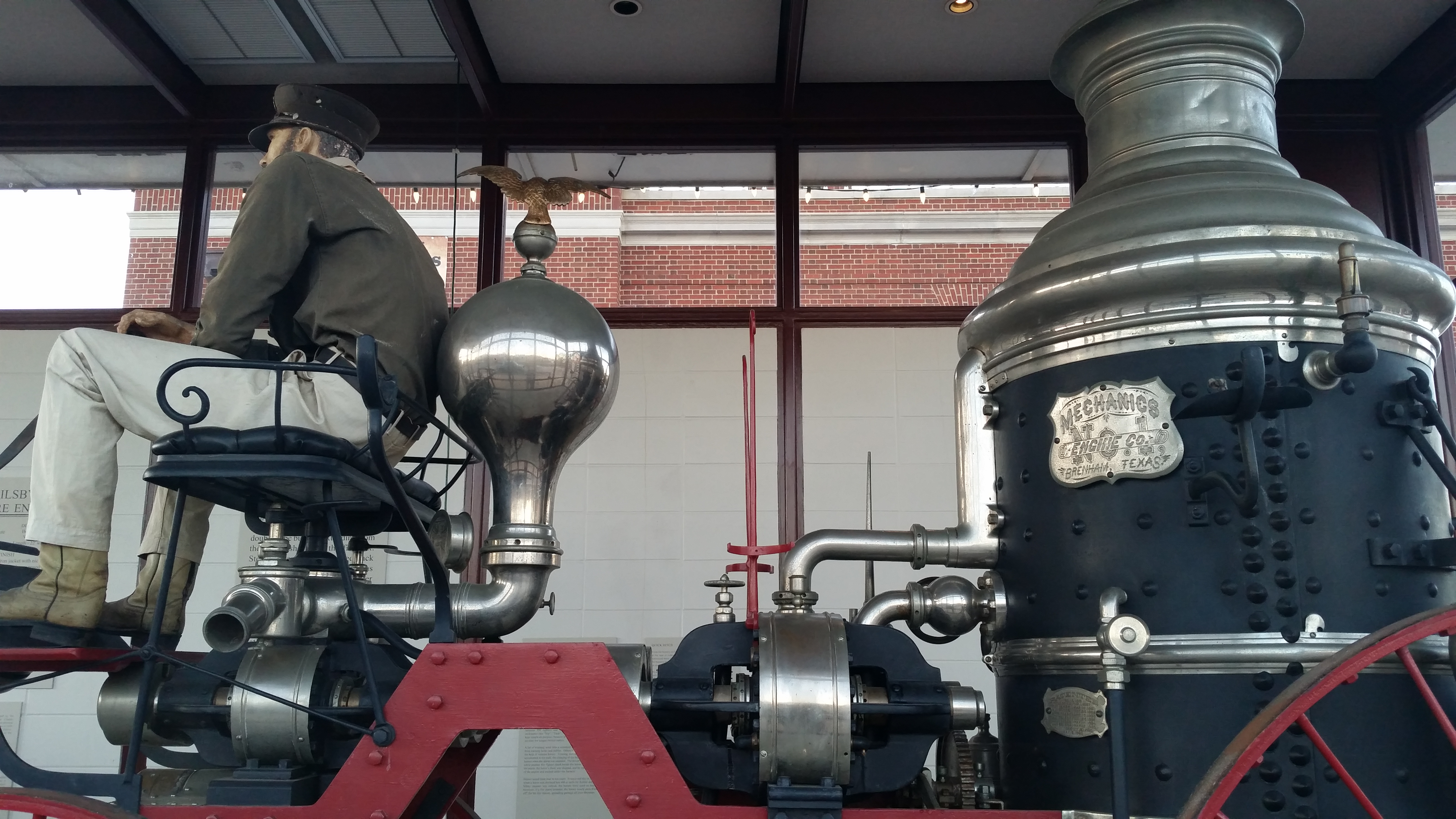
Silsby steam fire engine carriage in Brenham, Texas

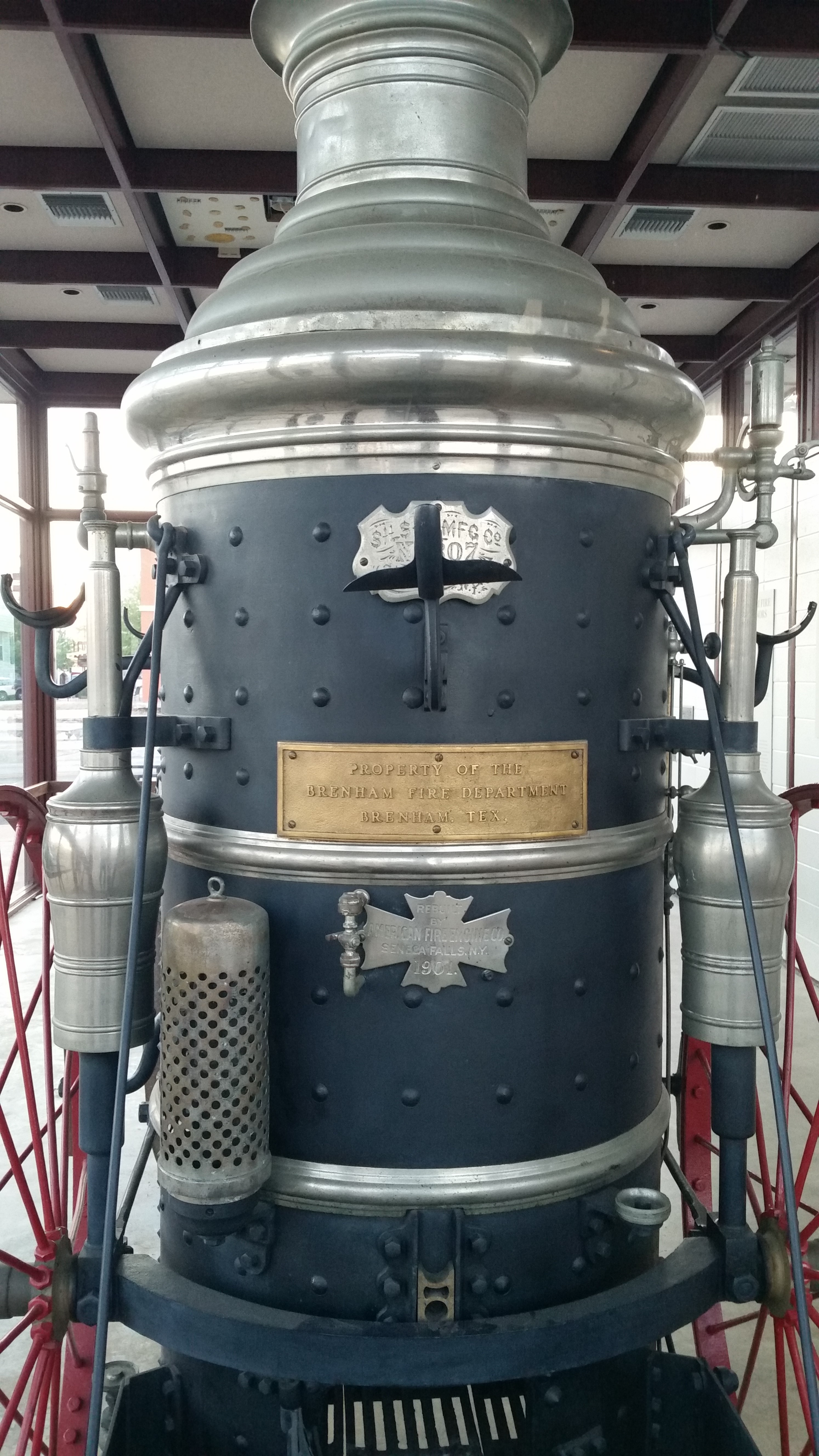
Silsby steam fire engine in Brenham

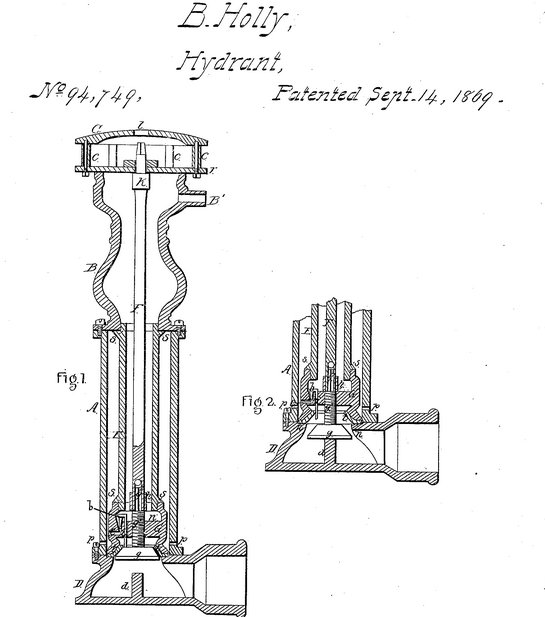
1869 invention US94749 A Birdsill Holly hydrant patent drawings

Holly moved back to Seneca Falls in his early twenties. In 1845 he became one of the partners of a new firm called Silsby, Race and Holly in 1845, which manufactured hydraulic machinery and steam-powered fire engines. As the firm's visionary, Holly contributed significantly to their success. In 1849 he received his first patent, for a rotary water pump.

Holly was a co-inventor of the Silsby steam fire engine, which was first produced in 1856. The unconventional rotary motion steam-cylinder engine and pump were Holly's inventions (US39259A and US12350A). The first of these machines weighed up to 9,500 pounds (4,300 kilograms) and produced 60 pounds (27 kilograms) of steam pressure, enough to propel four streams of water over 200 feet (61 m). The greatest distance recorded for a stream was 364 feet (111 m) on September 24, 1881, in Reading, Pennsylvania. More than 1,000 were made, becoming the most popular steam fire engine built in the United States.

Holly left Seneca Falls in 1851 for Lockport, where in 1859 he established the Holly Manufacturing Company with the financial assistance of politicians Washington Hunt and Thomas Flagler. The company produced sewing machines, cistern pumps, and rotary pumps.

Holly built the Lockport Fire Protection and Water System in 1863, which used pumps powered by water turbines and steam engines to bring water to hydrants in the city. In 1871, his system was adopted by Covington, Kentucky, in 1871. In 1869, he patented a fire hydrant used for fire protection.

Holly's inventions used pressure to pump water directly into the main city water supply lines, since there were no water towers at the time for pressure from a local water supply reservoir for drinking water and fire protection. The pumps ran at various speeds according to usage and was regulated by the pressure in the discharge main. Holly's company facilities doubled when he built a similar system for the city of Lockport water works department. Eventually his water works system equipment was in use in more than two thousand cities in the United States and Canada.

Holly's system of pumping water into Lockport's city mains was unique. It not only supplied drinking water for domestic service, but also stored water under pressure for hydrants in a city fire protection service. His technological innovations provided the impetus for similar city water works construction projects across the United States.

Holly's interests turned from fire protection systems to central heating. He wondered if there was a more efficient way to heat several nearby buildings rather than using individual small boilers in each building. In 1876, he set up an experimental steam heating system at his home in Lockport. Holly ran an underground pipe from his house to a steam boiler 500 feet (150 m) away in the backyard. Through this wooden pipe he ran steam and found that there was little heat loss. He repeated the experiment with a 100-foot pipe to a neighbor's house. The experiment was successful and he convinced others of the possibility of wide-scale central steam heating.

District heating from a central station (click image to see how system works)

Holly formed a company of investors interested in his steam concept of central heating, with a capital of $25,000. He merged the new company with the Holly Manufacturing Company to establish the Holly Steam Combination Company in 1877. Its goals were to commercially distribute heat from a central station and develop district heating for towns and cities in Canada and the United States.

Holly's district heating system used a large boiler at a central plant and provided steam to a group of town buildings in a surrounding city district through a circuit of insulated water pipes that distributed steam and returned it as water after being condensed. The pipes were insulated to reduce heat loss. The serviced buildings were metered with a steam quantity recorder invented by Holly. The consumer was charged for the heat consumed from the steam supply in accordance with coal comparison rates.

Holly designed and invented all the necessary control regulators and measuring devices to run a heating system for a city district. He patented 150 inventions in his lifetime. He was a friend of inventor Thomas Edison, who asked Holly to become an assistant at his research laboratory in Menlo Park. Holly refused, as he wished to concentrate on his own businesses instead.

== Unrealized plans ==
Holly dreamed of constructing a nineteen-story skyscraper. He thought that Niagara Falls would become a tourist attraction someday, so he proposed the idea of building a 700-foot (210 m) structure on Goat Island near the falls for viewing. The plan was never realized due to a lack of finances; he was unable to gather enough investors for such an expensive and highly speculative project. Although Holly's skyscraper was never built, the Skylon Tower, measuring 775 feet (236 m) high from the bottom of the falls, was constructed near the proposed site, beginning in 1964. The concept of similar heights for skyscrapers became popular in New York City shortly before Holly's death in 1894, but did not originate from his architectural designs.

== Personal ==
Holly divorced his wife Elizabeth sometime before 1870; they had married in 1841, and had no children. He married his adopted daughter Sophia, twenty-eight years his junior, with whom he had four children - Mabel Louise (b. 1870), Normal Lewis (b. 1876), Howard (b. 1883), and Edith (b. 1884). The Lockport society shunned the couple, who moved away temporarily in hopes that the scandal would be forgotten.

Holly died in Lockport on April 27, 1894, at the age of 74. He suffered from a chronic illness and the cause of death was listed as heart failure.

One of Holly's grandsons, Holly Broadbent Sr., along with a great-grandson, Holly Broadbent, Jr., contributed to the understanding of craniofacial growth through cephalometric roentgenography as orthodontists at Case Western Reserve University.

== Works ==
The following are some of Holly's 150 patents:

- February 6, 1855 – Elliptical or Rotary pump (US12350 A)
- July 3, 1855 – Method of regulating issue-apertures and of suspending turbine wheels (US13172 A)
- July 14, 1863 – Improvement in pumps (US39259 A)
- November 15, 1864 – Improvement in pumps (US45040 A)
- January 31, 1865 – Hot air furnace (US46107 A)
- September 14, 1869 - Improvement in hydrants (US94749 A)
- November 5, 1872 – Improvement in systems of water-supply for cities (USRE5133 E)
- October 5, 1880 – Steam Heating Radiator (US232821 A)

== Sources ==
- Hager, Willi H. (January 4, 2016). Hydraulicians in the USA 1800–2000: A biographical dictionary of leaders in hydraulic engineering and fluid mechanics. CRC Press. ISBN 978-1-315-68012-5.
- Hinds, Conrade C. (October 9, 2012). The Great Columbus Experiment of 1908: Waterworks that Changed the World. Arcadia Publishing. ISBN 978-1-61423-685-6. "In 1869, Holly was issued US patent #94749 for an improved fire hydrant."
- King, William T. (1896). History of the American steam fire-engine. Pinkham Press. p. 21.
- Purdue (1997). Landmarks in Mechanical Engineering. Purdue University Press. ISBN 978-1-55753-093-6.
- Rogers, Dave (January 6, 2010). Inventions and Their Inventors. M-Y Books Distribution. ISBN 978-1-906986-58-2.
- ScrantonPub (1920). Water and Sewage Works. Scranton Publishing Company. "The Holly system, as all know, consisted of pumping directly into the mains without the intervention of standpipes or reservoirs, the pumps running at a widely varying speed according to consumption. The Holly system gave the initial impetus to water works construction in the early years following the Civil War, and soon had many imitators. The essence of the system was an automatic pump regulator actuated by the pressure in the discharge main."
- Wiley, Samuel T (1892). Biographical and Portrait Cyclopedia of Niagara County, New York. Gresham Publishing Company.
