= Willi H. Hager =

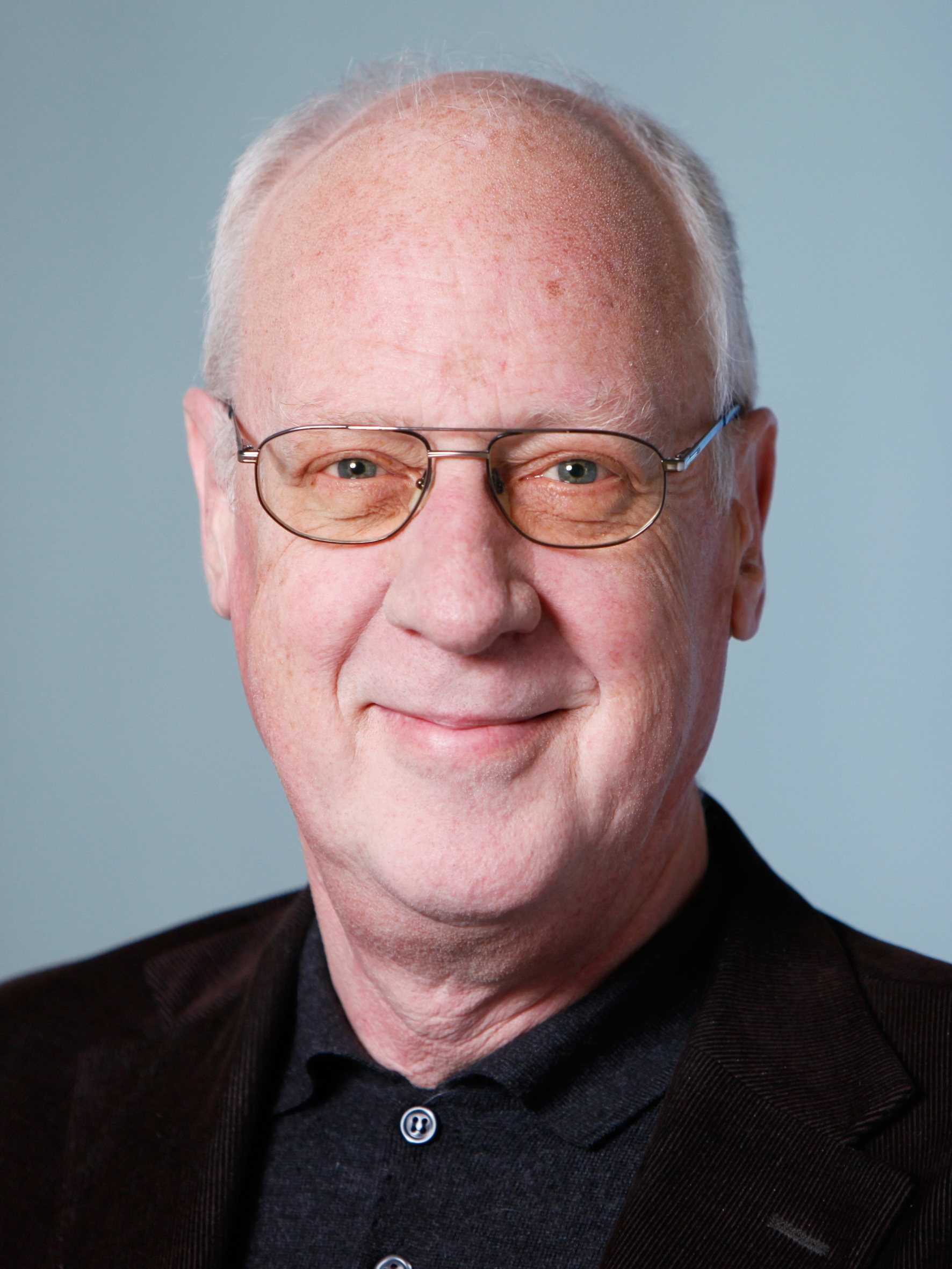
Willi H. Hager (2011)

Willi H. Hager (born July 8, 1951 in Uznach) is a Swiss civil engineer and Professor at the ETH Zurich, Department of Civil, Environmental and Geomatic Engineering, known for his work on hydraulics.

== Biography ==
Born in 1951, Hager obtained his engineering degree from the ETH Zurich in 1976, were in 1981 he also obtained his PhD at its VAW Laboratory of Hydraulics, Hydrology and Glaciology.

Hager had started his career in industry in engineering. In 1981 he joined the Swiss Federal Institute of Lausanne (EPFL), where he was appointed scientific collaborator of Chair of Hydraulic Constructions. In 1989 he returned to the ETH Zurich, where he was appointed Professor and chaired the scientific staff of the VAW Laboratory of Hydraulics, Hydrology and Glaciology.

Among others in 1988 Hager received the J.C. Stevens Award by the American Society of Civil Engineers, and in 1997 he received the Ippen Award by the International Association for Hydraulic Research (IAHR).

== Selected publications ==
- Vischer, Daniel, Willi H. Hager, and D. Cischer. Dam hydraulics. No. 978-0. Chichester, UK: Wiley, 1998.
- Hager, Willi H. Energy dissipators and hydraulic jump. Vol. 8. Springer Science & Business Media, 2013.
- Willi H. Hager. Hydraulicians in Europe 1800-2000. 2 Volumes, 2014.

Articles, a selection

- Hager, Willi H. "Lateral outflow over side weirs." Journal of Hydraulic Engineering 113.4 (1987): 491-504.
- Oliveto, Giuseppe, and Willi H. Hager. "Temporal evolution of clear-water pier and abutment scour." Journal of Hydraulic Engineering 128.9 (2002): 811-820.
- Hager, Willi H. "Losses in flow." Wastewater Hydraulics. Springer Berlin Heidelberg, 2010. 17-54.
