= Holly Maguigan =

American lawyer and academic

- Born: May 29, 1945; Buffalo, New York, U.S.
- Died: November 15, 2023 (aged 78); New York, New York, U.S.
- Occupations: Lawyer, law school professor

Holly Maguigan (May 29, 1945 – November 15, 2023) was an American criminal defense lawyer and professor of law. She was a leader in the legal movement that promotes the self-defense defense in domestic violence cases.

== Early life and education ==
Maguigan was born in Buffalo, New York, and raised in Chester, Virginia, the daughter of Harvey Maguigan and Virginia Smith Maguigan. She earned a bachelor's degree in history from Swarthmore College in 1966, and a master's degree from the University of California, Berkeley, in 1969. She earned her Juris Doctor degree from the University of Pennsylvania in 1972.

== Career ==
Maguigan worked in the public defenders' office in Philadelphia in the early 1970s, then entered private practice. From 1987 to 2021, she was on the faculty at the New York University School of Law. Her 1991 article for the University of Pennsylvania Law Review on domestic violence and self-defense is considered an important data-based argument for the rights of women defendants.

Maguigan was co-president of the Society of American Law Teachers (SALT) in 2004. She served on the boards of MADRE and the William Kunstler Fund for Racial Justice. In 1993, she and other advocates for battered women were honored by the New York City chapter the National Lawyers Guild.

== Publications ==
- "When the DA Bungles a Case" (1987, with Rick Finkelstein)
- "Battered Women and Self-Defense: Myths and Misconceptions in Current Reform Proposals" (1991)
- "Cultural Evidence and Male Violence: Are Feminist and Multiculturalist Reformers on a Collision Course in Criminal Courts?" (1995)
- "Will Prosecutions for Female Genital Mutilation Stop the Practice in the U.S.?" (1998)
- "It's time to move beyond 'Battered woman syndrome'" (1998, review essay)
- "Wading into Professor Schneider's 'Murky Middle Ground' between Acceptance and Rejection of Criminal Justice Responses to Domestic Violence" (2002)
- "US Policy on 'Female Genital Mutilation': Threat of Economic Pressure Internationally, Enactment of Criminal Sanctions at Home" (2002)
- "Explaining without pathologizing: Testimony on battering and its effects" (2005, with Sue Osthoff)

== Personal life ==
Maguigan married twice. She married Thomas Wright in 1969; he died in 1974. She had a daughter, Miranda, with political consultant Paul Tully. She married lawyer Abdeen Jabara in 1997. Maguigan died in 2023, at the age of 78, in New York City.
