= Holly Alex =

Scottish advocate and author

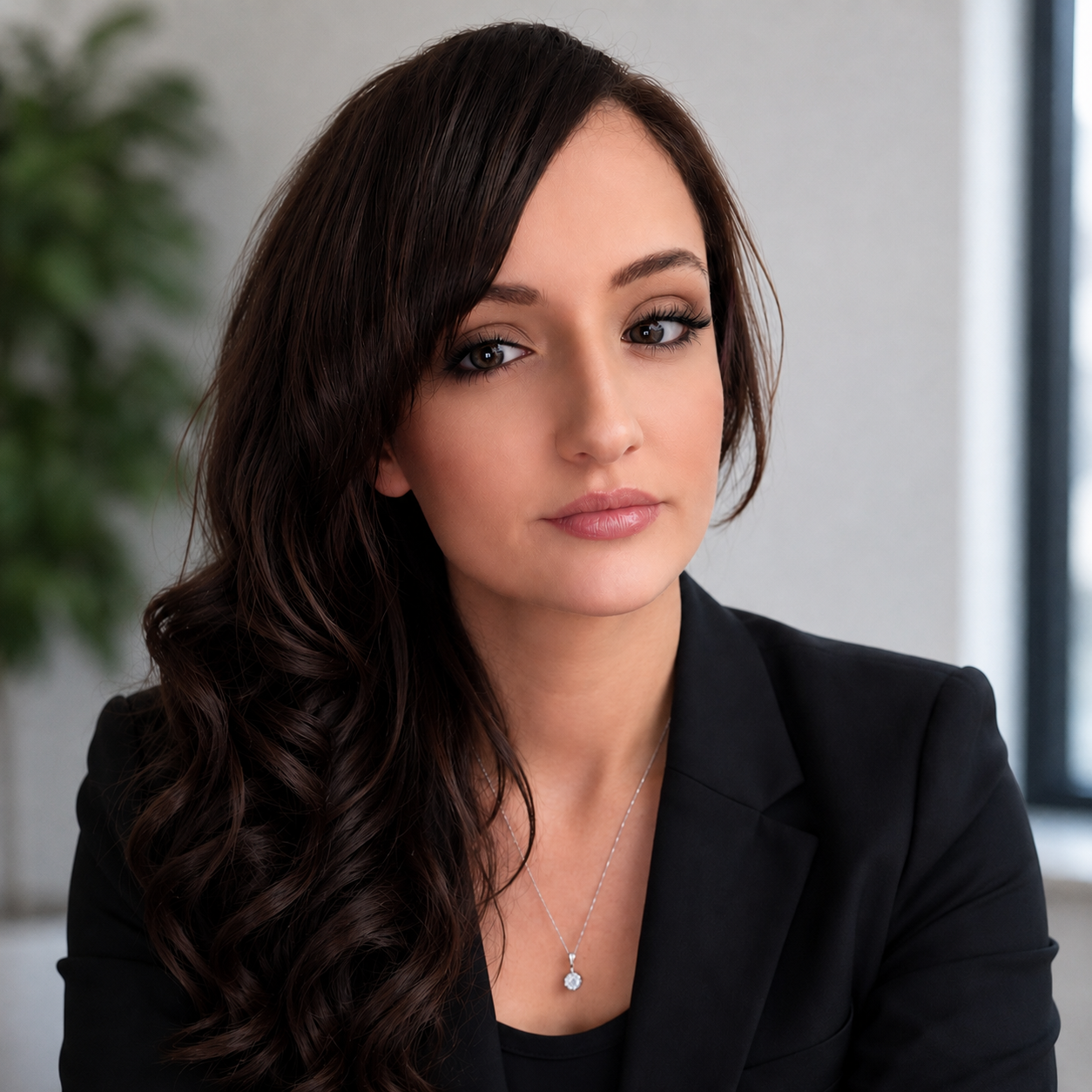
- Holly Alex in 2026
- Born: Holly Hamilton
- Occupations: Author, Advocate, Campaigner
- Known for: Advocacy for care-experienced people; Author of I Thought You Cared

Holly Alex (born Holly Hamilton) is a Scottish writer and advocate who has spoken publicly about her experiences in residential care in Scotland. She has been featured in UK media in connection with reporting on abuse in secure care and its handling by local authorities. She is the author of I Thought You Cared (2026).

== Early life and care experience ==
Holly entered the Scottish residential care system as a teenager. She later spoke to BBC News and other outlets about abuse she experienced while in care, and about systemic failures in the handling of care placements.

== Abuse, advocacy, and public attention ==
While in secure care, Holly was sexually abused by a care worker, Gordon Collins, when she was 15. She has spoken publicly about her experiences in BBC News and other outlets, discussing both the abuse and responses by care authorities.

Following the conviction of Collins, Holly gave interviews to multiple media outlets, including the BBC, Edinburgh Evening News, Herald Scotland, and the Daily Mirror, commenting on care practices and the handling of abuse allegations.

Holly has also spoken publicly about group-based child sexual exploitation in Scotland, describing how young people in care were targeted and raising concerns about safeguarding within the care system. She has called for greater awareness of such exploitation and improved protections for care-experienced young people.

In The Scotsman, her experiences were cited as highlighting wider concerns about safeguarding failures within the care system.

== Publications and advocacy work ==
Holly is the author of I Thought You Cared (2026), a memoir recounting her experiences in residential care, including sexual exploitation and trafficking, and the abuse she suffered while in St Katharine's Secure Unit Edinburgh.

In addition to her memoir, Holly wrote and produced the song My Childhood Is Not My Name, which uses AI-assisted vocals and explores themes of trauma, identity, survival, and recovery within the care system.

Holly also runs Beyond The System, working as a lived experience advocate supporting care-experienced people in navigating the care system, accessing records and files, and obtaining practical and emotional support.
