= Holley Cantine =

American writer and anarchist

- Born: February 14, 1916
- Died: January 2, 1977 (aged 60); Woodstock, New York
- Known for: Retort

Holley R. Cantine Jr. (February 14, 1916 – January 2, 1977) was an American writer and activist best known for publishing the anarchist periodical Retort with Dachine Rainer.

== Life ==
Holley R. Cantine Jr. was born on February 14, 1916, and raised in Woodstock, New York. He came from a wealthy family. His father owned a paper-coating business in Saugerties and his mother was a painter. Cantine's maternal grandfather served as the first president of Panama and later became an ambassador for the United States. Woodstock was a growing, left-wing, artistic community during the time he was raised there. Cantine studied anthropology at Swarthmore College and Columbia University but left before finishing his doctoral dissertation to pursue a self-sufficient life in the woods.

Cantine edited the first issue of Retort, a journal of art and social philosophy, with Dorothy Paul in June 1942 from their small, self-built cabin in Bearsville, New York, near the town where he was raised. Cantine published political writings alongside political poetry and fiction. Retort was an early publisher of writers Kenneth Patchen, Saul Bellow, and Robert Duncan. By 1947, Cantine was editing alongside the anarchist poet Dachine Rainer and Retort has become "An Anarchist Quarterly". Cantine set, printed, and bound the pages by hand. The pair were jailed during World War II as conscientious objectors. They subsequently edited and published a collection of writings from conscientious objectors, Prison Etiquette, in 1950. Retort ceased publication in 1951. Around this time, Cantine had a daughter with Rainer named Thérèse.

Cantine also wrote a weekly periodical, The Wasp, which took antagonistic aim at Woodstock tourists ("trudgers") and the town's commercialization. His 1959 science fiction short story, "Double Double Toil and Trouble", received several awards. Cantine also translated Volin's The Unknown Revolution from French and his own Second Chance: A Story.

Cantine died on January 2, 1977, in a house fire in Woodstock.

== Bibliography ==
- Cornell, Andrew (2011). "A New Anarchism Emerges, 1940–1954". Journal for the Study of Radicalism. 5 (1): 105–131. ISSN 1930-1189. JSTOR 41889949.
- Evers, Alf (1987). Woodstock: History of an American Town. Woodstock, New York: Overlook Press. ISBN 978-0-87951-983-4.
