= Holly B =

Radio and television personality from Trinidad and Tobago

Holly Betaudier (1925 27 January, Arima, Trinidad and Tobago – May 2016, Glencoe, Diego Martin, Trinidad and Tobago) was a radio and television personality from Trinidad and Tobago. He was known as Holly B the Arima Kid for short. He started broadcasting from Chaguaramas during World War II for the US armed forces. He moved to Radio Trinidad then on to Trinidad and Tobago television when it started in 1962 and finally on I95fm He hosted programs like Scouting for Talent, Crix Five with Holly B, Parang with Holly B, Toute Bagai and many more programs.

== Education ==
Holly B had his education at Arima Boys' RC school.
