= Holly Farrar =

American football player and coach

Playing career
- 1894: Otterbein
- Position: Fullback

Coaching career (HC unless noted)
- 1894: Otterbein
- 1895: Ohio Wesleyan

Head coaching record
- Overall: 4–5–1

Holly Farrar was an American football player and coach. He served as a player-coach for Otterbein University in Westerville, Ohio in 1894. He served as the head football coach at Ohio Wesleyan University, along with Oscar Scott, the following year in 1895.
