= Alpha Omega (fraternity) =

American Jewish dental fraternity

- ΑΩ
- Founded: 1907; 119 years ago Baltimore, Maryland
- Type: Professional
- Affiliation: Independent
- Former affiliation: PFA; PIC
- Status: Active
- Scope: International
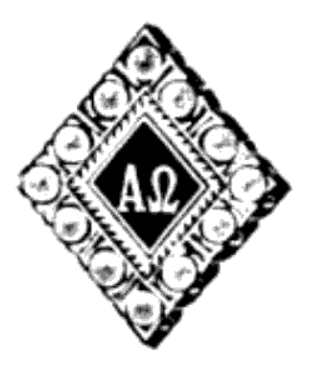
- Member badge
- Colors: Historically Black and Gold
- Flower: Black-eyed Susan
- Publication: Alpha Omegan
- Chapters: 31 dental school 38 alumni
- Members: 50,000 lifetime
- Headquarters: P.O. Box 1332; Syosset, New York 11791; United States
- Website: www.ao.org

Alpha Omega (ΑΩ, sometimes AO), is an international professional Jewish dental fraternity. It was founded in 1907 in Baltimore, Maryland, by Jewish dental students. In 1932, it merged with Alpha Zeta Gamma, a similar organization. It is a former member of the Professional Fraternity Association.

== History ==
=== Ramach ===
In 1907, a group of Jewish students at the Pennsylvania College of Dental Surgery in Philadelphia, Pennsylvania created a professional organization called Ramach.Its name referred to the 248 parts of the human body. (Note: Hebrew numerals use Resh for 200, Mem for 40 and Chet for 8) After the Pennsylvania College of Dental Surgery closed in June 1909, Ramach moved to Medico-Chirurgical College of Philadelphia in October 1909.

=== Alpha Omega ===
In the fall of 1908, Jewish students from three dental schools in Baltimore, Maryland established Alpha Omega, a professional dental fraternity.Under the leadership of Max W. Belzer, the students formed the fraternity because, as Jews, they were not offered admission to other campus fraternities. Alpha Omega Dental Fraternity was chartered in the State of Maryland with sixteen founding members in 1908 or 1909.

Alpha Omega's founders were Max W. Belzer, N. M. Bercovitz, Charles Cohen, S. Feldstein, Abraham Goberman, J. M. Gordon, Max Kahn, D. Levin, L. Levy, Maurice D. Liftig, M. Meyerson, Samuel M. Neistadt, David S. Robinson, William H. Rosenfeld, M. Sholkin, Jacob Solomon, and P. Steiner. Belzer was the fraternity's first president.

After learning about Ramach, Alpha Omega initiated a correspondence with the other fraternity. In 1909, Kahn and Neistadt traveled to Philadelphia to resolved any differences, so that the two groups could merge. Alpha Omega and Ramach merged to form the Alpha Omega Fraternity on December 20, 1909. Its purpose was "to promote the highest ethical standards of the dental profession, further the causes of Judaism and to promote Fraternalism".

Additional chapters were established at the University of Pennsylvania School of Dental Medicine in 1910, Tufts University School of Dental Medicine and New York University College of Dentistry in 1911, followed by the Harvard School of Dental Medicine in 1912. Alpha Omega held its first convention in 1912 in New York City, with forty men in attendance.

Alpha Omega established its first alumni chapter in Philadelphia in 1916. The fraternity became international in 1921 with the formation of a chapter at the Faculty of Dentistry, University of Toronto.

In November 1931, Alpha Zeta Gamma, a similar organization, invited Alpha Omega to send representatives to meet with the Supreme Council of Alpha Zeta Gamma to discuss a merger. With the merger viewed favorably, Alpha Omega invited representatives of Alpha Zeta Gamma to their 1931 convention in Buffalo, New York. Terms of the merger were approved at the convention by Alpha Omega and one week later by the Supreme Council of Alpha Zeta Gamma. At the January 18, 1932 meeting of the Chicago Dental Society, a joint banquet of Alpha Omega and Alpha Zeta Gamma showed positive sentiment on both sides. On September 17, 1932, the merger contract was signed and the merger was official. On October 7, 1932, the Alpha Zeta Gamma chapters at Chicago College of Dental Surgery (Loyola of Chicago) and Northwestern were installed as chapters of Alpha Omega.

In 1942, the fraternity had initiated 5,000 members and had chartered 33 collegiate chapters and 20 alumni clubs.

During World War II, the fraternity donated mobile dental ambulances to the Royal Canadian Dental Corps and the United States Army. With the establishment of Israel after the war, Alpha Omega donated materials, including hospital and field equipment, as well as qualified teachers to help train Israeli personnel. The estimated value of the materials, services, and equipment sent to Europe and Israel exceeded $500,000.

In 1952, the fraternity established the Hebrew University-Hadassah School of Dental Medicine in Jerusalem, Israel, and a chapter was established there in 1958. The fraternity also founded The Tel Aviv University School of Dental Medicine in Tel Aviv, Israel.

In 1962, Alpha Omega had 10,500 initiates and had chartered 44 college chapters and 53 alumni chapters. The fraternity established the Alpha Omega Foundation, incorporated as a nonprofit organization in the State of New York in 1969.

== Symbols ==
Alpha Omega's badge is diamond-shaped with the Greek letters "ΑΩ" in gold on a black enamel background. There is a blue sapphire at the top of the diamond and a white sapphire at the bottom. The rest of the border is outlined by ten pearls. The fraternity also has a pledge pin that is a diamond with black enamel on the top half and gold enamel on the bottom half.

The fraternity's colors are black and gold. Its flower is the Blackeyed Susan. Its publication is the Alpha Omegan.

== Activities ==
Alpha Omega established its Achievement Medal in 1936, presented to an individual or organization for outstanding contributions to dentistry or its allied sciences. Alpha Omega has honored many giants in the field of dentistry and medicine, including Albert Einstein, Jonas Salk, Arno Benedict Luckhardt, Charles Best, William J. Gies, and Thomas Parran. The fraternity also presents the Alpha Omega and Colgate Prize for an outstanding thesis. It also has a tuition loan fund and presents the Alpha Omega Scholarship Award.

Alpha Omega was established and has contributed more than $1.5 million to the Hebrew University-Hadassah School of Dental Medicine in Jerusalem, Israel. In partnership with Henry Schein, the fraternity launched the Alpha Omega Henry Schein Cares Holocaust Survivors Oral Health Program in 2015. In response to the October 7, 2023, attack on Israel, Alpha Omega members donated $110,000 for an ambulance for Magen David Adom and established two dental clinics for displaced residents in Israel.

In 1970, the fraternity helped found the Tel Aviv University School of Dental Medicine in Tel Aviv, Israel, and continues to raise funds to support the school, including helping to raise $3 million in 2012. The fraternity also has an international program for oral health and undertakes activities such as partnering with the Tel Aviv University School of Dental Medicine to provide free dental aid to African refugee children.

== Governance ==
Alpha Omega is governed by an International Board of Directors. The board's Administrative Committee consists of the International President, President-Elect, Treasurer, Secretary, Communications Officer, and a past-president advisor. The International Directors include regional directors for the United States, Canada, and other countries, members-at-large, a young alumni director, student representatives, and the immediate past president. Historically, the fraternity was governed by a national council consisting of a president, secretary, treasurer, editor, historian, and trustees. It is incorporated in the State of Maryland.

== Chapters ==
Alpha Omega has two types of chapters: dental school (student) chapters and alumni chapters. Since its founding, it has chartered more than 75 dental school chapters in the United States, Canada, Israel, Mexico, and South Africa. As of 2026, it lists 31 dental school chapters in four countries and 38 alumni chapters in the United States, Canada, Israel, and Europe.

== See also ==
- List of Jewish fraternities and sororities
- Professional fraternities and sororities
