= Suicide of Holly Glynn =

1987 event in Dana Point, California

Holly Glynn
- High school portrait of Holly Glynn, circa 1984
- Born: Holly Jo Glynn; September 11, 1966
- Died: September 20, 1987 (aged 21); Dana Point, California, US
- Cause of death: Suicide by jumping
- Body discovered: September 20, 1987, at 6:40 a.m. 33.46155°N 117.71134°W (approximate)
- Other names: Dana Point Jane Doe; Jane Doe 87-04457-EL
- Known for: Former unidentified decedent
- Height: 5 ft 4 in (1.63 m)
- Parents: James Glynn (father); Carol Glynn (mother)

Holly Jo Glynn (September 11, 1966 – September 20, 1987) was a formerly unidentified American woman who committed suicide in September 1987 by jumping off a cliff in Dana Point, California. Her body remained unidentified until 2015, when concerns previously expressed by friends of Glynn that the unidentified woman may have been their childhood friend, whom they had been unable to locate for several years, were proven.

Prior to her May 2015 identification, Glynn's body had been informally known as the Dana Point Jane Doe, and officially as Jane Doe 87-04457-EL.

== Discovery ==
At 6:40 a.m. on September 20, 1987, the body of a young Caucasian woman was discovered by joggers at the base of a cliff at Dana Point, California. Her body had no form of identification on her possession, although at the top of the cliff, investigators discovered a half-consumed can of Coca-Cola, a purse containing small change, a pack of cigarettes, matches, and two maps of Southern California. On the rear of one of these maps was written the telephone number of a local taxi firm in addition to other notations she had written, indicating she may have asked several individuals for directions.

=== Distinguishing characteristics ===
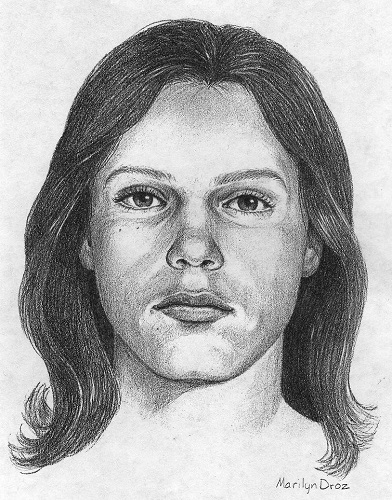
Original facial reconstruction of the Dana Point Jane Doe

An examination of her remains indicated that death had occurred approximately two hours before her body was discovered, and that she was between 18 and 23 years old when she had died. She wore a tan dress, men's underwear and turquoise-colored canvas shoes, all of which were believed to have either been second-hand clothing or hand-me-downs.

The woman had been between 5 feet 3 inches (1.60 m) and 5 feet 8 inches (1.73 m) in height, and weighed 127 pounds (58 kg). She had freckles, and her hair was strawberry-blond or light brown and long, reaching to the middle of her back. Her body had no distinctive tattoos, scarred tissue, or birthmarks, although she did have healed acne marks on her upper back and shoulder. Nonetheless, the woman had pierced ears, and had received several distinctive dental fillings in both her upper and lower jaw.

A further examination of her remains revealed she may have been pregnant or undergone a dilation and curettage procedure at one time during her life, and may have also worn braces in her childhood or adolescence.

== Eyewitness accounts ==
Investigators contacted the taxi firm written on the map found at the top of the cliff from where the woman had either fallen or jumped to her death; they subsequently spoke with a driver who informed them he had provided transportation to a female who matched the description of the decedent sometime between 3 and 4 a.m. on September 20. The woman had asked to be picked up from a Unocal Station in Mission Viejo in southern Orange County, requesting to be driven to Laguna Beach, or as far as the $18 she had in her possession would take her. According to the taxi driver, the woman had informed him that her car had broken down close to the gas station from where he had picked her up, but had otherwise been largely uncommunicative throughout the remainder of her journey in his taxi, although he did note she seemed very unhappy in demeanor. This driver further informed investigators he had dropped the young woman off at the Chart House near the intersection of Cove Road and Scenic Drive, and that he had last seen her walking in the direction of the cliff where her body was later found.

Before entering the taxi, the woman had earlier been seen at the Unocal Station in question, and had used the bathroom at the premises. Investigators would also discover that the woman had earlier entered a nearby Hampton Inn and asked a clerk if there were any "high end hotels" in the area.

=== Further investigation ===
2014 reconstruction of the Dana Point Jane Doe, created by the National Center for Missing & Exploited Children

From all evidence discovered at the scene of the death, investigators believed that the woman had climbed over a fence at the edge of the cliff and jumped to her death. As such, her death was ruled a suicide. Nonetheless, other theories initially remained, including the possibility she may have been pushed from the cliff, or had accidentally fallen. She had initially survived the fall, and had moved somewhat before her death, leaving impressions similar to that of a snow angel. The dead woman would colloquially become known in the press and other media as the Dana Point Jane Doe.

The purse in the Dana Point Jane Doe's possession was embossed with a woman's name: Carol L. Pinkham. Authorities proceeded to trace all women who had this name; all of whom were found to be still alive. One of these women informed investigators that she had had a purse of this description stolen in 1975, 12 years before the case. (Note: Pinkham did not know who had committed the theft, and no person was ever charged with this offense. No evidence exists as to how Glynn came into possession of this purse, or to her committing the theft.)

In efforts to trigger recognition from those who may have seen the victim in life, a composite drawing of the woman was created by a forensic artist from the Orange County Police Department. Despite these efforts, the woman remained unidentified, and her death gradually became a cold case. (Note: The National Center for Missing & Exploited Children would later release a further rendering of Dana Point Jane Doe in 2014.)

== Identification ==
In May 2015, Dana Point Jane Doe was formally identified as Holly Jo Glynn. This formal identification occurred after several high school friends of Holly's from Whittier, having been unable to regain contact with Holly via social media or any other conventional means of contact for several years, reported their suspicions to both the National Missing and Unidentified Persons System (NamUs) and the Doe Network that the Dana Point Jane Doe may actually be Holly Jo Glynn. These efforts to determine whether the Dana Point Jane Doe may have been Holly Jo Glynn were first made in 2011.

In 2014, these friends had contacted Facebook's "Help ID Me" page, again expressing their suspicions. These suspicions were subsequently relayed to authorities in early 2015. (Note: The Facebook "Help ID Me" page is managed by the National Center for Missing & Exploited Children.)

The Orange County Sheriff's Department Coroner Division subsequently contacted surviving relatives of Holly Glynn and obtained DNA samples for formal comparison with the Dana Point Jane Doe. It was eventually announced by Unsolved Mysteries that, via this technique of DNA analysis, the Dana Point Jane Doe had been Holly Jo Glynn.

=== Cremation ===
More than 20 years prior to her identification, Holly Jo Glynn's remains had been cremated in a ceremony costing $425, paid for by Orange County, on her behalf. Her ashes had then been placed in a cardboard box and buried at sea.

== See also ==
- Cold case
- List of solved missing person cases: 1950–1999
- The Doe Network
- Unidentified decedent
