= Holly Broadbent Jr. =

American orthodontist

- Born: September 2, 1928; Cleveland, Ohio
- Died: July 9, 2009 (aged 80); East Hampton, New York
- Education: St. Andrew's School, Princeton University, Yale School of Medicine
- Occupation: orthodontist

Birdsall Holly Broadbent Jr. (September 27, 1928 in Cleveland, Ohio – July 9, 2009 in East Hampton, New York) was an American orthodontist known for his contributions to the field of orthodontics. He co-developed the Bolton Standards along with his grandfather Birdsall Holly II. The work is based on the Broadbent-Bolton Growth study, which the American Association of Orthodontists Foundation has called "the most complete human craniofacial growth study in the world".

== Life ==
Broadbent was born in Cleveland, Ohio. He was son of Ebert B. Broadbent Sr. and great-grandson of Birdsall Holly, a leading inventor in the nineteenth century. He attended St. Andrew's School (Delaware) after which he received his Bachelor's from Princeton University and Dental Degree from the Yale School of Medicine. He married his wife Jacqueline Harriman Fisk (1937-), the granddaughter of W. Averell Harriman, in 1957 and they had two daughters, Meredith Broadbent (who become commissioner at the US International Trade Commission in 2012) and Elizabeth Parsons Broadbent (Becke). After graduation from dental school, Broadbent joined his grandfather's practice as an apprentice in a downtown Cleveland office located in the Keith Building. He was the member of the Case Western Reserve faculty for around 50 years. With him and his father's collaboration, the Bolton-Brush Growth Study Center was established at the Case Western Reserve University School of Dental Medicine whom he served as the director of until his death.

Broadbent is credited with creating the Bolton Standards in 1975 (with William Golden) based on X-rays of 16 boys and 16 girls from ages 1 to 18. His other contributions to the understanding of craniofacial growth include contributing factors to sleep apnea, and the development of the oropharynx.

In 1999, the American Association of Orthodontists Foundation issued the GAC International Corporate Center Award to Broadbent to index and preserve records from the Bolton-Brush and Broadbent-Bolton growth studies. He was the 2005 Distinguished Alumnus of the Year for the Case School of Dental Medicine.

Broadbent died in 2009 at the age of 80 in East Hampton, New York.

== Positions held ==
- Cleveland's Health Museum, President
- Cleveland Dental Society, President
- Great Lakes Society of Orthodontists, President
- American Association of Orthodontists, Vice-President
