= Sigma Phi Alpha =

American honorary society for dental hygiene

- ΣΦΑ
- Founded: May 21, 1958; 68 years ago American Association of Dental Schools, Detroit, Michigan
- Type: Honor
- Affiliation: Independent
- Status: Active
- Emphasis: Dental Hygiene
- Scope: International
- Member badge
- Colors: Deep purple and Bright gold
- Chapters: 139
- Headquarters: 8099 College Parkway; Fort Myers, Florida 33919; United States
- Website: sigmaphialpha.org

Sigma Phi Alpha (ΣΦΑ) is a national honorary society for professionals in the field of dental hygiene.

== History ==
Sigma Phi Alpha originated at the March 1958 business meeting of the Dental Hygiene Education section of the American Dental Hygiene Education Association (now American Dental Education Association). Its purpose is to promote, recognize, and honor scholarship of students in oral or dental hygiene schools. Chapters can only be chartered at schools with a dental hygiene program and membership must be in the upper twenty percent of their class.

The first chapter of Sigma Phi Alpha was installed as the Alpha chapter of Northwestern University in 1958. Seven other chapters were also installed in 1958, along with the Supreme chapter for honorary members. The society became international with the installation of Delta Eta chapter at the University of Manitoba in Winnipeg, Canada.

Sigma Phi Alpha and Omicron Kappa Upsilon, an honorary society for dentistry, organize a joint symposium every other year at the American Dental Education Association annual meetings.

== Symbols ==
The society's emblem is a rectangular gold keypin with the Greek letters ΣΦΑ in a diagonal arrangement from the upper left corner to the lower right corner. Its colors are deep purple and bright gold.

The Greek letters ΣΦΑ represent Sophia meaning wisdom, Philanthropia meaning human feeling and action, and Arete meaning valor and virtue.

== Chapters ==
Most of the society's 139 chapters are in the United States, divided into three geographical regions: central, eastern, and western.

== Scholarships ==
The society awards four competitive scholarships annually through the American Dental Education Association (ADEA) and American Dental Hygienists' Association Institute of Oral Health.

- The Sigma Phi Alpha Certificate/Associate Scholarship is provided to students seeking a certificate or associate degree at a school with an active Sigma Phi Alpha chapter.
- The Sigma Phi Alpha Undergraduate Scholarship is given to a member or potential member of the society who is seeking a baccalaureate degree at a school with an active Sigma Phi Alpha chapter.
- The Sigma Phi Alpha Graduate Scholarship is awarded to a member or potential member of the society enrolled in a graduate program in dental hygiene or a related field.
- The ADEA/Sigma Phi Alpha Linda DeVore Scholarship is provided to students at the baccalaureate, master's, or doctoral degree levels. DeVore was a professor of dental hygiene and a former president of the ADEA and the supreme chapter of Sigma Phi Alpha.

== See also ==
- Professional fraternities and soroities
- List of dental schools in the United States
- List of defunct dental schools in the United States
