= Case School of Dental Medicine =

Graduate school in Cleveland, Ohio, US

Coordinates: 41°30′20″N 81°36′11″W

Case Western Reserve University School of Dental Medicine
- Type: Private university
- Established: 1892
- Dean: Kenneth Chance
- Location: Cleveland, Ohio, U.S.
- Website: dental.case.edu

The Case Western Reserve University School of Dental Medicine (CSDM) is a graduate school of Case Western Reserve University. It is an American dental school located in Cleveland, Ohio. The Case School of Dental Medicine is a clinically oriented dental school. It has been ranked consistently high with its affiliated medical school. Admission to Case Dental School has an acceptance rate of 2.1%. Over 3700 applications for admission are received every year, and 300 applicants are interviewed for the limited 75 positions. The most recently admitted class had a mean undergraduate GPA of 3.77 and a mean DAT of 22 (~90th percentile).

In addition to the DMD (Doctor of Dental Medicine) degree, Case offers five specialty training programs:

The residency program in Oral and Maxillofacial Surgery is a 5-year dual degree (MD-DMD) program that is joint with the Case School of Medicine. The residents receive an MD (Doctor of Medicine) degree at the end of their residency years along with a certificate in Oral and Maxillofacial Surgery.

Endodontics, Periodontics, Orthodontics, and Pediatrics are master's degree programs (M.S.D.) with a certificate granted upon completion of the degree requirements.

== General information ==
The Case School of Dental Medicine was organized in 1892 as the Dental Department of Western Reserve University. Since 1969 the facilities of the school of dentistry have been located in the Health Science Center of Case Western Reserve University adjacent to the schools of medicine and nursing and University Hospitals of Cleveland, Ohio. The dental clinic floor consists of two major clinics and five specialty clinics.

== See also ==
- American Student Dental Association
