= List of defunct dental schools in the United States =

This list of defunct dental schools in the United States includes former dental schools that had previously awarded either Doctor of Dental Medicine (DMD) or Doctor of Dental Surgery (DDS) degree. Either one of these degrees was required to practice as a dentist in the United States. DMD and DDS granting dental schools are accredited by the Commission on Dental Accreditation (CODA), which is under the American Dental Association (ADA).

== Georgia ==
- Emory University School of Dentistry, Atlanta (1988)

== Illinois ==
- Loyola University School of Dentistry, Chicago (1993)
- Northwestern University Dental School, Evanston (2001)

== Louisiana ==
- Loyola University New Orleans (1970)

== Missouri ==
- Saint Louis University School of Dentistry, St. Louis (1967)
- Washington University School of Dental Medicine, St. Louis (1991)

== New Jersey ==
- Fairleigh Dickinson University School of Dental Medicine, Rutherford (1990)

== Ohio ==
- Dr. John Harris Dental School, Dainbridge (was the first formal dental school in the United States, but was not accredited by CODA)
- Ohio College of Dental Surgery, Cincinnati (1926)

== Oklahoma ==
- Oral Roberts University Michael Cardone Sr. School of Dentistry, Tulsa (1986)

== Pennsylvania ==
- Pennsylvania College of Dental Surgery, Philadelphia (1909)

== Tennessee ==
- Vanderbilt University, Nashville (1920) ?

== Washington, D.C. ==
- Georgetown University School of Dentistry (1990)

== See also ==
- List of defunct medical schools in the United States
- Dentistry
- List of dental schools in the United States
- List of medical schools in the United States
