= Charles Baker =

Charles or Charlie Baker may refer to:

== Sports ==
- Charles Baker (American football) (born 1957), American football player
- Charlie Baker (baseball) (1856–1937), American baseball player
- Charles Baker (footballer) (1867–1924), English footballer
- Charlie Baker (Australian footballer) (1880–1962), Australian rules footballer
- Charlie Baker (English footballer) (born 1936), English footballer
- Charlie Baker (racing driver) (born 1952), American NASCAR driver
- Charles Baker (umpire) (died 1937), professional baseball umpire
- Charles Baker (English cricketer) (1883–1976), English cricketer
- Charles Baker (New Zealand cricketer) (born 1947), New Zealand cricketer
- Charlie Baker (cricketer) (born 1939), Australian cricketer
- Chuck Baker (born 1952), American baseball player
- Doc Baker (Charles Baker, died early 1920s), American football player

== Politicians ==
- Charles Baker (surveyor) (1743–1835), American surveyor and jurist
- Charles D. Baker (attorney) (1846–1934), American attorney, New York state representative
- Charles D. Baker (businessman) (1928–2025), American businessman and U.S. government official, grandson of the above
- Charlie Baker (born 1956), American health care executive and governor of Massachusetts, son of the above
- Charles H. Baker (1847–1919), Massachusetts state legislator
- Charles-Henri Baker (born 1955), Haitian politician
- Charles J. Baker (1821–1894), American politician, banker and businessman from Maryland
- Charles Minton Baker (1804–1872), American politician from New York and Wisconsin
- Charles S. Baker (1839–1902), U.S. representative from New York
- Charles W. Baker (1876–1963), American farmer and politician from Illinois

== Armed forces ==
- Charles Baker (Medal of Honor) (1809–1891), American Civil War sailor and Medal of Honor recipient
- Charles George Baker (1830–1906), British recipient of the Victoria Cross and Lewa Pasha

== Arts ==
- Charles Baker (actor) (born 1971), American actor
- Charlie Baker (comedian) British comedian, actor, radio presenter
- Charles Baker (artist) (1839–1888), American painter, saddler, gunsmith, importer, and silver-plate artisan
- C. Graham Baker (1883–1950), American screenwriter and director
- Chuck Baker (musician), Canadian musician

== Other ==
- Charles Baker (instructor) (1803–1874), English instructor of the deaf
- David Lewis (Jesuit priest) (1616–1679), also known as Charles Baker, executed English Jesuit priest
- Charles A. Baker (c. 1921–1991), American talent manager
- Charles Fuller Baker (1872–1927), American entomologist
- Charles H. Baker Jr. (1895–1987), American writer on food and drink
- Charles S. L. Baker (1859–1926), American inventor
- Charles Baker (missionary) (1803–1875), British missionary to New Zealand

== See also ==
- Charles Arnold-Baker (1918–2009), English barrister and historian
- E. C. Stuart Baker (1864–1944), British ornithologist and police officer
