= James A. McNamara =

American dentist

James A. McNamara Jr. (born in San Francisco) is an American-trained, board certified, orthodontist. He is known for his development of McNamara analysis, one of the more popular methods of cephalometric analysis in cephalometry.

== Life ==
James A McNamara Jr., is a graduate of the University of California, Berkeley. He attended dental school at the University of California, San Francisco and continued on to a postgraduate residency in orthodontics at the same institution. He then attended the University of Michigan, where he received a doctorate in anatomy in 1972.

McNamara currently serves as the Thomas M. and Doris Graber Endowed Professor of Dentistry in the Department of Orthodontics and Pediatric Dentistry at the University of Michigan School of Dentistry, professor of cell and developmental biology at the University of Michigan Medical School and research scientist at the Center for Human Growth and Development.

McNamara is a member and past president of the Midwest component of the Edward H. Angle Society of Orthodontists. He served as the chairman of the Council on Scientific Affairs of the American Association of Orthodontics from 1993 to 1996, and is currently the editor-in-chief of Craniofacial Growth Monograph Series, a 41-volume work published through the University of Michigan.

McNamara is the author of over 190 scientific articles, has written, edited or otherwise contributed to 53 textbooks and has presented lectures in 43 countries. Of particular note is his seminal work, Orthodontics and Dentofacial Orthopedics, used as a text in many orthodontic courses. He developed a form of cephalometric analysis referred to as the McNamara method of analysis.

He has maintained a private orthodontic practice in Ann Arbor, Michigan since 1971.

He lives with his wife, Charlene, in Ann Arbor, Michigan.

== Awards and accolades ==
- 1973 Milo Hellman Research Award from the American Association of Orthodontists
- 1979 E. Sheldon Friel Memorial Lecturer of the European Orthodontic Society
- 1983 Research Recognition Award from the American Association of Oral and Maxillofacial Surgeons
- 1994 Jacob A. Salzmann Award from the American Association of Orthodontists Foundation
- 1997 BF Dewel Biomedical Research Award from the American Association of Orthodontists Foundation
- 2001 James E. Brophy Distinguished Service Award from the American Association of Orthodontists
- 2003 Outstanding Research Award from the Edward H. Angle Education and Research Foundation
- 2008 Albert Ketcham Memorial Award from the American Board of Orthodontics
