= James McNamara =

James McNamara may refer to:

- James A. McNamara, American orthodontist
- James O. McNamara, American neurologist and neuroscientist
- James McNamara (politician), member of the South Dakota State Senate, 1927–1929
- James McNamara (athlete) (1939–2016), Irish Olympic athlete
- Jim McNamara, baseball player
- James B. McNamara, one of the McNamara brothers who pleaded guilty to the 1910 bombing of the Los Angeles Times building
- James McNamara, San Francisco seamster and one of the designers of the LGBT pride flag

== See also ==
- James Macnamara (1768–1826), Royal Navy officer
