= Charlotte Mistretta =

American dentistry academic

Charlotte M. Mistretta is an American dental academic.

Mistretta earned a bachelor's degree in biology from Trinity College in 1966, and completed her master's of science and doctoral degrees in biological sciences at Florida State University in 1968 and 1970, respectively. She pursued postdoctoral research at the Nuffield Institute for Medical Research, affiliated with the University of Oxford, then returned to the United States in 1972 for a research position at the University of Michigan. Mistretta became a tenured professor in 1991, and founded the School of Dentistry's Oral Health Sciences PhD program in 1994. Mistretta remained program director until 2010, and was succeeded by Jan Hu. Mistretta also held the William R. Mann Professorship of Dentistry from 2003 to her retirement in 2021. After Mistretta's retirement, Yuji Mishina became Mann Professor.
