= Bailey Jacobson =

American orthodontist

Dr. Bailey Jacobson is an American orthodontist who is a recipient of Earl Emanuel Shephard Award . Jacobson is known for his contributions in the subject of cleft lip and cleft palate.

== Life ==
Jacobson was born on the North Side of Chicago in 1934. He received his dental degree from Northwestern University Dental School in 1957. He then spent two years in the US Army on active duty. After being discharged, Jacobson enrolled in the Orthodontic Program at Northwestern, graduating in 1961. He then became an instructor at the Northwestern Dental School, teaching Bacteriology and orthodontics.

Jacobson's son, Ron Jacobson, is also an orthodontist.

== Professional life ==
Jacobson, along with a very busy private orthodontic practice, was very active in the alumni community of Northwestern Dental School. He served as the chairman of the Alumni Resource Committee and the Dental Alumni Association. He was also a founder of the John R. Thompson Foundation.

Jacobson has over 50 publications in refereed journals and has written chapters in three textbooks. He has also presented over 50 lectures and courses, here and abroad. He had a special interest in the treatment of Cleft Lip and Palate patients and, in 1965, developed an appliance for newborns born with cleft lip and palate to improve feeding, begin their treatment and prepare for surgeries that is still among the "state of the art" treatments today.

== Awards & Positions ==
- Cleft Palate/Craniofacial Journal - Reviewer
- American Journal of Orthodontics & Dentofacial Orthopedics - Reviewer
- Craniofacial Team at Children's (Lurie's) Memorial Hospital, Chicago - Members (40 years)
- Northwestern Alumni Service Award
- Northwester Alumne Merit Award
- Illinois Society of Orthodontists Outstanding Teacher Award - 2001
- American Board of Orthodontics - Diplomate
- Earl E. Shepard Distinguished Service Award - 2004
- Fellow of the American College of Dentists
- Full Professor of Clinical Orthodontics, Northwestern University Dental School (40 years)
- Adjunct Full Professor of Orthodontics, University of Detroit Dental School (35 years)
- Past President of the prestigious Edward H. Angle Society (Midwest) of Orthodontics
