= Hom-Lay Wang =

Taiwanese-American periodontist

Hom-Lay Wang (王鴻烈) is a Taiwanese-born periodontist and director of the graduate periodontal program at University of Michigan School of Dentistry.

== Education and career ==
Wang graduated from Taipei Medical College in Taiwan in 1983. He moved on to Case School of Dental Medicine, where he graduated in 1987 with a Master's degree in periodontics. He remained at Case until 1989 to complete an American dental degree. He received his PhD from Hiroshima University in Hiroshima, Japan in 2008.

In 1987, Wang became a clinical instructor in periodontics at Case School of Dental Medicine. From 1989 to 1997, he was an assistant professor at the University of Michigan School of Dentistry. Since 1995, he has been the director of graduate periodontics at Michigan.

Wang is a diplomate and a former chair and director of the American Board of Periodontology (2004 until 2010), a Fellow of American College of Dentists as well as a director and Fellow of Academy of Osseointegration, and is a diplomate and former president and board director of the ICOI. Wang currently serves as a member of Scientific Oversight Committee, Annual meeting Task Force and Continuing Education Oversight Committee for the American Academy of Periodontology (AAP), JOMI Oversight Committee for the Academy of Osseointegration (AO). He serves as an associate editor for The International Journal of Oral & Maxillofacial Implants, Periodontology, Oral Surgery, Esthetic & Implant Dentistry Organization, eJournal of Oral & Maxillofacial Research, and founding editorial board member for Clinical Advances in Periodontics, editorial board member for the Journal of Periodontology, Clinical Oral Implants Research, International Journal of Periodontics & Restorative Dentistry, Journal of Clinical Periodontology, Compendium of Continuing Education in Dentistry and many others.

Wang is the recipient of following awards/honors: AADS clinical research fellowship award (1992), University of Michigan Outstanding Service Award (2001), Best Faculty Award (2003), The Charles E. English Annual Award in Clinical Science and Techniques (2004), Best papers in Journal of Oral Implantology (2004) and Implant Dentistry (2004), Morton L. Perel Annual Award for Dental Implant Educator (2007), AAP University of Michigan Outstanding Teaching and Mentoring in Periodontics (2010), AAP special citation award (2013), ITI Andre Schroeder Research Prize (2014), AO Osseointegration Foundation Clinical Research Recipient (2016), AAP Outstanding Educator Award (2017) and AAP Distinguished Scientist Award (2017).Wang has given over 600 lectures relating to his field of expertise both across the United States and internationally.

== Publications ==
Wang has published or contributed to scores of peer reviewed dental research articles relating to periodontal and dental implant-related clinical research with a specific focus on barrier membranes, bone grafting and growth factors. He has also published a textbook on complications related to surgical dental implant therapy.

Wang received a special citation for his contribution to the 2013 American Academy of Periodontology report on Peri-implant Mucositis and Peri-implantitis.
