= Thomas Gilmer =

Thomas Gilmer may refer to:

- Thomas Walker Gilmer (1802–1844), American statesman
- Thomas Lewis Gilmer (1849–1931), American oral surgeon
