= Mistretta (surname) =

Mistretta is a surname. Notable people with the surname include:

- Charles Mistretta, American medical physicist
- Charlotte Mistretta, American dentistry academic
- Chris Rush (1946–2018; born Christopher John Mistretta), American comedian
- Francesco Mistretta (1798–1862), Sicilian Politician
- John Mistretta, plaintiff of the United States Supreme Court case Mistretta v. United States
