= Washington University School of Dental Medicine =

Dental school in St. Louis, Missouri, US

Coordinates: 38.635414°N 90.261810°W

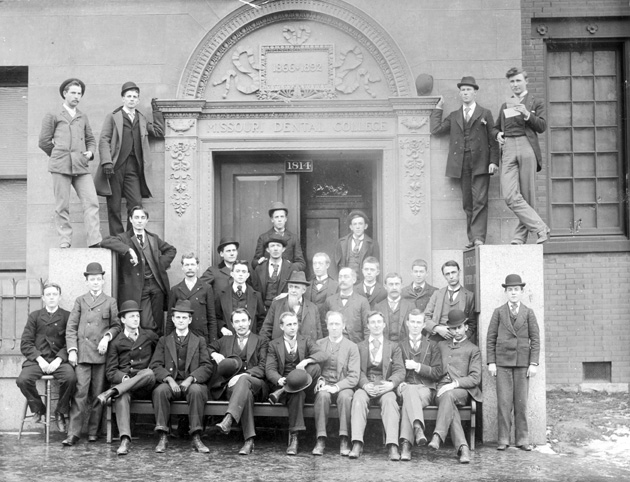
- 1893 Freshmen class at the newly merged Dental Department of Washington University at the location of 1814 Locust Street
- Type: Private
- Active: 1866–1991
- Location: St. Louis, Missouri, US
- Website: WUSD site

The Washington University School of Dental Medicine (WUSDM) was the dental school of Washington University in St. Louis. Established in 1866, the Washington University School of Dental Medicine was the first dental school west of the Mississippi River. The school closed in 1991. Over 5,000 dentists were educated at WUSDM. WUSDM was a pioneer in the practice of scientific dental education previously absent in the dental profession.

The school was founded by the Missouri State Dental Society and dentist Henry E. Peebles as the Missouri Dental College in 1866. The first dean of the school was Homer Judd. It is the first dental school west of the Mississippi River and only the sixth dental school in the U.S. In 1892 the Missouri Dental College merged with Washington University in St. Louis, becoming the Dental Department of Washington University. In 1908 the first woman was admitted to study at the university. In 1928, Washington University School of Dental Medicine relocated to 4559 Scott Avenue at the Washington University School of Medicine campus.

In 1958 the University launched the Baby Tooth Survey, led by Dr. Louise Reiss and with funding from the Greater St. Louis Citizen's Committee for Nuclear Information (CNI), which studied strontium-90 absorption of children by examining their deciduous teeth. During the 1970s the University began an experimental three-year DMD curriculum. In 1989 Wash U's board of trustees voted to close the School of Dental Medicine. The board said that the decision was based upon budget deficits, increasing tuition rates, competition from less-expensive state-funded dental schools, limited outside funding, and a declining student enrollment. By 1991 the Dental School graduated its 125th and final class.

== History ==
- 1866–1892 Missouri Dental College
- 1892–1909 Dental Department of Washington University
- 1909–1919 Washington University Dental School
- 1919–1974 Washington University School of Dentistry
- 1974–1991 Washington University School of Dental Medicine

== Notable alumni ==
- Charles J. Burstone
- Glennon Engleman, Class of 1954
- Thomas M. Graber
- Wayne A. Bolton, Class of 1950
- Thomas Lewis Gilmer, Class of 1882
- Robert J. Gorlin
- Benno Lischer, Class of 1900
- Earl Emanuel Shepard
- Mike Simpson, Class of 1977, U.S. Representative from Idaho's 2nd congressional district since 1999
