= Sindecuse Museum of Dentistry =

Museum in Ann Arbor, Michigan

- Established: 1991
- Location: 1011 North University, Ann Arbor, MI 48109-2229
- Coordinates: 42.278710°N 83.736933°W
- Collection size: 15,000
- Curator: Shannon O’Dell
- Website: sindecusemuseum.org

The Sindecuse Museum of Dentistry is a museum of the history of dentistry, operated by the University of Michigan School of Dentistry in Ann Arbor, Michigan. Visitors to the museum can only gain access to the building through the main clinic entrance. Located on the university's Central Campus, the museum is one of only a handful of dentistry museums in the world.

== History ==
The Sindecuse Museum was established in 1991 with a grant from Dr. Gordon H. Sindecuse, a 1921 graduate of the U-M School of Dentistry. Its first professional part-time curator was hired that year. However, the museum's collections had been forming for several decades before the museum was established, as members of the School of Dentistry faculty, including Dr. Charles Kelsey, Professor Al Richards, and dental librarian Sue Segar, preserved and stored equipment, photos, and documents relating to the history of dentistry and the history of the dental school.

The museum was originally housed on the first- and ground-floor lobby of the Kellogg Institute Building. Plans for expansion of the museum as part of a larger renovation of the Kellogg Building began in 1995. Following two years of construction, the Sindecuse Museum reopened on September 8, 2000, with a new atrium taking the place of what was formerly a courtyard that connected the Kellogg and Dental Buildings. The expansion also saw the addition of five new exhibit cases in an adjacent hallway; a climate-controlled collection storage room; and modern storage cabinets and mobile storage racks.

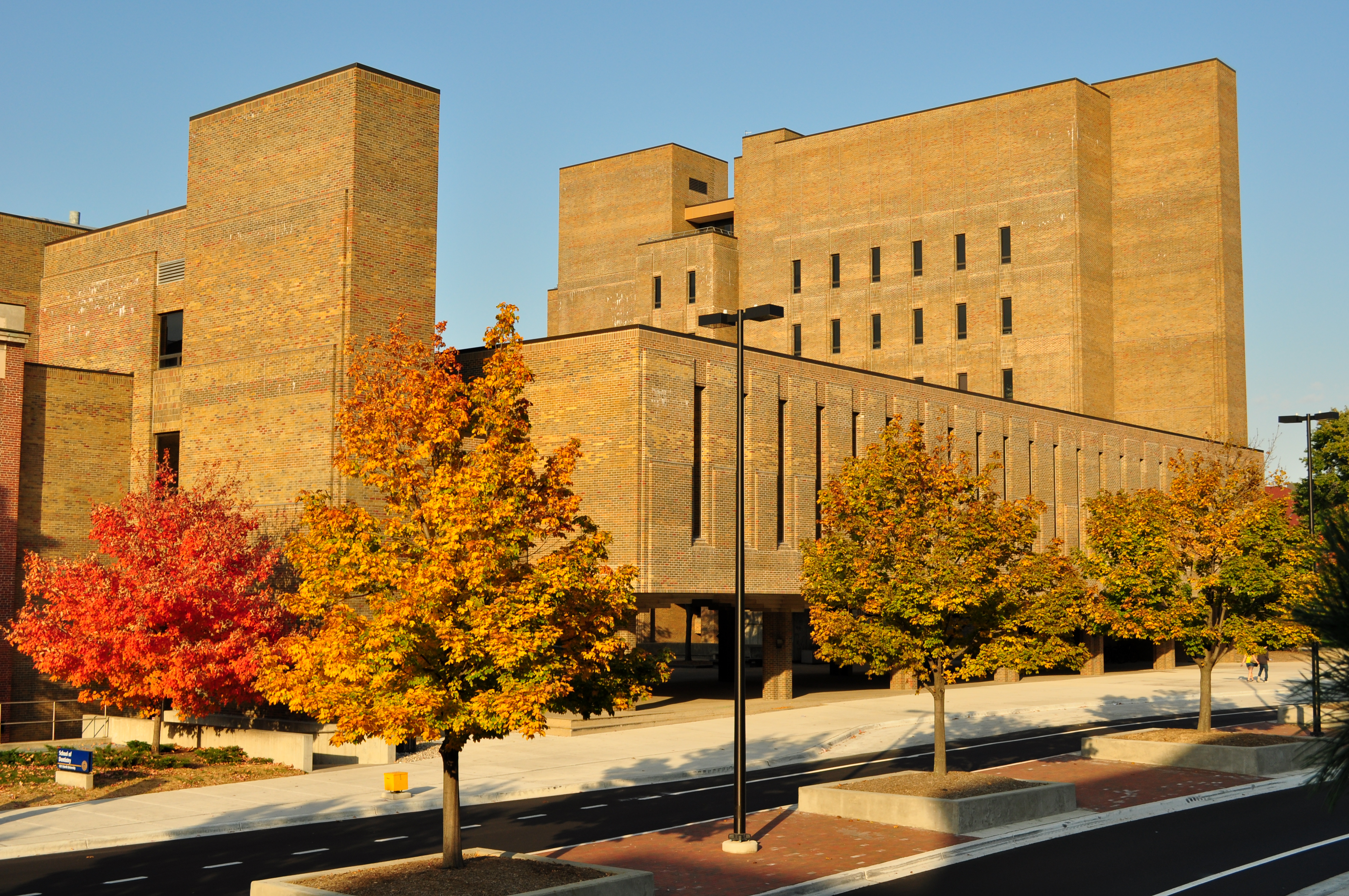
University of Michigan School of Dentistry

The museum's current staff consists of two full-time employees, a curator and a collections coordinator, and a number of part-time University of Michigan students. Jane Becker was the museum's first curator, followed by Tammy Szatkowski-Reeves, and Shannon O'Dell. The current curator is Tamara Barnes.

== Collection ==
The Sindecuse Museum of Dentistry has a collection of more than 15,000 catalogued items, about 15 percent of which are displayed at one time. The museum's collection emphasizes dental technology and the history of the dental profession, particularly in the United States and Michigan.

Artifacts date from the 18th century to the present day, and include dental equipment such as articulators, denture-forming equipment, and dental X-ray items, as well as historical oral hygiene items, which include a toothpaste and tooth powder collection on loan. Among the exhibits are materials on Saint Apollonia, the patron saint of dentistry; a collection of dentistry-themed children's books and toys; and materials on the noted dentist Willoughby D. Miller, a graduate of the university. The museum's collection includes "toothbrushes with heads greater than two inches in length, floss made from silk and examination chairs grand enough for a king."
