= Mabel Sykes =

American photographer

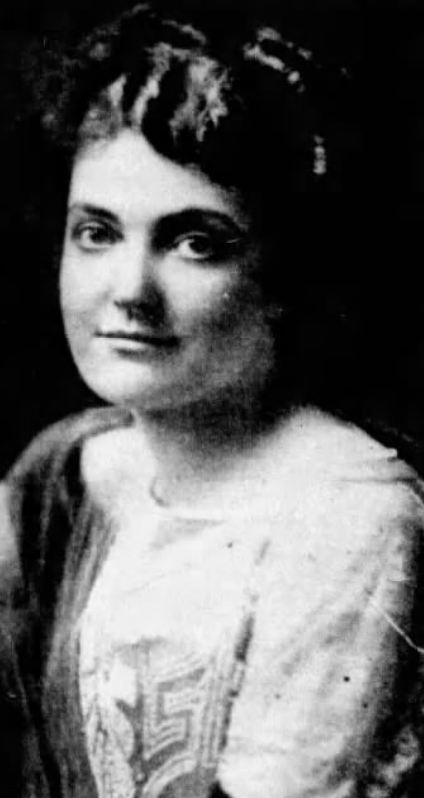
- Mabel Sykes, from a 1923 newspaper
- Born: Mabel Huxley; March 1883; Homewood, Illinois, U.S.
- Died: August 21, 1963 (age 80); Chicago, Illinois, U.S.
- Other names: Mabel Barsanti
- Occupation: Photographer

Mabel Huxley Sykes Barsanti (March 1883 – August 21, 1963) was an American photographer based in Chicago. She was known as "Rudolph Valentino's favorite photographer". She also photographed musicians and vaudeville performers, babies, brides, landscapes, and Clarence Darrow.

== Early life and education ==
Mabel Huxley was born in Homewood, Illinois, the daughter of Charles DeWitt Huxley and Henrietta H. Zimmer Huxley.

== Career ==
Sykes learned the photography business from her first husband, and had her own studio in Chicago's Loop after their divorce in 1914. She opened a second studio on Chicago's Northside in 1921. She photographed performers including Rudolph Valentino and Sibyl Sammis-MacDermid. She also photographed portraits for professionals including lawyer Clarence Darrow and oral surgeon Thomas Lewis Gilmer. Landscape photos by Sykes appeared in a Sierra Club publication. She also took society portraits and school yearbook photos. She retired from the photography business in 1931.

Sykes was known as "Rudolph Valentino's favorite photographer".

== Gallery ==
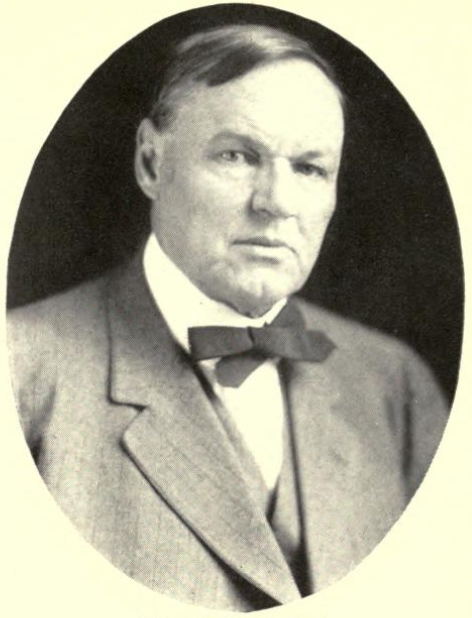
Clarence Darrow

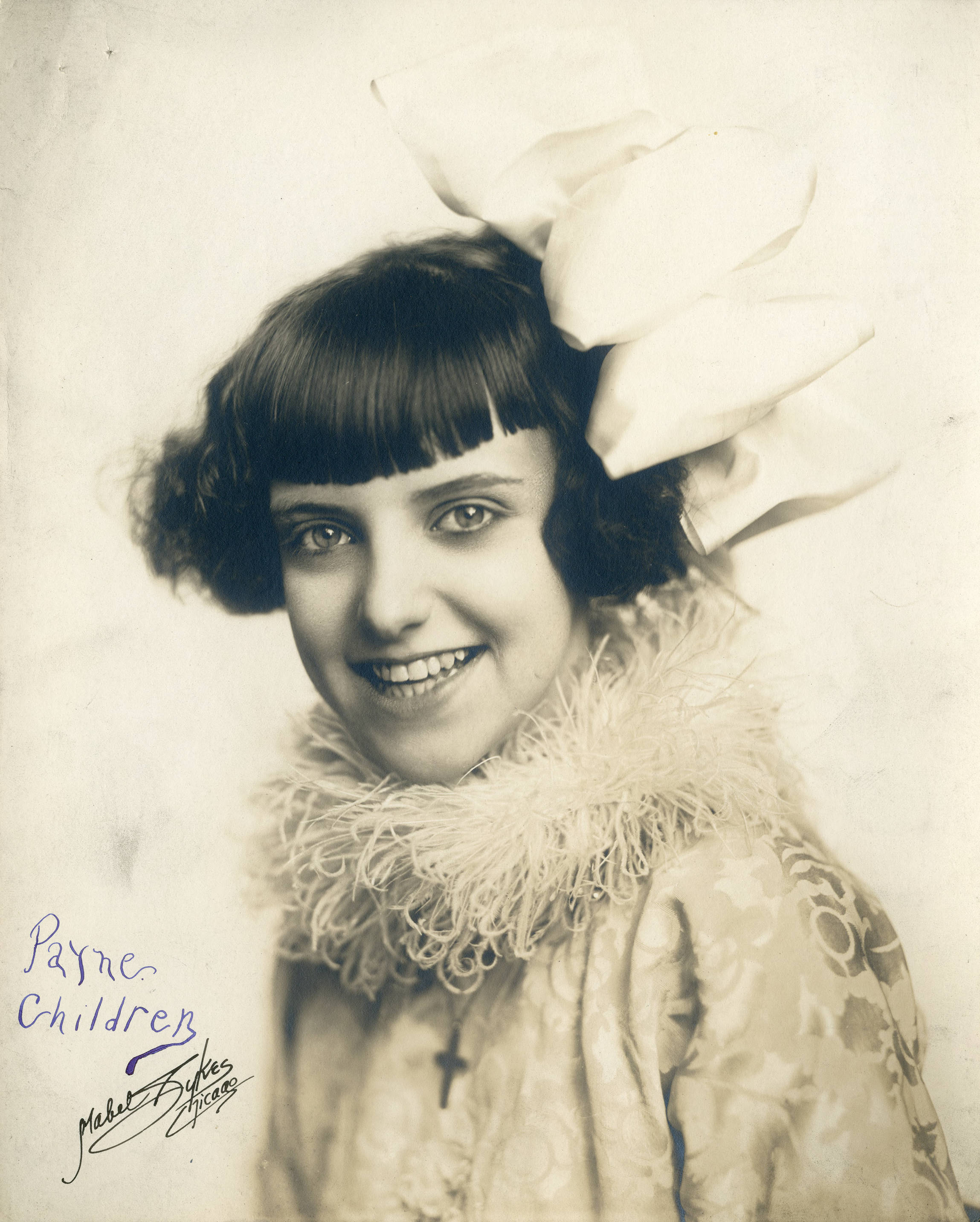
"Baby" Payne

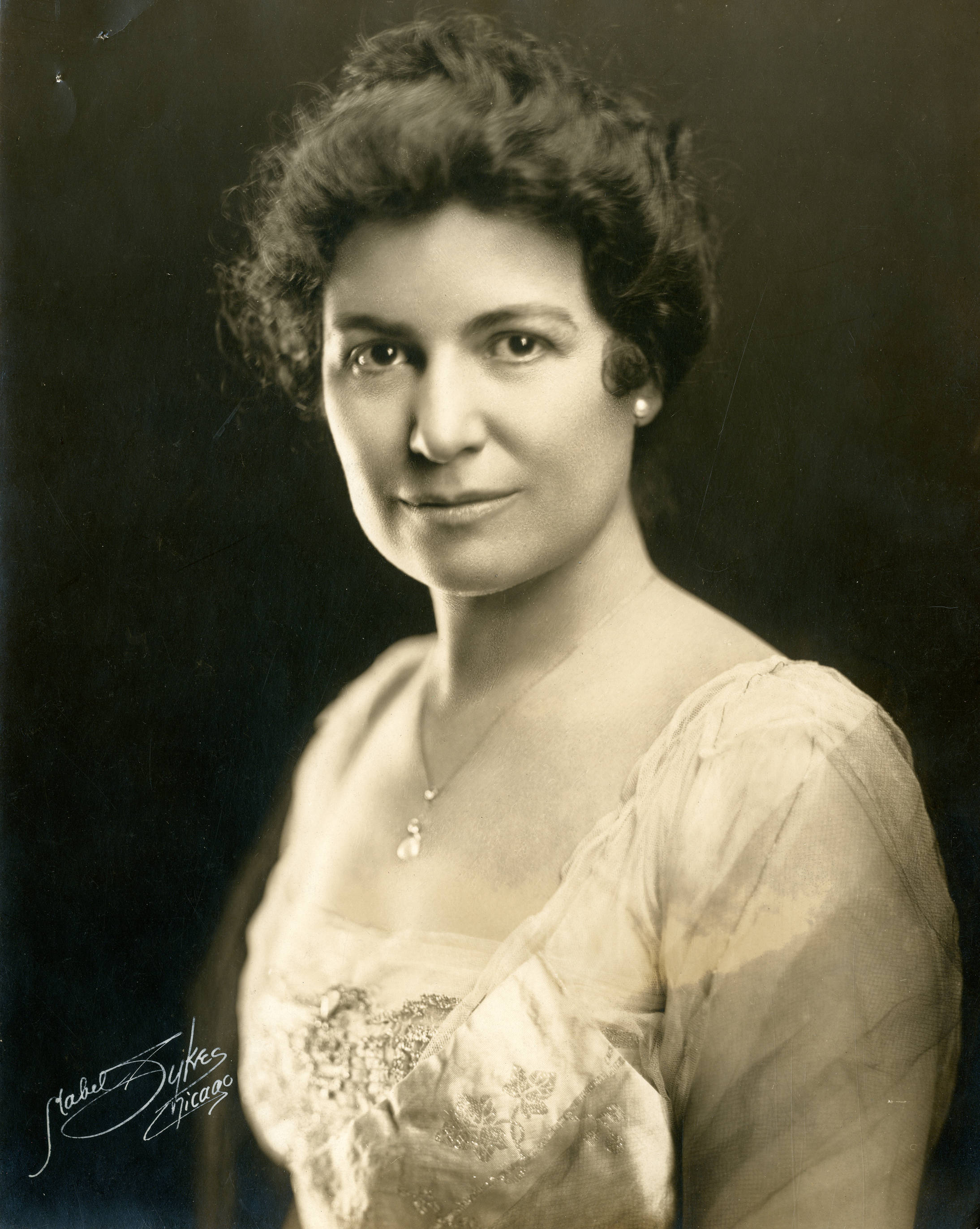
Sibyl Sammis-MacDermid

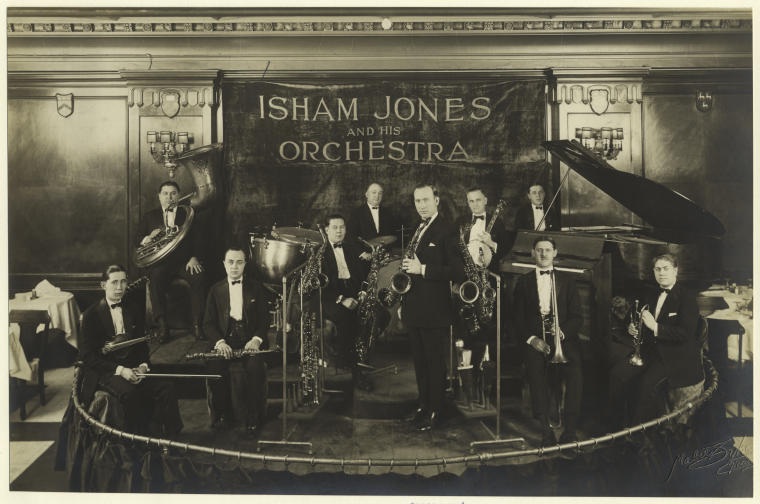
Isham Jones and his Orchestra

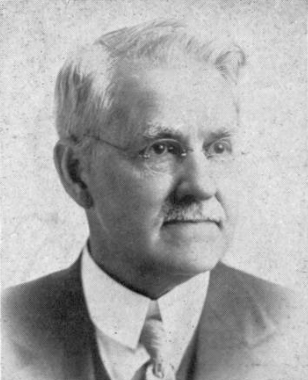
Thomas Lewis Gilmer

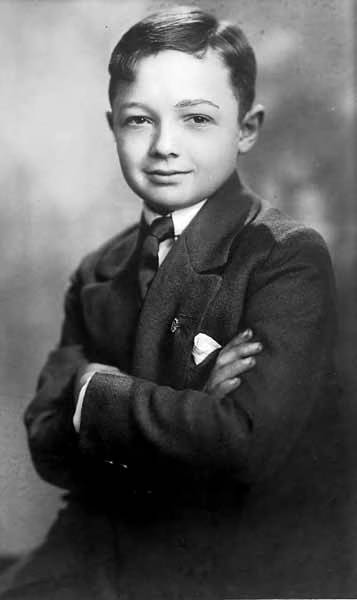
William Ross Grant

== Personal life ==
Huxley married photographer Melvin H. Sykes in 1902; they divorced in 1914. She married salesman Alfred J. Barsanti, in 1917; they divorced in 1929. She died in 1963, at the age of 80, in Chicago.
