= Northwestern University Dental School =

Dental school in Chicago, Illinois, US

- Active: 1891–May 31, 2001
- Affiliations: Northwestern University
- Location: Lake and Dearborn Streets, Evanston, Illinois, United States

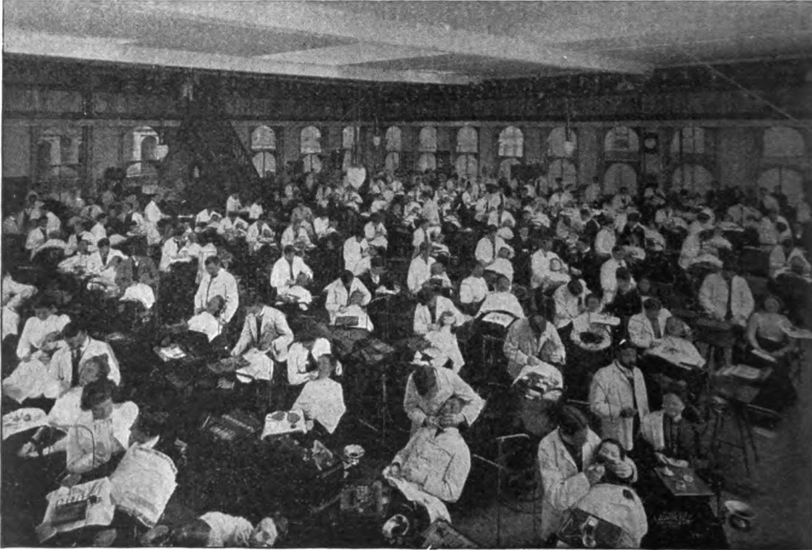
Clinic at Northwestern University Dental School. (1903)

The Northwestern University Dental School was a private dental school that operated from 1891 to 2001 in Chicago, Illinois, United States.

== History ==
The Northwestern University Dental School opened in 1891. Its first dean was Edgar Swain. The school was initially located on South State Street in Chicago, Illinois. In 1893, it moved into the new Medical School buildings on South Dearborn and East 24th Streets in Chicago.

In 1895, Northwestern University bought the American College of Dental Surgery and merged the two schools into one. After Swain retired as the dean in 1897, G. V. Black took over the position. He served as the professor of pathology before his appointment. After becoming the dean, he worked to re-organize the curriculum of the dental school. In 1902, the Dental School was moved to the corner of Lake and Dearborn Streets, along with the Pharmacy and the Law Schools after the university purchased the Tremont Hotel building.

Thomas Lewis Gilmer became the next dean after Black died. Arthur D. Black, son of G. V. Black, became the fourth dean of the dental school after Gilmer's retirement in 1918. Arthur Black was instrumental in organizing the World Dental Congress along with the Century of Progress Fair in Chicago in 1933. Under Arthur Black the dental school moved to the Montgomery Ward Memorial.

After Black died of pneumonia, Charles W. Freeman became the next Dean in 1938 and served until 1953. Freeman was noted for creating one of the first centers for dental research at the Dental School. In addition, he promoted the foreign student program, and established the Cleft Palate Institute involving the dental, medical, and speech schools. After Freeman retired, George W. Teuscher was appointed the next dean and served the position until 1971. In 1972, Norman Olsen became the next dean. Olsen retired in 1995 and the next dean was Michael Heuer who in December 1997 announced the closing of the Dental School as dictated by the university board of trustees and president.

The Dental School closed on May 31, 2001. According to the trustees, financial stresses and reputation contributed to the closure of the school.

== Achievements ==
- First Post Doctoral Degree in Dentistry, 1922
- First Graduate Program in Pediatric Dentistry, 1935
- One of the First Graduate Orthodontic Programs
- Founding place of Omicron Kappa Upsilon Dental Honor Society, 1914
- Founding place of Sigma Pi Alpha Dental Hygiene Honor Society, 1951
- First use of Procaine in mandibular anesthesia in America
- Discovering place of Gardol which is a plaque preventative used in Toothpastes and mouthwashes.

== Notable alumni ==
- Miles Dewey Davis Jr., dentist and father of jazz trumpeter Miles Davis
- Lee Graber, orthodontist
- Thomas M. Graber, orthodontist
- Bailey Jacobson, orthodontist
- Cheddi Jagan, 4th President of Guyana, 1st Premier of British Guiana
- Joseph Jarabak, chair of orthodontic program at Loyola University Chicago Orthodontic
- William Thomas Jefferson, first Black dentist to practice dentistry in the United States Army
- Hayes Nance, orthodontist
- Frederick Bogue Noyes, dentist
- Weedon Osborne, dentist, was a United States Navy officer and a recipient of America's highest military decoration—the Medal of Honor—for his actions in World War I.

== Notable faculty ==
- Edward Angle, professor of orthodontics at the Dental School, known as the father of American orthodontics
- Greene Vardiman Black, second dean of the Dental School, known as the father of operative dentistry.
- Dean Harold Noyes, Chairman of the Orthodontic Department of the Dental School
