= Doris Doe =

American contralto (1899-1985)

- Doe, from a 1929 publication
- Born: Doris Annabelle Doe; March 22, 1899; Bar Harbor, Maine, U.S.
- Died: December 26, 1985 (aged 86); Chattanooga, Tennessee, U.S.
- Occupations: Opera vocalist, music educator

Doris Annabelle Doe (March 22, 1899 – December 26, 1985) was an American opera vocalist. She gave over 300 performances with the Metropolitan Opera, sang in recitals and oratorios, and taught voice at the University of Chattanooga.

== Early life and education ==
Doe was born in Bar Harbor, Maine, and raised in Maine and Florida, the daughter of John Watson Doe and Amy Bacheldor Rice Doe. Her father was a pharmacist. She trained in music, voice, and drama with Sibyl Sammis-MacDermid, Jeanne Boyd, Frank La Forge, and Charles A. Baker, and, with funds from Louise Homer and Sidney Homer, in Europe.

== Career ==
From the 1920s into the 1940s, Doe, a contralto or mezzo-soprano, sang solos in oratorios, gave recitals, performed on radio, and made recordings on the Victor, Gennett, and Columbia labels, including duets with Homer Rodeheaver. She was a soloist at the Marble Collegiate Church in Manhattan.

Doe performed operas in Dresden, Paris, Monte Carlo and Milan before she was engaged by the Metropolitan Opera in 1931, and her debut as a dramatic contralto at the Met came in 1932, as Brangäne in Tristan und Isolde. She also appeared in Met productions of Die Walküre (1932), Lohengrin (1933), The Flying Dutchman (1937), Pelléas et Mélisande (1940), Boris Godunov (1942), and Louise (1943).

In 1935, 1941, and 1942 Doe gave recitals at New York's Town Hall venue, showing "her soundness as a singer, her intelligence as an interpretive musician and her curiosity to explore untrodden paths of vocal literature", according to The New York Times reviewer Olin Downes in 1942. In 1943, she sang at a memorial service for Philip A. Bennett, held in the United States House of Representatives.

Doe also performed in Florida. In 1940 she gave a recital at Mar-A- Lago, to benefit church charities in Palm Beach. In 1950, she toured the United States giving musical lectures about her career. Beginning in 1954, Doe taught voice at the University of Chattanooga's music conservatory.

== Personal life ==
Doe was injured in a car accident in 1940. In 1942, her home in Bennington, New Hampshire burned down. She lived with her former student, singer Louise Holdam, in New York City and in Chattanooga. Doe died in 1985, at the age of 86, in Chattanooga, Tennessee.
