= Lee Graber =

American orthodontist (born 1946)

Lee W. Graber (born 1946) is an American orthodontist who is the recipient of the Albert H. Ketcham Award in 2012. He also co-authored the textbook Orthodontics: Current Principles and Techniques along with his father Thomas M. Graber. He is a past president of World Federation of Orthodontists.

== Life ==
He received his dental degree from University of Michigan School of Dentistry. He also received his master's degree in Anatomy from Michigan Dental School. He then pursued his PhD in growth and development at University of Michigan also. He received his Orthodontic Training at Northwestern University Dental School. Dr. Graber is co-editor of the 6th edition of the textbook Orthodontics: Current Principles and Techniques. The initial edition of this textbook was written by his late father, Dr. T.M. Graber.

He currently practices at a private practice in Illinois, with his daughter. They have offices in Vernon Hills and Glenview.

== Positions and awards ==
- Illinois Society of Orthodontists, president
- Midwestern Society of Orthodontists, president and trustee
- World Federation of Orthodontists, president, 2000–2005
- WFO's first executive committee, 1995–2000
- American Association of Orthodontists, president
- Albert H. Ketcham Award, 2012
- ISO Merit Awards
