= Sibyl Sammis-MacDermid =

American singer

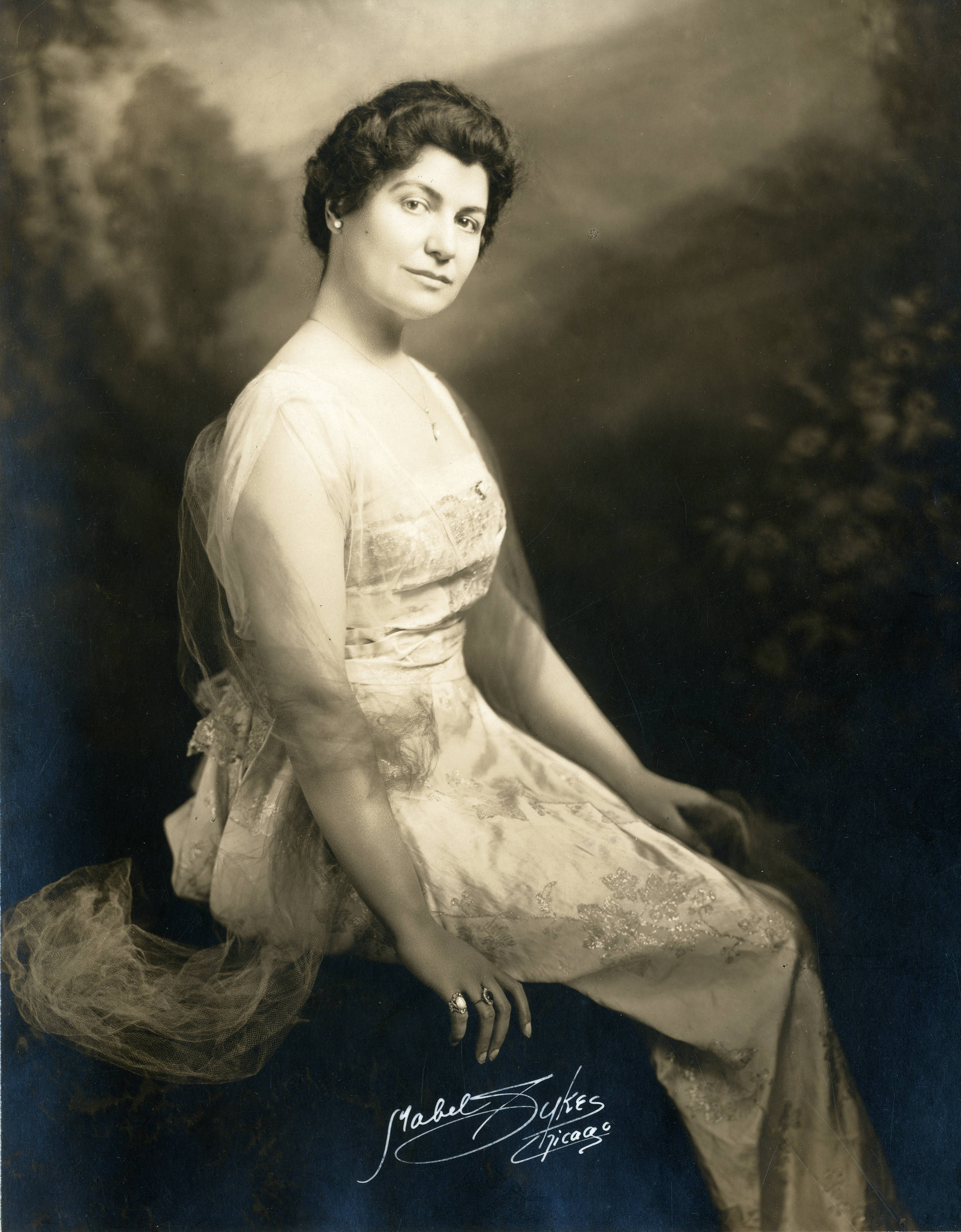
- Sibyl Sammis-MacDermid in 1921, photographed by Mabel Sykes
- Born: Sibyl Mary Sammis; May 12, 1876; Illinois, U.S.
- Died: November 5, 1940 (aged 64); New York, New York, U.S.
- Occupations: Singer, voice teacher

Sibyl Mary Sammis-MacDermid (May 12, 1876 – November 5, 1940) was an American soprano singer and voice teacher, based in Chicago in the 1910s, and in New York City after 1921.

== Early life and education ==
Sammis was born in Illinois, the daughter of Oscar Fitzgerald Sammis and Julia Bogue Sammis. Her father was a miner in the Dakota Territory when she was a girl. Writer Hobart Chatfield-Taylor was her cousin. She went to Chicago to study with Ragna Linne, and pursued further studies in London and Paris.

== Career ==
Sammis-MacDermid performed at the Proms in London in 1904, under conductor Henry Wood. In 1907 she sang at a benefit concert to raise money for a hospital in Iowa. She made several recordings on the Victor label in 1910. She was a soprano soloist with the Chicago Symphony Orchestra in 1910 and 1911. She was a church soloist, and taught voice students from her studio in Chicago. Her husband accompanied her in some recitals, and she sang his compositions. She also sang songs by Carrie Jacobs-Bond and Lily Wadhams Moline. Alma Voedisch was the MacDermids' manager.

In 1919, Sammis-MacDermid organized an all-female touring quartet, the Sibyl Sammis Singers. from some of her best students, including Doris Doe. She gave a joint recital with baritone Fred Newell Morris in Indianapolis in 1922. Also in 1922, she gave a five-week master class at a music school in Kansas City. She posed at the wheel of an Oldsmobile car as an endorsement for the brand. She was vice-president of the Society of American Musicians in Chicago.

== Publications ==
- "Silence and Harmony" (1918, short essay in Christian Science Sentinel)

== Personal life ==
Sammis married Canadian-born composer James Gardiner MacDermid in 1909. The couple moved to New York City around 1921. She died in 1940, at the age of 64, in New York City.
