= Doris Graber =

American political scientist (1923–2018)

Doris Appel Graber
- Born: November 11, 1923; St. Louis, Missouri
- Died: February 17, 2018 (aged 94); Evanston, Illinois
- Occupations: Professor and Author
- Years active: 1949 to 2018
- Known for: As of 2012, when she retired, was among the top 100 most cited scholars in political science
- Spouse: Dr. Thomas M. Graber

Academic background
- Education: Columbia University (Ph.D., 1949) Washington University (M.A., 1942; B.A., 1941)

Academic work
- Discipline: Political Science and Political Communication
- Institutions: University of Illinois at Chicago (1963 to 2012); Northwestern University; University of Chicago; and North Park College.
- Notable works: First Editor of the journal Political Communication

Doris Appel Graber (11 November 1923 – 17 February 2018) was an American political scientist.

Doris Appel was born in St. Louis, Missouri, on 11 November 1923, to Ernst and Marta Appel. She had a sister, Ruth. Doris Appel earned bachelor's (1941) and master's (1942) degrees in political science from the Washington University in St. Louis, and completed a doctorate at Columbia University in 1949. She studied international law and relations and her dissertation was titled, The Development of the Law of Belligerent Occupation: 1863-1914, A Historical Survey. She taught at Northwestern University, the University of Chicago and North Park College, prior to accepting a position as lecturer at University of Illinois at Chicago in 1963. Graber was founding editor of the journal Political Communication. She won the academic Goldsmith Book Prize in 2003, for Learning From Television in the Internet Age, published in 2001. She retired from teaching at UIC in 2012. The Political Communication Section of the American Political Science Association has awarded the Doris Graber (Book) Award since 2000, in her honor.

Doris Appel was married to Thomas M. Graber from 1941 until his death in 2007. The couple had five children, including Lee Graber, an orthodontist. Doris Appel Graber died in Evanston, Illinois, on 17 February 2018.

== Selected works ==
- Verbal Behavior and Politics (1976)
- Mass Media and American Politics (1980)
- Crime News and the Public (1980)
- President and the Public (1982)
- Processing the News: How People Tame the Information Tide (1984)
- Processing Politics (2001)
- The Power of Communication: Managing Information in Public Organizations (2002)
- On Media: Making Sense of Politics (2012)
