= Marcus Llewellyn Ward =

American dentistry academic (1875–1963)

Marcus Llewellyn Ward (5 August 1875 – 9 January 1963) was an American dentistry academic.

A native of Howell, Michigan, Ward was born on 5 August 1875, and attended county schools. After graduating from Fenton Normal College, he was a county schoolteacher for five years, then enrolled at the University of Michigan School of Dentistry. Ward completed his Doctor of Dental Surgery degree in 1902, and served as dental instructor for the following three years while working toward a Doctor of Dental Science, then operated his own dental practice in Detroit between 1905 and 1908. Upon his full-time return to the University of Michigan, Ward was appointed professor of operative principles then, in 1912, professor of dental physics and chemistry. In 1916, he became professor of metallurgy and crown and bridge work, as well as dean of the dental school. He retired from the deanship in 1934 to assume the Jonathan Taft Professorship of Dentistry and remained on the faculty until 1945.

Over the course of his career, Ward served as president of the American Dental Association, Michigan Dental Association and American Association of Dental Schools, as well as vice president of the Pan-American Medical Association. He was member of the International Association for Dental Research, Michigan Academy of Science, Arts, and Letters, and the American Association of University Professors, among others.

Marcus Ward married music educator Mille J. Carpenter (28 March 1875 – 1 June 1971) in May 1899. Ward died of a heart attack on 9 January 1963 in the parking lot of the University of Michigan Hospital. A collection of Ward's papers are held by the University of Michigan Library.
