= Joseph Jarabak =

American orthodontist and academic (1906–1989)

Joseph R. Jarabak (April 18, 1906 – April 24, 1989) was an American orthodontist. He was chair of orthodontic program at Loyola University Chicago Orthodontic Program and has made many contributions to orthodontics over the years, one of them being Jarabak Analysis, which was developed in 1972. Jarabak Analysis is one of the Cephalometric analysis that interprets how the craniofacial growth may affect the pre- and post-treatment dentition.

== Life ==
He was born in 1906 in Evergreen Park, Illinois. He had four other siblings. He went to Washington High School (East Chicago, Indiana). He chose mechanical engineering classes at University of Michigan initially. During the course of his college years, he became interested in dentistry and applied to both engineering and dental graduate schools. He eventually ended up choosing University of Michigan School of Dentistry as an option and received his dental degree in 1930 from there. He opened up his practice in East Chicago soon after dental school. He then received his master's degree in orthodontics from Northwestern University Dental School in 1941.

== Career ==
From 1943 to 1947, he was an assistant teacher in anatomy at Northwestern University. In 1953, he received his PhD degree in orthodontics and anatomy at Northwestern. He then became chair of the orthodontics department at the Loyola Dental School. He published his textbook called Technique and Treatment with the Light-Wire Appliance. He gave many lectures and seminars in this light-wire appliances. Later in his career, he taught with T. M. Graber at the University of Chicago.

Jarabak also developed of what is called Jarabak Cephalometric Analysis to be used for diagnosis and treatment planning in orthodontics.

== Awards ==
- Albert H. Ketcham Memorial Awards, 1983
- Professor Emeritus of Orthodontics, Loyola University, 1986
- Calvin S. Case Award, Loyola University, 1978
