= Jacques Eduardo Nör =

Jacques Eduardo Nör is a Brazilian dentist and researcher who has served as dean of the University of Michigan School of Dentistry since August 2023. He is the Donald A. Kerr Collegiate Professor of Dentistry at the university and a professor of otolaryngology–head and neck surgery at its medical school. His research focuses on how stem cells contribute to dental pulp regeneration and how cancer stem cells interact with blood vessels in head and neck tumors. He served as the 50th president of the American Association for Dental, Oral, and Craniofacial Research (AADOCR) from 2021 to 2022.

== Education ==
Nör received his dental degree from the Federal University of Rio Grande do Sul in Porto Alegre, Brazil, in 1985. He completed a certificate in pediatric dentistry there in 1990. In a professional association interview, he recalled growing up in a small town in southern Brazil and moving to the United States in 1992 to pursue graduate studies at the University of Michigan.

At Michigan, Nör earned a master's degree in pediatric dentistry in 1994 and a doctorate in oral health sciences in 1999. His doctoral research in Peter Polverini's laboratory examined how growth signals affect the survival of cells that line blood vessels. He completed a postdoctoral fellowship in cancer cell biology at the University of Michigan Medical School in 2001.

== Academic career ==
=== Faculty appointments ===
Nör joined the University of Michigan School of Dentistry in 1994 as a clinical instructor in the Department of Orthodontics and Pediatric Dentistry. He moved to the Department of Cariology, Restorative Sciences, and Endodontics as an assistant professor in 1999. He was promoted to associate professor with tenure in 2003 and to full professor in 2006. In 2011, he was appointed Donald A. Kerr Collegiate Professor of Dentistry. He became chair of the department in 2015.

His appointments at Michigan have also included otolaryngology–head and neck surgery and biomedical engineering. From 2011 to 2016, he co-directed the university's Head and Neck Cancer Specialized Program of Research Excellence, funded by the National Cancer Institute.

=== Deanship ===
The University of Michigan Board of Regents approved Nör's appointment as dean on June 15, 2023. He began a five-year renewable term on August 1, becoming the school's 15th dean. Jan Ching-Chun Hu had served as interim dean after the previous dean, Laurie McCauley, became the university's provost.

In his first annual report after taking office, Nör highlighted the school's clinical rotations in communities across Michigan, including clinics that serve patients with limited access to dental care. In 2024, he announced the appointment of Sarah Tomaka to lead the Community-Based Collaborative Care and Education program, which organizes those rotations. His 2025 report marked the school's 150th anniversary and reviewed its history in dental education, research, and patient care.

== Research ==
=== Dentin bonding and vascular biology ===
Nör's early dental research compared how restorative materials bond to dentin in primary and permanent teeth. In a 1996 study with Robert Feigal and colleagues, the researchers used scanning electron microscopy to examine the layer where adhesive resin penetrates treated dentin. Under the conditions they tested, this layer was thicker in primary teeth. The authors suggested that differences in how primary and permanent dentin respond to acid treatment could help explain differences in bonding.

In 1999, Nör and colleagues reported that vascular endothelial growth factor promoted the survival of cells lining small blood vessels in their experiments. They linked the effect to increased expression of Bcl-2, a protein that helps cells resist programmed cell death. The work examined how cell survival contributes to angiogenesis, the formation of new blood vessels.

=== Dental pulp regeneration ===
Nör and his collaborators studied whether stem cells from naturally shed primary teeth could form tissue resembling dental pulp, the soft tissue inside a tooth. In a 2008 study with Mabel Cordeiro and colleagues, the researchers placed the cells in scaffolds inside slices of human teeth. After implantation in mice, the cells formed tissue with features of dental pulp. In a follow-up study, Vivien Sakai, Nör, and their colleagues reported that the cells could develop into both odontoblasts that produced dentin and endothelial cells that lined blood vessels.

In a separate 2010 study, Luciano Casagrande, Nör, and colleagues investigated bone morphogenetic protein 2 (BMP-2), a signaling protein present in dentin. Their experiments indicated that BMP-2 helps direct stem cells from primary teeth to become odontoblasts. A later review by Mizuki Nagata, Noriaki Ono, and Wanida Ono discussed these studies in its account of how dental stem cells develop into different cell types. Nör and Andrea Mantesso revisited potential dental applications of stem cells in a 2023 review in The Journal of the American Dental Association.

=== Head and neck cancer ===
Nör's cancer research has examined the relationship between cancer stem cells and the blood vessels around them. In a 2010 study of head and neck squamous cell carcinoma, Sudha Krishnamurthy, Nör, and colleagues found that signals from cells lining blood vessels helped cancer stem cells survive and produce more cells with similar properties. A subsequent study identified interleukin 6 as one signal contributing to that effect. A 2022 review discussed both studies in its account of how the environment around a tumor can affect cancer stem cells.

His later work included preclinical studies of treatment resistance in salivary gland cancers, including mucoepidermoid carcinoma and adenoid cystic carcinoma. He also coauthored a 2026 report in Nature Communications on a phase I clinical trial of alrizomadlin, an experimental MDM2 inhibitor, in patients with recurrent or metastatic salivary gland cancers with wild-type TP53. The ASCO Post covered earlier findings from the trial when they were presented in 2024.

== Professional service ==
Nör chaired the Oral, Dental and Craniofacial Sciences study section of the National Institutes of Health from 2017 to 2019. He subsequently chaired the Dentistry and Oral Health Sciences section of the American Association for the Advancement of Science. In September 2021, the National Institute of Dental and Craniofacial Research introduced him as a new member of its national advisory council, where he initially sat as an ad hoc member.

Nör took office as AADOCR president in July 2021. In his inaugural address, published as “A Member-Centric Association” in the Journal of Dental Research, he discussed how the association could serve researchers across a wider range of disciplines. The organization had expanded its name from the American Association for Dental Research following a membership vote. Nör has also served as an associate editor of the Journal of Dental Research, a role he began in 2010.

== Honors and awards ==
- 1999 – Edward H. Hatton awards from the international and American dental research associations.
- 2001 – New Dentist Scientist Award from the American Dental Association Health Foundation.
- 2010 – Shared the William J. Gies Award for Biological Research for a study of blood vessel formation in head and neck tumors.
- 2011 – Shared the William J. Gies Award for Biological Research for the study of dentin-derived BMP-2 and odontoblast differentiation.
- 2012 – Distinguished Scientist Award in Pulp Biology and Regeneration from the International Association for Dental Research.
- 2013 – Fellow of the American Association for the Advancement of Science.
- 2017 – Fellow of the American Association for Dental Research.
- 2021 – Distinguished Faculty Research Mentoring Award from the University of Michigan School of Dentistry.
