= William Thomas Jefferson =

African American dentist (1864–1925)

- Born: August 4, 1864; Washington, D.C., US
- Died: October 26, 1925 (aged 61); Chicago, Illinois, United States
- Education: Doctor of Dental Surgery, Northwestern University Dental School, graduated 1881
- Occupation: Dentist
- Military career
- Allegiance: United States
- Branch: Illinois National Guard
- Service years: 1885–1916
- Rank: First lieutenant

William Thomas Jefferson, D.D.S. (August 4, 1864 – October 26, 1925) was the first Black dentist to practice dentistry in the United States Army during his military service in the Spanish–American War. He faced discrimination, exclusion, and caught malaria. He became an officer, served abroad, established a dentistry practice in Chicago, and served in the National Guard.

== Early life and education ==
William Thomas Jefferson was born in Washington, D.C., on August 4, 1864. The Jefferson family moved to Derby, Connecticut, soon after. Jefferson first started studying dentistry under Frederick B. Merrill in 1886. In 1889, he enrolled in the dentistry school at Howard University. His stay at Howard University was short, and he transferred to the American College of Dental Surgery, now the Northwestern University Dental School in Chicago. Jefferson graduated in 1891 with a Doctor of dental surgery. and subsequently established a practice in Chicago. Jefferson was a member of the Knights of Pythias of North America, South America, Europe, Asia, Africa and Australia.

== Military service ==
in 1895, Jefferson joined Company "D" 9th Battalion, a segregated unit in the Illinois National Guard. He was elected second lieutenant on May 1 of that year, and was subsequently promoted to first lieutenant on November 4, 1895.

The Spanish–American War marked a turning point in Jefferson's military service, and the status of dentistry in the military as a whole. For the first time, a large number of United States military personnel were serving outside North America. There were many reports of the oral-related health issues experienced by the American occupation soldiers in Cuba and the Philippines, but there were no dentistry-trained soldiers to provide care.

In addition, yellow fever had spread among the American troops and devastated their ranks. Thus, the United States Department of War deployed Black troops to Cuba and the Philippines, under the incorrect belief that Black people were immune to yellow fever. This false assumption came about during the 1793 Philadelphia yellow fever epidemic where it was thought that Black people were dying at lower rates from the disease than whites, though in actuality Black people died at the same rate as whites during the epidemic.

Jefferson was promoted to the Captain of D Company on July 21, 1898. With the onset of war, D Company was reorganized into the 8th Illinois Volunteer Infantry. In February 1899, Jefferson's unit was deployed to Cuba and stationed in San Luis. By September 21 of that year, he was diagnosed and hospitalized with malaria, but he continued to serve with his regiment in Cuba. During his deployment. Jefferson provided dental care to his own and two other Black regiments in addition to his line officer responsibilities. In 1899, Jefferson was discharged but he continued his military career in the Illinois National Guard as inspector of training for light infantry with the rank of First lieutenant. Jefferson concurrently served the Illinois National Guard while continuing his Chicago-based dentistry practice.

== Later life ==
In 1899, Jefferson wrote to Senator William E. Mason to obtain an endorsement for his application to create a "Colored Volunteer Regiment" for service in the Philippines. The endorsement was received and the application was sent to the Secretary of State at the time, Elihu Root, who rejected the application on the basis that such volunteer regiments were not necessary.

In 1901, President William McKinley signed an act calling for 30 contract dental surgeons to be attached to the Army Medical Department. Jefferson was the first Black dental surgeon to apply, however he was informed that a candidate from Illinois had already been chosen and that under the act, only one candidate from each state could be selected for appointment. In 1905, Jefferson was told that he was no longer eligible for appointment as a contract dental surgeon because he was over 30 years old. In general, many Black dentists applied for the contract dental surgeon position between 1901 and 1917, but they were all rejected. The office of the Surgeon General was not receptive to idea of Black medical officers until 1917 when the United States' foray into World War 1 necessitated them.

Jefferson continued to serve the Illinois National Guard until 1916. He died in Chicago on October 26, 1925.
