= Yuji Mishina =

Japanese molecular biologist

Yuji Mishina is a Japanese molecular biologist and dentistry academic.

Mishina completed his bachelor's, master's, and doctoral degrees, all in molecular biology, from the University of Tokyo, became a research associate at Yokohama City University in 1986, and moved to the United States in 1992 as a postdoctoral researcher affiliated with the MD Anderson Cancer Center. From 1998, Mishina worked for the National Institute of Environmental Health Sciences. In 2008, Mishina joined the University of Michigan School of Dentistry faculty as an associate professor. He was promoted to full professor in 2014, and in 2022, became associate director of the school's Oral Health Sciences PhD program as well as William R. Mann Professor of Dentistry.
