= Julia Claussen =

Swedish mezzo-soprano (1879–1941)

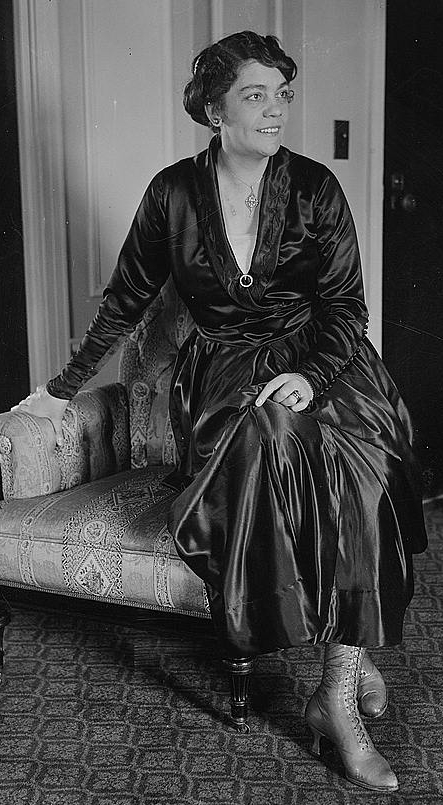
- Born: 11 June 1879; Stockholm
- Died: 1 May 1941 (aged 61); Stockholm
- Occupation: Singer

Julia Claussen (11 June 1879 – 1 May 1941) was a Swedish mezzo-soprano.

== Early life and education ==
Claussen was born on 11 June 1879 in Stockholm, Sweden. She was educated at the Royal Swedish Academy of Music in that city; she also studied at the Royal Academy in Berlin.

== Career ==
Claussen made her debut in La favorita in Stockholm on 19 January 1903, and remained with the Royal Swedish Opera for nine seasons. She sang at Covent Garden and in Paris, and appeared as Ortrud in Lohengrin in Chicago in 1913. She sang in Portland, Oregon in 1914, under the management of Alma Voedisch. She made several recordings in 1915. In 1916, she sang on the Chautauqua circuit, giving 119 recitals in twelve states. She toured in Scandinavia in 1920, was decorated by the King of Sweden, and gave a recital at New York's Aeolian Hall on her return to the United States. She gave a recital at Carnegie Hall in 1922.

Claussen made her Metropolitan Opera debut, as Delilah, on 23 November 1917. She was usually seen in Wagnerian roles, including Brunnhilde in Die Walküre, and Kundry in Parsifal, both in 1922. Fellow singer Rosa Ponselle also considered her Italian opera roles impressive, saying Claussen was "the ideal Amneris." Claussen remained with the Metropolitan Opera until her retirement in 1932, whereupon she returned to Stockholm. She also sang with the Philadelphia Civic Opera Company in the 1920s. She was vice-president of the National Opera Club of America.

In 1929, singer Lydia Lindgren sued Claussen for $250,000 for defamation. The suit was later dropped.

== Personal life ==
Claussen married Theodore Claussen in 1902, and had two daughters. The Claussen family were all naturalized as United States citizens in 1920. Julia Claussen died in Stockholm in 1941, aged 62 years.
