= Homer Judd =

American physician

Homer Judd (March 28, 1820 – May 20, 1890) was president of the American Dental Association (1868-1869) and the first dean (1866-1874) of the Missouri Dental College (which later became the Washington University School of Dental Medicine).
