= Jan Hu =

Taiwanese dentistry academic

Jan Ching Chun Hu is a Taiwanese dentistry academic.

== Career ==
Hu graduated from National Taiwan University in 1985 with a Bachelor of Dental Surgery. She moved to the United States to attend the University of Southern California, where she completed certification in pediatric dentistry in 1988 and earned a doctorate in craniofacial biology in 1990. Hu remained at USC as a postdoctoral researcher and later became an assistant professor. Between 1993 and 2002, Hu was affiliated with the University of Texas Health Science Center at San Antonio's Department of Pediatric Dentistry. She subsequently moved to the University of Michigan School of Dentistry, and was appointed to the full Samuel D. Harris Collegiate Professorship of Dentistry in 2006. Hu was named Charlotte Mistretta's successor as director of the school's Oral Health Sciences Ph.D. program in 2010. Hu was elevated to lead the Biologic and Materials Sciences and Prosthodontics Department in 2018. In 2022, Hu replaced Laurie McCauley as dean of the dentistry school on an interim basis.
