= Alma Voedisch =

American music manager

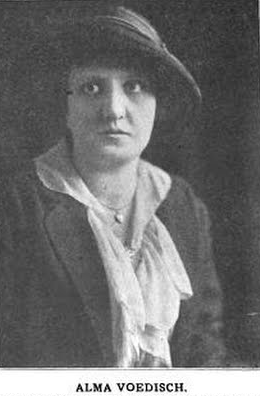
- Alma Voedisch, from a 1917 publication
- Born: June 23, 1878; Menomonie, Wisconsin
- Died: January 9, 1949 (aged 70); Chicago
- Occupation(s): Musicians' manager, tour agent

Alma Voedisch (June 23, 1878 – January 9, 1949) was an American musicians' manager and tour agent.

== Early life ==
Voedisch was born in Menomonie, Wisconsin, the daughter of Christian Voedisch and Eula (Julia) V. Koethke. Her parents were both born in Germany. She studied piano as a young woman.

== Career ==
Voedisch was business manager of the Western Musical Herald before 1912. She managed and booked musical acts in the midwest, including Julia Claussen, Yvonne de Tréville, Saba Doak, Theodore Spiering, George Hamlin, Theodora Sturkow-Ryder, and Leopold Godowsky. She also booked tours for the Minnesota Orchestra, the Ukrainian National Chorus, Sibyl Sammis-MacDermid, and the Boston Grand Opera. She opened an office for theatrical management in New York in 1917. She encouraged and supported the development of local music associations, and credited clubwomen for their flourishing: "Were it not for the women's clubs, which back attractions at considerable financial risk, appearances of world famous artists would be confined to only a few of the larger cities", she said in 1922.

Voedisch led her first group tour of Europe in 1926, touring factories and palaces, and attending concerts, pageants, and operas. She continued traveling in Europe annually into the late 1930s. She wrote about seeing Hitler and Mussolini in Nurnberg in 1937. In her later years she took charge of her family business, Voedisch Bros. Wholesale Sporting Goods, after her brothers died.

== Personal life ==
Voedisch died in Chicago in 1949, aged 70 years.
