= Willoughby D. Miller =

American dentist (1853–1907)

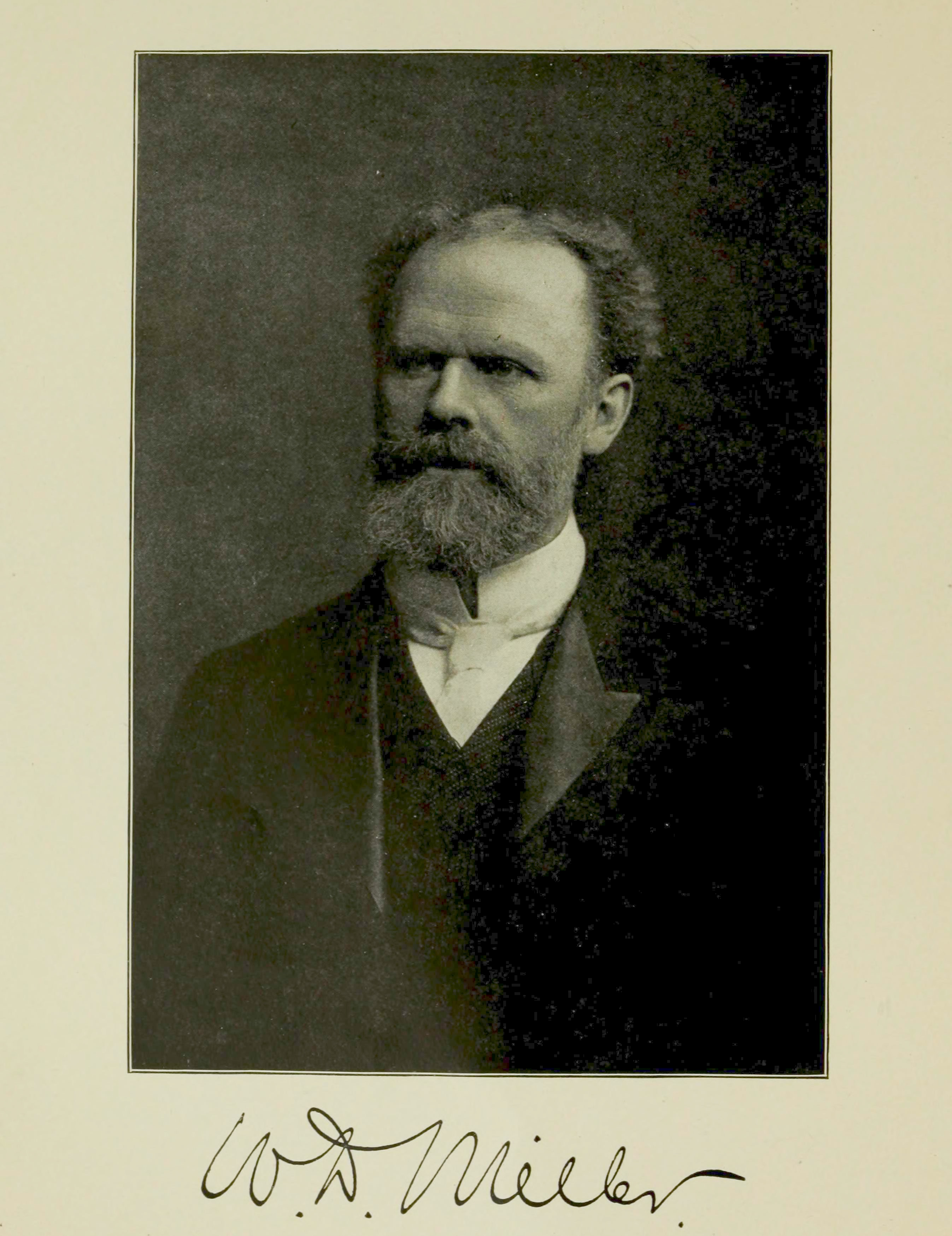
Willoughby Dayton Miller

Willoughby Dayton Miller (1853–1907) was an American dentist and the first oral microbiologist.

== Biography ==
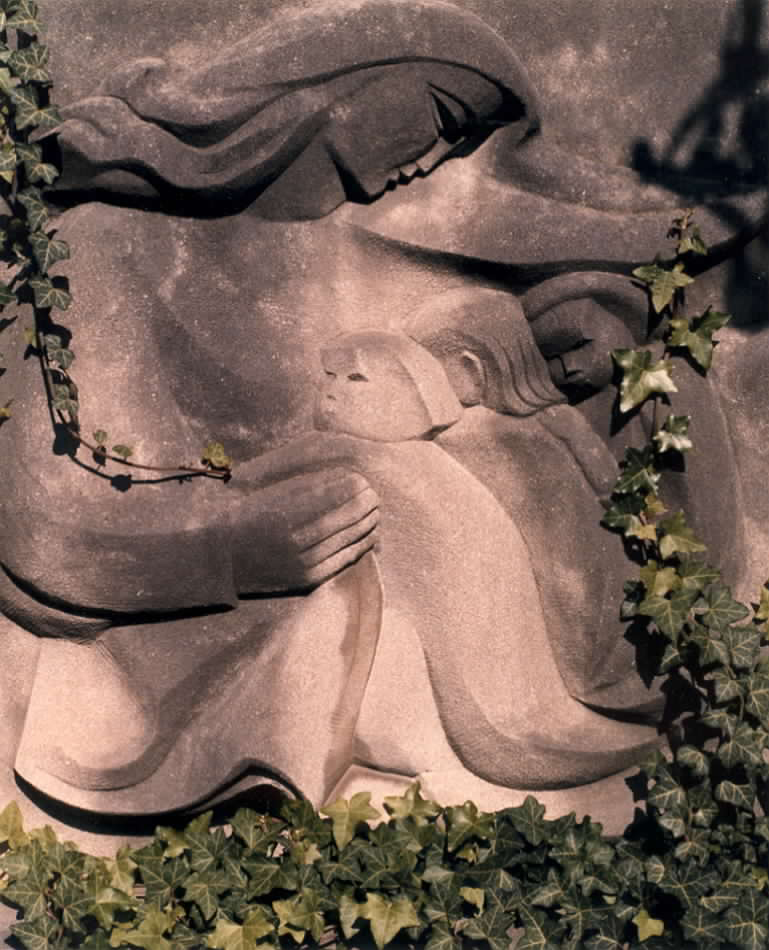
Willoughby D. Miller Memorial at the University of Michigan, by Samuel Cashwan

Willoughy D. Miller was born in Alexandria, Ohio, and studied mathematics and physics at the University of Michigan. He traveled to Edinburgh to continue his studies, but financial problems caused him to move to Berlin where he was assisted by an American dentist Frank Abbot. Miller later married Abbot's daughter, Caroline. Becoming interested in his father-in-law's profession, Miller returned to the United States to train as a dentist at the Pennsylvania Dental College. This college merged with the University of Pennsylvania Department of Dentistry in 1878, and Miller was one of the members of the first graduating class in 1879. After graduating, Miller returned to Berlin where he worked at first in Abbot's dental office and pursued his interest in the emerging science of microbiology. In his later years, he was appointed Dean of the University of Michigan School of Dentistry in 1906, but he died in 1907 following an operation for appendicitis, prior to assuming the position.

Miller worked during the golden age of microbiology. Pasteur had discovered that bacteria can ferment sugars into lactic acid, and another Frenchman, Emil Magitot, showed that fermentation of sugars could dissolve teeth in the laboratory. Bacteria had been observed inside carious dentin by Underwood and Miles in 1881, and these researchers also proposed that bacterial acids were necessary for removing the mineral of teeth. It was against this background that Miller developed his oral microbiological research, soon becoming appointed Professor of Operative Dentistry at the University of Berlin. He worked in the microbiological laboratory of Robert Koch in Berlin and began numerous research projects that introduced modern biological principles to dentistry. In 1890 Miller formulated the chemo-parasitic theory of caries (tooth decay). This theory held that caries is caused by acids produced by oral bacteria following fermentation of sugars. The principles of the chemo-parasitic theory were bolstered by the descriptions of bacterial plaque on tooth surfaces independently by GV Black and by JL Williams in 1898. The biomass of plaque helps localize acids at the tooth surface and prevent dilution by saliva. Miller thought that no single species of bacteria could cause caries. This idea was supplanted in the 1950s when the role of Streptococcus mutans as a primary pathogen in caries was established. More recent examination of the microbiology of carious lesions using 16S rRNA sequencing and high throughput DNA sequencing indicates that communities of diverse organisms may be more important than individual species.

A second major contribution of WD Miller was the focal infection theory. Miller proposed that oral microorganisms or their products have a role in the development of a variety of diseases in sites removed from the oral cavity, including brain abscesses, pulmonary diseases and gastric problems. Although Miller did not suggest removal of teeth to eliminate the focus of infection and advocated treating and filling root canals, the complete removal of teeth became accepted practice. As this rarely produced a positive health benefit, the concept of oral focal infection gradually lost credibility. However, in the 1980s epidemiological studies began to indicate an association between periodontal disease and coronary artery disease, and associations with other serious systemic conditions soon followed. It is now generally accepted that oral bacteria can gain access systemically and cause disease at remote sites, or cause a general perturbation of the immune system leading to disease. Once again Miller's contributions have been shown to be correct.
