= Glennon Engleman =

American hitman

- 1980 mugshot of Engleman
- Born: Glennon Edward Engleman; February 6, 1927; St. Louis, Missouri, U.S.
- Died: March 3, 1999 (aged 72); Jefferson City Correctional Center, Jefferson City, Missouri, U.S.
- Education: Washington University in St. Louis (DDS)
- Occupations: Dentist; Contract killer
- Spouses: Edna Ruth; Eda G. Vanhest; Ruth Jolley
- Status: Deceased
- Motive: Life insurance money
- Convictions: Federal; Damaging a vehicle in interstate commerce by means of an explosive Mail fraud Conspiracy to commit mail fraud Illinois; Murder (3 counts); Missouri; Capital murder (2 counts)
- Penalty: Federal; 60 years imprisonment Illinois; Life imprisonment Missouri; Life imprisonment
- Accomplice: Robert Handy

Details
- Victims: 7+
- Span of crimes: 1958–1980
- States: Illinois and Missouri
- Weapons: Rifle; sledgehammer; explosives
- Date apprehended: February 24, 1980

Glennon Edward Engleman (February 6, 1927 – March 3, 1999) was an American dentist, contract killer, and serial killer. A United States Army veteran, he planned and carried out at least five murders for monetary gain over 30 years. He was already serving two life sentences in a Missouri state prison when he pleaded guilty to the murder of a man and his wealthy parents in a separate contract killing in Illinois. Engleman was a sociopath, who once stated that his talent was killing without remorse, and that he enjoyed planning and carrying out killings and disposing of the remains for financial rewards. His first known killing occurred in collaboration with his ex-wife, Ruth. She remarried and took out a lucrative life insurance policy on her new husband, after which point Engleman killed him and the two split the settlement. Engleman would use this as his template for his later murders.

Engleman used his wealth, sexual magnetism, and charisma to manipulate women around him – ex-wives, lovers, and his dental assistant – into helping him formulate and carry out elaborate murder schemes. This led to one of his lovers, Barbara Boyle, being convicted as an accomplice and serving just under half of a 50-year sentence. Another accomplice, Robert Handy, was also convicted and served time in prison. Methods used to kill his victims included shooting, bludgeoning with a sledgehammer and explosives. The exact number of his victims is unknown.

He is the subject of Susan Crane Bakos' 1988 book Appointment for Murder. The cases against him were re-enacted in a two-part episode of the crime documentary series The FBI Files.

== Early life ==
Engleman was born the youngest of four children. He was raised in the middle class and lived in a nice home that his parents owned. Academically he was an above average student in school, but he didn't excel in any specific subject.

He graduated in dentistry at Washington University School of Dental Medicine, in 1954. He had been admitted under the GI Bill, having previously served in the US Army Air Corps.

== Known victims ==
1958: Engleman is suspected in the death of James Stanley Bullock, 27, a clerk for Union Electric Company of Missouri and part-time student shot near the Saint Louis Art Museum. Edna Ruth Bullock (née Ball) and James Bullock were married on June 28, 1958, and had been married for five and half months on the date he was murdered. Edna Ruth Bullock was Engleman's ex-wife prior to her marriage with James Bullock. She collected $64,000 (equivalent to $714,000 in 2025) from James Bullock's life insurance.

1963: Engleman is suspected in the murder of Eric Frey, a business associate of Engleman's at Pacific Drag Strip, a business in which Frey and Engleman were partners. Engleman struck Frey with a rock, pushed him down a well and used dynamite to blow him up afterwards. He then divided the insurance proceeds with Frey's widow.

1976: Peter J. Halm was shot in Pacific, Missouri. His wife, Carmen Miranda Halm, a former dental assistant trainee who had worked for Engleman and known him since childhood, ordered the hit to collect on a $60,000 (equivalent to $339,000 in 2025) life insurance policy on Halm. Engleman was convicted of capital murder for killing Halm and sentenced to life in prison with no possibility of parole for 50 years.

1977: Arthur and Vernita Gusewelle were killed by Englemen at their farmhouse near Edwardsville, Illinois, Arthur having been shot and Vernita having been bashed to death. Seventeen months later Engleman murdered the Gusewelles' son Ronald in East St. Louis, Illinois, in order for his widow Barbara Gusewelle Boyle to claim the millions in life insurance she had taken out on her husband Ronald, who was the sole heir to his parents' oil business. Boyle collected approximately $340,000 (equivalent to $1,810,000 in 2025) following her husband's murder. Boyle was convicted in her husband's murder but was acquitted of killing his parents. She was subsequently sentenced to 50 years in prison for the murder of her husband. She was released from the Dwight Correctional Center on October 10, 2009. Robert Handy, the accomplice, pleaded guilty to conspiring to commit the three Gusewelle killings and was sentenced to 14 years and served his time in prison. Engleman confessed to the three killings while in prison. He later pleaded guilty to the murders and received three life terms without parole.

1980: Sophie Marie Barrera, owner of South St Louis Dental Laboratory and to whom Engleman owed over $14,000 (equivalent to $55,000 in 2025), was killed in a car bomb explosion. On 25 September 1980, a jury in federal court found Engleman guilty of mail fraud and conspiracy to commit mail fraud in the murder of Barrera. He was sentenced to 30 years in prison for these charges. In a later trial, Engleman was also convicted of damaging a vehicle in interstate commerce by means of an explosive, also in relation to Barrera's death, and had 30 years added to his sentence. Engleman was accused of the murder by Barrera's son Frederick. Engleman was also convicted in state court of capital murder for killing Berrera, receiving a life sentence with no possibility of parole for 50 years after jurors spared him a death sentence.

== Family and death ==
Engleman was married twice, first to Edna Ruth and then to Ruth Jolley, with whom he had a son. His first wife Edna Ruth was never prosecuted for her complicity in the murder of her second husband, James Bullock, due to lack of evidence.

In March 1999, Engleman, 72, was pronounced dead in the infirmary of the Jefferson City Correctional Center, where he had a history of treatment for diabetes. A spokesman for the center said his death had been anticipated.

== In media ==
=== Books ===
- Appointment for Murder: Story of the Killing Dentist (1989), by Susan Crain Bakos.

=== Television ===
- Engleman's killings inspired the basis for the 1996 film, The Dentist.
- The story was told in the episode "Concealed Abscess" on the Investigation Discovery series Deadly Dentists, which aired December 8, 2017.

== See also ==
- List of serial killers in the United States
