= Miles Dewey Davis Jr. =

American dentist (1898–1962)

- Born: March 1, 1898; Noble Lake, Arkansas, U.S.
- Died: May 21, 1962 (aged 64); St. Louis, Missouri, U.S.
- Education: Arkansas State Normal School; Arkansas Baptist College (BS); Lincoln University; Northwestern University Dental School
- Occupations: Dentist; director; hog farmer
- Years active: 1924–1940s
- Organizations: Omega Psi Phi; National Medical Association; Prince Hall Freemasonry; Knights of Pythias; American Woodsmen; NAACP
- Spouse: Cloots Mae Henry (m. 1924; div. 1946) Josephine Davis (m. 1946)
- Children: 4, including Miles Dewey Davis III

Miles Dewey Davis Jr. (March 1, 1898 – May 21, 1962) was an American dentist and father of jazz trumpeter Miles Davis.

== Biography ==
Davis was born on March 1, 1898, in Noble Lake, Arkansas. He was a son of Miles Dewey Davis Sr. and Mary (Luster) Davis. He was educated at the Arkansas State Normal School (now University of Arkansas at Pine Bluff) in Pine Bluff, Arkansas, and received his Bachelor of Science degree at Arkansas Baptist College in Little Rock in 1919. His studies continued at Lincoln University in Chester County, Pennsylvania. In 1924, Davis graduated from Northwestern University Dental School in Chicago, Illinois, and began his practice the same year. He was a member of the Omega Psi Phi fraternity and the National Medical Association.

On June 16, 1924, he married Cloots Mae (or Cleota) Henry. This union produced three children:

- Dorothy Mae Davis (Mrs. Vincent Wilburn; May 10, 1925 – July 5, 1996)
- Miles Dewey Davis III (May 26, 1926 – September 28, 1991)
- Vernon Napoleon Davis (November 3, 1929 – December 15, 1999)

Davis moved the family to Alton, Illinois, and then to East St. Louis, Illinois, where he served as State Educational Director of the Elks Club. Very active socially and politically, he was also a member of the Prince Hall Freemasonry, Knights of Pythias of North America, South America, Europe, Asia, Africa and Australia, American Woodsmen, and the NAACP.

At one time, Davis made an unsuccessful bid for a seat on the Illinois State Legislature.

== Later years ==
In 1946, after his first marriage ended, Davis married his second wife, Josephine, who was an assistant principal. This union produced a son, Joseph, who was born in 1959.

In the late 1940s, Davis purchased a 160-acre (65 ha) estate in Millstadt, Illinois. He began raising imported Landrace hogs, the first African American to do so. Although he began breeding hogs as a hobby, he would raise over 300 on his estate at a time. He would sell between $14,000 and $21,000 worth of swine at a single auction. His hogs would also win numerous awards at state fairs in Missouri and Illinois.

Tennessee A&I (now Tennessee State University) president Walter S. Davis (no relation) initiated a program to encourage farmers to raise the superior quality Landrace hogs. He purchased his stock for the program from Miles Davis, who imported his strain from Winston Churchill's farm in England.

In 1962, Davis died in St. Louis of pneumonia, following a stroke.
