= James O. McNamara =

American Neuroscientist and neurologist

James McNamara
- Born: September 25, 1942 (age 82); Portage, Wisconsin
- Education: Marquette University; University of Michigan
- Occupations: Neurobiology; Neuroscience; Pharmacology
- Known for: mechanisms of epileptogenesis
- Medical career
- Field: Neuroscience, Neurology
- Institutions: Duke University School of Medicine

James O. McNamara (born September 25, 1942) is an American neurologist and neuroscientist, known for his research of epileptogenesis, the process underlying development and progression of epilepsy. He is the Duke School of Medicine Professor of Neuroscience in the Departments of Neurobiology, Neurology, and Pharmacology and Cancer Biology at Duke University. He served as chair of the Department of Neurobiology at Duke from 2002 to 2011

McNamara was named recipient of a Javits Neuroscience Investigator Award from the National Institute of Neurological Disease and Stroke in 1987 and of a second such award in 1994. He received a Freedom to Discover Award from the Bristol-Myers Squibb Foundation in 2001. He was elected to the American Academy of Physicians in 1997 and the National Academy of Medicine in 2005

McNamara has served professional and voluntary health organizations throughout his career including the Society for Neuroscience, the American Neurological Association, and the Epilepsy Foundation. He served as president of the American Epilepsy Society in 1994. He served on the neuroscience advisory panel of the Klingenstein Foundation from 1995 through 2020 and on the advisory board of the CURE Foundation from 2014 through 2017.

== Education ==
McNamara was born in Portage, Wisconsin and raised in Milwaukee. He received a Bachelor of Arts degree from Marquette University in 1964 and a Doctor of Medicine degree from the University of Michigan in 1968. He completed a medical internship and two years of Neurology residency at the University of Michigan in 1971. He served as a neurologist in the United States Army at Fort Hood, Texas from 1971 to 1973. After serving as Chief Resident of Neurology at Duke University in 1973, he conducted postdoctoral research training centered on myelin biochemistry with Stan Appel from 1974 to 1976. He completed a sabbatical studying molecular neurobiology in the laboratory of Stephen Heinemann at the Salk Institute from 1991 to 1992

== Career ==
Following postdoctoral research training, he joined the faculty as an assistant professor in the Department of Medicine (Neurology) at Duke and served as director of the epilepsy center at the Durham Veterans Affairs Medical Center from 1976 to 1986. In 1982 he founded the Duke Center for the Advanced Study of Epilepsy. He was promoted to associate professor in 1980 and full Professor in 1985. He was named Duke School of Medicine Professor of Neuroscience in the Departments of Medicine (Neurology), Neurobiology, and Pharmacology in 1993. In 2002 he was named Chair of the Department of Neurobiology at Duke University. He stepped down from the chair in 2011 and continues his research and teaching at Duke

== Research and work ==
His research has centered on mechanisms of epileptogenesis, the process underlying the development and progression of epilepsy. His work has demonstrated that seizure-induced activation of the receptor tyrosine kinase B (TrkB) by its ligand Brain Derived Neurotrophic Factor (BDNF) is required for epileptogenesis caused by seizures. Subsequent work elucidated the signaling pathway downstream of TrkB underlying epileptogenesis, namely phospholipase Cg1; this enabled discovery of a novel peptide inhibitor that inhibits epileptogenesis in multiple animal models of epilepsy.

== Awards and honors ==
- Javits Neuroscience Investigator Award (1987-1994, 1994–2001)
- Epilepsy Research Award, American Society of Pharmacology and Experimental Therapeutics (1987)
- Ciba-Geigy Award for VA Cooperative Study on Antiepileptic Drugs, International League Against Epilepsy (1987)
- Duke School of Medicine Professor of Neuroscience (1993–present)
- American Epilepsy Society Research Recognition Award, Basic Scientist (1994)
- Elected to the American Academy of Physicians (1997)
- Freedom to Discover Award, Bristol-Myers Squibb Foundation (2001-2006)
- Elected to the National Academy of Medicine (2005)
- C.J. Frederickson Prize of the International Society for Zinc Biology (2012)
- Elected Fellow, American Association for the Advancement of Science (2013)

== Publications ==
=== Selected papers ===
- Dingledine, Raymond; McBain, Chris J.; McNamara, James O. (August 1990). "Excitatory amino acid receptors in epilepsy". Trends in Pharmacological Sciences. 11 (8): 334–338. doi:10.1016/0165-6147(90)90238-4. PMID 2168104.
- Andrews, P. I.; Dichter, M. A.; Berkovic, S. F.; Newton, M. R.; McNamara, J. O. (January 1996). "Plasmapheresis in Rasmussen's encephalitis". Neurology. 46 (1): 242–246. doi:10.1212/WNL.46.1.242. ISSN 0028-3878. PMID 8559385. S2CID 27898862.
- Patel, Manisha; Day, Brian J.; Crapo, James D.; Fridovich, Irwin; McNamara, James O. (1996-02-01). "Requirement for Superoxide in Excitotoxic Cell Death". Neuron. 16 (2): 345–355. doi:10.1016/S0896-6273(00)80052-5. ISSN 0896-6273. PMID 8789949.
- Rogers, Scott W.; Andrews, P. Ian; Gahring, Lorise C.; Whisenand, Teri; Cauley, Keith; Crain, Barbara; Hughes, Thomas E.; Heinemann, Stephen F.; McNamara, James O. (1994-07-29). "Autoantibodies to Glutamate Receptor GluR3 in Rasmussen's Encephalitis". Science. 265 (5172): 648–651. Bibcode:1994Sci...265..648R. doi:10.1126/science.8036512. ISSN 0036-8075. PMID 8036512.
- Huang, Yang Z.; Pan, Enhui; Xiong, Zhi-Qi; McNamara, James O. (February 2008). "Zinc-Mediated Transactivation of TrkB Potentiates the Hippocampal Mossy Fiber-CA3 Pyramid Synapse". Neuron. 57 (4): 546–558. doi:10.1016/j.neuron.2007.11.026. PMID 18304484.
- Liu, Gumei; Gu, Bin; He, Xiao-Ping; Joshi, Rasesh B.; Wackerle, Harold D.; Rodriguiz, Ramona Marie; Wetsel, William C.; McNamara, James O. (July 2013). "Transient Inhibition of TrkB Kinase after Status Epilepticus Prevents Development of Temporal Lobe Epilepsy". Neuron. 79 (1): 31–38. doi:10.1016/j.neuron.2013.04.027. PMC 3744583. PMID 23790754.
- Gu, Bin; Huang, Yang Zhong; He, Xiao-Ping; Joshi, Rasesh B.; Jang, Wonjo; McNamara, James O. (November 2015). "A Peptide Uncoupling BDNF Receptor TrkB from Phospholipase Cγ1 Prevents Epilepsy Induced by Status Epilepticus". Neuron. 88 (3): 484–491. doi:10.1016/j.neuron.2015.09.032. PMC 4636438. PMID 26481038.
- Harward, Stephen C.; Hedrick, Nathan G.; Hall, Charles E.; Parra-Bueno, Paula; Milner, Teresa A.; Pan, Enhui; Laviv, Tal; Hempstead, Barbara L.; Yasuda, Ryohei; McNamara, James O. (October 2016). "Autocrine BDNF–TrkB signalling within a single dendritic spine". Nature. 538 (7623): 99–103. Bibcode:2016Natur.538...99H. doi:10.1038/nature19766. ISSN 0028-0836. PMC 5398094. PMID 27680698.

=== Book chapters ===
- Purves D., Augustine G.J., Fitzpatrick D, Hall W.C., LaMantia A.S., McNamara J.O. and White, L.E., eds. Neuroscience. Sinauer Associates: Sunderland, MA. 4th edition 2008.
- McNamara J.O. Drugs effective in the therapy of the epilepsies. In: Goodman & Gilman's The Pharmacological Basis of Therapeutics, (Hardman J.G. and Limbird L.E., eds.), McGraw Hill: New York. 12th edition 2011.
- McNamara J.O. and Gibbs J.W. The epilepsies: Phenotype and mechanisms. In: Basic Neurochemistry, (Siegel G. J., Albers, W., Brady, A.T. and Price, D. L., eds.), Elsevier: San Diego. 8th edition. 2012.
