= Benno Lischer =

American orthodontist (1876–1959)

- Born: Benno Edward Lischer; June 27, 1876; Mascoutah, Illinois
- Died: October 9, 1959 (aged 83)
- Education: Washington University in St. Louis
- Known for: First Dean of Washington University School of Dental Medicine, Former President of American Association of Orthodontists
- Medical career
- Profession: Dentist
- Sub-specialties: Orthodontics

Benno Edward Lischer (June 27, 1876 – October 9, 1959) was an American orthodontist who at one point was the president of American Association of Dental Schools and American Association of Orthodontists. He was the first full-time dean at Washington University School of Dental Medicine.
