= Charles Baker (English cricketer) =

English cricketer (1883–1976)

Personal information
- Full name: Charles Shaw Baker
- Born: 5 January 1883; Moss Side, Manchester, England
- Died: 16 December 1976 (aged 93); Lelant, Cornwall, England
- Batting: Left-handed
- Bowling: Leg-break and googly
- Role: Batsman

Domestic team information
- Years: Team
- 1905–1920: Warwickshire
- First-class debut: 8 May 1905 Warwickshire v Somerset
- Last First-class: 21 May 1920 Warwickshire v Middlesex

Career statistics
Competition	First-class
Matches	214
Runs scored	9244
Batting average	29.53
100s/50s	10/49
Top score	155*
Balls bowled	1462
Wickets	22
Bowling average	46.22
5 wickets in innings	–
10 wickets in match	–
Best bowling	4/59
Catches/stumpings	99/–
- Source: CricketArchive, 12 March 2014

Charles Shaw Baker (5 January 1883 – 16 December 1976) was an English cricketer who played first-class cricket for Warwickshire between 1905 and 1920. He was a left-handed middle-order batsman, an infrequent legbreak and googly bowler and on occasion a wicketkeeper. He was born at Moss Side in Manchester and died at Lelant, Cornwall.

Baker is recorded as playing for Warwickshire's second eleven in a non-first-class match in 1903. But he did not make his first team debut until the opening match of the 1905 season, when he established himself immediately with a score of 53 in the second innings of the game with Somerset. In only his fourth game, he scored 102 against Cambridge University. Though he did not make any further centuries in 1905, he retained his place in the side and totalled 956 runs at an average of 28.96. Wisden Cricketers' Almanack commented in its 1906 edition that he "showed capital form on many occasions", though it added that he was inclined to be a slow scorer.

Baker remained as a regular member of the Warwickshire first team right up to the First World War, and including the surprise County Championship triumph of 1911. His best season in terms of his batting average was 1906, when his 848 runs came at an average of 40.38. He headed Warwickshire's averages in the wet summer of 1907 and Wisden noted that he was "now quite one of the best left handed batsmen in the country"; it added that "he at times erred on the side of over-caution, but he proved on several occasions the possession of ability to hit very hard indeed". In both 1907 and 1908 Baker failed by just a few runs to achieve 1,000 runs in the season, but his batting fell back in 1909 and he averaged only 18.60 in that season before returning to form in 1910, when he scored exactly 1000 runs. The runs in 1910 included an unbeaten innings of 155 in the match against Worcestershire, made out of a total of 292, and this proved to be highest score of his first-class career.

Baker's part in Warwickshire's unexpected Championship victory in 1911 was a modest one, for he scored only 665 runs and was left out of the side for some matches in mid-season. He returned to better form in the wet summer of 1912 and in 1913 had his best season in terms of aggregate, scoring 1242 runs at an average of 33.56, and he passed 1000 runs again in the 1914 season. He returned to Warwickshire after the First World War, but had no success, appearing in two matches in each of the 1919 and 1920 seasons before retiring from first-class cricket.

After retiring from first-class cricket, Baker became a cartoonist, working for the Daily Express newspaper. Baker settled in Cornwall and from 1925 to 1931 he played Minor Counties cricket for Cornwall as an amateur, often referred to in the scorecards of the time as "Mr C. Shaw Baker" and sometimes captaining the team. He ran a market garden at Lelant, near St Ives, where he died aged 93 in 1976.
