= Charlie Baker (cricketer) =

Australian cricketer (born 1939)

Personal information
- Born: 24 March 1939 (age 87); Newcastle, New South Wales, Australia

Domestic team information
- Years: Team
- 1968/69: New South Wales
- Source: ESPNcricinfo, 22 December 2016

Charlie Baker (born 24 March 1939) is an Australian cricketer. He played two first-class matches for New South Wales in 1968/69.

== See also ==
- List of New South Wales representative cricketers
