= Charles Baker (surveyor) =

Charles Baker (5 October 1743—19 February 1835) was born in Virginia, and was a surveyor in Canada as his first recorded profession.

Baker was in Nova Scotia in 1765 as a deputy surveyor in the Chignecto region. After the American Revolution, he was active in the surveys which settled loyalists. In 1788 he settled in Amherst Township on an 800-acre (3.2 km^{2}) land grant he had received. There he became a justice of the peace and a clerk of the courts and by 1802 was a judge.

History records him as being a good magistrate and public servant. Through his various activities, he contributed significantly to the settlement and development of the areas where he lived.
