= Charles Baker (artist) =

American painter

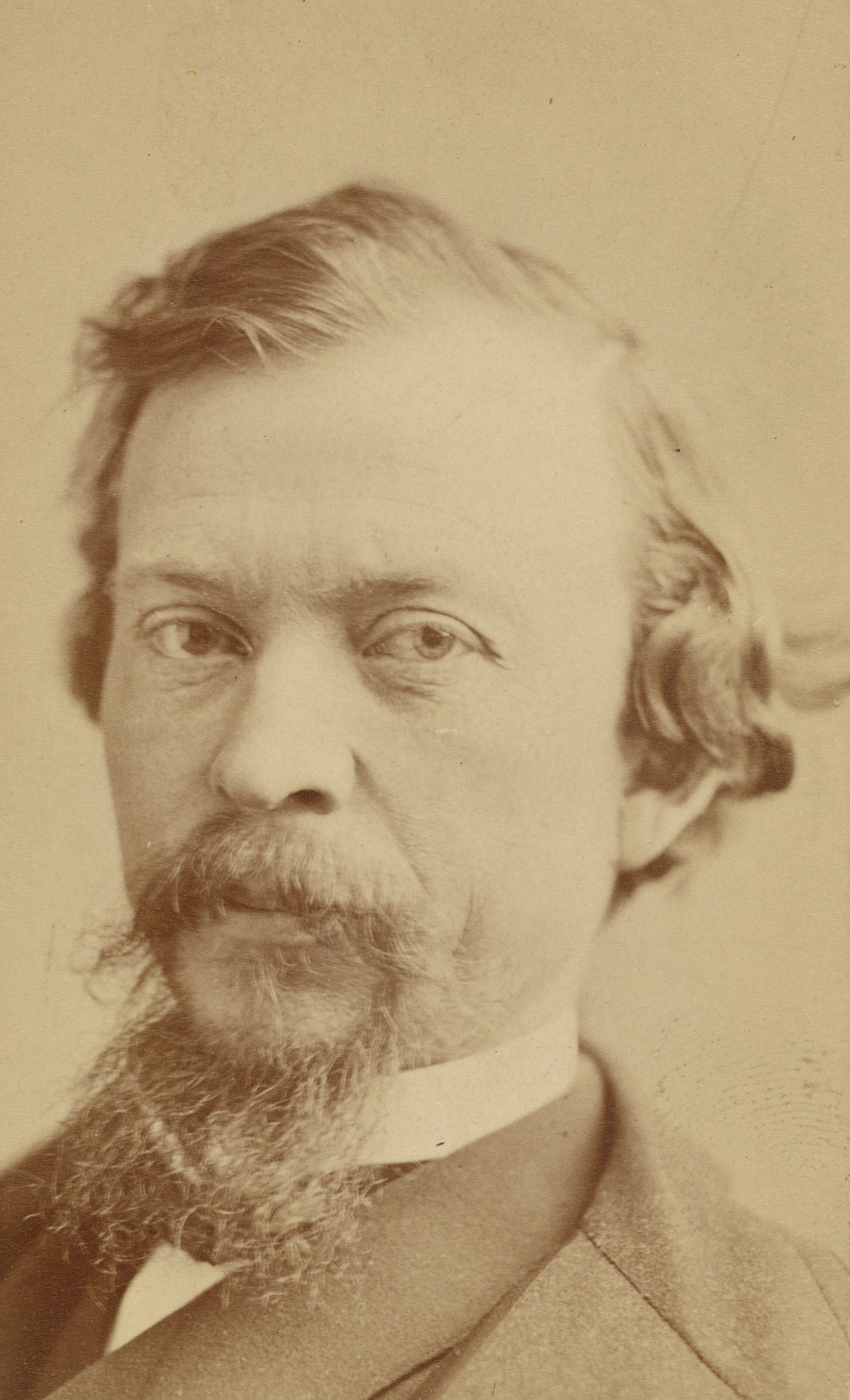
- Photograph attributed to Baker, c. 1875–1880
- Born: 1818; New York City, United States
- Died: 1888 (aged 69–70)
- Years active: 1839-1888
- Known for: Painting

Charles Baker (1818 – 1888) was a 19th-century American landscape painter. He was also active as a saddler, gunsmith, importer, and silver plate artisan. Baker exhibited at the National Academy from 1839 to 1873 and at the American Art-Union in 1847. He was one of the founders of the Art League of New York.

== Painting ==
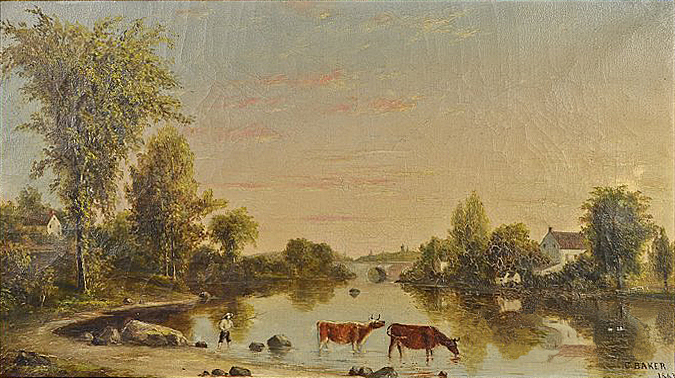
River Landscape with Cattle (1863)

Charles Baker worked in New York at the beginning of the Hudson River School movement. He created idyllic landscape paintings of an early American wilderness and particularly enjoyed painting the scenic vistas of the White Mountains in New Hampshire. He was deeply influenced by the dramatic work of Thomas Cole and painted in a romantic style clearly tied to Cole's sublime aesthetic. Art historians have suggested that he went so far as to produce copies of several of Cole's paintings.
