= Thomas M. Graber =

American orthodontist (1917–2007)

T. M. "Tom" Graber (May 27, 1917 – June 26, 2007) was an American orthodontist known for his contributions to the field of orthodontics. Graber wrote 28 books on orthodontics and dental anatomy. He also wrote chapters in more than 20 books and over 175 published articles.

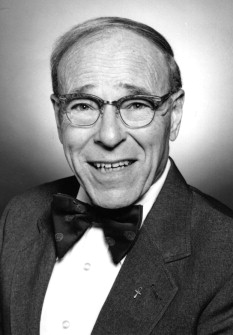
T.M. Graber. (Photo courtesy UIC College of Dentistry.)

== Life ==
Graber was born in 1917 in St. Louis and had five other siblings. He attended Soldan High School. He earned his dental degree from Washington University in St. Louis in 1940. Before learning orthodontics, Graber served as a captain in the United States Army Dental Command from 1941 to 1945 at Fort Bragg. He then earned his orthodontic degree from Northwestern University in 1946 and his PhD degree in anatomy in 1950.

He was a faculty member at University of Michigan School of Dentistry, University of Gothenburg, Northwestern University (1946–58), University of Chicago (1969–82) where he was head of orthodontics, and University of Illinois Chicago from 1994 until his death.

He was married to Doris Graber, who was a professor of political science at University of Illinois Chicago. They had five children, including Lee Graber.

== Career ==
Graber founded the Kenilworth Research Foundation and was the director of the CE for the Greene Vardiman Black Institute since 1967. He was also the director of dental continuing education for University of Chicago from 1971 to 1981, founded the Northwestern University's Cleft Lip and Palate Institute along with the orthodontic program at University of Chicago Medical School, founded the Audiovisual Council of AAO in 1962, and was a founding member of Illinois Society of Orthodontists.

Graber's research in his early years focused on the treatment of birth defects. Later in this career, his research focused on growth and development issues related to jaws as well as treatment modalities for clicking in jaws. Graber did research on craniofacial anomalies, cleft palate, cleft lip, temporomandibular joint anatomy and disturbances, orthopedic growth guidance of the dentofacial complex, and the use of magnetic force in orthodontics and dentofacial orthopedics. He was a founding member of the Council on Orthodontic Education for the American Association of Orthodontists and also served as President of the Chicago Society of Orthodontists, the Edward H. Angle Society, and the Illinois Orthodontists Society.

He received more awards than any orthodontist in history, including the Emperor of Japan's Order of the Sacred Treasure, the highest Japanese award ever bestowed upon a non-citizen of Japan.

Graber founded the World Journal of Orthodontics in 2000. The Grabler Seminar Room in the University of Illinois at Chicago College of Dentistry's Department of Orthodontics is named for him.

Over his lifetime, Graber served on editorial boards of 15 journals, and was an honorary member of more than 20 international orthodontic associations. He died at the age of 90 in Evanston, Illinois. At the time of his death, he remained editor-in-chief of the World Journal of Orthodontics.

== Positions ==
- Chicago Society of Orthodontists, president
- Edward Angle Society, president
- Illinois Orthodontists Society, president
- Royal College of Surgeons of England, fellow, 1996
- American Journal of Orthodontics and Dentofacial Orthopedics, editor-in-chief, 1985–2000
- World Journal of Orthodontics, founder and editor-in-chief, 2000–07

== Awards ==
- Emperor of Japan's Order of the Sacred Treasure, 2005 – Highest Japanese award ever bestowed upon a non-citizen of Japan
- Albert H. Ketcham Award, 1975
- AAO Distinguished Service Award, 1970
- Honorary Degrees from University of Michigan, Washington University, Aristotle University, Kunming Medical University, University of Gothenburg
