= Animal models of epilepsy =

Animal models of epilepsy have helped to advance the understanding of how normal brains develop epilepsy (a process known as Epileptogenesis), and have been used in pre-clinical trials of antiepileptic drugs. Epilepsy is a set of syndromes which have in common a predisposition to recurrent epileptic seizures. Animal models of epilepsy and seizures can be divided into four basic categories: genetic animal models, chemically induced models, electrically induced models, and in more recent years infection-induced models. New models are using light-gated ion channels to turn on cell firing and these are part of optogenetic induction models of epilepsy.
