= Earl Emanuel Shepard =

American orthodontist

Earl Emanuel Shepard (September 1908 – May 1991) was an American orthodontist who is known for his contributions in the field of orthodontics. He was director of the American Board of Orthodontics for 10 years. American Association of Orthodontics has an award named after Shepard which is given every year to orthodontists who have shown distinguished service in the field of orthodontics.

== Life ==
He was born in Marine, Illinois, on September 3, 1908. He graduated from Washington University School of Dental Medicine in their first class. He then established his private practice in Edwardsville, Illinois. In 1941, he established an orthodontic practice with Leo B. Lundugan from 1938 to 1941. He then was enlisted into army in 1941, where he was a captain and then a major and a colonel. During World War II in 1942, he was director of the dental services in the 40th Station Hospital in Mostaganem, Algeria. After he served three years in the war, he was awarded the Bronze Star Medal and an Army Commendation. He then returned to teaching at Washington University in St. Louis in the Department of Orthodontics for next 60 years. He became a professor and then the chairman of orthodontic department from 1953 to 1975. He co-wrote a textbook with James E. McCoy called Applied Orthodontics. He also wrote a book on his hometown called Marine, Illinois – An Historical Review.

He died on May 18, 1991, due to a cerebral hemorrhage. He was married to Wilma A. Shwartz.

== Awards and recognition ==
- Bronze Star Medal recipient
- Distinguished Service Scroll by American Association of Orthodontists in 1983
- Executive director of American Board of Orthodontics – 1977
- Albert H. Ketcham Award
