= Charlie Baker (English footballer) =

English footballer

Personal information
- Full name: Charles Joseph Baker
- Date of birth: 6 January 1936 (age 90)
- Place of birth: Turners Hill, England
- Position: Goalkeeper

Senior career*
Years	Team	Apps	(Gls)
- Turners Hill
- Horsham
1960–1964	Brighton & Hove Albion	81	(0)
1964–1966	Aldershot	28	(0)
1966–196?	Crawley Town		
- * Club domestic league appearances and goals

Charles Joseph Baker (born 6 January 1936) is an English former footballer who made more than 100 Football League appearances playing as a goalkeeper for Brighton & Hove Albion and Aldershot.

== Life and career ==
Baker was born in Turners Hill, Sussex, in 1936. He played local football while completing an apprenticeship as a toolmaker and his National Service with the RAF before joining Brighton & Hove Albion in 1960. He made 81 league appearances over four seasons, which included 18 months as regular first choice, but remained a part-time player while working for a Crawley-based engineering company. He then played a further 28 league matches for Aldershot before returning to non-league football with Crawley Town.
