= Greene Vardiman Black =

American dentistry pioneer (1836–1915)

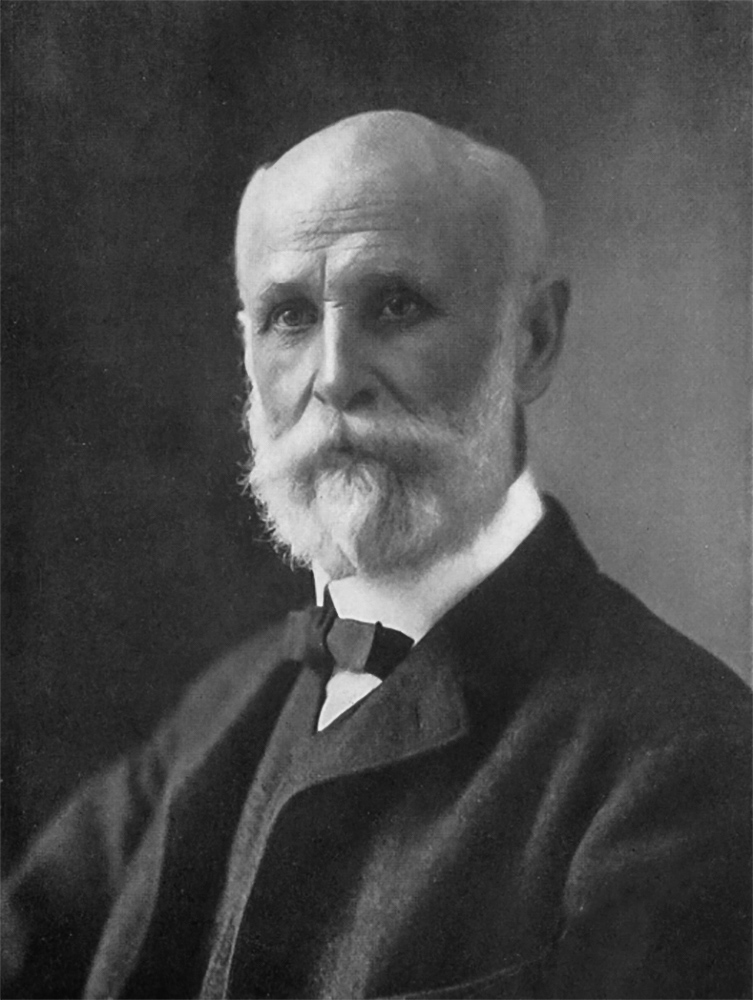
- Born: August 3, 1836; Winchester, Illinois, US
- Died: August 31, 1915 (aged 79); Jacksonville, Illinois, US
- Occupation: Professor

Academic work
- Discipline: Dentistry
- Sub-discipline: Operative dentistry
- Institutions: University of Iowa; Northwestern University Dental School

Greene Vardiman Black (August 3, 1836 – August 31, 1915) was an American dentist and academic. He was one of the founders of modern dentistry in the United States. He is also known as the father of operative dentistry.

== Early life ==
Black was born near Winchester, Illinois on August 3, 1836 to William and Mary Black. He spent his early life on a farm and quickly developed an interest in the natural world. By the age of 17, Black began studying medicine with the help of his brother, Dr. Thomas G. Black. In 1857, he met Dr. J.C. Speer, who taught him the practice of dentistry.

== Career ==
After the Civil War, in which he served as a union scout, he relocated to Jacksonville, Illinois in 1864. It was here that he began an active career and research in the developing field of dentistry. He studied dentistry for 20 months (as was common at the time) followed by an apprenticeship He taught in the Dental Department at the University of Iowa, beginning at 1890 before moving to Chicago.

He researched many important topics to dentistry, including the cause of dental fluorosis and ideal cavity preparations. One of his many inventions was a foot-driven dental drill. He is also known for his principles of tooth preparations, in which he outlines the proper methods to prepare teeth for fillings. These cavity preparations used principles of engineering and material sciences to maximize strength and retention of the amalgam filling and minimize fractures as well as tooth anatomy, to minimize pulp exposure. The phrase, "extension for prevention," is still famous in the dental community today and represents Black's idea that dentists should incorporate more grooves and pits than those currently exhibiting decay as a preventive measure against those grooves and pits developing tooth decay in the future, although today ideas have changed and focus much more on minimal intervention. Black published his concepts and ideals in his text Manual of Operative Dentistry in 1896.

Further, he organized 'Black's Classification of Caries Lesions' which is still in use today. Since that time, only one more category has been added to his classification system.

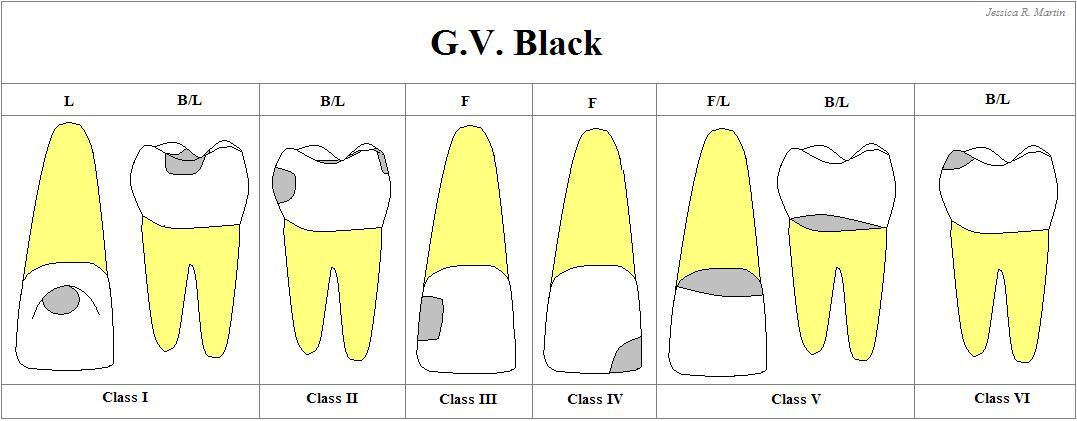
GV Black Classification of Restorations

Black's Classification of Caries Lesions:

- Class I Caries affecting pits and fissures on occlusal third of molars and premolars, occlusal two thirds of molars and premolars, and Lingual part of anterior teeth.
- Class II Caries affecting proximal surfaces of molars and premolars.
- Class III Caries affecting proximal surfaces of central incisors, lateral incisors, and cuspids without involving the incisal angles.
- Class IV Caries affecting proximal including incisal angles of anterior teeth.
- Class V Caries affecting gingival 1/3 of facial or lingual surfaces of anterior or posterior teeth.
- Class VI (never described by Black, added later by W J Simon in 1956) Caries affecting cusp tips of molars, premolars, and cuspids.

In addition to developing a standard for cavity preparations, Black also experimented with various mixtures of amalgam. After years of experimentation, Black published his balanced amalgam formula in 1895. This formula and its variations quickly became the gold standard and would remain such for almost 70 years.

Black was the second Dean of Northwestern University Dental School, where his portrait hung until the school's closure in 2001.

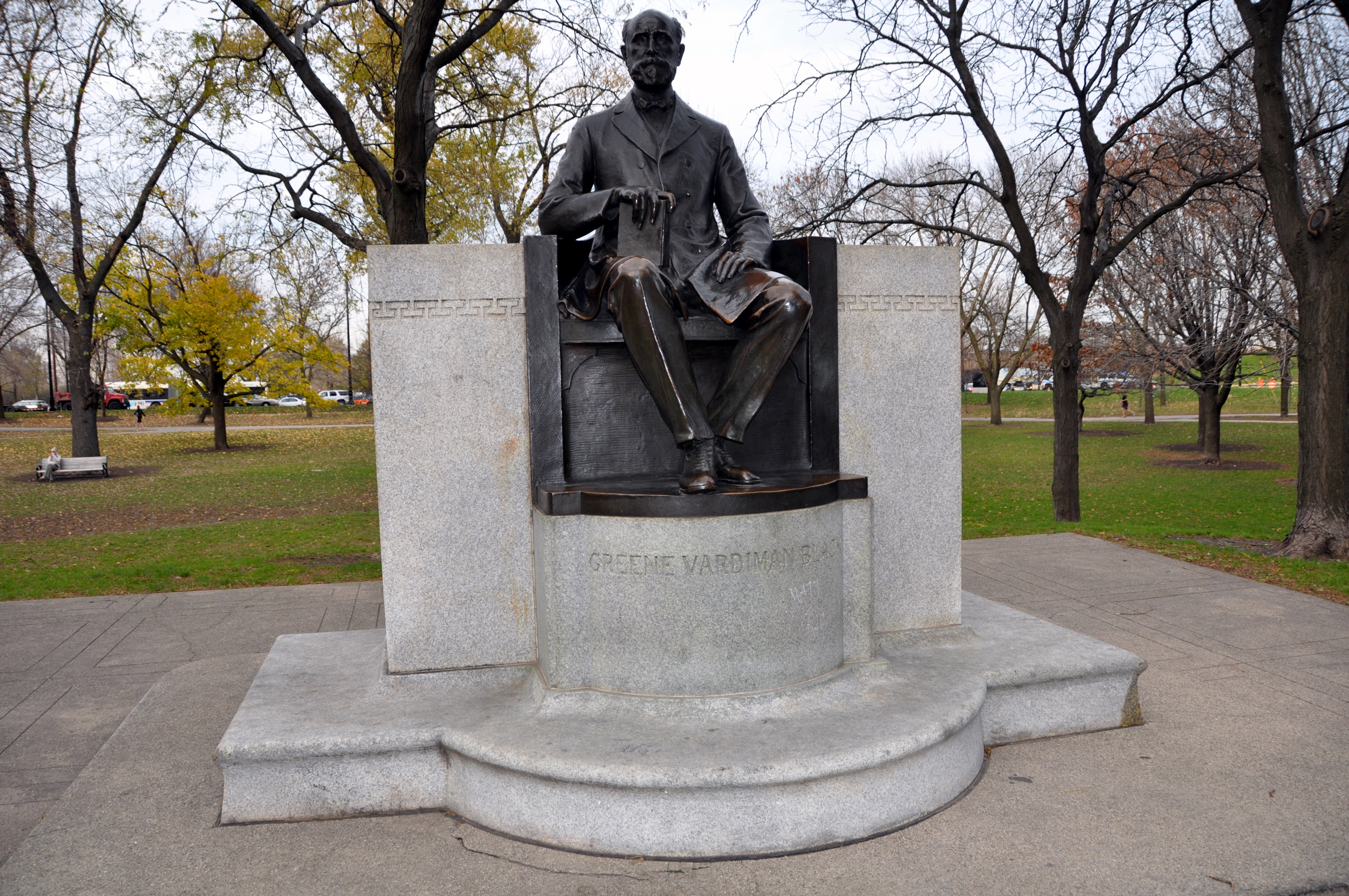
GV Black Statue in Lincoln Park

== Honors ==
Black is considered the father of modern dentistry. His statue can be found at the very southern edge of Chicago's Lincoln Park, at North Avenue, facing down Astor Street. He was also inducted in the International Hall of Fame of Dentistry of the Pierre Fauchard Academy on February 25, 1995.

== Personal life ==
Black died from pernicious anemia on his farm in Jacksonville, Illinois on August 31, 1915, at the age of 79 years.

Black’s son, Arthur continued dental research, gaining academic and political support for the importance of the sciences in dental education, and making university education mandatory for dentists.

== Bibliography ==
- Joseph R. "The Father of Modern Dentistry - Dr. Greene Vardiman Black (1836–1915)". J Conserv Dent 2005;8:5-6
