= Charles A. Baker =

American talent manager (c.1921–1991)

Charles Adams Baker (c. 1921 – March 15, 1991) was an American talent manager.

== Biography ==
Born c. 1921, in Chicago, Baker studied at Harvard College and earned a bachelor's degree. He enlisted to the United States Navy during World War II, and was primarily stationed on ships in the North Sea. He left the military ranked a lieutenant.

Following the war, Baker joined the Music Corporation of America as an agent. As a talent manager, he worked for Angela Lansbury, Eva Marie Saint, Jack Lemmon, Jed Harris, Robert Preston, and Walter Matthau. From 1950 to 1974, he worked for the William Morris Agency, and from 1973 to 1980, worked for Macmillan Inc., a publishing company. In 1976, he supervised the creation of the musical Candide. Its script was written by Hugh Wheeler and it wasscored by Leonard Bernstein; John La Touche, Stephen Sondheim, and Richard Wilbur were its songwriters.

In his later life, Baker lived in Manhattan. He died on March 15, 1991, aged 70, in New York City, of liver cancer.
