= Thomas Lewis Gilmer =

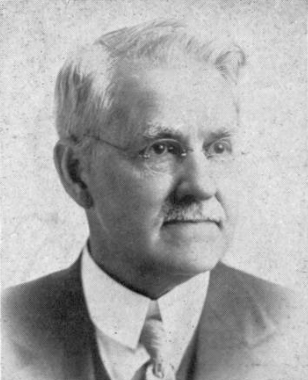
- Born: February 19, 1849; Lincoln County, Missouri
- Died: December 28, 1931 (aged 82); Los Angeles, California
- Education: Washington University in St. Louis; Quincy University
- Occupation: Oral surgeon
- Spouse: Ella M. Bostick (m. 1869)
- Children: 1

Thomas Lewis Gilmer (1849–1931) was an American oral surgeon who was the founder of Northwestern University Dental School and Institute of Medicine in Chicago. Gilmer made several contributions in oral surgery, such as the Gilmer splint and Gilmer wiring, which are named after him.

== Life ==
He was born in Lincoln County, Missouri on February 19, 1849. He attended Missouri Dental College and obtained his dental degree in 1882. He attended Quincy College of Medicine and obtained his Medical Degree in 1885. He then served as an oral surgeon at St. Mary's Hospital in Quincy, Illinois. Along with practicing, he was also the professor of histology at Quincy College of Medicine. Gilmer then moved to Chicago in 1889 where he was a professor of oral surgery at the Chicago Dental Infirmary. In 1891, he founded the Northwestern University Dental School. Gilmer served as a dean of the school eventually. He also founded the Institute of Medicine, Chicago.

He was married to Ella M. Bostick in 1869, and they had a daughter.

Gilmer died in Los Angeles on December 28, 1931.

== Awards and positions ==
- Illinois State Dental Society – president (1883)
- Quincy College of Medicine – faculty
- Chicago College of Dental Surgery – faculty (1889)
- Northwestern University Dental School – founder (1891), dean, professor
- Institute of Medicine, Chicago – founder, president
- Honorary Sc.D. Degree by Northwestern University (1911)
