= University of Michigan School of Dentistry =

Dental school of the University of Michigan

- Type: Public dental school
- Established: 1875; 151 years ago
- Parent institution: University of Michigan
- Dean: Jacques E. Nör
- Faculty: 486 (143 full-time, 343 part-time)
- Students: 704 (68 B.S., 115 M.S., 433 D.D.S., 60 ITDP, 15 Ph.D
- Location: Ann Arbor, Michigan, U.S.
- Campus: City
- Website: dent.umich.edu

The University of Michigan School of Dentistry is the dental school of the University of Michigan, a public research university located in Ann Arbor, Michigan. Established in 1875, the School of Dentistry engages in oral and craniofacial health care education, research, patient care and community service.

The University of Michigan was the first state university in the world and the second university in the United States to offer education in dentistry. (Harvard was the first). The University of Michigan was also the first to provide graduate-level dentistry education. Four of its faculty members have been elected president of the American Dental Association.

The Sindecuse Museum of Dentistry is housed within the School of Dentistry.

== Academics ==
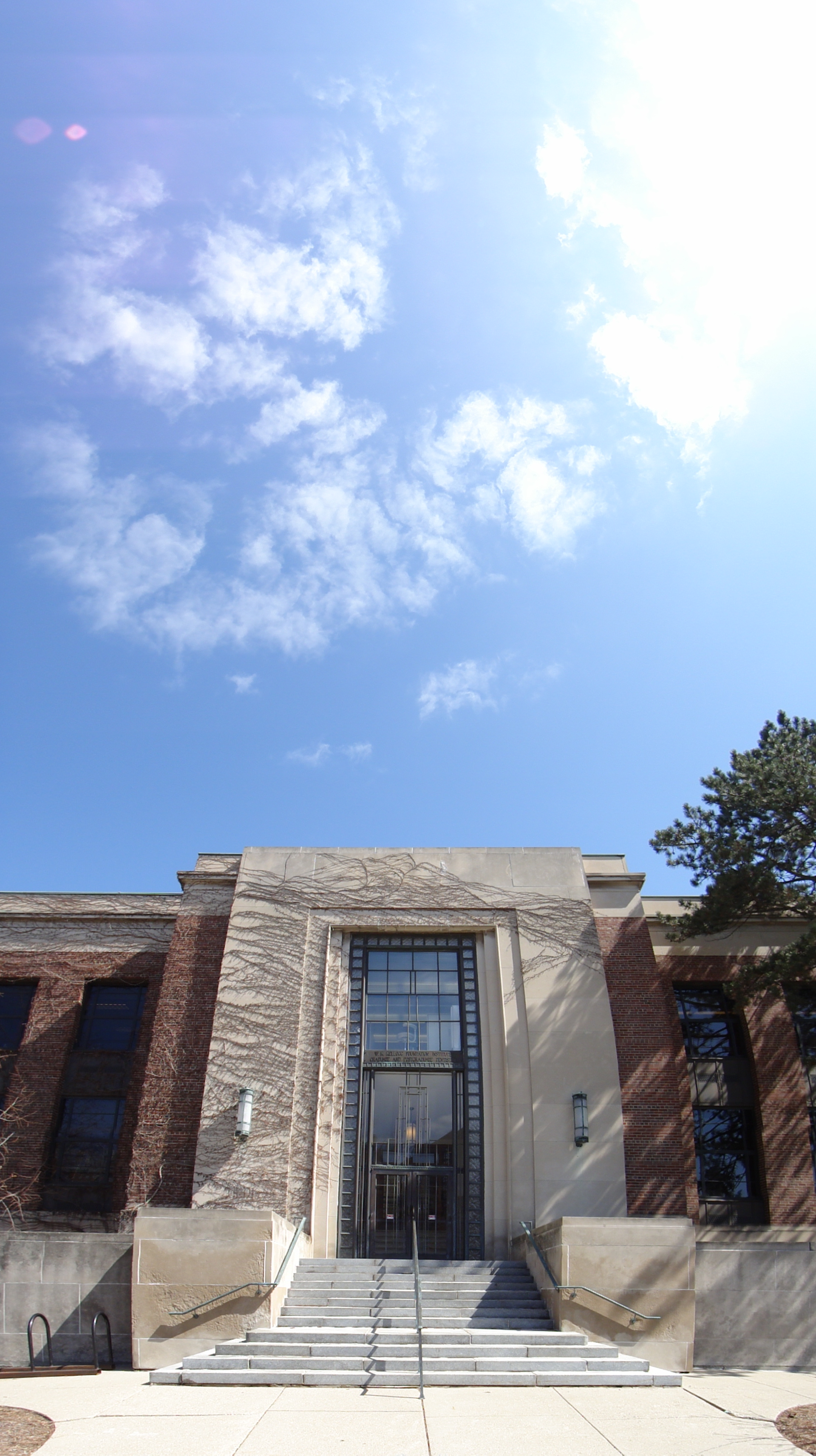
W.K. Kellogg Building

The student body consists of 693 students. The School of Dentistry has:

- The undergraduate Bachelor of Science (B.S.) in Dental Hygiene program, which has 68 students;
- The Doctor of Dental Surgery (D.D.S.) program, which has 433 students; and
- 115 Master of Science (M.S.) students and 20 Ph.D students.

There are 143 full-time faculty and 343 part-time faculty. The average class size is 109 for the D.D.S. program and 30 for the B.S. dental hygiene program.

Fields of study at the School of Dentistry include dental hygiene, oral health, biomaterials, endodontics, computerized dentistry, oral and maxillofacial surgery, orthodontics, pediatric dentistry, periodontics, prosthodontics, and restorative dentistry.

Among the student organizations at the School of Dentistry are the Alpha Omega, American Association of Women Dentists, the American Student Dental Association, the Christian Medical/Dental Society, Dental LGBA, Delta Sigma Delta, Hispanic Dental Association, Muslim Student Dental Association, Society of the American Indian Dentist, Student Council, Student National Dental Association, Student Research Group (SRG), Jonathan Taft Society, UM Asian Dental Student Organization, and Xi Psi Phi.

The School's dental hygiene and D.D.S. programs are both accredited by the American Dental Association.

The University of Michigan School of Dentistry is one of two dental schools in Michigan; the other is the University of Detroit Mercy School of Dentistry.

The average undergraduate GPA of the entering D.D.S. class at the School of Dentistry is 3.82, with a DAT score of 22.

== Departments ==
The University of Michigan School of Dentistry has the five academic departments:

- Department of Biologic and Materials Sciences and Prosthodontics (BMSP)
- Department of Cariology, Restorative Sciences and Endodontics (CRSE)
- Department of Orthodontics and Pediatric Dentistry (OPD)
- Department of Oral and Maxillofacial Surgery / Hospital Dentistry (OMFS-HD)
- Department of Periodontics and Oral Medicine (POM)

== History ==
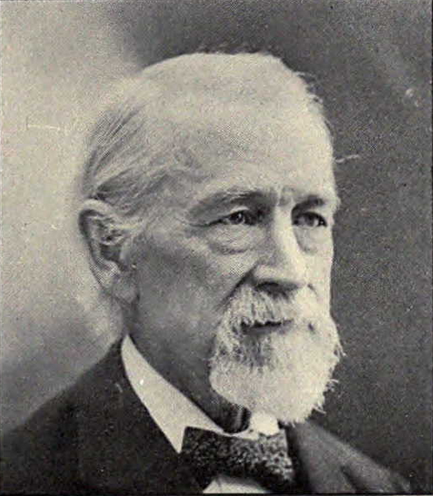
Jonathan Taft, c. 1902. Taft was the first dean of the School of Dentistry.

The first dean of the School of Dentistry was Dr. Jonathan Taft, who was dean from the school's founding in 1875 until his retirement in 1903. Taft developed the four-year model of dental education, which later became standard in American dental schools.

The School of Dentistry was established as the College of Dental Surgery by the University of Michigan Board of Regents, following an appropriation by the Michigan Legislature of $3,000 for that purpose. The school's first class consisted of 20 students taught by three faculty members. The first women graduated from the school in 1880. In 1890, the school became the first dental school to provide graduate dental education. Also in 1890, Ida Rollins became the first African-American woman to earn a dental degree in the United States, which she earned from the school.

In 1910, Russell W. Bunting, later dean of the school, began his research into the causes and prevention of dental caries (cavities). In 1921, the school established its dental hygiene program and conferred its first Master of Science degree, and the following year, the school became the first to offer graduate-degree training in orthodontics. In 1927, the school adopted its current name.

In 1938, the school and the W.K. Kellogg Foundation began to develop plans for a new, purpose-built dental school building. Construction of the Kellogg Building began the following year.

In 1938, the School of Dentistry developed the first graduate program in dental public health in the United States under the leadership of Professor Kenneth A. Easlick. In 1945, the School worked with city officials in Grand Rapids, Michigan to establish a water fluoridation program, one of the first in the United States.

In 1957, plans for a new dental building attached to the Kellogg Building were released. Construction began in 1966 on the project; at the time, the building contract of $17.3 million was the largest in university history. The new building on North University Avenue was dedicated in 1971.

In 1965, researchers from the School of Dentistry made their first trip to Egypt to study the orthodontics of ancient Egypt and Nubia. In 1976, researchers from the school discovered the 3,000-year-old mummy of Tiye, a Great Royal Wife to the Egyptian pharaoh Amenhotep III; the mummy's identity was confirmed by tests at the School of Dentistry.

In 1967, the school established the Dental Research Institute, one of five nationwide funded by the National Institute of Dental Research. In 1972, the school established its summer dental community outreach clinics in Adrian and Stockbridge, Michigan; the program expanded to the Traverse City area in the following year.

In 1975, Jessica Rickert became the first female American Indian dentist in America upon graduating from the school. She was a member of the Prairie Band Potawatomi Nation, and a direct descendant of the Indian chief Wahbememe (Whitepigeon).

In 1998, renovations to the Kellogg Building began. On 1999, the school awarded its first two doctoral degrees in oral health sciences. In 2000, the school became the first in the nation to host the "Scientific Frontiers in Clinical Dentistry" program, with more than 1,500 dentists from across the country attending. The same year, the school announced five new community partnerships to provide oral health care services to the underserved across Michigan.

The school became the center of a lawsuit regarding disability accommodations and students' rights. In December 2008, a federal jury awarded $1.72 million to former University of Michigan dental student Alissa Zwick, concluding that her due process rights were violated when she was dismissed from the School of Dentistry in 2005. The jury's decision included $1 million in punitive damages and $500,000 for emotional distress. Zwick was expelled during her third year due to alleged academic deficiencies, which she contended were the result of internal faculty conflicts. Following the verdict, the university settled the case in 2009 for $1 million, allocating $673,000 to Zwick and $327,000 for her legal fees. At the time of the settlement, Zwick was pursuing a master's degree in speech pathology at Eastern Michigan University.

== People ==
=== Deans ===
The following people have served as deans of the School of Dentistry:

- 1875–1903: Jonathan Taft
- 1903–1906: Cyrenus G. Darling (acting)
- 1907: Willoughby D. Miller
- 1907–1916: Nelville Hoff
- 1916–1934: Marcus Llewellyn Ward
- 1934–1935: Chalmers John Lyons
- 1935–1950: Russell W. Bunting
- 1950–1962: Paul H. Jeserich
- 1962–1981: William R. Mann
- 1981–1982: Robert E. Doerr (acting)
- 1982–1987: Richard L. Christiansen
- 1987–1989: William Kotowicz (acting)
- 1989–1995: J. Bernard Machen
- 1995–2002: William Kotowicz
- 2003–2013: Peter Polverini
- 2013–2022 Laurie K. McCauley
- 2022–2023 Jan Ching Chun Hu (acting)
- 2023–present Jacques Eduardo Nör

=== Notable alumni ===
- Ida Rollins, Class of 1890
- Joseph Jarabak, Class of 1930

== Gallery ==
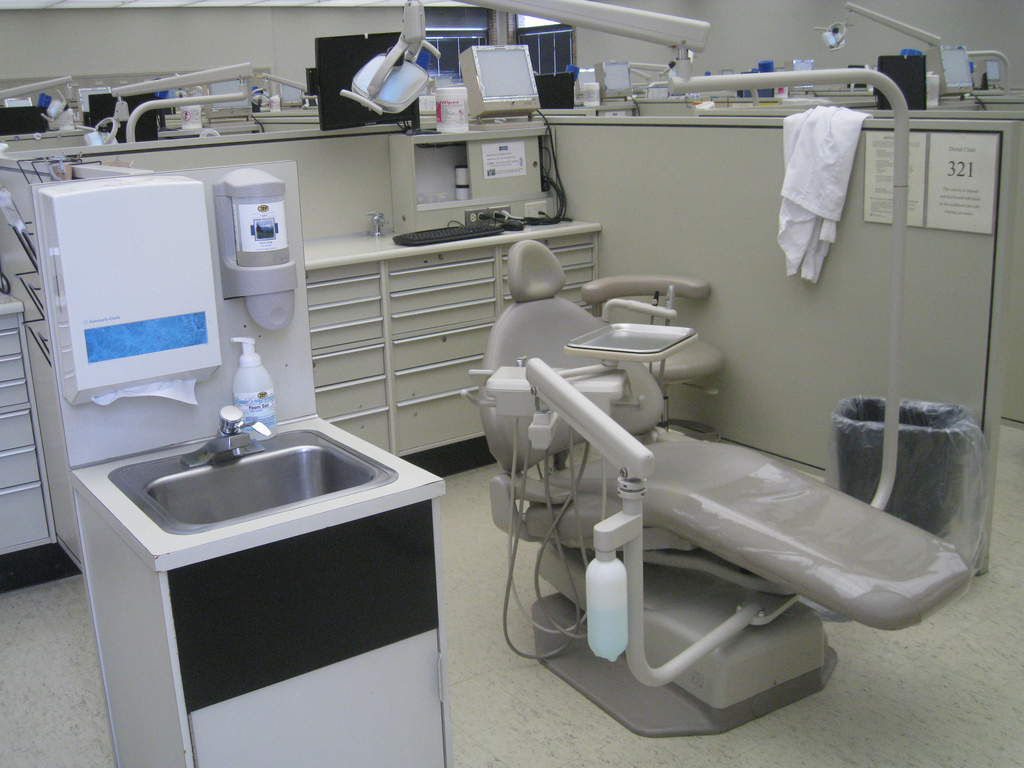

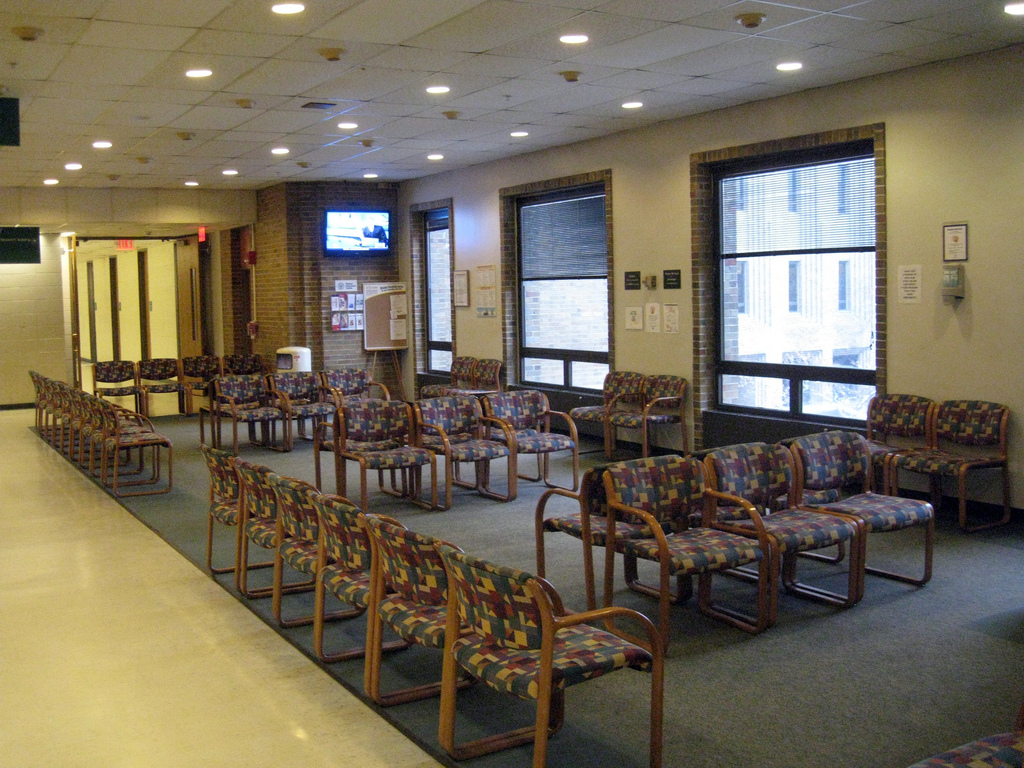

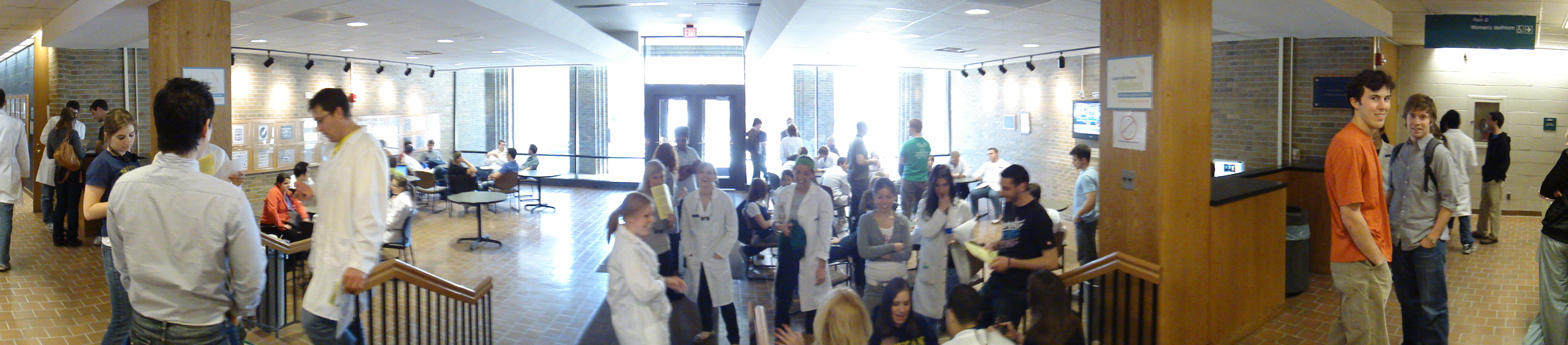
Students in the West Forum
