= All Smiles Dental Centers =

American dental clinic chain

All Smiles Dental Centers (ADSC) was an American chain of dental clinics, with its headquarters in Farmers Branch, Texas in the Dallas-Fort Worth area, The chain operates dental clinics in the Dallas-Fort Worth area and in Greater Houston. The company was the management service organization providing business support services to All Smiles Dental Professionals, P.C. The patients mostly consisted of children in low-income Hispanic communities.

As of May 2012, Valor Equity Partners owned 72% of the company, while founder Dr. Richard Malouf owned 28%. As of July 2012, the company was one of the largest providers of dental services in the Dallas-Fort Worth area and has about 60,000 Medicaid patients. As of September 2012, the company has about 20 clinics in the State of Texas. In August 2013, South Texas Dental bought the company.

== History ==
Dr. Richard Malouf, a Lebanese American, established the chain. It was founded in 2002.

On March 22, 2008 an All Smiles dental clinic opened in a remodeled Carnival Food Stores store in eastern Plano, Texas in the DFW area. It was the first of several planned in-store dental clinics.

== Controversy ==
A U.S. Supreme Court decision stated that the State of Texas did not provide adequate dental care to socioeconomically disadvantaged children. As a result, five years prior to 2012, the state government added $1.4 million to the funds for providing dental services to poor children. This caused an increase in dental companies providing braces. Accordingly, the All Smiles company established its braces program. On one occasion the amount of money All Smiles billed Medicaid for braces equaled the amount that the State of Illinois spent on braces in Medicaid. For one two-year period, All Smiles billed Medicaid for at least $15 million, overall twice the amount the entire State of Illinois billed Medicaid. Three years prior to 2011, the company collected $5.4 million in Medicaid orthodontics expenses. The annual orthodontics bill increased almost twice to $10.2 million, collected in the year 2010. In 2011 All Smiles was one of the largest billers for braces in the State of Texas, and it had put braces on 1,000 children under the age of 12. The Medicaid program is only supposed to cover orthodontics if it corrects severe conditions such as cleft lip and palate or complications from another condition, such as Down syndrome or muscular dystrophy.

Malouf and his wife Leanne were originally the sole owners of the chain. In 2010, Malouf sold much of the company to Valor Equity Partners. The All Smiles company stated that Chris Roussos, a non-dentist, became the head of the company.

In the fall of 2012, as part of an investigation examining Medicaid fraud in Texas, the state Medicaid program began auditing All Smiles. The Federal Government charged Malouf with fraudulent Medicaid billing for four years ending in the year 2007; the charges did not include his large Medicaid brace expenditures. In March 2012 the company signed a corporate integrity agreement pledging to improve billing practices and employee training with regulators from the federal and Texas state governments. During that month the company re-paid $1.2 million to Medicaid and did not admit to wrongdoing. In an April 2012 hearing, Dr. Christine Ellis, an orthodontist in the North Texas region who served as one of the auditors, audited All Smiles claims from 2007 to 2011 and concluded that it had engaged in "overutilization" of benefits before and after the 2010 change in ownership. Ellis said that she complained about All Smiles to the Texas State Board of Dental Examiners but the board said that it was unable to handle the case. She said that she had discussed the matter with the Texas Attorney General's Office and the Texas Office of Inspector General (OIF) for Medicaid, but that the U.S. Department of Justice had not contacted her.

On May 2, 2012, All Smiles Dental Center, Inc. filed for Chapter 11 bankruptcy protection. In its filings it listed $1–10 million in assets and $50–100 million in liabilities. Sydney P. Freeberg of Bloomberg said that the executive affidavit said that "Its hand was forced in part by a Texas Medicaid action cutting off payment to some of its clinics because of allegedly “excessive” and “inappropriate” orthodontic care." In June 2012 the Texas Attorney General filed a lawsuit against All Smiles. The two lawsuits from the Attorney General argue that Malouf and his company committed additional fraud, patient recruiting, and overbilling and that the practices "cost the State of Texas many millions of dollars." The state of Texas Medicaid program had put All Smiles on a payment hold due to what Stephanie Goodman, a spokesperson of the Texas Health and Human Services Commission, said was "credible evidence of fraud." Michael Lozich, the chief compliance officer, said that state inspectors had taken exception to 63 of the 86 reviewed orthodontic cases and that the company will challenge the state's claims.

In July 2012, Lozich said that the company is negotiating a final settlement with the state. By the end of July 2012, it closed its entire 13 office orthodontic operations, and it began refusing to see Medicaid patients for orthodontic treatment, dismissing 12,000 patients in the Dallas-Fort Worth area; it continued to see patients for general dentistry. The company laid off seven orthodontists. As the orthodontic operation was shut down, the company saw some patients who required emergency treatment.

As of July 2012, several lawyers, including Jim Moriarty, are suing Malouf under the False Claims Act.

In August 2013 South Texas Dental bought the company and all All Smiles locations were rebranded as South Texas Dental locations.

== See also ==
- Aspen Dental
- Kool Smiles
- ReachOut Healthcare America
- Small Smiles Dental Centers
- Smile Starters
- Sun Orthodontix
