= James R. Moriarty =

American lawyer

James Robert Moriarty
- Born: September 10, 1946 (age 79); Schenectady, New York
- Other name: Jim Moriarty
- Education: University of Houston
- Occupation: Lawyer
- Website: www.moriarty.com

James R. Moriarty (born September 10, 1946) is an American lawyer noted for mass torts against major corporations, including Tenet Healthcare Corporation, Shell Chemicals, DuPont, and Prudential Securities. His legal cases have been described in the books Serpent on the Rock by Kurt Eichenwald, Money-Driven Medicine: The Real Reason Health Care Costs So Much by Maggie Mahar, and Coronary by Stephen Klaidman. Moriarty is a former Marine and Gold Star father.

== Early life ==
Moriarty was born on September 10, 1946, in Schenectady, New York, shortly after his twin brother Robert James Moriarty, who was born the previous day. He dropped out of high school in January 1965 to enlist in the United States Marine Corps.

== Military experience ==
=== Vietnam combat Marine ===
Moriarty completed Marine Corps Recruit Depot (MCRD) San Diego with Platoon 212 in May 1965, received meritorious promotion to private first class. He then attended multiple "A" schools at Naval Air Technical Training Command Memphis, receiving meritorious promotion to lance corporal.

He was offered his choice of assignment and served three tours in the Vietnam War. He was awarded two single-mission Air Medals for heroic achievement while serving as a door gunner in a Marine Observation Squadron 2 helicopter gunship squadron located at Marble Mountain in South Vietnam. He was released from active duty as a sergeant in January 1969.

=== Advocate for veterans ===
==== Operation Tailwind ====
On June 7, 1998, CNN broadcast a story titled "Valley of Death" that purported to offer new, alarming information about a Vietnam War mission called Operation Tailwind. According to the story, U.S. Special Forces advanced into Laos to kill American defectors, dropping sarin nerve gas and killing women and children. A print version of the story appeared in Time magazine, CNN's news partner in the program, called NewsStand.

The story was proven to be false, and on July 2, 1998, the network retracted it in full, issuing a 54-page retraction.

An investigation into how the report was allowed to be broadcast concluded that reporters relied too much on information that supported their thesis, failing to properly weigh contrary information.

The CNN broadcast was not fair. Information that was inconsistent with the underlying conclusions reached by CNN was ignored or minimized. ... Statements of sources that were vague, ambiguous or qualified were relied upon as if they were clear, focused and unambiguous.

Moriarty represented three of the veterans who had been defamed, underwriting a documentary to tell the story of Tailwind from their point of view and shine a light on the irresponsible actions of the CNN journalists.

One veteran recounted turning on the TV with interest after CNN promoted a new program called NewsStand, then realizing the story was about him and his fellow soldiers.

"The more I watched it, the worse it got. There was nothing in that entire broadcast that was true," Army veteran Keith Plancich said.

As the veterans explain, they were sent into Laos to cause a diversion and draw the North Vietnamese away from a group of CIA mercenaries.

The team "escaped with the largest cache of enemy intelligence documents ever recovered in the war, and only three of their 156 soldiers killed," according to a summary of the documentary.

==== Medal of Honor recipient Gary M. Rose ====
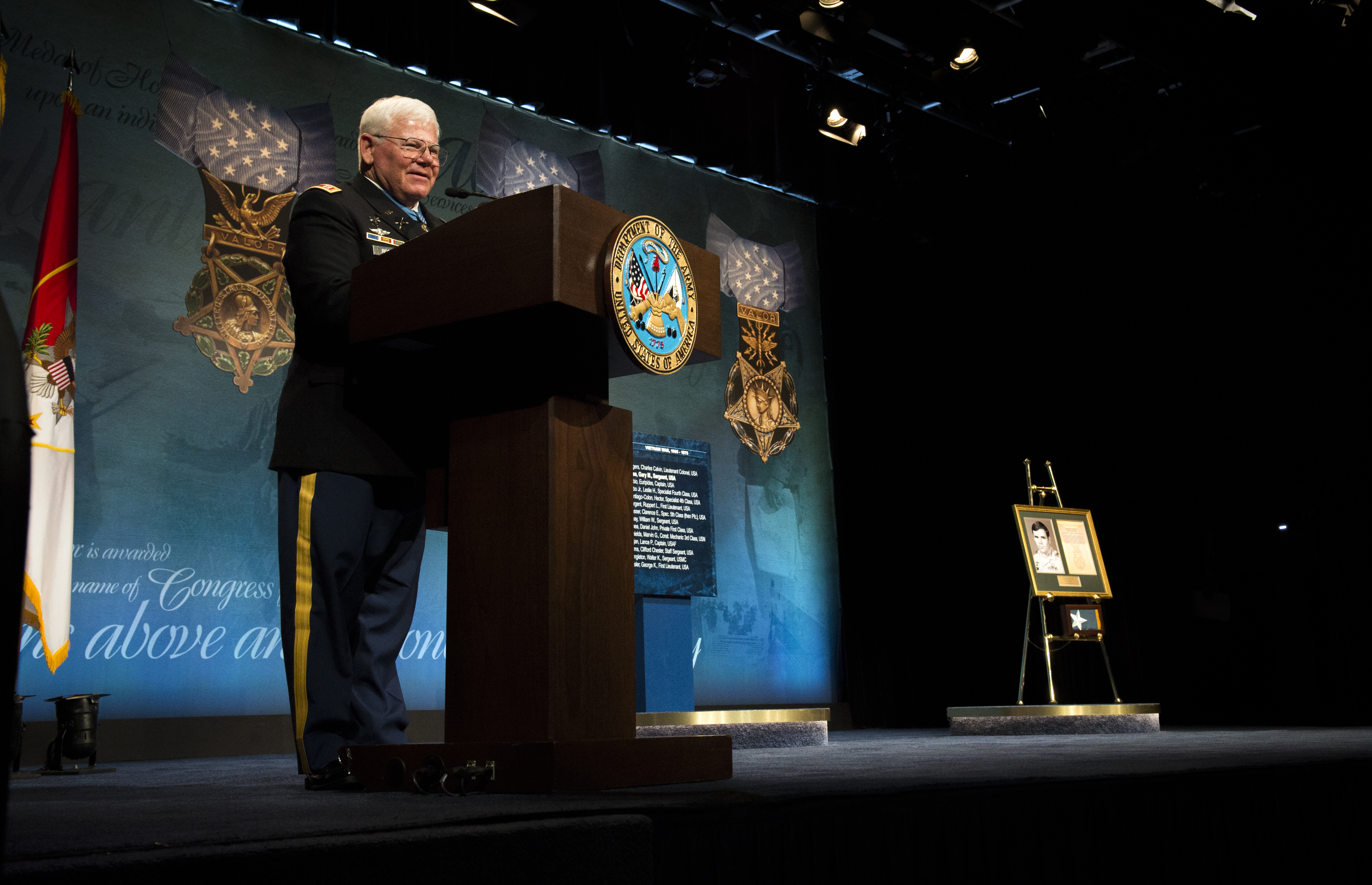
Retired Army Capt. Gary M. Rose, speaking at the Pentagon, received the Medal of Honor in 2017 for his heroic actions during Operation Tailwind.

Moriarty advocated for retired Army Capt. Gary M. Rose to receive the Medal of Honor decades after his name had originally been submitted. Capt. Rose was awarded the Distinguished Service Cross in 1971 for saving lives over four days despite being wounded himself during a Vietnam War mission called Operation Tailwind.

As recounted in the New York Times:

By the fourth day, when helicopters came to extract the team, enemy troops were so close that American planes dropped tear gas on their own men to drive the enemy back. Sergeant Rose was one of the last on the last helicopter, firing as he hobbled aboard.

When they lifted clear of the trees, he slumped to the floor of the helicopter, his marathon mission complete. Then a bullet pierced the neck of a door gunner, and the medic was up again. Out of bandages, he stopped the bleeding with a spare piece of cloth. As he worked, enemy fire hit the engines. The crippled aircraft crashed on a riverbank, spitting out men as it rolled.

Sergeant Rose, bleeding from his head, crawled into the wreckage.

Moriarty for years advocated for Capt. Rose's Medal of Honor packet to be reconsidered. Special legislation was required due to the amount of time that had passed since Rose's service. Rose received the nation's highest combat award in 2017.

==== U.S. Army Col. Paris D. Davis ====
Moriarty and other volunteers joined U.S. Army Col. Paris D. Davis as he was awarded the Medal of Honor by President Joe Biden at the White House on March 3, 2023. The recognition capped a years-long campaign by the volunteer team in support of Davis's nomination, which had languished since 1969.

"This year, we celebrate the 75th anniversary of our first fully integrated armed forces," President Biden told ceremony guests. "And the name 'Paris Davis' will still stand alongside the nation's pioneering heroes."

Col. Davis was one of the first African-Americans to serve as an officer in the Special Forces. Davis retired from the Special Forces in 1985.

"Everybody I've talked to that served under him says that he's the best officer they've ever served under," Neil Thorne, a volunteer advocate on the team with Moriarty, told CBS News in April 2021.

Then-Capt. Davis distinguished himself 17–18 June 1965 in action against the Viet Cong around Bong Son, Binh Dinh Province, Republic of Vietnam. Davis was left "the last American standing with a ragtag company of 90 South Vietnamese volunteers," according to a New York Times report on the renewed interest in Davis' nomination:

Certain that he was as good as dead, [Davis] began fighting without fear of consequence, pulling his M-16 trigger with his pinkie, sprinting repeatedly into open ground to rescue teammates, and refusing to leave the fight, ever after being shot several times.

Davis' team "clobbered the Viet Cong," according to Maj. Billy Cole, who submitted the original nomination packet in July 1965. Inexplicably, the packet was lost by the Army. "You just don't see a Medal of Honor packet get lost … it's a big deal. It got trashed," Thorne told Task and Purpose in February 2023.

An official Army inquiry in 1969 deemed that the nomination had indeed been lost or destroyed and that a new one was needed. However, Thorne found no evidence that a new one was submitted.

=== Purple Hearts for soldiers at Al Asad ===
Moriarty and partners pressed the government to award soldiers injured in a 2020 ballistic missile attack on an Iraqi air base with Purple Hearts. The U.S. government initially failed to recognize all the soldiers with traumatic brain injuries, applying instead a standard that one had to be medically evacuated to qualify, soldiers who survived the attack told CBS News.

The attack by Iran on the Al Asad Airbase was in retaliation for a U.S. strike that killed the head of the Islamic Revolutionary Guard Corps-Quds Force, which the U.S. government designates a terrorist organization. Following the attack, the U.S. government took a posture of downplaying the significance of the attack as well as the soldiers' injuries. The soldiers suffered headaches, vision and hearing problems, sleep loss, cognitive problems, balance issues and post-traumatic stress disorder. Many of them were deemed unfit for duty because of their injuries.

A CBS News investigation more than a year after the attack found "dozens of soldiers injured in the attack who have not been recognized with the Purple Heart and who have been denied the medical benefits that come with it, despite appearing to qualify."

The media and advocacy push led to an additional 50 soldiers from the D/82nd Aviation Regiment being recognized with Purple Hearts, which are not only an acknowledgement of the men and women's sacrifice but also help on a practical level, to facilitate necessary medical care for their service-connected injuries and access higher priority for other benefits like home loans and college tuition assistance.

=== Volunteer service ===
Moriarty served on the board of directors of the United States Marine Corps Combat Helicopter Association from 1998 to 2008 and published that organization's quarterly magazine, Popasmoke. (This is a reference to the phrase "pop a smoke," used by Marines who served in the Vietnam War. Helicopter crews asked ground crews to pop a smoke grenade so they could locate them and find a landing zone.)

Moriarty received the association's Arnold W. Barden Award for advancing the reputation of the association for his air show work as well as his contribution as publisher of Popasmoke.

He served on the board of directors of the Marine Corps Heritage Foundation, the group that founded the National Museum of the Marine Corps in Virginia.

He was the president of the Skyhawk Association from 1998 to 2000.

== Education ==
He earned Bachelor of Business Administration and Juris Doctor degrees from the University of Houston. He was admitted to the State Bar of Texas in 1976 and the Colorado Bar Association in 2006.

== Career ==
Moriarty founded Moriarty & Associates in 1986.

Moriarty and partners have obtained billions of dollars in awards for clients over a career spanning four decades. Moriarty is an expert in mass torts, a type of case in which many similar cases are grouped together but each case is weighed on its own merits. (This is not to be confused with class actions, which also involve many claimants but typically result in smaller awards for the plaintiffs.)

Moriarty's work has targeted makers of faulty medical devices, peddlers of shoddy investments, and medical providers that exploit Medicaid patients.

Moriarty served as special assistant to the former mayor of Houston, Bill White, throughout White's term in office. Among other duties, Moriarty assisted the city's attorneys on a pro bono basis, on one occasion helping the city enforce billboard laws designed to avoid "visual blight" in the city of Houston. White and Moriarty met while raising money for Bill Clinton's 1992 presidential campaign.

== Son's death ==
Moriarty's son, U.S. Army Staff Sgt. James F. Moriarty, was killed on November 4, 2016, while on a CIA training mission in Jordan for the 5th Special Forces Group at Fort Campbell, Ky. Moriarty and three other Green Berets were entering the King Faisal Air Base when they came under fire from a Jordanian soldier at the gate to the base. Killed in the ambush were Moriarty, 27; Sgt. 1st Class Matthew C. Lewellen, 27, of Kirksville, Mo., and Staff Sgt. Kevin J. McEnroe, 30, of Tucson, Ariz.

Initially, the Jordanian government blamed the Green Berets for the incident, saying that an American soldier driving one of the vehicles ignored demands to stop, prompting "an exchange of gunfire." The Jordanian government called the shooting a "chain of unfortunate events." Further details on the incident were scant.

Moriarty publicly criticized that explanation and said government officials had failed to tell the truth to the grieving families and the U.S. government. Moriarty told CBS News: "The Jordanian government lied to our government… They know what happened, they know who this guy is. … They owe us an explanation. Who was it that murdered my son and why?"

By late November, an investigation and surveillance video showed that the Americans "were shot without provocation" and had not violated security procedures at the gate, as Jordanian officials had suggested.

One official familiar with the surveillance video said it shows the convoy's lead vehicle being cleared through the gate. But as the second vehicle approaches the barrier, bullets are seen to rip through the windshield, hitting the two occupants inside. Two U.S. soldiers then leap from other vehicles in the convoy to take cover behind a concrete blast wall. But the Jordanian guard, wearing body armor and carrying his assault rifle, is seen in the video to charge toward the Americans, firing several bursts into one of them. The fourth U.S. soldier then fires back at the guard with his pistol, hitting him several times, the official said.

Investigators said they were unsure what had prompted the guard to attack the Americans, having found no links to jihad or terrorist groups. Over several months, Moriarty's family pressed through the media and through political avenues for the Jordanian guard to be held to account. James R. Moriarty and the families of the other slain Green Berets held briefings with national media and members of Congress aimed at putting pressure on Jordan. Moriarty's sister launched a blog to demand more information and honor her brother's memory. "We will not accept the lies that are coming out to protect diplomatic relations," she wrote in the inaugural post, dated three days after her brother's death.

By April 2017, the Jordanian government reversed its position, admitting that the shooter, Ma'arik al-Tawayha (last name variants Abu Tayeh, al-Tawaiha), did not follow protocol. Jordan agreed to put al-Tawayha on trial in a military court.

Prosecutors accused al-Tawayha "of voluntary manslaughter, violating military orders, and insulting the dignity and reputation of the armed forces."

On July 17, 2017, al-Tawayha was convicted and sentenced to life in prison.

The soldier who survived the attack went public with his story after the trial, describing the ambush to the New York Times in a piece published July 25, 2017, that stands as the most detailed account of the incident.

"We kept yelling in English and Arabic, saying we were friends. And he kept shooting," the soldier told the New York Times. "Eventually, we realized it wasn't an accident."

The families of the slain Green Berets in November 2018 sued the Hashemite Kingdom of Jordan for spreading lies about their sons, suggesting that the Americans failed to follow protocol at the gate or had been drinking alcohol, thereby prompting the shooting. U.S. investigations and video of the shooting disproved these claims.

In announcing the legal action, the families voiced a need to understand any motive for the killings.

"There's no amount of money that can take the place of my son, Jimmy," Moriarty said at a press conference announcing the families' lawsuit. "But, we want to know if there is anything else out there, any clues as to why that Jordanian soldier targeted our sons that day."

Staff Sgt. Moriarty's family in January 2021 accepted a posthumous Silver Star Medal for his valor in combat. The Silver Star, authorized by the President, was presented to Moriarty's family by U.S. Army Maj. Gen. Miguel A. Correa at a ceremony in Houston.

Moriarty, McEnroe, and Lewellen are also memorialized on the Central Intelligence Agency's Memorial Wall in Langley, Va., according to a Wikipedia entry about the Wall.

== Legal cases ==
=== Polybutylene (faulty plumbing) ===
Moriarty was instrumental in one of the largest mass action consumer fraud cases in history, with a recovery of approximately $1.1 billion from Shell Chemicals, Hoechst Celanese and DuPont. A 1997 press release from Trial Lawyers for Public Justice described the historic significance of the settlement:

The unprecedented settlement agreement, which became final in late 1996, provides a minimum of $950 million in relief and a potentially unlimited maximum to property owners. It [was] the largest property damage class action settlement in U.S. history [at that time].

In mid-1987, Moriarty filed the first polybutylene lawsuit against General Homes Corporation, U.S. Brass, Shell, Hoechst Celanese and DuPont on behalf of approximately 100 homeowners in a subdivision in La Porte, Texas, alleging that the plumbing system in the subdivision had failed, causing property damage and mental anguish. The homeowners sought damages for negligence, fraud, and violations of the Texas Deceptive Trade Practices Act (DTPA).

The complaint was that polybutylene pipes and fittings deteriorate over time due to the presence of chlorine compounds in water, resulting in leaks that can lead to property damage and creating the potential for contamination from pesticides and other toxic materials. According to Moriarty:

Polybutylene was a new modern miracle. Longer life, simple, reliable, at least according to all the sales talk. But its only claim to fame was that it leaked 100 percent of the time you put tap water in it.

Between 1987 and 1994, Moriarty and his partners litigated approximately 800 individual polybutylene cases, negotiating deals with Shell, Hoechst Celanese, DuPont and a variety of builders. Among the plaintiffs was a Houston-area couple whose leaky plumbing prompted them to replace carpets with cement and shut off their water before leaving home. "We feel like we were sold a bill of goods that wasn't any good," the plaintiff told the local newspaper.

In 1993, Moriarty was approached by Michael Caddell, an attorney who had filed a class action suit against Shell (Beeman v Shell Oil), and asked to join the suit. Two years later, attorneys in Cox v. Shell Oil joined with Moriarty and Caddell, and both cases were settled. The team settled with Shell and Hoechst Celanese for a minimum of $950 million, with DuPont settling separately for a minimum of $120 million.

Plaintiffs in the case received free re-plumb of their homes, replacing the polybutylene pipes with safer ones made from copper, CPVC or plastic, and were compensated from the settlement, which ultimately totaled approximately $1.1 billion.

The case was unique in that Moriarty and his fellow attorneys focused more on bringing relief to clients, rather than focusing on their part of the settlement. According to Moriarty:

One of the horror stories is that lawyers spend all their time battling to get their money, but they don't battle to get money in the client's hands. Class actions are set up as settlement class actions and not set up for litigation purposes. If you can't litigate a case, you're not going to be able to get the first class settlement.

=== Prudential Bache investment fraud ===
Moriarty was involved in the largest mass action filed against Prudential Securities along with Daryl Bristow and Stephen Hackerman, among others. The investigation found that PSI had defrauded investors of close to $8 billion, the largest fraud found by the U.S. Securities and Exchange Commission (SEC) in United States history to that point.

Kurt Eichenwald discussed the case at length in his book on the limited partnership scandal at Prudential, Serpent on the Rock.

Bristow brought in Moriarty because of his previous experience managing large numbers of clients in other mass action lawsuits. Hackerman later worked with Moriarty on the NME case in 1994. Moriarty created a computer program that allowed the lawyers to write individualized letters to the 5,800 clients they were managing. He is also credited for suggesting each plaintiff file an individual complaint to state regulators, the SEC, and the National Association of Securities Dealers – a scheme that Eichenwald suggests alerted the SEC to the magnitude of the Prudential fraud.

Prudential attempted to get the case settled for five cents on every dollar the plaintiffs had invested, a proposal Moriarty derided as ridiculous. The settlements for Bristow, Hackerman, and Moriarty's clients ultimately recouped the plaintiffs' lost investments entirely:

Clients in the first growth fund would receive fifty cents on the dollar on their investments. Combined with previous distributions, expected future distributions, and the remaining value of the partnerships, a client who invested $1,000 in the first growth fund would have $1,058. For the second growth fund, the $1,000 investor would have $1,138.

After their case was concluded, Moriarty remained involved with the National Association of Securities Dealers working with the SEC to investigate PSI's suspected fraud. When Nancy Smith, a New Mexico securities regulator, asked him for advice on creating a questionnaire for the investors in PSI, he recommended her to a polling expert from Rice University. When Smith informed him that she could not afford the estimated cost of $5,000-$10,000 for utilizing those resources, Moriarty paid for it himself from his fees from the PSI case.

=== National Medical Enterprises/Tenet Healthcare ===
==== Texas psychiatric hospitals ====
Moriarty, in conjunction with several other firms, filed a mass tort against National Medical Enterprises in late 1994 on behalf of approximately 600 patients who charged that they had been abused in Texas psychiatric hospitals owned by the company in order to defraud insurance companies and the U.S. Federal Government. The case was discussed in depth in Stephen Klaidman's book Coronary.

The lawsuit was settled on July 30, 1997. The New York Times reported a $100 million settlement for all plaintiffs involved in two lawsuits filed in Conroe, TX and Fort Worth, TX. Moriarty was unable to disclose the exact settlement their clients received, but The Times reported that 620 cases were filed in Conroe and settled for $85 million, and approximately 60 cases were settled in Fort Worth for $13 million; also that Moriarty represented "over 600" of the plaintiffs.

National Medical Enterprises changed its name to Tenet Healthcare Corporation in March 1995.

==== Unnecessary heart surgeries ====
Again in conjunction with other firms, in 2003 Moriarty filed new lawsuits against the new Tenet Healthcare Corporation's Redding Medical Center on behalf of approximately 450 patients who claimed they had received unnecessary heart surgeries so that the company could bill insurance companies for the procedures. The company settled with 750 plaintiffs for the sum of $395 million in December 2004.

In addition to its individual settlements with the plaintiffs, Tenet paid $54 million in fines for its conduct at Redding Medical Center. Tenet also paid $900 million in fines and settlements to the U.S. Federal Government for manipulating the Medicare system in connection with its hospital operations. The settlement remains one of the largest settlements under the False Claims Act. (The largest such settlement was with GlaxoSmithKline, which paid $2 billion in civil penalties in a case stemming from illegal marketing of prescription drugs.)

Moriarty's personal opinions on the major players of NME/Tenet Healthcare are quoted in Money-Driven Medicine:

These are some of the most intelligent people I've ever met in my life. They're tremendously capable. They have insight, vision, and they're smart, smart, smart. But they have the moral and ethical sense of sea slugs. Zero compassion. To them, patients are billing opportunities.

=== Beijing and Vancouver Olympics ticket controversy ===
Moriarty drew attention to the problem of illegal ticket sales in the 2008 Beijing Olympics after purchasing a reported $12,000 worth of tickets that were never delivered.

About 2,500 people around the world were similarly scammed, according to British government investigators.

The victims included families of Olympic athletes.

Moriarty assisted ticketholders in obtaining fraud protection from their credit card companies, offering this work as a pro-bono service. Through an advocacy and PR campaign, he exposed the perpetrators of the ticketing fraud and drew international attention to the problem of scant ticket access for Olympic families.

In 2010, Moriarty spoke out against the International Olympic Committee (IOC), pointing to two "serious problems." First, that the organization had "not curbed ticket reselling abuses that enrich profiteers connected to the IOC and National Olympic Committees (NOCs)." Second, they were "inconsistently policing the use of Olympic trademarks" that often were used on fraudulent ticket sites."

He also said that the IOC and United States Olympic Committee (USOC) did not make adequate efforts to shut down ticket sellers illegally operating under the IOC's trade names, which made it difficult for consumers to determine the difference between legitimate and illegitimate sellers.

Moriarty defended ticket reseller Gene Hammett against Joseph Bunevacz and his son David Bunevacz, whom Hammett claimed sold him 17,000 tickets to the Vancouver games that never materialized. Hammett alleged that the Bunevaczes led him to believe that the tickets were coming from several National Olympics Committees and their official ticket agents in Europe.

The perpetrators of the Beijing ticketing fraud, Terence Shepherd, Alan Scott, and Allan Schaverien, were sentenced to imprisonment in July 2011. Shepherd, the ringleader of the group operating as Xclusive Leisure and Hospitality Ltd, was "convicted of money laundering, two counts of fraudulent trading and two counts of acting as a company director whilst disqualified," according to a summary of the case by the UK's Serious Fraud Office. Shepherd was ordered to pay £1.25 million in penalties and victims' compensation, dubbed a "confiscation order" in the British court system. Scott was ordered to pay £500,000.

In January 2018, Shepherd's wife, Margaret Canty-Shepherd, was ordered by a court to sell the couple's £3 million home (about $4 million) to pay the confiscation order.

Ticketing access for Olympic families improved. For the 2010 Vancouver Games, the U.S. Olympic Committee pledged to provide athletes with two complimentary tickets for their events, and the Canadian Olympic Committee allocated to each sports federation a block of tickets for athletes to purchase.

A similar policy was in place for the 2018 Winter Games held in Pyeongchang. The U.S. Olympic Committee provided athletes with two complimentary tickets for each event in which they competed, and each athlete was guaranteed the chance to purchase two tickets for their events under a program run by the PyeongChang Organizing Committee.

=== Abusive dentists ===
==== ImmediaDent ====
Moriarty represented a dentist whistleblower in a qui tam lawsuit against the corporate chain ImmediaDent, which operates nine dental care practices in Indiana, and a related company called Samson Dental Partners.

The whistleblower suit alleged that ImmediaDent submitted fraudulent bills to the government for treating military families and families insured by Medicaid. The chain billed for deep cleanings and surgical extractions that were not medically necessary, and directed dental assistants to administer sedation and apply sealants ― services that for safety reasons only licensed dentists may perform.

According to the lawsuit:

Defendants' business model required dentists to 'overtreat' to generate the revenue required to support the individual clinics' payments to the defendants. Moreover, the incentive structure for salary and bonuses for dentists was based on production.

The lawsuit alleged that ImmediaDent engaged in the illegal corporate practice of dentistry.

Samson Dental Partners, LLC and ImmediaDent of Indiana, LLC agreed to pay $5.1 million to the federal government, the State of Indiana, and the whistleblower dentist, in a settlement announced by the Department of Justice in November 2018.

The dentist whistleblower will receive $925,000 plus expenses, attorneys' fees and costs.

The case was filed in 2013.

==== Small Smiles Dental Centers ====
Moriarty and his partners represent approximately 550 clients in a case against Small Smiles Dental Centers, a chain of Private Equity owned dental clinics based in Nashville, Tennessee. The chain currently operates 70 centers in 22 states, as well as centers in Washington, D.C.

The case alleges that these clinics target children from low-income families who rely on Medicaid for their dental care, and that Small Smiles clinics are performing "assembly line" dentistry, resulting in multiple rushed and unnecessary dental procedures performed on children in order to profit by billing Medicaid. According to a May 2012 article from Bloomberg:

Church Street may be abusing patients, "grossly overcharging the United States government in Medicaid reimbursement claims," and focusing "more on achieving self- imposed quotas via assembly line service than proper patient care," U.S. Senators Charles Grassley and Max Baucus told the company in a November letter copied to Carlyle co-founder William E. Conway Jr. Grassley, an Iowa Republican, is Ranking Member of the Senate Judiciary Committee. Baucus, a Montana Democrat, chairs the Finance Committee.

One broad issue in the inquiry is whether the management companies merely provide services to dentists, or are breaking the law by directing care, according to people familiar with the matter and letters the Senators sent to state regulators. State laws broadly say only licensed dentists or firms they own can practice dentistry.

The question at the heart of the issue is the legality of Private Equity owned dental clinics. State governments, including Moriarty's home state of Texas, forbid professional practices such as dental offices from being owned by unlicensed professionals.

In January 2010, Small Smiles gained national attention when its parent company, FORBA, settled False Claims Act allegations with the United States Department of Justice. The DOJ claimed that Small Smiles was

… causing the submission of claims for reimbursement for a wide range of dental services provided to low-income children that were either medically unnecessary or performed in a manner that failed to meet professionally-recognized standards of care. These services included performing pulpotomies (baby root canals), placing crowns, administering anesthesia (including nitrous oxide), performing extractions, and providing fillings and/or sealants.

The 2010 settlement with the Department of Justice was for $24 million, plus interest, to be paid over five years. The DOJ's assertion was that the settlement was meant to

… resolve allegations that [Small Smiles] caused bills to be submitted to state Medicaid programs for medically unnecessary dental services performed on children insured by Medicaid.

In the report, Tony West, Assistant Attorney General for the Civil Division of the Department of Justice, stated, "We have zero tolerance for those who break the law to exploit needy children. Illegal conduct like this endangers a child's well-being, distorts the judgments of health care professionals, and puts corporate profits ahead of patient safety."

In January 2012, possibly as a result of the settlement with the DOJ, FORBA changed its name to Church Street Health Management, a reference to the street address of the company's corporate headquarters. In February of that year, Church Street Health Management filed for Chapter 11 bankruptcy.

In 2014, Church Street Health Management was barred from the Medicaid program following what federal officials said were breaches of a compliance agreement aimed at ensuring appropriate standards of care.

==== ReachOut Healthcare America ====
On June 1, 2012, Moriarty brought a suit on behalf of Isaac and Joel Gagnon against Big Smiles, a school dental program operated by ReachOut Healthcare America (RHA) in Arizona. RHA is owned and controlled by Morgan Stanley Private Equity company, with four Morgan Stanley members on the RHA board.

ReachOut Healthcare America and the Big Smiles program recently gained nationwide attention when the school dental service performed multiple pulpotomies and crowns on a four-year-old medically fragile child without the consent of his mother. Young Isaac Gagnon suffered shaken baby syndrome as an infant and still requires special consideration and care when receiving any sort of medical attention. For this reason, his adoptive mother, Stacey Gagnon, informed Big Smiles that they did not have permission to perform dental procedures on her son. She was surprised and alarmed, therefore, when Isaac arrived home from school having received numerous dental procedures. According to his mother, when she asked him what was wrong he could only reply, "Mommy, the dentist man got me."

Moriarty joins the case as part of his overall initiative against private equity-owned dental clinics.

==== Houston dentist Bethaniel S. Jefferson ====
Moriarty represented a 4-year-old who suffered brain damage stemming from a botched dental procedure on Jan. 7, 2016 by Houston, Texas-area dentist Bethaniel S. Jefferson, who practiced at Diamond Dental. "Both Jefferson and her staff ignored warning sounds and visual indications which showed that for a period of about five hours (the 4-year-old's) brain suffered from a severe lack of oxygen," according to the plaintiffs' complaint in the family's lawsuit filed July 27, 2016 against Jefferson in Harris County District Court. The civil case was settled on May 18, 2017, with a Special Needs Trust established to benefit the 4-year-old, court records show.

Jefferson's Texas dental license was revoked Nov. 18, 2016.

Jefferson was also charged criminally, a rarity for cases such as hers.

Jefferson was indicted on July 24, 2017, "accused of intentionally and knowingly by omission causing serious bodily injury to a child by failing to seek and provide adequate medical attention, a first degree felony, according to the Texas Penal Code," according to a local media report.

Ms. Jefferson chose to do everything other than provide the care the victim needed," Stan Clark, Assistant Attorney General, Medicaid Fraud Control Unit, and Special Prosecutor-Harris County D.A, stated. "As a result, the victim has suffered permanent brain damage and will never lead a normal life."

Jefferson was sentenced to 5 years' probation after being convicted in September 2023 of reckless injury to a child. The jury in her case sought a more severe punishment, of imprisonment, but the judge reduced the sentence. It is rare for this type of case to lead to such criminal charges.

"The child, now 11, can no longer see, speak, walk, or eat on her own and requires around-the-clock medical care after suffering drug-induced seizures and oxygen deprivation during the surgery," KTRK Channel 13 in Houston reported.

The case was spotlighted nationally by NBC News in an investigation into the dangers of dental sedation of young children. Moriarty told NBC that the problem of over-sedation stems from flawed payment incentives: "It's not getting better. It's getting worse. It's another procedure to sell the patient."

==== Children's Dental Group ====
Moriarty represents clients in a case against Children's Dental Group, a California dental chain whose Anaheim location was the source of a bacterial outbreak in 2016. Children who developed infections from the outbreak of Mycobacterium abscessus underwent surgeries and months of antibiotic treatment to counter the bacteria. M. abscessus is difficult to treat because it is resistant to standard drug treatment, a phenomenon known as "multi-drug resistance."

The Orange County, Calif., health agency tracked 73 confirmed or probable cases of infection.

==== Corporate and Private Equity-owned dental practices ====
Moriarty has worked to bring public attention to the issue of corporate ownership of dental practices, especially private-equity groups whose intent is to buy and sell dental practices for maximum profit. Such incentives drive overtreatment, and the poor are especially vulnerable to abuse, receiving treatment that is not medically necessary, Moriarty has said.

"Unlike (professional limited liability corporations), ownership of a dental practice by a for-profit corporation introduces a fundamental conflict of interest into the business model," Moriarty wrote in a 2011 paper.

With a few exceptions, states bar the corporate practice of dentistry. However, corporations have sought to get around this ban by hiring dentists to serve as owners in-name-only while the corporation retains the actual day-to-day control of the dental practice.

Moriarty testified at a 2012 Texas state House committee hearing about one such dental company that used an absentee dentist to front the organization. Moriarty said the company's staff restrained young patients with a device called a "papoose board" that binds the head, torso and limbs with Velcro straps. The Texas Tribune reported on the hearing:

They won't let the parents be present because the parents would be tempted in Texas to pistol-whip them if they knew what they were going to do," Moriarty said. He's currently suing one company that operates six dental clinics under various names in Texas and said the dentist who claims to operate those clinics — but actually works and treats patients in Oklahoma — bills Texas $12 million a year to treat Medicaid patients.

The ban on the corporate ownership of dental practices stems from a legal principle, the "corporate practice of medicine doctrine," aimed at keeping laypeople who have no medical training from interfering with the professional judgments of doctors and dentists, such as what treatments and drugs to recommend and how to hire qualified, caring medical staff. This principle was developed and supported by the American Medical Association.

As of 2016 Moriarty had secured settlements worth more than $42 million on behalf of 3,000 children treated at "corporate clinics specializing in Medicaid patients," he told the Houston Chronicle.

=== Military housing ===
Moriarty has joined legal and advocacy efforts to fix the nation's crumbling military housing.

The issue came to public attention in 2018, when the Reuters news agency launched a series of investigations into the squalid conditions of publicly funded housing for service members and their families. The news agency found that mold, pests, lead, and structural hazards were pervasive in much of the housing stock, and that landlords—private companies on 50-year contracts with the government—had failed to properly repair and maintain the homes. An independent survey of military families conducted in the wake of the reporting found just 16 percent of respondents had a positive view of their housing, with more than half of respondents reporting a negative view.

Congress held hearings beginning in 2019 and approved spending $300 million in the 2020 defense authorization act aimed at deterring fraud by the landlords and protecting service members from retaliation for speaking out on housing problems. The legislative provisions passed by Congress (known as the tenant bill of rights) required landlords to open up maintenance work-order histories to residents and compelled the military to disclose incentive payments to the companies.

The housing issues spurred a wave of lawsuits around the country, including by Moriarty and partners:

1. A 2020 lawsuit against Lendlease on behalf of U.S. Army families who allege they were sickened by mold-infested housing at Fort Hood
2. A 2019 lawsuit against Hunt Military Communities on behalf of U.S. Air Force families who allege the company under-maintained their housing at Randolph and Laughlin Air Force bases in Texas

=== Khobar Towers bombing ===
Moriarty and partners obtained an $879 million judgment in 2020 for U.S. Air Force members (and their families) who were wounded in the 1996 terrorist bombing of Khobar Towers, a housing complex for American military personnel in Saudi Arabia. Nineteen U.S. service members were killed and hundreds were wounded in the attack carried out by Hezbollah.

The order for payment (which is distinct from actual collection of the award) is against the Islamic Republic of Iran, which was found to have directed and provided material support for the terrorist attack. The plaintiffs are eligible for partial payment from the United States Victims of State Sponsored Terrorism Fund, which was set up to compensate victims using money from fines and forfeitures paid by companies found to have laundered money in violation of sanctions laws.

== Personal life, associations ==
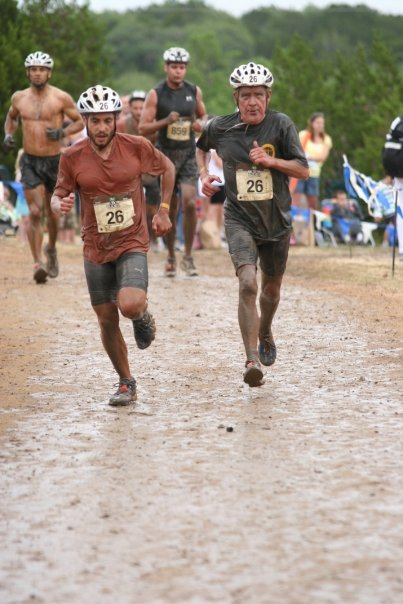
Moriarty, at right, competes in the 2009 Austin Muddy Buddy, a biathlon.

Moriarty served on the board of directors for Annunciation Orthodox School in Houston.

Moriarty lives in Houston, Texas. He is an avid athlete and frequently competes in races, including 5Ks, marathons, sprints, and half-Ironman triathlons. He completed his first marathon at age 60.

His son, Jimmy, died in 2016. Moriarty has four surviving children.

== References and further reading ==
- Eichenwald, Kurt. Serpent on the Rock (New York: HarperCollins, 1995)
- Klaidman, Stephen. Coronary (New York: Scribner, 2007)
- Mahar, Maggie. Money-Driven Medicine: The Real Reason Health Care Costs So Much (New York: HarperCollins, 2006)
