= Papoose (disambiguation) =

A papoose is a Native American child.

Papoose may also refer to:

- Papoose (rapper), an American rapper
- Cradle board, a type of child carrier
- Papoose board, a type of medical restraint
- Papoose (tanker), an American ship launched in 1921
- Marlin Model 70P, a portable semi-automatic .22 rifle, known as the Marlin "Papoose"
- Papoose on the Loose, a cartoon by Walter Lantz
- Piper PA-29 Papoose, a single engine light airplane produced by Piper Aircraft
- Walter "Papoose" Nelson, American R&B guitarist
