= Ameritox =

American urine drug monitoring company

- Type: Private
- Industry: Urine Drug Monitoring
- Founded: Midland, TX
- Headquarters: Baltimore, MD, United States
- Key people: A. Scott Walton (CEO); Todd Garner (COO); Jay Zimmerman (Senior Vice President and Chief Laboratory Officer); Tony Pino (Senior Vice President, Managed Care); Mike Ziegler (Senior Vice President, Sales)
- Products: Rx Guardian, Rx Guardian CD
- Website: http://www.ameritox.com (defunct)

Ameritox was a company that provided physicians with urine drug monitoring and reporting services. Headquartered in Baltimore, Maryland, the company also had a CLIA-certified laboratory in Greensboro, North Carolina.

Ameritox offered urine drug testing and reporting services to help physicians determine if their chronic pain patients are taking their pain medications correctly. Physicians use this information to identify potential medication misuse and abuse, and make more informed decisions. Ameritox's customer service and patient management support tools permitted physicians to integrate medication monitoring into their practice.

== History ==
Ameritox Ltd. was founded in 1996 in Midland, Texas as Universal Toxicology Laboratories (UTL), a federally certified drug testing facility and medical examiner toxicology laboratory.

UTL identified a growing need for a more detailed way of monitoring the use of long-term pain medications used by patients. The company became Ameritox Ltd. in 2003. Today, Ameritox claims to be the nation's largest provider of pain medication monitoring solutions for physicians.

In 2018 Ameritox sold is book of business, auctioned equipment and other assets, and ceased to operate.

== Products ==
=== Rx Guardian CD ===
Rx Guardian CD ^{SM} is now part of the Rx Guardian ^{SM} process. Rx Guardian CD ^{SM} features a unique reference database supported by a proprietary normalization algorithm. Patients’ normalized results are compared against the reference database, giving added confidence in assessing whether patients are taking their medications correctly.

=== Rx Guardian Insight Report ===
In 2012, Ameritox launched the Rx Guardian INSIGHT Report, which, according to a press release, "provides a concise summary of the most important elements of a patient's medication monitoring results. It also helps clinicians assess a patient's medication adherence over time by showing a chronology of previous Rx Guardian CD(SM) standard scores."

== Research ==
Ameritox's clinical research program investigates topics related to managing patients on chronic opioid therapy. Studies include:

=== Patterns of Drug Use in the Older Chronic Pain Population (2012) ===
This poster was presented at the American Pain Society's annual meeting and showed "a significant rate of potential non-adherence in the older population, supporting the need for routine urine drug monitoring in older adults in order to improve clinical decision making and enhance patient safety."

=== Healthcare costs and nonadherence among chronic opioid users (2011) ===
This study assessed the health economic burden of chronic opioid users and determined whether potential opioid regimen nonadherence is associated with increased healthcare costs. The study concludes that patients on chronic opioid therapy who were likely to be nonadherent to their prescription regimens, according to urine drug monitoring results, had significantly higher overall healthcare costs than patients who are likely adherent to their prescription regimen.

=== High Rates of Inappropriate Drug Use in the Chronic Pain Population (2009) ===
Ameritox and the Jefferson School of Population Health at Thomas Jefferson University conducted a national study to determine the rates of inappropriate use, and likely abuse, misuse and diversion of opioids among chronic pain patients, as measured by urine drug testing in the clinical setting. The results showed that 75% of patients in the study may not have been taking their pain medication consistent with their prescribed regimen.

== Civil Settlement ==
In 2010, the United States Attorney Robert E. O’Neill and Ameritox, Ltd. reached an agreement to pay $16.3 million in a civil settlement that addressed allegations that it paid kickbacks to providers in order to induce them to refer Medicare business.

Ameritox also entered into a 5-year corporate integrity agreement with the Department of Health & Human Services Office of Inspector General (HHS-OIG). Among other things, the CIA requires the company to engage an independent review organization to scrutinize its contractual relationships.
