= Pacific Dental Services =

American dental company

- Type: Privately Held Company
- Industry: Dental Service Organization
- Founded: 1994; 32 years ago
- Founder: Stephen Thorne IV, CEO
- Headquarters: Irvine, California, U.S.
- Area served: United States
- Services: Manages branded dental practices
- Number of employees: 12,000
- Website: www.pacificdentalservices.com

Pacific Dental Services (PDS) is a dental support organization (DSO) that provides business and administrative services for dental offices in the United States. It is headquartered in Irvine, California.

According to founder and CEO Stephen Thorne, Pacific Dental Services follows a business model that provides operational practices, procedures, and technology for dental practices. Its ownership structure allows dentists to own their practices while engaging PDS’s management services.

== History ==
The Orange County Business Journal listed PDS as one of the fastest-growing companies in Orange County in 2007. By 2012, the company supported over 300 dental offices across the West Coast. That number grew to 816 offices in 24 states by 2020.

PDS projected that its total revenue would grow to $2 billion by the end of 2020, but due to the COVID-19 pandemic, the company laid off 8,000 of its 13,000 employees, and revenue dipped to $1.6 billion by the end of the year.

In 2021, Moody's Investors Service assigned PDS a B1 CFR bond credit rating, supported by the company's sales growth and expansion while constrained by its history of negative cash flow due to growth investments.

== Technology ==
PDS was the first DSO to implement Epic Systems's electronic health record system with dental practices. The patient portal enables patients and providers to access and share information, make appointments, and manage billing.

Various PDS offices use cone beam computed tomography to diagnose conditions. By 2020, 100 PDS-supported offices were using the technology, and by 2022, that number had grown to 365.

== Partnerships ==
PDS is partnered with dental equipment manufacturer Envista to provide imaging and tooth replacement solutions from Nobel Biocare. In 2022, the companies announced a five-year extension to their partnership, upgrading the imaging infrastructure to 3D imaging and adding Spark clear aligners.

In 2021, PDS partnered with the American Diabetes Association to promote awareness of the "Mouth-Body Connection" and the link between periodontal disease and chronic illnesses such as diabetes.

== Smile Generation ==
Pacific Dental Services supports Smile Generation, a referral service that connects patients with PDS dentists in the United States and provides financing options.

== Charity ==
Smile Generation partners with the Pacific Dental Services Foundation, a non-profit 501(c)(3) organization, on various charity and community service events to help provide dental care to underserved populations. Charity events have included free service days with affiliate practices and fundraising campaigns with the Special Olympics, KaBOOM! and charity: water.

PDS has been listed as one of Orange County’s “Companies That Care” by the Orange County Business Journal.

== See also ==
- National Dental Association
