= Aspen Dental =

American dental company

Aspen Dental Management, Inc.
- Type: Subsidiary
- Industry: Corporate dentistry Dental support organization
- Founded: 1998; 28 years ago
- Founder: Robert Fontana (CEO)
- Headquarters: Chicago, Illinois, U.S.
- Area served: United States
- Services: Manages branded Dental practices
- Parent: The Aspen Group (TAG)
- Website: aspendental.com

Aspen Dental Management, Inc., commonly referred to as Aspen Dental, is an American dental support organization that supports Aspen Dental-branded dentistry locations. Its headquarters is in Chicago, Illinois.

The organization provides support services to around 1100 independently owned dental offices in the United States. Aspen Dental branded dentistry locations are targeted at individuals who may not currently have a relationship with a dental provider or otherwise face financial or other barriers to care.

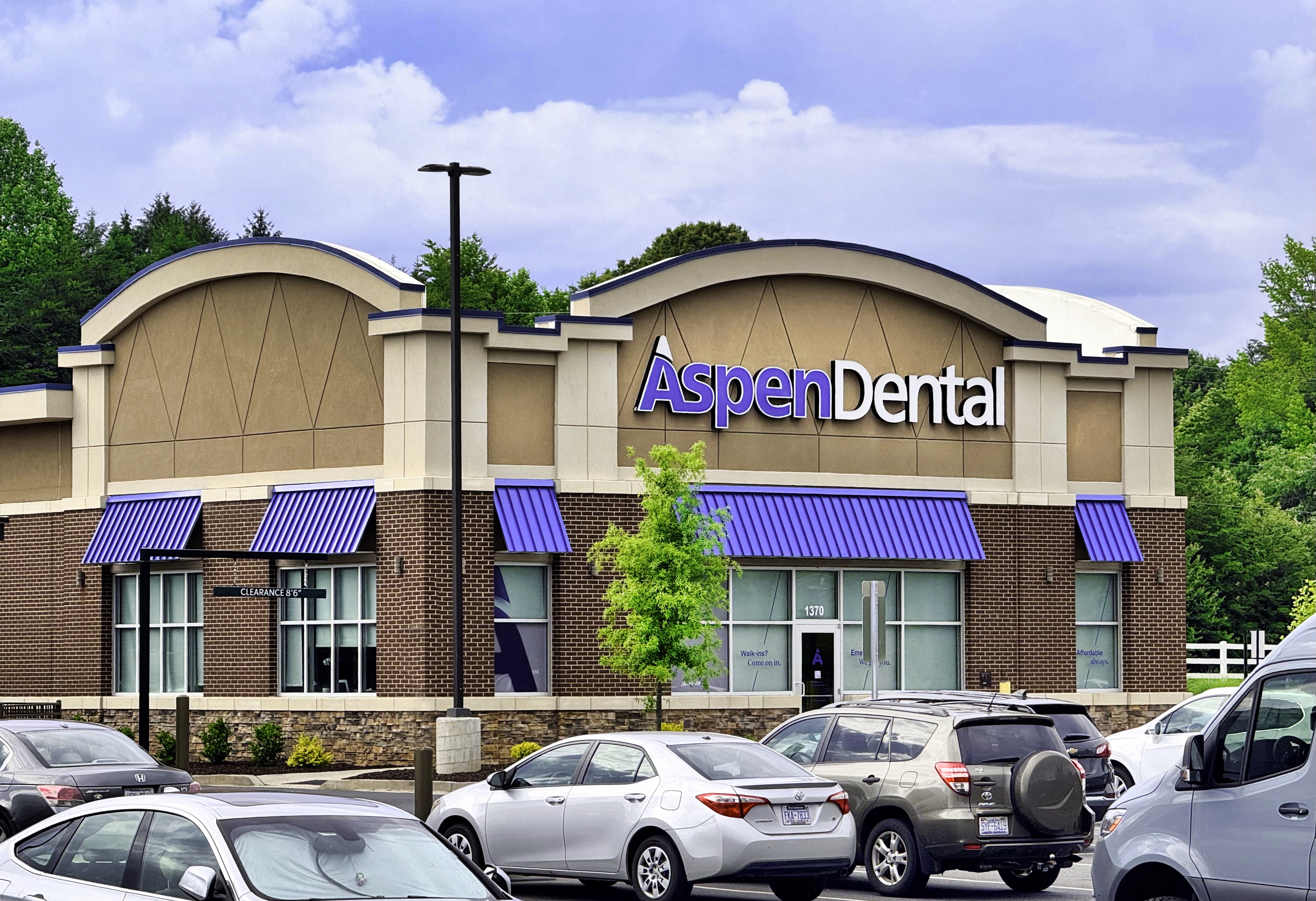
Aspen Dental in Franklin, North Carolina

== History ==
=== Early history ===
Aspen Dental was founded in 1998 in East Syracuse, NY as the result of a merger between East Coast Dental, founded by Robert Fontana, and Upstate Dental, which Fontana had previously left in 1997.

By 2000, Aspen Dental had expanded to 33 locations in New York, Connecticut, Rhode Island, and Massachusetts.

=== 2006 to present ===
In 2006, private equity firm Ares Management acquired Aspen Dental for an undisclosed amount. At the time of the acquisition, Aspen Dental operated 87 locations across seven states.

In 2010, Leonard Green & Partners purchased Aspen Dental from Ares Management for about $500 million. By August 2010, private equity firms were bidding on Aspen Dental and Kool Smiles, the two largest national chains of dental offices in the United States.

Between October 2010 and July 2015, Aspen settled with state consumer protection authorities in Pennsylvania, New York and Massachusetts and agreed to pay reimbursements to former patients and financial contributions to consumer protection probes in those states without admitting fault or wrongdoing.

In June 2012, a PBS series entitled Dollars and Dentists produced by Frontline in partnership with the Center for Public Integrity described Aspen Dental's business model as one where dental services are advertised at steep discounts, but where patients were subsequently overcharged or given unnecessary treatments.

In 2015, the United States District Court for the Northern District of New York dismissed a class-action lawsuit accusing the company of illegally owning dental practices and deceiving patients. The lawsuit accused Aspen of violating laws in 22 states which allow only dentists to own a dental practice.

In 2015, an affiliate of private equity firm American Securities led the recapitalization of Aspen Dental Management Inc. in partnership with Ares Management, Leonard Green & Partners and the existing management team.

In December 2020, lawsuits were filed against Aspen for negligence after an employee allegedly hid cameras in the office washroom at a practice in Illinois.

In October 2021, Aspen Dental moved its headquarters to an office in Chicago's Fulton Market District.

In May 2022, a lawsuit was filed against Aspen dental for the death of Sandra Heath who reportedly died while under anesthesia at Cedar Park Aspen Dental office. The lawsuit was settled out of court in January 2023.

== Operations ==
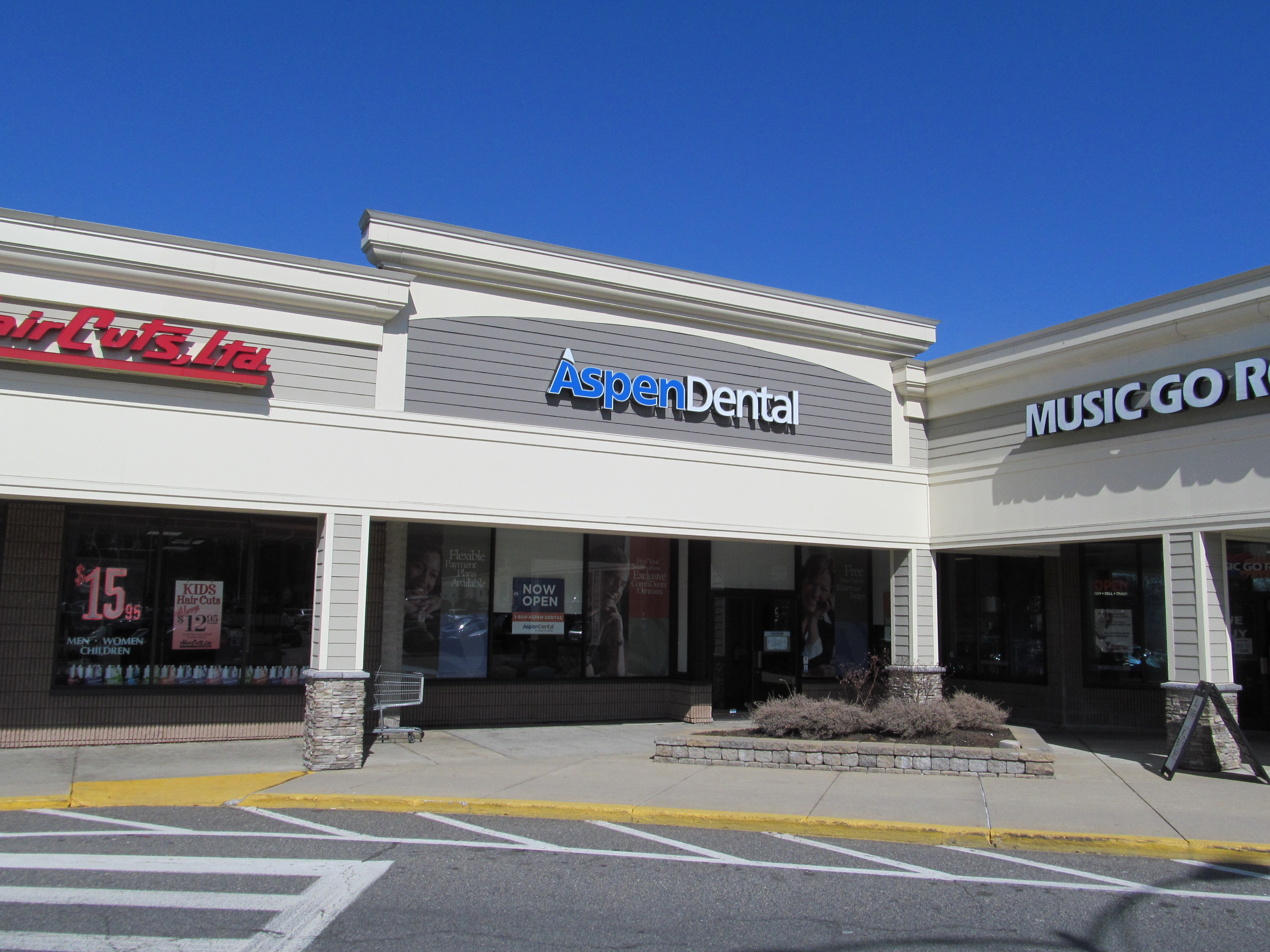
Aspen Dental in Natick, Massachusetts

Aspen Dental Management Inc. operates as a dental support organization and provides marketing, operations, and training support services to the Aspen Dental-branded practices. Aspen Dental practices are all independently owned by licensed dentists. The Aspen Group (TAG) is the parent company of Aspen Dental.

In 2014, Aspen Dental launched the Healthy Mouth Movement, offering veterans free dental care. As of 2019, the company had provided free dental services to more than 22,000 veterans and people in need through the volunteer effort. In 2022, the company opened a free dental clinic called the TAG Oral Care Center for Excellence in Chicago's West Loop. The clinic provides free dental services, including extractions and implants, to low income Illinois residents who don't have insurance or who are eligible for coverage through Medicaid. It is staffed by dentists from Aspen Dental clinics across the US, who receive professional development and clinical training while assisting with patients at the clinic.

Aspen Dental's services are aimed at individuals who may not have regular access to dental services. Many Aspen Dental practices are located in regions with a need for dental providers known as dental deserts.

== See also ==
- All Smiles Dental Centers
- Kool Smiles
- ReachOut Healthcare America
- Small Smiles Dental Centers
- Smile Starters
- Sun Orthodontix
- ZocDoc
