= John Corapi =

American priest (born 1947)

Personal life
- Born: May 20, 1947 (age 79) Hudson, New York, U.S.

Religious life
- Religion: Catholic
- Order: Society of Our Lady of the Most Holy Trinity (S.O.L.T.) (current membership status unknown)
- Ordination: May 26, 1991

John Anthony Corapi (born May 20, 1947), formerly known as Fr. John Corapi, is an inactive Catholic priest of the Society of Our Lady of the Most Holy Trinity (S.O.L.T.) in the United States. He was popular in the early 2000s for his regular appearances on Catholic television and his syndicated daily Catholic radio show. He published instructional media including books, DVDs, and websites, and made speaking appearances throughout the world.

In 2005, Corapi was awarded US$2.7 million for his role as a whistleblower in a qui tam False Claims Act lawsuit against Redding Medical Center in California. This resulted in an overall US$24 million payment to defrauded patients.

In 2011, Corapi was removed by his order from public ministry as a priest following allegations of misconduct, which he denied. By 2012, his website and his accounts on Facebook and Twitter had been closed.

As of 2021, no official information is available about John Corapi's activity, such as whether he was laicized or whether he is still affiliated with his order. In 2021, Matt C. Abbott posted an update quoting the Catholic lay evangelist and author Jesse Romero as saying that in 2016, Romero had unofficially been told by S.O.L.T.'s then-superior general that Corapi had "reconciled with his order", "was living the life of a monk in a monastery", was practicing "full-time prayer and penance", "had medical problems", and "will never speak in public again—by his choice and his superior’s choice as well."

== Life ==
=== Early years ===
Corapi was born and grew up in Hudson, New York. In high school, he was an American football player and an undistinguished student. In 1965, he entered the State University of New York at Albany, but returned to Hudson after academic difficulties.

=== Military service ===
Corapi joined the United States Army on April 16, 1967, serving as a clerk and typist. He was discharged in January 1970. He has said that he enlisted to join the Special Forces but was injured before completing his training.

=== Business Career ===
After his discharge in 1970, Corapi studied accounting at Pace University and graduated in 1973. He joined an accounting firm in Las Vegas, Nevada, where he audited hotels and casinos. In 1975, he became assistant comptroller at the Tropicana Resort & Casino. A year later, he took a position with the Nevada Gaming Control Board as an investigator. He later operated his own bookkeeping firm for about a year before moving to Los Angeles, California in 1978, where he became a real estate agent.

Corapi has stated that he was making a six-figure income in condominium conversions in the early 1980s; he lived in a waterfront home in Oxnard, California, and owned a Ferrari 308 GTS and a 60-foot yacht. At the height of his career in California, Corapi lived in a mansion in the affluent beachfront city of Malibu.

After being introduced to cocaine, he developed a substance abuse problem, sometimes spending as much as US$10,000 per week on illegal drugs. Corapi would later refer to his drug use as an encounter with a demon. His finances deteriorated and he eventually had a mental breakdown, suffering homelessness following a stay at a VA psychiatric hospital.

=== Religious conversion ===
Corapi spent three years wandering the streets of Los Angeles as a vagrant following his mental breakdown. His mother sent him a prayer card with the Hail Mary prayer and asked him to pray it once a day. He eventually changed his life, escaping homelessness and illicit sex and drugs. His mother sent him an airline ticket to New York, and he returned home. He lived with his mother for some time and returned to the practice of the Catholic faith after a conversion experience on June 24, 1984, making his first confession in several years. He later told his story in a series of sermons called "The Darkness Will Not Prevail".

Corapi entered Holy Apostles Seminary in Cromwell, Connecticut, in 1986 and earned an M.A. in Sacred Scripture. He joined the missionary community the Society of Our Lady of the Most Holy Trinity and on May 26, 1990, was ordained a deacon by René Henry Gracida, Bishop of Corpus Christi, Texas. He earned an S.T.B. degree from the University of Navarre in Pamplona, Spain.

=== Priesthood ===
On Trinity Sunday, May 26, 1991, Pope John Paul II ordained Corapi to the priesthood. Corapi says that Mother Teresa of Calcutta stood behind him at his ordination, and that he saw a vision of the Virgin Mary smelling lilacs on that day. Corapi's first assignments as a priest were at parishes in Hudson, New York and Robstown, Texas. Later, in the Catholic Diocese of Sacramento, he became the Director of Catholic Faith Formation and of the Bishop's Project on the Catechism of the Catholic Church. Corapi earned a doctorate in dogmatic theology from the University of Navarre. He became a regular contributor to the EWTN television and radio networks.

In 2008, Corapi curtailed his public appearances for reasons of health, but continued to produce audio and video programs from his studio in Montana. On August 15, 2009, Corapi made his first public appearance in over a year in Buffalo, New York for his "Lord and Giver of Life" conference at HSBC Arena. He completed and taped several conferences in 2010, including at San Antonio, Texas; St. Louis, Missouri; and Cincinnati, Ohio. In subsequent months, Corapi preached sermons on the dangers of socialism.

=== Qui tam False Claims Act lawsuit ===
In 2002 Corapi filed a qui tam False Claims Act lawsuit against Redding Medical Center cardiologist Chae Hyun Moon after Moon informed Corapi that year that he was in immediate need of triple bypass surgery, but then told Corapi that the procedure could wait three weeks. Corapi decided to seek other medical advice; his second doctor determined that he had perfectly clear arteries. Corapi ultimately went to the FBI and filed the suit that was the basis of an FBI raid and a multi-year investigation into Moon's practice.

In 2005 the United States Department of Justice reached a settlement with four cardiologists and Tenet Healthcare, the owner of Redding Hospital, in part due to the investigation following Corapi's initial complaint. Three physicians settled for a total of US$24 million. Moon, the target of Corapi's lawsuit, paid US$1.4 million and agreed never to perform cardiology procedures or surgeries on Medicare, Medi-Cal or Tricare patients. Moon's medical license was eventually revoked in 2007 for gross negligence, among other charges.

Corapi was awarded US$2,712,281 for his role as a whistleblower in the False Claims Act Lawsuit, as well as the US$500,000 he and his friend were awarded for the insurance case they filed. Stephen Klaidman explored Corapi's role as a whistle blower in his non-fiction book about the case, Coronary.

=== Allegations of misconduct ===
==== Administrative leave ====
In March 2011, Bishop William Mulvey of Corpus Christi, Texas, instructed the SOLT religious community to appoint two independent priests to investigate allegations by a former employee that Corapi had been in a relationship with her and was a drug addict. On March 18, 2011, Corapi was placed on administrative leave by his religious superior, Gerard Sheehan. Corapi denied the allegations and said the process was flawed. Sheehan issued a statement emphasizing that the suspension "in no way implies Father Corapi is guilty of the allegation."

Sheehan said that a fact-finding committee was formed consisting of two members of religious orders and a lay person. Its work was hampered by Corapi's refusal to release witnesses from non-disclosure agreements and the breach of contract lawsuit he filed against the principal accuser.

The television network EWTN suspended broadcasts by Corapi when he was placed on leave.

==== Leaving priestly ministry ====
On June 17, 2011, Corapi announced that he would no longer engage in public ministry as a priest. On a new website, titled "The Black Sheep Dog", Corapi wrote:

There are certain persons in authority in the Church that want me gone, and I shall be gone...They can't prove I'm guilty of the things alleged because I'm not, and they can't prove I'm innocent because that is simply illogical and impossible...My canon lawyer and my civil lawyers have concluded that I cannot receive a fair and just hearing under the Church's present process.

The Church will conclude that I am not cooperating with the process because I refuse to give up all of my civil and human rights in order to hold harmless anyone who chooses to say defamatory and actionable things against me with no downside to them. ... I am, indeed, not ready to be extinguished. Under the name "The Black Sheep Dog," I shall be with you through radio broadcasts and writing. My autobiography, The Black Sheep Dog, is almost ready for publication. My topics will be broader than in the past, and my audience likewise is apt to be broader. I'll do what I can under the circumstances.

On July 5, 2011, Sheehan, Corapi's religious superior in the Society of Our Lady of the Trinity, released a press statement accusing Corapi of drug and alcohol abuse, "sexting", having an affair with a former prostitute, and violating his promise of poverty as a perpetually professed member of the society by owning more than $1 million in real estate, numerous luxury vehicles, motorcycles, an ATV, a boat dock, and several motor boats. He stated, "SOLT's prior direction to Fr. John Corapi not to engage in any preaching or teaching, the celebration of the sacraments or other public ministry continues. Catholics should understand that SOLT does not consider Fr. John Corapi as fit for ministry."

On July 7, 2011, Corapi announced that he would not obey Sheehan's order to relocate from Montana and take up residence in a house of the society. According to a Catholic News Service report, he said he would not return to the order, and that he had resigned from the priesthood on June 17, twenty-two days after his 20th anniversary of priestly ordination (May 26, 1991).

I resigned because the process used by the church is grossly unjust, and, hence, immoral. I resigned because I had no chance from the beginning of a fair and just hearing. As I have indicated from the beginning of all this, I am not extinguished! If I were to commit to the suggestion of the society, then I would essentially crawl under a rock and wait to die.

== Activity post-2011 ==
In 2021, Matt C. Abbott posted an update quoting the Catholic lay evangelist and author Jesse Romero as saying that in 2016, Romero had unofficially been told by S.O.L.T.'s then-superior general that Corapi had "reconciled with his order", "was living the life of a monk in a monastery", was practicing "full-time prayer and penance", "had medical problems", and "will never speak in public again—by his choice and his superior’s choice as well."

== Published works ==
- The Theology of the Cross in the Magisterium of John Paul II (doctoral thesis) (Universidad de Navarra, Facultad de Teologia, 1992)
- The Cross of Christ in the Magisterium of John Paul II (1978–1992) (excerpts from doctoral thesis) (Sacra Theologia, Vol. XXV n. 3 (1994): 150–213)
- Ever Ancient, Ever New: A Collection of Articles on Various Subjects (Santa Cruz Media, 2005)
- Letters: A Collection of Short Letters from Father John Corapi (Santa Cruz Media, 2009)
- "Those Strong Feet That Followed After", in Welcome Home! Stories of Fallen-Away Catholics Who Came Back, edited by Victor R. Claveau (Ignatius Press, 2000)
