= Women in DSO =

American non-profit organization

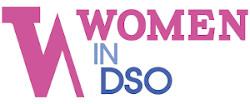
- Formation: 2019
- Founder: Aman Kaur
- Type: Nonprofit
- Headquarters: Kansas City, Missouri
- Location: United States
- Website: womenindso.org

Women in DSO is an American non-profit organization, which focuses on highlighting the contributions of women across the dental industry and promoting women leaders across the Dental Service Organizations.

== History ==
Women in DSO was created in 2019 by Dr. Aman Kaur with the intention to support the growth and empowerment of women leaders in DSOs and also to advance female leadership in dentistry.

In 2020, Women in DSO partnered with Henry Schein, Dykema DSO, DCA (Dental Care Alliance), Aspen Dental, Patterson Dental, Heartland Dental, Align, Darby Dental, SmileDirectClub, Dentsply Sirona and Overjet to further this mission and gained their support to build the supporting programs and networks.

== See also ==
- Dental service organizations
- Women in dentistry
- Women in dentistry in the United States
- List of dental organizations
