= Robert J. Moriarty =

American Marine F-4B fighter pilot (born 1946)

Robert James Moriarty
- Born: September 9, 1946; Schenectady, New York, U.S.
- Known for: The third man ever to fly between the pillars of the Eiffel Tower

Robert J. Moriarty (born September 9, 1946) is a former Marine F-4B fighter pilot.

He holds 14 international aviation records including the record for flight time between New York to Paris in two different categories.

On March 31, 1984, Moriarty flew a Beechcraft Bonanza between the pillars of the Eiffel Tower. He was part of a team entered in the Paris to Libreville air race but an engine failure south of Portugal forced him to drop out. After repairing the plane, he turned his attention to the Eiffel Tower. When asked why he had done it, he replied: "Just for fun".

== Family ==
He has a twin brother, James Robert Moriarty.
