= Kain Medrano =

American football player (born 2001)

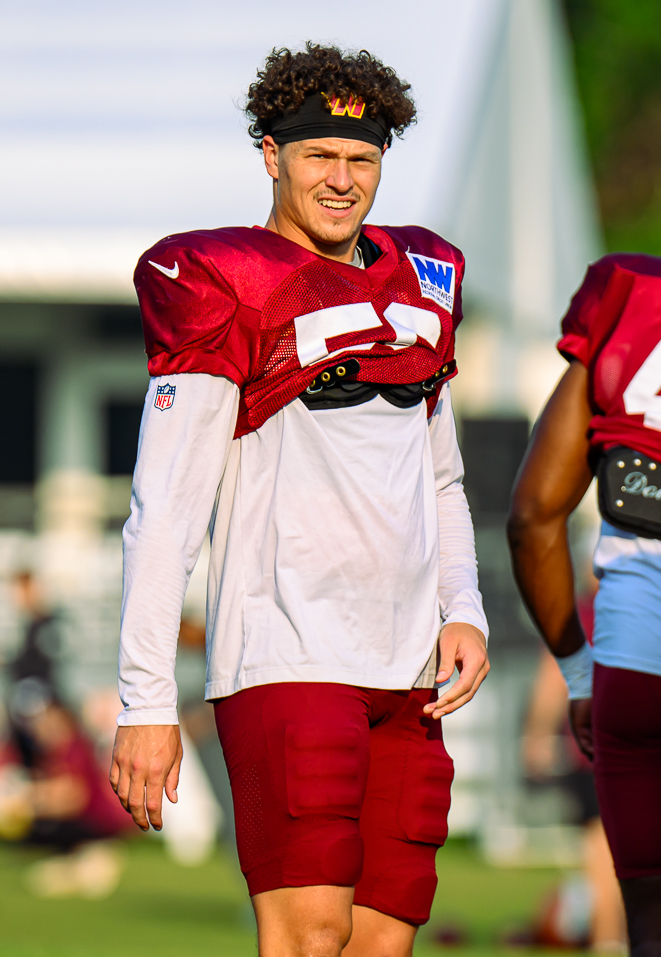
- Medrano with the Washington Commanders in 2025

No. 56 – Washington Commanders
- Position: Linebacker
- Roster status: Active

Personal information
- Born: February 16, 2001 (age 25); Pueblo, Colorado, U.S.
- Listed height: 6 ft 3 in (1.91 m)
- Listed weight: 230 lb (104 kg)

Career information
- High school: East (Pueblo)
- College: UCLA (2019–2024)
- NFL draft: 2025: 6th round, 205th overall pick

Career history
- Washington Commanders (2025–present)

Awards and highlights
- Third-team All-Big Ten (2024)

Career NFL statistics as of Week 9, 2026
- Total tackles: 17
- Fumble recoveries: 1
- Pass deflections: 1
- Interceptions: 1
- Defensive touchdowns: 1
- Stats at Pro Football Reference

Kain Medrano (born February 16, 2001) is an American professional football linebacker for the Washington Commanders of the National Football League (NFL). He played college football for the UCLA Bruins and was selected by the Commanders in the sixth round of the 2025 NFL draft.

== Early life ==
Medrano was born on February 16, 2001, in Pueblo, Colorado, later attending East High School. He was rated as a three-star recruit and committed to play college football for the UCLA Bruins, and had other offers from schools including Colorado State, Wyoming, Northern Arizona, and Northern Colorado.

== College career ==
In his first four collegiate seasons from 2019 to 2022, Medrano played sparingly, appearing in 25 games, where he notched 67 tackles with four being for a loss, four pass deflections, an interception, and a forced fumble for UCLA. In week 4 of the 2023 season, he notched ten tackles with two and a half being for a loss, two sacks, and a forced fumble which were all career-highs for Medrano versus the Utah Utes. In 2023, Medrano appeared in all 13 games for the Bruins, where he totaled 56 tackles with seven being for a loss, two sacks, two pass deflections, and a forced fumble. In week 3 of the 2024 season, he tallied three tackles in a loss against Indiana. In week 9, Medrano notched six tackles and an interception which he returned 38 yards for a touchdown in a win over Nebraska. In his final collegiate game in week 14, he notched eight tackles with three being for a loss, a sack, and a pass deflection in a 20-13 win over Fresno State. Medrano finished the 2024 season, appearing in all 12 games for the Bruins, where he notched 72 tackles with 11 being for a loss, a sack and a half, three forced fumbles, and two interceptions, where after the conclusion of the season he declared for the 2025 NFL draft.

== Professional career ==
Pre-draft measurables
Height	Weight	Arm length	Hand span	Wingspan	40-yard dash	10-yard split	20-yard split	20-yard shuttle	Three-cone drill	Vertical jump	Broad jump
6 ft 2 7/8 in (1.90 m)	222 lb (101 kg)	32 in (0.81 m)	9 1/8 in (0.23 m)	6 ft 5 1/4 in (1.96 m)	4.46 s	1.57 s	2.57 s	4.10 s	6.96 s	38.0 in (0.97 m)	10 ft 5 in (3.18 m)
All values from NFL Combine/Pro Day

Medrano was selected by the Washington Commanders in the sixth round (205th overall) of the 2025 NFL draft. He signed his four-year rookie contract on May 9, 2025. In his rookie season, he played primarily special teams over nine regular season games.

In the Week 3 win over Seattle Seahawks in the 2026 season, Medrano recorded his first career interception and touchdown with a pick-six against quarterback, Sam Darnold.
