= East High School (Pueblo, Colorado) =

Location
- 1521 Constitution Road; Pueblo, Colorado 81001; United States
- Coordinates: 38°17′24″N 104°34′38″W

Information
- School type: Public high school
- Established: 1959; 67 years ago
- School district: Pueblo 60
- CEEB code: 061197
- NCES School ID: 080612001040
- Principal: Andy Clementi
- Teaching staff: 52.69 (on an FTE basis)
- Grades: 9–12
- Gender: Coeducational
- Enrollment: 1,024 (2023–24)
- Student to teacher ratio: 19.43
- Colors: Gold and white
- Athletics conference: CHSAA
- Mascot: Eagle
- Feeder schools: Heaton Middle School; Risley School of Exploration
- Website: east.pueblod60.org

East High School, is one of thirteen public high schools in Pueblo, Colorado, United States. It offers the International Baccalaureate program. It is a part of Pueblo School District 60.

== Athletics ==
=== Fall sports ===
Boys

- Cross country
- Golf
- Football
- Soccer
- Tennis

Girls

- Cross country
- Softball
- Volleyball

=== Winter sports ===
Boys

- Basketball
- Wrestling

Girls

- Basketball
- Swimming and diving

=== Spring sports ===
Boys

- Baseball
- Track & field
- Swimming and diving

Girls

- Golf
- Soccer
- Tennis
- Track & field

== Notable alumni ==
- Nat Borchers - former Major League Soccer player
- Dan DeRose - businessperson, football player
- Rick Edgeman, American statistician and sustainability researcher, born 1954 in Pueblo, Colorado
- Darius Allen - former CFL player
- Kain Medrano - NFL linebacker for the Washington Commanders
