= Atlanta Technology Center =

Coordinates: 33°48′2.14″N 84°24′13.78″W

- Interactive map of the Atlanta Technology Center area

General information
- Status: Completed
- Type: Commercial offices
- Location: 1575 Northside Drive Atlanta, GA 30318
- Completed: 1986; 40 years ago
- Owner: Georgia Institute of Technology

Technical details
- Floor area: 197,357 square feet (18,335.1 m^{2})

Design and construction
- Developer: Trammell Crow Company

Atlanta Technology Center is an office park in Atlanta, Georgia. The 19-acre (7.7 ha) complex is located alongside Northside Drive and the old Atlanta railway, less than 1 mile (1.6 km) from Atlantic Station. The complex is near Interstate 75 and is 1 mile (1.6 km) north of Georgia Tech. It consists of four buildings, with a total of 197,357 square feet (18,335.1 m^{2}) of office space.

It is owned by the Georgia Institute of Technology.

Notable occupants include The Atlanta Opera, GE Healthcare, Golin Harris, Kool Smiles, Grady Memorial Hospital, and Otis Elevator.

== History ==
Trammell Crow Company, the original developer, opened the first buildings in 1986. The complex was scheduled to open in May 1986. As f June 1988, the center was 52% leased.

Mobley said that the close proximity to Georgia Institute of Technology, which houses the Advanced Technology Development Center (ATDC), is the crucial aspect in regards to the commercial success to the technology center. In April 1986 the ATDC was fully leased. During that month he said the development was starting to receive spillover from the ATDC. Mobley said that Trammell Crow built an office complex at that location because of "the many new exciting companies often headed by Georgia Tech grads who prefer a close-in location and the accessibility to the Advanced Technology Development Center and Georgia Tech resources." From the beginning the complex had the name "Atlanta Technology Center." Tony Wilbert of the Atlanta Journal-Constitution said that the naming decision reflected foresight and that the name "proved to be prophetic in the late 1990s as fast-growing technology companies sought out office space near Georgia Tech."

MOM Corp once leased 29,000 square feet (2,700 m^{2}) of space at the center. By September 1987 the company had failed to pay rent due to increasing financial troubles, and police almost evicted the company on September 15. The owners renegotiated the lease to a third of the original space under their names and gained a reprieve. On Saturday September 26, the landlord at the Atlanta Technology Center announced that the lease for MOM Corp would be terminated on September 30 of that month.

In 2000, an entity controlled by Julian LeCraw & Co. paid $20.5 million for the property. Julian LeCraw Jr. said that his firm acquired the development because the prominence of the area was increasing. In 2000 LeCraw said that the land that contains the complex was likely worth $200,000 per acre. In June 2000, the complex had 3,000 square feet (280 m^{2}) of vacant space. By June 2000 LeCraw & Co. had already partly owned Building 100. During that month it purchased the other four buildings and the remaining share in Building 100.

On October 4, 2010, The Atlanta Opera extended its lease in the center. The center allowed the company to not pay rent during August, a month which historically had low fundraising results, for the following four years. The group also decided to expand its rental space to a total of 15,559 square feet (1,445.5 m^{2}). Paul Melroy, the managing director of The Atlanta Opera, said that the group decided to stay because the landlord offered an attractive deal.

In 2011, Carter was hired to sell the complex, which at that time had an average historical occupancy rate of 94%.

In 2018, Georgia Institute of Technology acquired the property.
