= Dan DeRose =

American football player (born 1962)

No. 59
- Position: Linebacker

Personal information
- Born: January 25, 1962 (age 64); Pueblo, Colorado, U.S.
- Listed height: 6 ft 0 in (1.83 m)
- Listed weight: 230 lb (104 kg)

Career information
- High school: East (Pueblo, Colorado)
- College: Colorado State University Pueblo
- NFL draft: 1983: undrafted

Career history
- Denver Broncos (1983)*; New York Giants (1987)
- * Offseason or practice squad member only

Career NFL statistics
- Interceptions: 1
- Stats at Pro Football Reference

Daniel Eugene DeRose (born January 25, 1962) is a businessperson from Pueblo, Colorado. He is a member of the DeRose family. He owned the business DD Marketing, a business which negotiated soft drink contracts for schools. He was previously a college football player and athletic director for Colorado State University Pueblo (previously University of Southern Colorado). He had also played for the New York Giants in 1987 in a strike-breaking team. He also was one of the principal owners of Small Smiles Dental Centers.

== History ==
DeRose attended East High School in Pueblo, Colorado and played American football there. DeRose attended the University of Southern Colorado (USC), now known as Colorado State University Pueblo (CSU Pueblo). He received a Bachelor of Science degree in business management in 1984 and received a Master of Business Administration in 1985.

In the early 1980s DeRose served as a linebacker for USC. He also served as an athletic director for the university. By 1994 DeRose re-established the school's baseball program and had a new stadium complex built for baseball. Baseball had been previously ended in 1984 due to budget cuts. DeRose was also the owner, founder, and head coach of the Pueblo Crusaders, a Minor League Football System team. He served as the middle linebacker of the team. DeRose and Ed Watkins, who became the president of the league, met in late 1986, establishing the league. He also was the defensive captain of the 1987 New York Giants strike replacement team. He also tried out as a free agent for the Denver Broncos and has made attempts to re-establish the American football team of CSU Pueblo.

Under DD Marketing, DeRose negotiated exclusive soft drink contracts with U.S. school districts. DeRose's business model was against the previous system of soft drink manufacturers making low bids for exclusive soft drink contracts; school districts did not have the time or inclination to pursue alternatives to the low bids and had accepted the low bids. Under DeRose, school districts were able to get more lucrative contracts. In 1998 DeRose said that he negotiated such contracts for 63 school districts. DD Marketing marketed "Zap Me," a program that places computers in schools. The computers installed by the program included advertisements seen in corners of the computer screens. DeRose expressed favor for placing advertisements in schools, saying that if there are no advertisements in schools, "it doesn't give our young people an accurate picture of our society." DeRose argued that it was not his role to tell schools to accept advertising. Andrew Hagelshaw, the senior program director of the Center for Commercial Free Public Education, said that DeRose "really illustrates the worst aspects of commercialism in schools" and that he was "making millions of dollars off commercializing public schools, and he is not taking into account any of the negatives." Constance L. Hays of The New York Times said that "Several critics compare Mr. De Rose to the title character in The Music Man, the musical about a small town falling for a charlatan's pitch."

Dan DeRose was one of the owners of Small Smiles Dental Centers, which was found to be exploiting children for profiting off medicaid and ordered to pay $24 million and interest to settle against these allegation . According to his brother, Michael DeRose, Dan DeRose provided some management and marketing services for the company. In 2006 the owners of Small Smiles, including Dan DeRose, sold the company. DD Marketing was not a part of the sale. In 2007 Dan DeRose announced that he was going to give a gift to CSU Pueblo's American football team. It was the largest gift in the school's history. In 2007, at the Sangre de Cristo Arts and Conference Center, Dan DeRose received Charles W. Crew Business Leader of the Year award from the Pueblo Chamber of Commerce. In 2010, the Sons of Italy awarded DeRose, an Italian American, with the Golden Lion Award for his work with CSU Pueblo and the Pueblo, Colorado community. In 2012, he was elected as the chairperson of the board of trustees of CSU Pueblo.

== Publications ==
- DeRose, Dan. "Business, schools both win." (Op-ed) USA Today. March 27, 1998. p. 12A.
