= Society of Our Lady of the Most Holy Trinity =

Roman Catholic society of apostolic life

- Abbreviation: Post-nominal letters SOLT
- Formation: 16 July 1958 (68 years ago)
- Founder: Fr.James Flanagan, SOLT
- Founded at: Archdiocese of Santa Fe, New Mexico, US
- Type: Society of Apostolic Life
- Headquarters: Corpus Christi, Texas
- Region served: American Region; Mexico; Belize; Guatemala; United States of America; Asia-Pacific Region; Australia; China; Papua New Guinea; Philippines; Thailand
- Motto: Imitate Mary, Become like Jesus, Live for the Triune God
- General Priest Servant: Fr.Peter Marsalek,SOLT
- Website: www.solt.net

The Society of Our Lady of the Most Holy Trinity (SOLT) is a society of apostolic life within the Roman Catholic Church. It was founded in 1958 by Father James H. Flanagan, a priest from the United States. The Society maintains missions in various countries, describing itself as Marian-Trinitarian, Catholic, missionary, and family. Membership in the Society includes priests, permanent deacons, religious sisters, religious brothers, and the lay faithful.

== Charism ==
The charism (gift) which the Society brings to the Church is to be:

- Disciples of Jesus through Mary, living in Marian-Trinitarian communion and serving on ecclesial family teams in areas of deepest apostolic need.

While in the seminary, Father Flanagan realized that organizations where people work as a team, recognizing and accepting individual talents, are the ones which are most successful. This is why the Society strives to have priests, permanent deacons, religious sisters, religious brothers, and lay faithful in all of its communities, no matter how small.

== Foundation ==
In 1957, five years after his ordination to the priesthood, Flanagan approached Cardinal James Richard Cushing, then Roman Catholic Archbishop of Boston, with his idea. Cushing gave his support. Soon after, Edwin Byrne, the Archbishop of Santa Fe, invited Flanagan to his diocese where he met the future co-founder of SOLT, Father John McHugh. Byrne formally established the Society as a pious union on 16 July 1958, the feast of Our Lady of Mount Carmel.

== Religious formation ==
After several meetings, those who feel called to be either a priest or religious brother in the Society spend an aspirancy year in either Belize or Belcourt, North Dakota. This is a year when the aspirants experience living simply and without many material comforts, enabling them to better understand the work of the Society. Those who remain interested begin the novitiate year. Until 2011, this year was conducted in Capulin, Colorado; now the novices spend the time at the Society's house in Corpus Christi, Texas. This year is crucial, for it is then that the novices

better understand their divine vocation, and indeed one which is proper to the institute, experience the manner of living of the institute, and form their mind and heart in its spirit, and so that their intention and suitability are tested.

Thus, the novices are given the opportunity for longer periods of prayer and spiritual reading as well as silence in order to reflect on the vocation God is offering and nature of their response. The spiritual development of the novice is of particular focus, especially through spiritual direction. At the end the year the novices receive the religious habit (robes) of the Society and take the simple vows of poverty, chastity and obedience. It is then that the person officially becomes a member of the Society:

By religious profession, members assume the observance of the three evangelical counsels by public vow, are consecrated to God through the ministry of the Church, and are incorporated into the institute with the rights and duties defined by law.

Following the novitiate, religious formation continues in one of two directions.

=== Priests ===
Those called to the priesthood pursue their academic studies. Prior to 2011, the Society sent its students without any philosophy for a two-year course at Our Lady of Corpus Christi College in Texas, and those with philosophy for a four-year theology degree at the Pontifical University of Saint Thomas Aquinas, Angelicum, in Rome. Beginning with the 2011-12 academic year, all students were sent to Sacred Heart Major Seminary in Detroit, Michigan, which provides both philosophy and theology courses. The students live in a house of studies and commute to the seminary proper.

After completing courses in theology, the candidates for ordination participate in a pastoral year, six months of which is in a Spanish-speaking country and six months going through the Society's Ecclesial Team programme. This is followed by perpetual promises, ordination to the diaconate, and then priesthood between six and twelve months later. For most newly ordained priests, ordination is followed by an assignment to one of the Society's various communities, either in the US or abroad. However, some may be asked to attend the Angelicum in Rome for further studies.

=== Sisters ===
The Sisters affirm that:

A vocation is a call from God. We have existed in the mind of God from all eternity and God has chosen this time in history to place us on this earth. He has a particular mission for each one of us and it is up to us to discover this wonderful plan. Some people are called to the single life, some people are called to the vocation of marriage and others to the vocation of religious life. When we find our vocation, we find our mission and we find the fullness of happiness.

After spending some time, normally a week, living with the Sisters, women who believe that they may be called to the religious life undergo what is called "aspirancy" during which they discern whether or not to begin the process. This is followed by a year-long postulancy period of living with the community, during which time the women learn more about the practicalities of living the life of a sister as well as deepening their relationship with God.

The postulancy is followed by a two-year novitiate, at the beginning of which the women are clothed with the Society's religious habit. The first year is devoted to living in one of the various apostolates. The second year is that required by Canon Law during which the focus is on learning more about the evangelical counsels, prayer, spirituality, and the Constitutions of the Society. At the end of the novitiate, simple promises are made; these are renewed annually for five years after which perpetual promises are made.

The Sisters serve alongside the other members of the Society in a variety of areas such as health care, education, evangelisation, drug rehabilitation, homeless people, foster care, orphaned children, and parish work. They also operate a bookstore which provides Catholic reading and devotional materials.

=== Brothers ===
Those called to be lay brothers begin what the Society terms an "intellectual year" during which time is spent studying such things as the Bible, Church history, and Catholic doctrine.

This is followed by a pastoral year, the first six months of which takes place in a country other than the brother's native land. The remainder of the year is spent at the Society's headquarters in Corpus Christi, Texas, where they learn how to operate within the framework of the Society's ecclesial team structure. Brothers of the Society are currently receiving their subsequent formation in Detroit, Michigan. While they are not ordained and thus do not celebrate the sacraments, they serve in a variety of important apostolates according to the talents of each brother. These include such areas as prison ministry, people with HIV, administration, counseling, and parish work. A brother ministers

not by preaching with words, but in the example of the great St Francis who said, "Preach the Gospel always, and use words when necessary.

=== Lay faithful ===
Those who feel called to this ministry undergo a period of prayerful reflection, discussion, and formation under the guidance of one of the Society's priests and, preferably, with others of the same disposition. They also participate in the ecclesial team training program.

The purpose of the program is to develop the lay missionaries' faith, Christian spirituality, and sense of vocation as well as foster a deeper understanding of what it means to be a missionary, understanding and respecting the culture where they will serve.

== Missions ==
The Society serves in numerous countries.

- Belize: parishes, education, evangelisation, pro-life work and radio
  - Belize City
    - Divine Mercy Parish
    - Our Lady of Mercy Montessori
  - Benque Viejo del Carmen
    - Our Lady of Mount Carmel Parish and Elementary School
    - Mount Carmel High School
    - John Paul the Great College
  - San José Succotz
  - Arenal & Calla Creek
  - San Pedro, Ambergris Caye
    - San Pedro Parish
    - San Pablo
- Guatemala: parishes and ministering to indigenous people
  - Melchor de Mencos
- Mexico: parishes, orphans, schools, health care, abandoned elderly people
  - Nuevo Laredo
    - Nuestra Señora del Refugio
  - Colón
    - Santa María del Mexicano
- Papua New Guinea: parishes, primary schools, justice and peace
- Philippines: parishes, education, formation of religious and social development
- Thailand: chemical dependency, AIDS, rural workers
- U.S.A.: parishes, education, youth camps, retreats, migrant workers, Hispanic and African-American communities.
  - Detroit, MI
    - Most Holy Redeemer Parish and School
    - St. Cunegunde
    - St. Gabriel
  - Corpus Christi, Texas
    - Our Lady of Corpus Christi Chapel and Retreat Center
    - St. Joseph Parish
    - Christ the King Parish
    - Our Lady of Guadalupe Parish
  - Robstown, Texas
    - St. Anthony Parish and School
    - St. John Nepomucene Parish
  - Kansas City, MO
    - St. Louis Parish
    - Our Lady's Montessori School
  - Turtle Mountain Reservation in Belcourt, North Dakota
    - St. Ann Parish and School
    - St. Anthony's
    - St. Michael's in Dunseith
  - Mora, New Mexico
    - St. Gertrude Parish
  - Holman, New Mexico
  - Covington, Georgia
    - Lay Community
  - Phoenix, AZ
    - Most Holy Trinity Parish
  - Carroll, Iowa
    - Domus Trinitatis Retreat Center

== Structure ==
The Society is led by a General Priest Council, composed of a General Priest Servant and his four assistants. The General Sister Council and General Lay Council fully collaborate in the governance and administration of the Society. The respective General Councils meet quarterly in Joint Council. There are also two Regional Priest Councils, one for the Asia-Pacific Region and the other for the American Region, as well as Regional Sister and Lay Councils.

== John Corapi case ==
In 2011 controversy arose concerning John Corapi, one of the Society's priests, a man well known for his lively preaching, frequent appearances on EWTN, and writing several books. Corapi was accused of breaking his promise of celibacy with more than one woman and of violating his vow of poverty by amassing significant wealth. The initial allegations were a shock to those Catholics who saw him as a defender of traditional Catholic teaching on all fronts. Along with complaints of being unfairly treated and about "certain persons in authority in the Church that want me gone," Corapi asserted his innocence but also said that he was resigning from the priesthood.

In June, the Society responded, outlined the process which had taken place, and that it had received a letter (dated 3 June 2011) from Corapi in which he said that he could no longer serve either as a priest or as a member of the Society. The Society's response also made it clear that no conclusion had been reached at that time. On 5 July 2011, the Society released another statement in which it said that all canonical norms had been followed and that Corapi did

have sexual relations and years of cohabitation (in California and Montana) with a woman known to him, when the relationship began, as a prostitute. He repeatedly abused alcohol and drugs; he has recently engaged in sexting activity with one or more women in Montana. He holds legal title to over $1 million in real estate, numerous luxury vehicles, motorcycles, an ATV, a boat dock, and several motor boats, which is a serious violation of his promise of poverty as a perpetually professed member of the Society.

In the same statement, the Society also asserted that Corapi had offered $100,000 to the woman making accusations in return for her silence and that he may have entered similar contracts with key witnesses who refused to supply the investigation with statements or documents.

== See also ==
- Consecrated life
- Institutes of consecrated life
- Religious institute (Catholic)
- Secular institute
- Vocational Discernment in the Catholic Church
