= Kool Smiles =

American dental company

Kool Smiles, PC
- Type: Private
- Industry: Dentistry
- Founded: East Lake, Atlanta, U.S. in 2002
- Founder: Dr. Tu Tran, Dr. Thien Pham
- Headquarters: Marietta, GA, U.S.
- Number of locations: 100+
- Area served: United States
- Services: Dentistry
- Owner: Dr. Tu Tran
- Website: mykoolsmiles.com

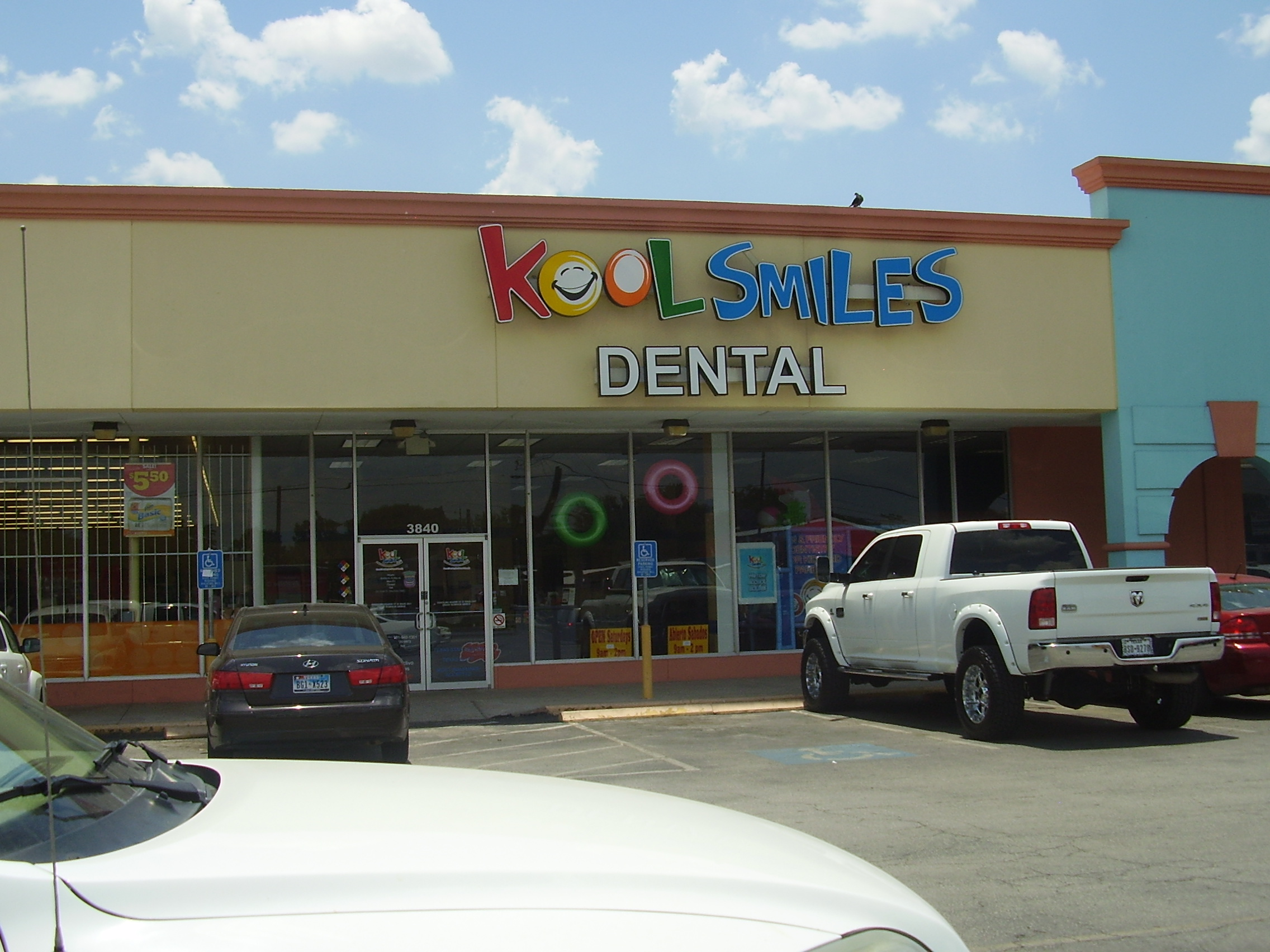
Kool Smiles Houston-Aldine dental clinic in unincorporated Harris County, Texas

Kool Smiles is a dental services provider, based in the United States. Its headquarters are in the Kool Smiles Patient Support Center in Marietta, Georgia, U.S., in Greater Atlanta and has over 100 offices located across sixteen states.

Kool Smiles operates dental clinics located in low-income communities. Kool Smiles positions itself as a general dentistry that treats both children and adults.The company recruits for general dentists, pediatric dentists, endodontists and oral surgeons.

Kool Smiles provides preventive care, diagnostic imaging and restorative care supported by electronic health records, as well as the free curriculum on oral health and dental care.

In 2018, a number of Kool Smiles clinics were rebranded after the company was forced to pay $23.9 million to settle federal charges of Medicaid fraud and was sued over the death of 2-year-old Zion Gastelum at an Arizona clinic.

== History ==
In August 2002, the first Kool Smiles location opened in East Lake, Atlanta, in DeKalb County, near the city of Decatur. The clinic only accepted patients on Medicaid and PeachCare, Georgia's state insurance program. Brown said "The demand for service was unbelievable. These kids had nowhere to go for years and years." Brown said that originally they planned to open ten to fifteen clinics.

By 2005, Kool Smiles had opened six clinics in Georgia and two in Indianapolis, Indiana, and it had plans to open new clinics in Massachusetts and Virginia. It accepted patients on Medicaid and state insurance plans and patients who did "self-pay". They did not accept private insurance. In 2007, it had 10 clinics in Georgia. Around that year, it served 71,000 children annually at its Georgia clinics. In 2008, the chain had about 40 clinics in seven U.S. states. In 2009 it operated 84 clinics in the entire United States.

After the WellCare and Peach State Medicaid networks followed through with plans to terminate Kool Smiles from their contracts, patients of Kool Smiles and another company filed an injunction that would prevent the terminations until WellCare and the Peach State organizations would show that the ending of the contracts would not contradict Medicaid dental program requirements. Kool Smiles' Chief Dental Officer, Dr. David Strange, argued that if it lost the contract, some families in Columbus, Georgia, would be unable to receive dental care. Kool Smiles remained part of the Amerigroup Medicaid network and later resumed participation in the WellCare and Peach State Medicaid networks. Kool Smiles currently participates in all of the Medicaid networks in Georgia.

Kool Smiles has partnered with the Gary Community Health Center and the East Chicago Community Health Center to provide dental care in their facilities. The company has also partnered with the Governor of Maryland, Martin O'Malley, on his "Healthy Smiles Tour" to improve access to dental care in the state.

In 2010 Kool Smiles generated $80 million in earnings before interest, taxes, depreciation and amortization (EBITDA). During that year the company hired Harris Williams, an investment bank, in order to sell itself. The company was said to be worth $700 million. As of October 4, 2010, American Securities LLC was the lead bidder. The deal failed and the company was not sold.

=== Medicaid fraud allegations and settlement ===
In 2012, Frontline aired a report saying that Kool Smiles inappropriately used crowns on young patients instead of regular fillings, because Medicaid bills more for crowns, and that the company pressured dentists to go along with the usage of crowns to make more money for the company. Kool Smiles responded by saying that, "Dentists do not receive revenue, patient or procedure targets or scorecards." Kool Smiles pointed to a study authored by presidential economist Arthur Laffer, which reviewed Texas Medicaid claims data and concluded that, in 2011, Kool Smiles charged less and performed fewer procedures, including crowns, per patient than other Medicaid dental providers in the state. The company said, "Unfortunately, Frontline ignores what all dentists know – children with long-neglected dental needs require more medical care." Later it was revealed Frontline had used a former employee as a source who was a convicted felon, who was suing the company after being terminated for allegedly falsifying documents. In response, Frontline acknowledged that their analysis showed that Kool Smiles provided 25% fewer crowns per patient (2.1 vs. 2.8) than the average dentist, but maintained that "patients going to Kool Smiles were twice as likely on average to get crowns" in Virginia, and 50% more likely in Texas.

Around the same time, a number of studies were carried out regarding the adoption of Dental Service Organizations for many states. As one of the leading providers of DSOs in the United States, Kool Smiles' statistics were regularly quoted during this period. The result of regular care through DSOs meant that Kool Smiles' patients had an overall average monthly Medicaid expenditure that was 33% lower than non-Kool Smiles patients and that Kool Smiles providers perform 15 percent fewer procedures per patient.

In January 2018, Kool Smiles agreed to pay $23.9 million to settle Medicaid fraud charges. The federal government alleged that the company filed false claims for unneeded dental procedures performed on children, including tooth removals, pulpotomies, and installing stainless steel crowns. The company was also accused of billing for services it did not actually render.

=== Death of Zion Gastelum, rebranding, and bankruptcy ===
Zion Gastelum, 2, died on December 20, 2017 after a visit to a Kool Smiles dental clinic in Yuma, Arizona, where he became unresponsive after being placed under anesthesia by Dr. Aaron Roberts. Zion's parents subsequently sued Kool Smiles and Roberts for medical malpractice. The suit claimed that "a Kool Smiles staff member silenced the alarm on the pulse oximeter, which is used to monitor a patient's pulse and oxygen saturation", and that "Zion was left alone in the recovery room and an oxygen tank Zion was hooked up to was either empty or not working properly."

Zion's was the second death of a child linked to the same dental office, which subsequently rebranded as Manzana Dental, as part of a larger rebranding of many Kool Smiles clinics. Other rebranded Kool Smiles clinics include Cortland Dental (MA), Pippin Dental (IN), Elstar Dental (TX), Pinova Dental (TX), Jubilee Dental (TX), Creston Dental and Braces (SC), Pine Dental (MD & VA), Sutton Dental (CT), Taylor Dental (LA), Ruby Dental (KY), and Dorsett Dental (AZ).

On August 13, 2020, Kool Smiles' parent, Benevis, filed for Chapter 11 bankruptcy protection.

== Business & Services ==
The company headquarters are located in the Kool Smiles Patient Support Center in Suite 290 of the Northchase Office Park building in Marietta, Georgia, U.S., in Greater Atlanta. At one time its headquarters were in Suite 440 of Building 400 of the Atlanta Technology Center in Atlanta. At a later time its headquarters were in Suite 800 of the Galleria 400 building in unincorporated Cobb County.

In 2011, two million patients visited Kool Smiles clinics. Kool Smiles is a privately held company with over 1000 employees reported in October, 2011

Kool Smiles has provided more than $100 million in free care to poor children and their families since 2005. May 15, 2016 is "Sharing Smiles Day," the annual day on which Kool Smiles locations offer free care to uninsured children under the age of 18.

=== Statistics ===
During 2008, Kool Smiles treated 18,000 children in the Georgia area, whose families had no medical insurance. The check-ups came as part of a government initiative, with the treatment being the first dental treatment the children had received in many cases. By 2011, two million patients visited Kool Smiles clinics.

As part of Kool Smiles' work in South Carolina, the percentage of Medicaid-enrolled children receiving dental services increased from 46.9 percent to 51.9 percent. The statistics were announced in 2011 when the dental practice opened its seventh clinic in the state.

A study conducted in 2015 by Dobson DaVanzo concluded states could save more than $550 million annually in Medicaid expenditures provided care as conservatively as Kool Smiles, which does 25% fewer services at a 37% lower cost than others providing care to the same patient population.

== See also ==
- All Smiles Dental Centers
- Aspen Dental
- Medicaid Dental Center
- ReachOut Healthcare America
- Small Smiles Dental Centers
- Delta Dental
