= Sun Orthodontix =

American orthodontics office company

National Orthodontix Mgmt, Pllc, doing business as Sun Orthodontix, and previously Orthodontix LTD, is an orthodontics office company. The company has six offices in Texas and New Mexico, including three in El Paso, one in Corpus Christi, one in Victoria, and one in Las Cruces, New Mexico. John G. Vondrak is the founder of the company. In 2010 records from the State of Texas stated that the company collected $9.6 million in Medicaid funds. In 2010 it was the second-largest biller for dental braces under Medicaid in the state.

On February 17, 2012, the State of Texas placed a payment hold on the company. By July 2012 the company announced that it no longer accepted Medicaid payments. Daniel Borunda of The El Paso Times said that some patients complained that they were not informed that the offices would no longer accept Medicaid until June 2012. During that month Borunda said that allegations that the company is trying to force patients previously covered under Medicaid to pay for their braces. By early September 2012 the company had sent a form letter stating that the Texas Medicaid program had made coverage changes and stopped paying dentists for several services, and so Sun Orthodontix could no longer participate in the Medicaid program. Stephanie Goodman, the communications director of the Texas Health and Human Services Commission, said that the state did not drop any children from Medicaid and did not modify the state's Medicaid coverage. Goodman stated that the Medicaid program only covers braces when there are medical justifications and not when aesthetics is the only consideration. The Medicaid program is only supposed to cover orthodontics if it corrects severe conditions such as cleft lip and palate or complications from another condition, such as Down's syndrome or muscular dystrophy. The Office of Inspector General of the commission had investigated several companies in Texas for orthodontic Medicaid fraud.

In September 2012 the Federal Bureau of Investigation, the Texas Attorney General, and Texas state investigators raided the Sun Orthodontix offices. Byron Harris of WFAA said, "[t]he joint raid is the largest action so far against a dental firm in Texas." Sun Orthodontix sued the state, saying that it is trying to collect the money that the state owes to the company. As of September 2012 the state has not filed any criminal charges against the company or Sun Orthodontix dentists. Jim Moriarty, a lawyer who had started a lawsuit against All Smiles Dental Centers, accusing it of orthodontics fraud, said "The FBI doesn't show up when they think you've committed a crime... they know you've committed a crime long before they show up."

Vondrak sold this company to his daughter, Camaron Martin, and a family friend, Ashley Smith, and the chain's name is now SmileLife Orthodontics.
