= Small Smiles Dental Centers =

American dental company

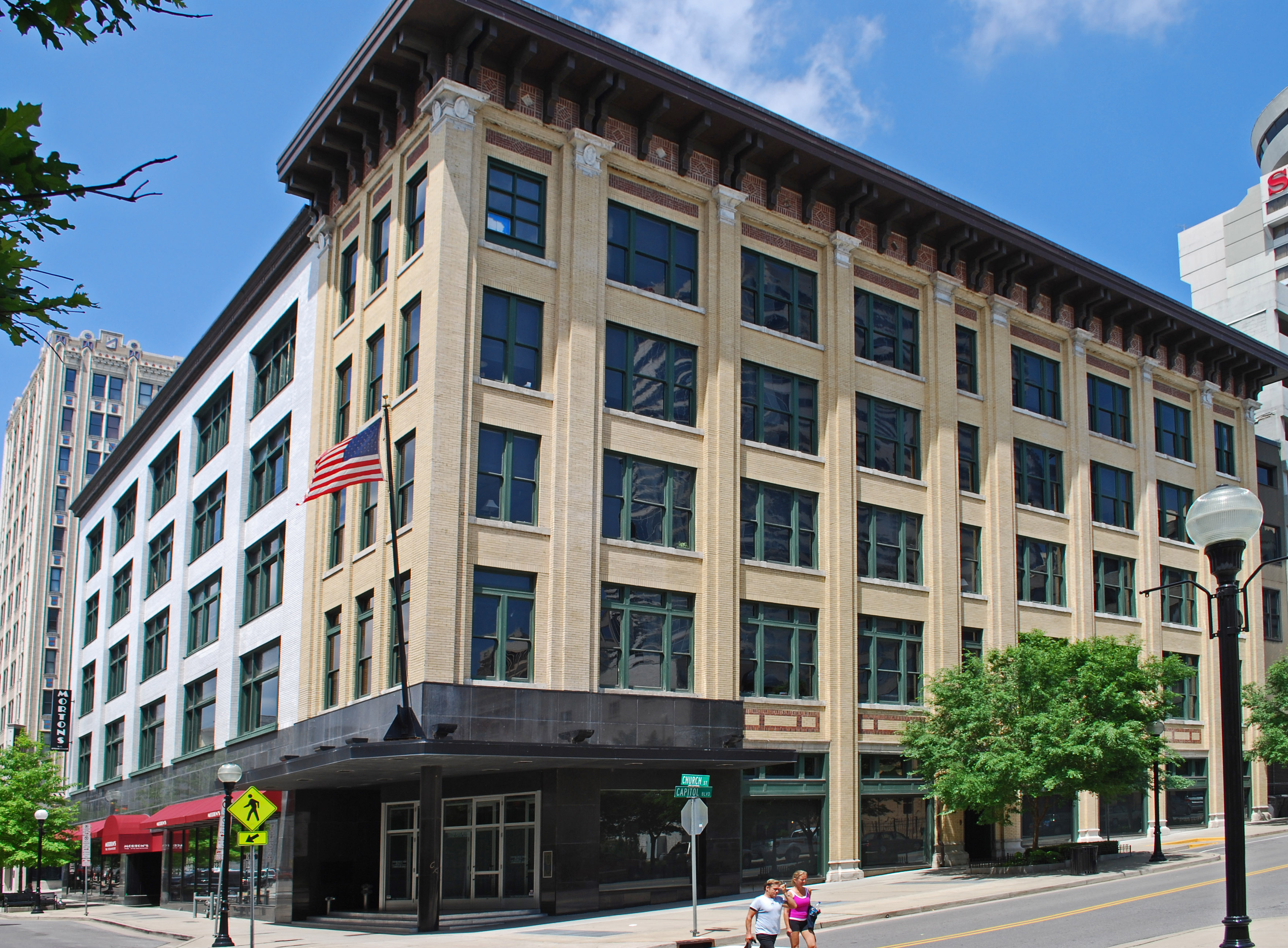
Castner-Knott Building, headquarters of Small Smiles

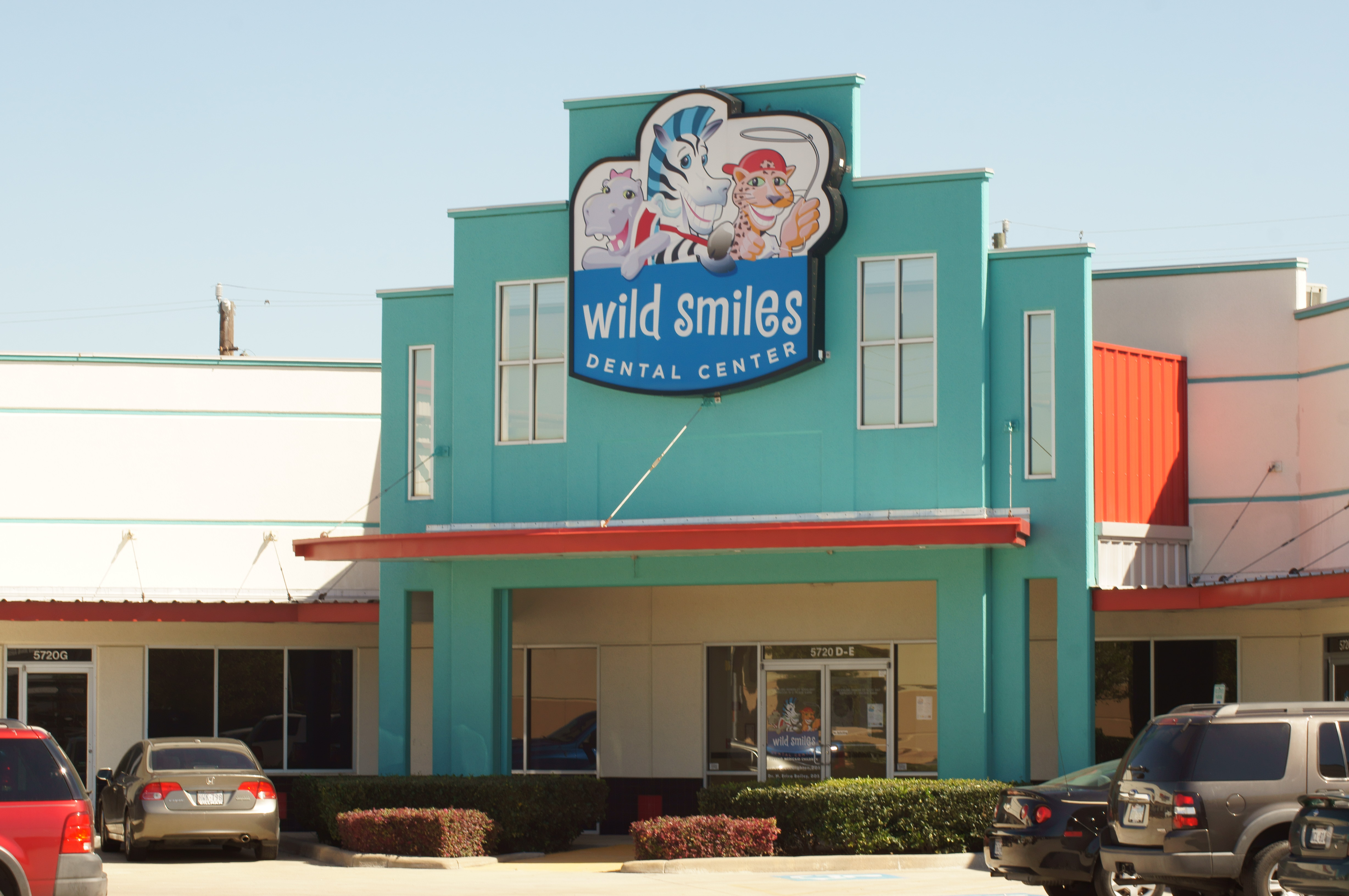
Wild Smiles Dental Center in Houston

Small Smiles Dental Centers was a privately owned US chain of dental clinics focused on serving children from low-income families. The parent company, Church Street Health Management (CSHM), has its headquarters in Suite 520 of the Castner-Knott Building in Nashville, Tennessee. As of 2010, Church Street (previously known as Forba Holdings LLC or FORBA) was the largest dental management company in the United States, and for a period it was the largest dental chain for children in the United States. As of March 2014, Small Smiles had 53 offices, and it stated that it served hundreds of thousands of children annually. As of September 2021, Small Smiles appeared to have one location in Reno, Nevada.

Throughout the chain's history, it faced accusations of providing unnecessary dental care and improper restraint of child patients. In January 2010, it gained national attention when FORBA settled False Claims Act allegations with the United States Department of Justice for $24 million. As of January 1, 2011, FORBA changed its name to its current name, Church Street Health Management. The new name was a reference to the street address of the company's corporate headquarters. It filed for Chapter 7 bankruptcy on February 5, 2015.

Small Smiles clinics operated under multiple names, including Children's Dental Clinic, Indian Springs Dental Clinic, Oklahoma Smiles, Small Smiles Dentistry, Texas Smiles, and Wild Smiles.

== History ==
=== As a family practice ===
Small Smiles originated from a dental office that was opened in 1928 in Pueblo, Colorado. Initially Small Smiles was a family-owned business headed by the Italian American DeRose family of Pueblo and a Denver, Colorado dentist named William Mueller. Bruno DeRose, the founder of the practice, had graduated from dental school in 1928. The DeRose Dental Clinic opened that year. In 1961 Edward DeRose, the father of Michael DeRose began practicing dentistry. After Medicaid was established in 1967, the Pueblo DeRose office was one of the first ones to accept Medicaid. Michael DeRose, a graduate of the Creighton University dental school began practicing at Small Smiles in 1982. According to Michael DeRose, Dan DeRose provided some management and marketing services. Mueller and Adolph Padula, an uncle of Michael DeRose, each had some financial interest in some clinics.

In 1995, the second Small Smiles clinic opened in Colorado Springs, Colorado. Business increased after the clinic opened. Throughout the 1990s, three additional Small Smiles offices opened in Colorado and New Mexico. Michael DeRose subsequently bought into a chain of dental clinics in North Carolina, Medicaid Dental Centers, operating Smile Starters and Carolina Dental Center clinics.

In 2000, the Small Smiles company began expanding throughout the United States. During that year, FORBA, LLC (FOR Better Access) was formed, providing dental care to children across the United States.

In May 2004, the DeRose family had a financial stake in 21 dental clinics in eight states, including Arizona, Colorado, Georgia, Indiana, Kansas, New Mexico, North Carolina, and South Carolina. The clinics altogether employed 70 dentists. By May 29 of that year, the dental clinics that had most recently opened were in Florence, South Carolina and Kansas City, Kansas. Vogrin said that the DeRose family "built something of a dental dynasty." As of October 2004, within the State of Colorado, Small Smiles had clinics in Aurora, Colorado Springs, Denver, Pueblo, and Thornton. As of that year, the vast majority of low income children on Medicaid in El Paso County went to Small Smiles. The company also had an advertising agreement with Colorado Springs School District 11. As of May 20, 2004, the Colorado clinics had 25 dentists. Two were pediatric dentists and the others were general dentists. According to a phone survey from the Colorado Springs Gazette, aside from Small Smiles, few other Colorado Springs dental offices took patients who were on Medicaid.

By 2004, The Colorado Springs Gazette reported that Small Smiles used papoose boards almost 7,000 times in one 18-month period. According to Colorado state records, Michael and Edward DeRose said that they used papoose boards so that they could do dental work on larger numbers of children in a more rapid manner. Small Smiles dentists from other states learned the papoose board method in Colorado and began practicing the method in other states. As a result, a Colorado Board of Dental Examiners appointed committee established a new Colorado state law forbidding the usage of papoose boards for children unless a dentist has exhausted other possibilities for controlling a child's behavior, and if the dentist uses a papoose board, he or she must document why the papoose board was used in the patient's record. In a related development, Medicaid Dental Centers came under fire in 2003 when WCNC-TV in Charlotte, North Carolina, reported on several traumatic experiences by its patients, including liberal uses of papoose boards and one child having 16 of his baby teeth capped in one sitting.

A May 9, 2004 story in The Colorado Springs Gazette revealed that the children underwent large amounts of dental work at the clinics. In a 14-month period until May 20, 2004, the clinics charged over $16 million in Medicaid dental charges, and records from the Colorado state government revealed that many children each had over 10 teeth drilled and given silver caps within a single visit. The State of Colorado Medicaid office placed a daily limit on stainless steel crowns to slow the payments. In April 2004, Michael DeRose said that the children at Small Smiles had severe dental needs. The Colorado State Dental Board also reported Edward DeRose, Michael DeRose, and Mueller to two national databases that serve as clearinghouses for information on actions filed against dentists. The DeRoses and Mueller filed a complaint asking the board to have their names removed.

47 Small Smiles dental clinics and other associated practices had opened in 16 states in a period of less than six years after the company began expanding throughout the U.S.

=== Post-DeRose ===
In 2006, the DeRose family sold its share of Small Smiles. In September and October 2006 the assets of Forba Dental Management a.k.a. FORBA, LLC were acquired from the DeRose family by a group of investors led by the Carlyle Group, Arcapita Bank, and American Capital Strategies. Sanus Holdings, LLC was created for purchasing FORBA, LLC's assets. Sanus Holdings later became Small Smiles Holding Company, LLC. The sales price was reported to be $435 million. A revolving line of credit was opened by CIT Group. and in September 2006, the operation relocated to Nashville, Tennessee.

After the ownership change in 2006, Small Smiles and its various clinics have pledged to be compliant with standards set in state and federal healthcare guidelines, as well as guidelines from the American Academy of Pediatric Dentistry. A Pediatric Dental Advisory Board was established in 2007 to assist Chief Dental Officer Stephen Adair in meeting quality of care standards.

In 2007, reporter Roberta Baskin of WJLA-TV in Washington, D.C., and her crew filmed the opening ceremony and operations at a newly opening Small Smiles clinic in Langley Park, Maryland. Her crew filmed video of screaming children, bound with papoose boards, as technicians performed dental work. She filmed the lead dentist discussing production goals and stating that his clinic's dentists perform many baby root canals per day. Interviews with several former employees who either resigned or were fired after speaking out against the company's practices revealed other abuses, including dental staff conducting X-rays on children even though they were not certified to do so. The film and the investigative report aired on television led to legal action unfolding. This sparked other stations across the United States to investigate area Small Smiles locations.

In April 2008, Michael A. DeRose and Letitia L. Ballance settled with the United States and North Carolina to resolve False Claims Act allegations that their Medicaid Dental Center (MDC), previously known as Smile Starters and Carolina Dental Center, made false or fraudulent Medicaid claims. MDC agreed to pay $10,050,000 and to not contest that their dentists performed unwarranted pulpotomies and placed stainless steel crowns.

A Kentucky woman named Debbie Hagan started a blog, "Dentist the Menace," which criticized the use of papoose boards at Small Smiles. Her blog included lists of documents, media accounts, other reports, and Hagan's research. Journalists used Hagan's blog to research the issue. Authorities from the State of New York contacted Hagan as part of their investigation of Small Smiles. On November 14, 2008, FORBA Holdings, LLC brought a lawsuit against Hagan, alleging copyright infringement. The suit was dismissed on April 16, 2009, at FORBA's request.

On September 28, 2009, a lawsuit was filed by FORBA Holdings, LLC against the company's former owners (LICSAC, LLC, DD Marketing, Inc., DeRose Management, LLC and LICSAC NY, LLC), citing breach of contract. On February 26, 2010, the case was dismissed with prejudice, with each party paying their own legal fees.

In January 2010, the US Justice Department settled False Claims Act allegations against FORBA Holdings, LLC. Under the settlement, FORBA will pay $24 million plus interest to the US and several states. The investigation was spurred by three qui tam lawsuits filed by former employees in Maryland, Virginia and South Carolina in late 2007 and early 2008. The US Justice Department found that FORBA was liable for:

... causing the submission of claims for reimbursement for a wide range of dental services provided to low-income children that were either medically unnecessary or performed in a manner that failed to meet professionally-recognized standards of care. These services included performing pulpotomies (baby root canals), placing crowns, administering anesthesia (including nitrous oxide), performing extractions, and providing fillings and/or sealants. ... In this case, FORBA put greed and profits before the well-being of children," said Timothy J. Heaphy, U.S. Attorney for the Western District of Virginia. "It endangered the health and safety of innocent children and defrauded the taxpayer of millions of dollars. Today's settlement addresses these egregious acts and sends a clear message that Medicaid fraud will be expeditiously addressed by this Department."

Under the agreement, FORBA entered into a corporate integrity agreement with the Office of the Inspector General of the Department of Health and Human Services. Investigations into individual dentists continue with the company's cooperation.

In response, company chairman and CEO Michael Lindley posted a statement on the firm's website stating "...We entered into the settlement to avoid the delay, uncertainty, inconvenience and expense of litigation, and did not admit any liability." Hagan said that she was glad that the settlement caused a financial loss for Small Smiles. She argued that this was not enough because the involved persons should also have received prison sentences and because the victims themselves needed financial compensation.

On January 25, 2010, just days after the settlement was announced, a class action suit was filed in the U.S. District Court for the Northern District of Ohio.

Currently operating under a corporate integrity agreement with the U.S. Department of Health and Human Services, Church Street's network of associated dental centers continues to serve low-income families, and recently began opening new clinics and featuring new services such as orthodontics and adult care.

In February 2012, the company filed for Chapter 11 Bankruptcy Protection.

As of December 2012, Small Smiles treated about 500,000 children each year. In December 2012 NBC News revealed it had investigated 63 Small Smiles clinics over a preceding three-year period and discovered continued accusations from former employees, parents, and government investigators that the clinics performed below standard and unnecessary procedures on children. Chuck Grassley, a member of the U.S. Senate, said that the company was scamming taxpayers and causing abuses to children in order to generate revenues. David Wilson, the CEO, said in a statement:

Patients are at the center of everything we do at CSHM. CSHM LLC supports our affiliated dental centers so that they can continue to provide access to quality dental care. Our dental centers serve approximately one million patient visits per year, primarily to children in communities with under-served access to dental care.

After Channel 4 Action News WTAE-TV began an investigation on Small Smiles, the U.S. Senate filed a report saying that taxpayer dollars were wasted in Small Smiles and recommended that its Medicaid access be terminated. The report accused Small Smiles clinics of performed unnecessary dental work and performing procedures too quickly. The 1,500-page report was prepared by Grassley and Max Baucus. This bipartisan report of the US Senate further advised Small Smiles Dental be excluded as a Medicaid provider. CSHM LLC stated that "We do not believe that this report adequately reflects the current operations of CSHM LLC (CSHM or the Company)."

In 2014, the Inspector General's Office announced that the management company Church Street Health Management will no longer be allowed to use Medicaid, Medicare, and other health programs of the federal government. CSHM, LLC filed for Chapter 7 bankruptcy on February 5, 2015.

== Governance ==
Members of FORBA's Pediatric Dental Advisory Board included Paul Casamassimo, Chair of the Department of Pediatric Dentistry at Ohio State University and Chief of Dentistry at Nationwide Children's Hospital; Joe Bernat, Chair of the Department of Pediatric and Community Dentistry at the State University of New York-Buffalo School of Dental Medicine; Arthur Nowak Professor Emeritus at the University of Iowa Colleges of Dentistry and Medicine; and Anupama Tate Director of Pediatric Dentistry at Children's National Medical Center in Washington, D.C.

== See also ==
- All Smiles Dental Centers
- Aspen Dental
- Kool Smiles
- ReachOut Healthcare America
