= Smile Starters =

Dental company

Smile Starters Dental, formerly Medicaid Dental Center (MDC), is a chain of dental clinics in North Carolina. As MDC, it operated under the names Smile Starters and Carolina Dental Center. Historically, its owners were Letitia L. "Tish" Ballance of Charlotte, North Carolina and Michael DeRose of Pueblo, Colorado. DeRose was also a partner in FORBA, the company that owns the Small Smiles Dental Centers. In 2008 the chain operated seven dental clinics.

== History ==
In 2003, WCNC-TV NewsChannel 36 I-Team aired a report showing children and parents alleging that MDC clinics had given unnecessary treatment. The news channel report stated that dentists at the chain were paid bonuses for the amount of dental work that was performed, and that the clinics of the chain separated children from parents and had performed unnecessary dental work. In 2005 the North Carolina State Board of Dental Examiners held a hearing on the chain's operations. That year, Ballance entered a consent order with the state dental board in which she agreed not to contest allegations from seven patients that she had performed excessive treatment. Ballance did not admit guilt.

As announced in an April 2008 release by the United States Department of Justice (USDOJ), MDC and its two owners reached a settlement with the USDOJ. The company paid back $5 million and added $5 million in fines. The chain did not admit to any wrongdoing. Ballance and DeRose were personally liable under the False Claims Act because they submitted claims for reimbursement that involved performing unnecessary pulpotomies (colloquially "baby root canals").

In 2008 one patient who had received fourteen pulpotomies in one sitting sued the chain. In 2010 the chain announced that it would pay back $24 million. By that year, one family suing the chain had settled its civil suit. On April 11, 2011, Ballance announced that her business, Carolina West Dental in Conover, North Carolina, would close on April 15. She left Catawba County. In addition, nine dentists received sanctions in relation to their work at Medicaid Dental Center clinics.

Rafael Rivera, Jr. said that he bought Smile Starters in 2008. The company changed its name to Smile Starters. In 2013 a mother of three children accused a Smile Starters clinic of fraudulently diagnosing cavities on her children. The television station WTVD aired a report about the accusation.

== See also ==
- Aspen Dental
- Kool Smiles
- ReachOut Healthcare America
