= Papoose on the Loose =

- Directed by: Paul J. Smith
- Written by: Homer Brightman
- Produced by: Walter Lantz
- Starring: Daws Butler
- Music by: Clarence Wheeler
- Production company: Walter Lantz Productions
- Distributed by: Universal Pictures
- Release date: April 11, 1961
- Running time: 6 minutes
- Country: United States
- Language: English

Papoose on the Loose is a 1961 American animated short film produced by Walter Lantz.

It was created as part of the Cartune Theatrical Cartoon Series.

== Story ==
The film depicts a father-son duo of Native Americans. The Papoose is bent on hunting. His father, the chief, tells him not to. Papoose does not listen, so the chief dresses himself in a bear suit to scare him out of the idea.
