= Shasta Regional Medical Center =

- Prime Healthcare Services

Geography
- Location: Redding, California, United States
- Coordinates: 40°35′08″N 122°23′16″W

Services
- Emergency department: basic
- Beds: 226

Helipads
- Helipad: (IATA: 11CN)
Number	Length		Surface
Number	ft	m	Surface
H1	37 x 37	11 x 11	concrete
H2	54 x 54	16 x 16	concrete

History
- Former names: Memorial Hospital, Redding Medical Center, Shasta Medical Center
- Opened: 1945

Links
- Website: shastaregional.com
- Lists: Hospitals in California

Shasta Regional Medical Center, formerly known as Redding Medical Center and Memorial Hospital, is a general acute care hospital that is located in Redding, California. It opened in 1945 and currently has 226 beds with a basic emergency department.

== History ==
The hospital was founded by Dr. Thomas Wyatt, M.D., in 1945 as Memorial Hospital.

It was purchased by Tenet Healthcare Corporation in 1976 and renamed Redding Medical Center.

In 2008, it was sold to Hospital Partners of America and renamed Shasta Regional Medical Center.

== Legal issues ==
In 2002, amid a federal investigation of two cardiologists at the hospital, Drs. Chae Hyun Moon and Fidel Realyvasquez, and as part of a settlement with federal regulators, Tenet Healthcare Corporation was compelled to sell the hospital to Hospital Partners of America for US$60 million in 2004.

=== Unnecessary care and billing ===
At Redding Medical Center, the early-2000s investigation, raid and litigation were prompted because "physicians undertook large volumes of inappropriate and unnecessary procedures on largely healthy patients". The investigation into Moon and Realyvasquez was the result of multiple whistleblower lawsuits filed under the Federal False Claims Act alleging unnecessary medical procedures. Catholic Priest John Corapi, Joseph Zerga and Redding physician Patrick Campbell split 15% of the total $62.55 million settlement.

Tenet had already agreed to pay $54 million in 2003 to settle the federal case without admitting any wrongdoing but with an agreement for new oversight procedures for physicians and staff. In 2004, Tenet established a $395 million fund for 769 cardiac patients to settle civil suits relating to procedures performed by Moon and Realyvasquez.

There was evidence that Prime Healthcare Services engaged in upcoding elderly patients to malnutrition. At Shasta Regional Medical Center, Prime reported 16.1% of their Medicare patients suffered from kwashiorkor. The state of California average for Medicare patients is 0.2% suffering from kwashiorkor. Prime Healthcare Services was investigated for Medicare fraud by United States Department of Health and Human Services and the California Department of Justice.

In 2013, SRMC agreed to a settlement regarding claims of HIPAA violations when 2 senior leaders met with a reporter to discuss medical services provided to a patient.

In 2021, Prime Healthcare & 2 doctors agreed to pay $37.5 Million to settle allegations of violations of the California False Claims Act.
