= ReachOut Healthcare America =

Dental services company

ReachOut Healthcare America (RHA) is a dental management services company with its headquarters in Farmington Hills, Michigan. It is a part of the private equity portfolio of Morgan Stanley. The company operates in 22 U.S. states. In 2011, the company coordinated dental care at 8,700 schools and coordinated the processing of 488,000 children in those schools. As of May 2012, the company has coordinated the processing of 1.5 million patients. ReachOut seeks to coordinate treatment for underserved children on Medicaid.

The company has a mobile dentistry coordination program for children in U.S. schools, and it provides the coordination of services under the name "Big Smiles." It also offers a coordination program for U.S. soldiers. The company previously had a coordination program for senior and disabled residents of nursing homes. In December 2011 the company divested its nursing home program.

Chris Alltucker of The Arizona Republic said that critics argued that the Big Smiles' business model is designed to collect as much money from Medicaid as possible on behalf of dentists performing numerous, and sometimes unnecessary procedures. ReachOut Healthcare America of Phoenix says it performs a valuable service, providing access to dental care for underserved children. The company also stated that it does not employ any dentists, or make patient care decisions for the mobile dentists that visit the schools.

== History ==
Michael Howell and Daniel Goldsmith, the founders, established ReachOut in 1997 as a company that coordinated dental services to nursing home patients in Michigan. The company began coordinating services to schools. The company had also coordinated services to foster programs, group homes, homeless shelters, and mental health facilities by late 2003.

In 2005 the company began coordinating services to five school districts in St. Louis County, Missouri.

Sentinel Capital Partners provided the company with private equity funding in November 2007. ReachOut increased its patient base by 500% and acquired two rival companies. The company later became a holding of Morgan Stanley Private Equities.

In October 2011, a Camp Verde, Arizona boy treated by a dentist affiliated with ReachOut complained of pain. His mother, Stacey Gagnon, accused the dentist of performing dental procedures on the boy without the parents' permission. Darren and Stacey Gagnon, the parents of the boy, filed a lawsuit against the individual dentist and the ReachOut company. In November 2011, Dan Brown, then the superintendent of the Camp Verde Unified School District, signed a "cease and desist" letter preventing ReachOut from operating in the school district facilities.

The company previously had a partnership with the Clark County School District, the largest school district in the state of Nevada. In December 2011, the district ended its partnership with ReachOut. Ken Alltucker of the Arizona Republic said that several parents complained that ReachOut had performed significant dental procedures such as fillings and crowns without properly notifying the parents, but that "the driving force behind the decision was concern that students did not get proper emergency or after-hours care because ReachOut dentists visited just twice a year." Amanda Fulkerson, a district spokesperson, said that many children treated by ReachOut had suffered from pain after the procedures, and many school nurses complained about the scenarios. Fulkerson said "[t]hey (ReachOut) were going well beyond what we consider preventive care. It was our (school administration's) belief you should be in a proper dental setting, and the board agreed. We terminated the contract." In response, a mobile dentist who worked with ReachOut, Derryl Brian, said that the dentists under ReachOut had, since 2006, treated 80,000 children, and that there was a high rate of satisfaction.

Several school districts in Arizona, as of August 2012, have continued to use ReachOut. ReachOut provided care for over 2,000 students of the Peoria Unified School District in Greater Phoenix. ReachOut serviced twenty Peoria USD schools that have high percentages of low income students. The ReachOut website includes testimonials from a school nurse in Tucson, Arizona and an elementary school principal of the Deer Valley Unified School District in Greater Phoenix.

In the two years until August 2012, the Arizona Health Care Cost Containment System (AHCCCS) paid ReachOut's affiliated dental practice $12.5 million. The CEO of ReachOut Healthcare America, Chris Bird, said that during that time period, in Arizona the in-school dentists under Dr. Ralph Green treated over 100,000 children, with an average of 15 children per day per school visit. Bird said that the majority of the services included preventative dentistry, including examinations, cleanings, sealants, and fluoride treatment; and fillings. Bird said that only 1.3% of the procedures in the dental practices associated with ReachOut involve crowns and root canals.

In July 2013 Chuck Grassley and Max Baucus of the U.S. Senate released a report on corporate dental care; it discusses allegations against ReachOut Healthcare America and states that "those practices were not necessarily widespread." It concluded that "The reported problems of unnecessary procedures, lack of parental consent and patient abuse appear to be the result of ReachOut having management agreements with several unscrupulous dentists. Given the administrative nature of their arrangement, ReachOut lacks ability to police such bad actors." It also stated that Reachout "had no standards for dentists with whom they contract to obtain parental consent for treatment."

== See also ==
- All Smiles Dental Centers
- Aspen Dental
- Kool Smiles
- Small Smiles Dental Centers
- Smile Starters
- Pediatric dentistry
