= Texas State Board of Dental Examiners =

American state agency of Texas

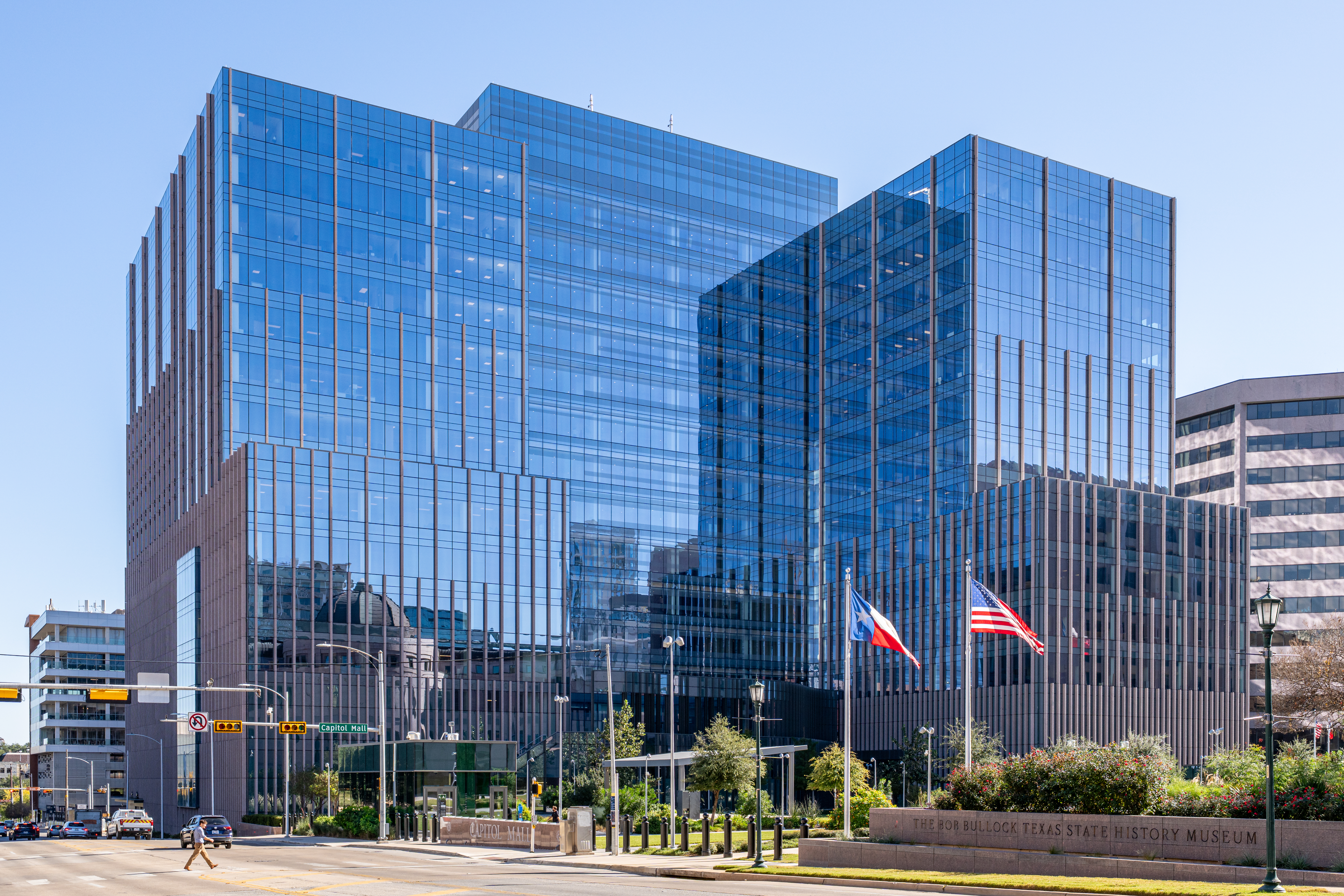
It is headquartered in the George H.W. Bush State Office Building

The Texas State Board of Dental Examiners (SBDE) is a state agency of Texas. It has its headquarters in Suite 8.600 at 1801 Congress Avenue in the George H. W. Bush State Office Building in Downtown Austin, Texas. The board regulates dentists, dental hygienists, dental assistants and dental labs in the state. The agency includes an executive, finance, and personnel division, a licensing division, an enforcement division, and a legal division. The dental board itself has 12 board members.
