= Papoose board =

Temporary medical stabilization board

In the medical field a papoose board is a temporary medical stabilization board used to limit a patient's freedom of movement to decrease risk of injury while allowing safe completion of treatment. The term papoose board refers to a brand name.

It is most commonly used during dental work, venipuncture, and other medical procedures. It is also sometimes used during medical emergencies to keep an individual from moving when total sedation is not possible. It is usually used on patients as a means of temporarily and safely limiting movement and is generally more effective than holding the person down. It is mostly used on young patients and patients with special needs.

A papoose board is a cushioned board with fabric Velcro straps that can be used to help limit a patient's movement and hold them steady during the medical procedure. Sometimes oral, IV or gas sedation such as nitrous oxide will be used to calm the patient prior to or during use. Using a papoose board to temporarily and safely limit movement is often preferable to medical sedation, which presents serious potential risks, including death. As a result, restraint is preferred by some parents as an alternative to sedation, behavior management/anxiety reduction techniques, better pain management or a low-risk anxiolytic such as nitrous oxide. Informed consent from a parent or guardian is usually required before a papoose board can be used. If assent from the child is required, then in most cases, the papoose board would be prohibited as it is unlikely that a child would agree to restraint and not struggle. In some countries, the papoose board is banned and considered a serious breach of ethics (for example, the U.K.).

== Use of papoose boards in dentistry ==
The American Academy of Pediatric Dentistry approves of partial or complete stabilization of the patient in cases when it is necessary to protect the patient, practitioner, staff, or parent from injury while providing dental care. As of 2004, 85 percent of dental programs across the U.S. teach protective stabilization as an acceptable behavioral management practice. By 2004 The Colorado Springs Gazette reported that the dental chain Small Smiles Dental Centers used papoose boards almost 7,000 times in one period of 18 months, according to Colorado state records. Michael and Edward DeRose, two of the owners of Small Smiles, said that they used papoose boards so that they could do dental work on larger numbers of children in a more rapid manner. Small Smiles dentists from other states learned the papoose board method in Colorado and began practicing the method in other states. As a result, a Colorado Board of Dental Examiners-appointed committee established a new Colorado state law forbidding the usage of papoose boards for children unless a dentist has exhausted other possibilities for controlling a child's behavior, and if the dentist uses a papoose board, he or she must document why the papoose board was used in the patient's record.

== Controversies ==
In some countries, the papoose board is banned and considered a serious breach of ethical practice. Although the papoose board is discussed as a behavior management technique, it is simply a restraint technique although ethically questionable, thus preventing any behavior from occurring that could be managed with recognized behavioral and anxiety reduction techniques.

== Origins ==
Papoose boards were originally a wood-and-leather device used by many Native American tribes to swaddle their infants and children. Papoose boards, also known as cradle boards, are still in use in many places.
