= Dental service organizations =

U.S. businesses that contract with dental practices

Dental service organizations, abbreviated to DSOs within the dental industry, are independent business support centers that contract with dental practices in the United States. They provide business management and support to dental practices, including non-clinical operations.

Following the passage of the Affordable Care Act and the subsequent expansion of Medicaid, the DSO model has become increasingly popular for dental practices. As of 2023 the DSO market size was valued at 139.3 billion, and is expected to grow at a rate of 17.6% yearly from 2024 through 2030. In certain parts of the United States, dental practices have begun to transition from a traditional practice to a DSO model in order to provide more affordable care to a larger patient population. Dentistry innovations have meant that DSOs have become a common dental care solution to many low-income families in the United States. The grouping of dental practices has allowed DSOs to minimize their costs, allowing practices to pass the saving on to patients currently without adequate dental care.

== History ==
A Gallup survey in 2001 polled the effectiveness of medical care for low-income patients in the United States. The survey found that 19 percent of respondents had not received the medical treatment they required due to the affordability of the treatment. Over a period of eight years, the percentage continued to rise, reaching 29 percent in 2009. Passage of the Affordable Care Act (ACA) was intended, in part, to combat the growing number of people not receiving medical or dental care, due to the unaffordable cost. Yet the unaffordable care statistic continued to rise. In 2014, the statistic reached 33 percent, before falling a year later to 31 percent.

New Mexico Health Resources produced a report in 2008, showing the impact and drawbacks of general dental care in the United States. It stated that many of the figures used to measure dental care could be inaccurate without diagnostic codes. The report summarized at the time there were widespread unexplained variations in clinical decisions among dentists. Other reports published around the same time, stated there was "conflicting definitions of quality and quality-related activities." Industry and legal experts have stated that dental professionals are bound by legal and professional standards, no matter which dental model they choose to participate in.

A 2015 National Minority Quality Forum report stated that dental support organizations (DSOs) are one innovation that is helping to address the accessibility problem in dental care. The same report found that 47 percent of Americans had limited or poor access to quality healthcare.

Growing demand among low-income populations increases the needs for DSOs to curb the poor dental care issue in the United States. DSOs have been credited for much of the improved access to dentistry for Medicaid-eligible children in the last decade. The National Institute of Dental and Craniofacial Research carried out further research into dental care for minorities and found that black and Hispanic families in lower-income areas had much higher incidences of tooth decay. Similar research shows that poor dental hygiene directly affects educational abilities and school attendance.

There has been a steady increase in the number of dentists in the United States that have opted to contract with a DSO since 2017. The number of practices using the DSO model is growing at nearly three times the rate of the industry itself. Towards the end of 2015 and into 2016, more studies were carried out on the efficiencies of DSOs. The dental company Kool Smiles operates as a DSO and was found to have per-patient Medicaid expenditures that were 33 percent lower than non-DSO patients.

Several state dental associations have attempted to introduce legislation to restrict DSOs from competing within their state. Associations claim that the DSO may exert pressure on dentists to do more work than what is needed, despite studies that show DSO-affiliated dentists actually do less work than the average dentist. The FTC has commented that this type of legislation would harm consumers. Groups such as Americans for Tax Reform and the National Taxpayers Union have opposed this legislation.

DSOs distinguish themselves from dental group practices when the support services provided by the DSO to dental offices such as billing, IT, marketing, human resources, payroll and accounting are part of a separate, legally independent company, as required by many states.

An invisible DSO is a dental support organization that remains anonymous after it affiliates with the dentist. It is defined as a DSO which owns all or part of multiple practices, usually built through acquisitions, which retain the doctor's original branding. The practices owned by these DSOs have a local brand, but benefit from large scale and professional management.

== See also ==
- List of dental organizations
- List of dental organizations in the United States
- Dental Professionals Association
- Women in DSO
