= Stephen Klaidman =

American author (born 1938)

Stephen Klaidman (born 1938) is an American author.

== Biography ==
Klaidman was also a former editor and reporter for The New York Times, The Washington Post, and the International Herald Tribune. He was a senior research fellow at the Kennedy Institute of Ethics and a senior research associate at the Institute for Health Policy Analysis, Georgetown University. He currently lives in Bethesda, Maryland.

== Books ==
- Sydney and Violet: Their Life with T.S. Eliot, Proust, Joyce, and the Excruciatingly Irascible Wyndham Lewis (Nan A. Talese/Doubleday, 2013) The book was selected by Denis Donoghue as a Book of the Year in the Irish Times.
- Coronary: A True Story of Medicine Gone Awry. Scribner. 2008-06-03. ISBN 0-7432-6755-9.
- Saving the Heart: The Battle to Conquer Coronary Disease. Oxford University Press, USA. 2000-01-15. ISBN 978-0-19-511279-5.
- The Virtuous Journalist. Oxford University Press, USA. 1988-07-07. ISBN 978-0-19-505688-4.
- Health in the Headlines: The Stories Behind the Stories. Oxford University Press, USA. 1991-09-12. ISBN 978-0-19-505298-5.
