= Corporate integrity agreement =

A corporate integrity agreement (CIA) is a document outlining the obligations that a company involved in health care in the United States makes with a federal government agency or a state government as part of a civil settlement. On the federal level the Office of Inspector General of the Department of Health and Human Services and the Department of Justice are usually involved, and on the state level, the state attorney general and the state offices involved in Medicaid or Medicare are involved.

CIA can be used to address quality of care or corporate integrity issues.

CIAs create a framework within which the company must operate in order to avoid being barred from participation in federal health care programs. States use CIAs as part of their anti-fraud efforts.

CIAs generally last 5 years. During this time the provider is usually required to implement or expand a comprehensive employee training program, a confidential disclosure program, written standards and policies, and designate a compliance officer and committee if these things are not already done. CIAs also mandate establishing processes for managing and reporting “reportable events.” Reportable events include overpayments, ongoing investigations or legal proceedings, potential violation of criminal, civil, or administrative laws applicable to any Federal health care program for which penalties or exclusion may be authorized, and employing or contracting with an ineligible person.

Some CIAs require an independent organization to review and monitor compliance with the terms and conditions of the CIA. Most CIAs require claims reviews to identify errors and their underlying causes. The government agency may check compliance through site visits. If a company breaks the agreement, the agency can fine them and if issues cannot be resolved the provider may be barred.
