= Women in dentistry =

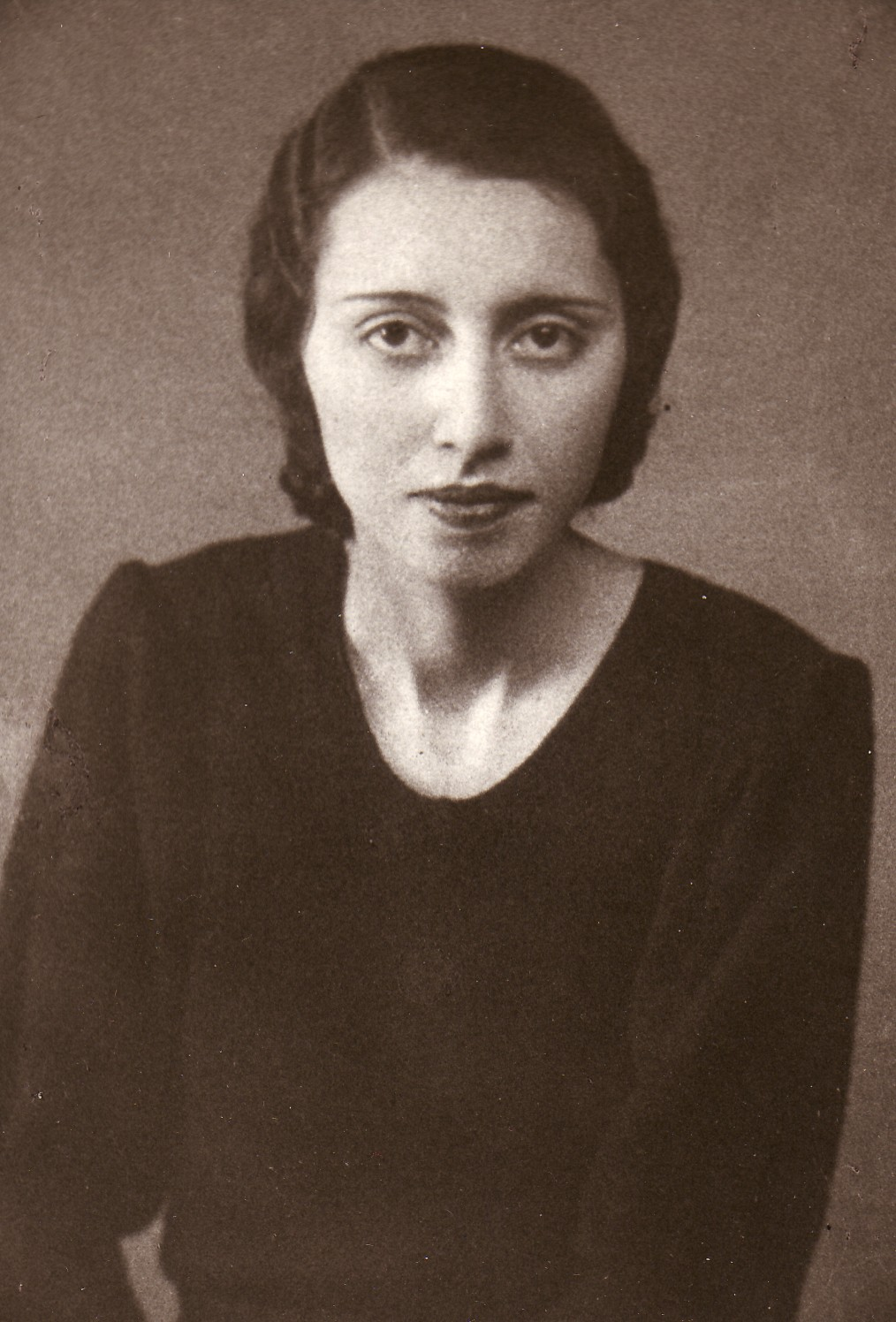
Badri Teymourtash, the first female dentist in Iran

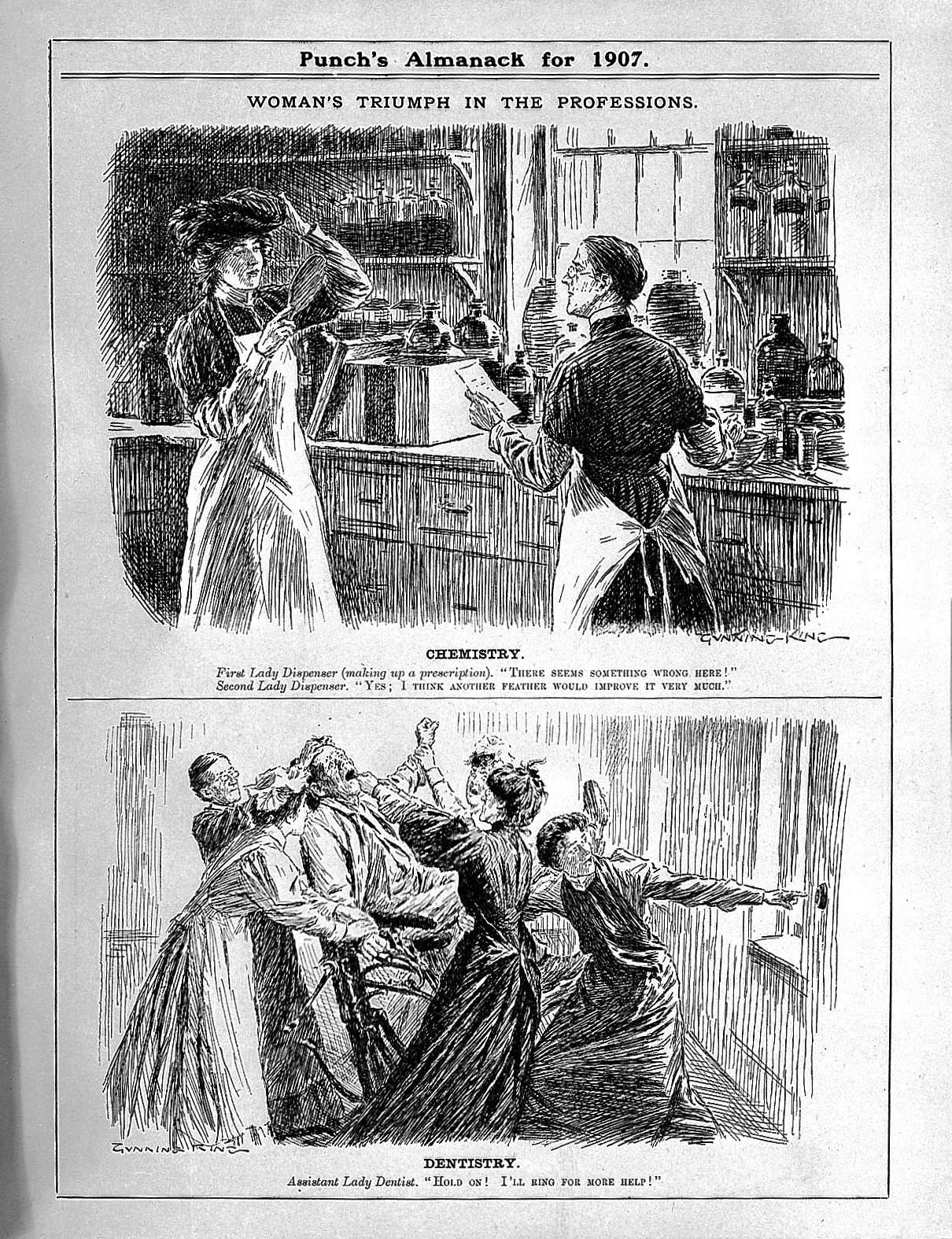
Cartoon of assistant Lady-Dentist from Punch. This shows prejudice against women in the dental profession.

There is a long history of women in dentistry. Women are depicted as assistant dentists in the Middle Ages. Prior to the 19th century, dentistry was largely not yet a clearly defined and regulated profession with formal educational requirements. Individual female dentists are known from the 18th century. When the profession was regulated in the 19th century, it took a while before women achieved the formal education and permission to engage in dentistry.

== Timeline ==
=== 16th century ===
- 16th century: In a 1523 copper engraving by Lucas Van Leyden, an itinerant tooth drawer can be seen, with a woman standing behind the patient. While some interpreted the woman as a dental assistant, the person behind the patient is picking his pocket.

=== 18th century ===
In the 18th century dentistry was not yet a regulated and clearly defined profession, and could be performed by people of all professions, such as barbers and beauticians. The informality of the profession, where no formal education (unavailable to women) was not yet required, meant that women dentists did exist during the 18th century.

- Early 18th century: A Mademoiselle De Reze published in 1719 a short treatise on elixirs for toothache entitled Dissertation Apologetique. This was a few years before "Le Chirugien Dentiste" by Pierre Fauchard in 1728.
- 1740: Madeleine-Françoise Calais became the first female dentist to obtain a license as a master dentist from the Surgical Society of Paris.
- 1755: A new law in France banned women from practicing any medical profession except midwifery.
- 1775: Hannah Crippen her services as a dentist and phlebotomist, continuing the business of her late husband, at Baldwins Gardens, Gray's Inn, London.
- 1777: A Mrs Levis or Lewis and her husband, advertised their services as dentists at Marylebone Street, Golden Square; Mrs Levis attended the women and Mr Levis, the men.
- 1777: A Mrs De St Raymond advertised her services as a dentist, from her home, No. 9, Kings-square Court, Soho, to the nobility and gentry.
- 1777: La Signora Foggioni of Genova advertises herself as a dentiste at No. 5, New George Street, Blackfriars Bridge, London.
- 1782: Maria Briwolski of Dresden was granted permission from the authorities to practice dentistry in Sweden.
- 1791: Catherine Madden of 53, St John's Street, West Smithfield, London, advertises her services as a dentist.
- 1792: A Mrs Hunter, a beautician, advertised her services as a dentist from her home, No 78 Great Titchfield Street.

=== 19th century ===
In the 19th century dentistry gradually became a regulated and clearly defined profession, and formal education come to be required to practice it. This initially excluded women from dentistry; however formal education gradually became available to women in the 19th-century, resulting in the first formally educated female dentists.

- 1814: Josephine Serre became the first woman to receive a dentistry degree from the University of Tartu.
- c. 1814–1830: A Madame Ana made a successful career as a "dentist for women" in a clinic on the Rue Rivoli in Paris, being the dentist of the royal Marie-Thérèse, Duchess of Angoulême.
- 1849: Polonia Sanz y Ferrer became the first female dentist in Spain.
- 1852: Amalia Assur became the first female dentist in Sweden; she was given special permission from the Royal Board of Health (Kongl. Sundhetskollegiets) to practice independently as a dentist, despite the fact that the profession was not legally opened to women in Sweden before 1861.
- 1855: Emeline Roberts Jones became the first woman to practice dentistry in the United States.
- 1866: Rosalie Fougelberg received a royal dispensation from Swedish King Charles XV and thus became the first woman in Sweden to officially practice dentistry since the profession had been legally opened to women in Sweden in 1861.
- 1866: Lucy Hobbs Taylor became the first woman to graduate from a dental college (Ohio Dental College).
- 1869: Henriette Hirschfeld-Tiburtius, born in Germany, became the first woman to take a full college course in dentistry, as Lucy Hobbs Taylor received credit for her time in dental practice before attending dental college. Henriette graduated from the Pennsylvania College of Dental Surgery in 1869.
- 1872: Petra Lie became the first female dentist in Norway.
- 1872, March 4: Helen Vongl de Swiderska graduated as an advanced standing student from New York College of Dentistry, New York (Today NYU College of Dentistry). Originally from St. Petersburg, Russia, she spent one year in the program to obtain her D.D.S. degree. She returned to Europe after graduation.
- 1874: Fanny A. Rambarger became the second American woman to earn the degree of Doctor of Dental Surgery in 1874, when she graduated from the Pennsylvania College of Dental Surgery. She worked in Philadelphia and limited her practice to women and children only.
- 1881: Margaret Caro became the first woman to be listed on the Dentists' Register of New Zealand.
- 1886: Margarita Chorné y Salazar became the first female dentist in Mexico.
- 1887: Hedvig Eleonora Ståhlberg became the first female dentist in Finland.
- 1888: Nicoline Møller became the first female dentist in Denmark.
- 1890: Ida Rollins became the first African-American woman to earn a dental degree in the United States, which she earned from the University of Michigan.
- 1892: The Women's Dental Association of the U.S. was founded in 1892 by Mary Stillwell-Kuesel with 12 charter members.
- 1893: Caroline Louise Josephine Wells became the first woman to graduate from the Royal College of Dental Surgeons of Ontario, which made her the first Canadian woman to graduate from any dental school.
- 1895: Lilian Lindsay became the first licensed female dentist in Britain.
- 1895: Anna Robina (Robbi) Karvonen became the first female dentist to study and earn a dental degree in Finland, when she took her exam in 1895.
- 1898: Emma Gaudreau Casgrain became the first licensed female dentist in Canada.

=== 20th century ===
- 1904–1905: Faith Sai So Leong, also called Sai So Yeong, became the first Chinese-American woman to graduate from a school of dentistry and become a dentist in the United States. In 1904 she became the first woman of any race to graduate from the College of Physicians and Surgeons (now the University of the Pacific Arthur A. Dugoni School of Dentistry). In 1905 she was awarded the Doctor of Dental Surgery from that school, and after a trial of the State Board of Dental Examiners, which delayed the awarding of licenses, she was granted a dental license in August 1905.
- 1907: Frances Dorothy Gray became Australia's first female Bachelor of Dental Science graduate; she graduated from the Australian College of Dentistry, University of Melbourne, in 1907.
- 1907: Mathilde Athenas was the first female dentist to graduate in Réunion.
- 1909: Minnie Evangeline Jordon established the first dental practice in the United States devoted only to pediatric patients.
- 1916: Gillette Hayden served as the first female president of the American Academy of Periodontology.
- 1920: Maude Tanner became the first recorded female delegate to the American Dental Association.
- 1921: During the annual meeting of the American Dental Association (ADA), 12 female dentists met in Milwaukee and formed the Federation of American Women Dentists, now known as the American Association of Women Dentists (AAWD). Their first president was Minnie Evangeline Jordon.
- 1923: Anita Martin became the first woman inducted into the American dental honor society Omicron Kappa Upsilon.
- 1925: Minnie Evangeline Jordon published the first textbook on pedodontics, titled Operative Dentistry for Children.
- 1931: Maria Schug-Kösters became the first female dentist in Germany to have a teaching license (known as venia legendi) for dentistry.
- 1944: Vimla Sood became the first woman to be a dentist in undivided India, upon graduating from the De'Montmorency College of Dentistry in 1944.
- 1946: Lilian Lindsay became the first female president of the British Dental Association.
- 1951: Helen E. Myers, a 1941 graduate of Temple University, was commissioned as the U.S. Army Dental Corps' first female dental officer in 1951.
- 1953: Raya Rachlin became the first woman commissioned as a United States Air Force dentist.
- 1957: Simi Johnson and Grace Guobadia both qualified as dentists in 1957, making them the first trained female dentists in Nigeria.
- 1959: Fatima Nazzal became the first female dentist in Palestine upon settling in Ramallah.
- 1961: Luz C. Macapanpan was elected as the first female president of the Philippine Dental Association.
- 1961: Etelvina González Martínez was the first woman to graduate from the School of Medicine of the Medical Sciences Campus of the University of Puerto Rico.
- 1964: Jeanne Sinkford became the first female prosthodontist with a PhD degree; her degree was in Physiology, and from Northwestern University.
- 1965: Badri Teymourtash and Esmael Sondoozi founded Mashhad University's School of Dentistry.
- 1967: Jiko Luveni became the first Fijian woman to graduate from the Fiji School of Dentistry.
- 1975: On July 1, 1975, Jeanne Sinkford became the first female dean of an American dental school when she was appointed the dean of Howard University, School of Dentistry.
- 1974: Patricia Smathers Moulton became the first woman certified by the American Board of Prosthodontics.
- 1975: Jessica Rickert became the first female American Indian dentist in America upon graduating from the University of Michigan School of Dentistry in 1975. She was a member of the Prairie Band Potawatomi Nation, and a direct descendant of the Indian chief Wahbememe (Whitepigeon).
- 1977: The American Association of Dental Schools (founded in 1923 and renamed the American Dental Education Association in 2000) had Nancy Goorey as its first female president in 1977.
- 1988: The American Student Dental Association elected its first female president, N. Gail McLaurin of the Medical University of South Carolina.
- 1991: Geraldine Morrow became the first female president of the American Dental Association.
- 1994: Jane D. Brewer became the first female fellow in the Academy of Prosthodontics.
- 1995: Anna-Lena Hallonsten became the first female president of the International Association of Paediatric Dentistry.
- 1997: Hazel J. Harper became the first female president of the [American] National Dental Association.

=== 21st century ===
- 2001: Marjorie Jeffcoat became the first female editor of The Journal of the American Dental Association.
- 2003: Nancy S. Arbree became the first female president of the American College of Prosthodontists.
- 2003: Rear Admiral Carol I. Turner became the first female Chief of the U.S. Navy Dental Corps.
- 2003: Rhonda Jacob became the first female American Board of Prosthodontics examiner.
- 2004: Sandra Madison, of Asheville, North Carolina, was elected as the first female president of the American Association of Endodontists.
- 2004: Nikki Rubaine-Connell became the first local female dentist to practice dentistry in the British Virgin Islands after having studied abroad.
- 2004: Janet Hatcher Rice became the first female president of the Academy of Laser Dentistry.
- 2005: Michele Aerden became the first female president of the FDI World Dental Federation.
- 2006: Jane D. Brewer became the first female president of the American Academy of Fixed Prosthodontics.
- 2006: Rhonda Jacob became the first female president of the American Academy of Maxillofacial Prosthetics.
- 2007: Laura Kelly became the first female president of the American Academy of Cosmetic Dentistry.
- 2008: Rhonda Jacob became the first female president of the Academy of Prosthodontics.
- 2008: Beverly Largent, a pediatric dentist from Paducah, Kentucky, became the first female president of the American Academy of Pediatric Dentistry.
- 2008: Valerie Murrah became the first female president of the American Academy of Oral and Maxillofacial Pathology.
- 2008: Paula Jones became the first female president of the Academy of General Dentistry.
- 2008: Deborah Stymiest of Fredericton was elected as the first female president of the Canadian Dental Association.
- 2008: Susan Bordenave-Bishop became the first female president of the Academy of Dentistry International.
- 2009: Kathleen T. O'Loughlin, of Medford, Massachusetts, became the first female executive director of the American Dental Association.
- 2010: Rhonda Jacob became the first female president of the American Board of Prosthodontics.
- 2011: Angella Tahani, the first qualified dentist from Solomon Islands, Tikopia, began serving as a Chief Dental Officer.
- 2011: Ruth Bol, a Comanche woman, became the first female president of the Society of American Indian Dentists.
- 2013: Gayle Glenn was elected as the first female president of the American Association of Orthodontists.

== See also ==
- Dental service organizations
- List of first female dentists by country
- Women in dentistry in the United States
