= List of dentists =

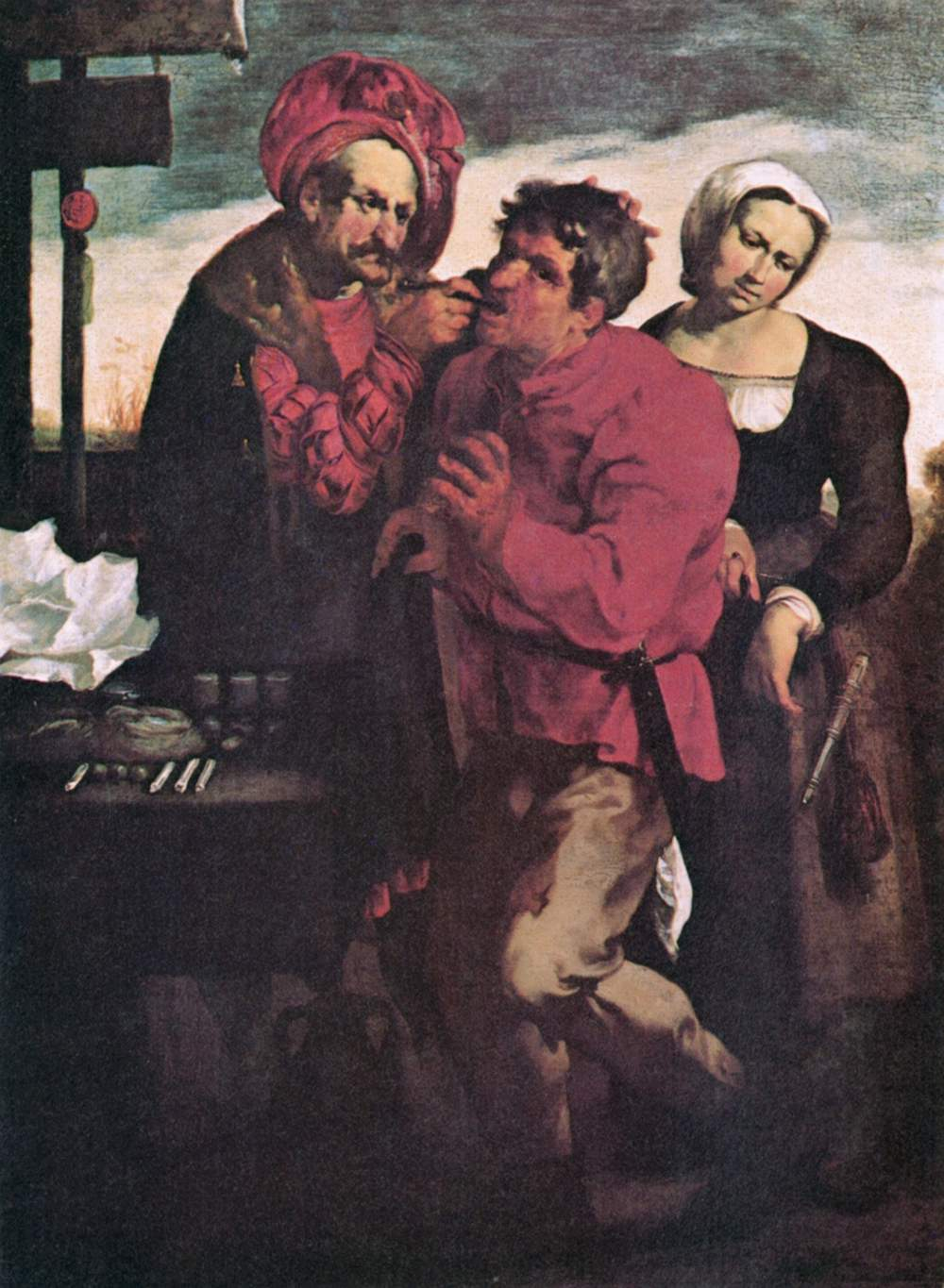
Farmer at the dentist, Johann Liss, c. 1616–17

This is a list of dentists who have gained a degree of notability, particularly with regard to the history of those in the field.

== Real-life dentists ==
=== A ===
- Sam Aanestad – former Californian politician
- Michele Aerden - the first female president of the FDI World Dental Federation
- Harold Albrecht – Conservative Party of Canada politician
- Tomas Albrektsson – implant dentistry
- Henry Aldridge – politician from North Carolina
- Bill Allen – former president of the British Dental Association.
- Theodore C. Almquist – Brigadier General, US Air Force
- Edward Angle – father of orthodontics
- Arif Alvi – President of Pakistan
- Steve Arlin – became a dentist after playing Major League Baseball
- Gunadasa Amarasekara – Sinhala language writer
- Amalia Assur (1803–1889) first woman dentist in Sweden and possibly Europe.
- Rafiuddin Ahmed (dentist) – Indian dentist. founded the First Dental College of India
- Ana Bedran-Russo (Brazilian) Professor of Restorative Dentistry and Chair of the Department of General Dental Sciences in Restorative Dentistry at Marquette University School of Dentistry
[top]

=== B ===
- Franz Bäke – Nazi Panzer ace
- Britt Baker – American professional wrestler currently performing with All Elite Wrestling; also has a full-time dental practice in Florida
- Charles Spence Bate – authority on crustaceans, five species are named for him
- William George Beers – established the Montreal Lacrosse Club and the Canada Journal of Dental Science
- Samuel Bemis – photography pioneer who became an eccentric recluse
- Hedvig Bensow - the first female dentist in Finland
- Gurbanguly Berdimuhamedow – President of Turkmenistan
- André Bolhuis – Netherlands Field Hockey Player
- Daniel Bukantz – American fencer
- Paul Beresford – Conservative Party (UK) politician
- David Bernier – Secretary of State of Puerto Rico
- Greene Vardiman Black – invented a foot-driven dental drill and is classed as a father of modern dentistry
- Robert Blake – wrote, An Essay on the Structure and Formation of the Teeth in Man and Various Animals.
- Jan Boubli – French professional poker player and retired dentist
- Allan G. Brodie – American dentist who established the Prize Essay Award to promote research
- Edgar Buchanan – primarily known for his later career as an actor in shows like Petticoat Junction
- Robert Bunon (1702–1748), French dentist in enamel hypoplasia research.
- Julius Bruck – also designed a water-cooled diaphanoscopic instrument for translumination of the bladder via the rectum
- Martin van Butchell – Eccentric who put his wife's head on display at his home/practice after her death
- Donald J. Butz – U.S. Air Force Major General
[top]

=== C ===
- Madeleine-Françoise Calais - the first female dentist to obtain a license as a master dentist from the Surgical Society of Paris
- Héctor José Cámpora – President of Argentina
- Billy Cannon – American football player and counterfeiter
- Georg Carabelli – court dentist to the Austrian Emperor who founded a clinic in the University of Vienna
- Gerald Cardinale – Republican Party (United States) politician with a dental office in Fort Lee, New Jersey
- James Carlisle – Governor-General of Antigua and Barbuda and member of the British Dental Association
- Margaret Caro - the first woman to be listed on the Dentists' Register of New Zealand
- Emma Gaudreau Casgrain - the first licensed female dentist in Canada
- Henri-Edmond Casgrain - Canadian dental surgeon, inventor, city councillor and the first motorist in Quebec.
- Allen M. Christensen – American politician, Utah state senator
- Steve Christian – one of the Pitcairn Island sex abusers who did dentistry and was Mayor
- Dipak Chudasama – cricketer called "The Doc" because he's a qualified dentist
- Antoni Cieszyński – Polish head of a Stomatology Institute who was killed in the Massacre of Lwów professors
- Bernard J. Cigrand – possibly the "Father of Flag Day"
- Barney Clark – first recipient of the Jarvik 7 artificial heart
- Henry D. Cogswell – designed a method of securing dental plates, and in the temperance movement
- Frederick J. Conboy – secretary of the Ontario Dental Association and later mayor of Toronto
- Thomas Connelly – American dentist, works on teeth of celebrities
- Pierre Corbeil – Canadian politician, Quebec cabinet minister
- Dan Crane – American dentist/politician. Republican Party
- L. Adele Cuinet - pioneer American dental surgeon
- Gerry Curatola
[top]

=== D ===
- Miles Dewey Davis, Jr. – ran for a seat on the State Legislature, NAACP member, and father to Miles Davis
- Bessie Delany – second black woman to be granted a dentistry license in New York state
- G. Walter Dittmar – former president of the American Dental Association
- Robert Dudley – actor
- Winfield Dunn – governor of Tennessee
[top]

=== E ===
- Bill Emmerson – California State Assembly member who had a 22-year practice
- Thomas W. Evans – founded the University of Pennsylvania School of Dental Medicine
[top]

=== F ===
- Sheila Faith – British politician of the Conservative party
- Pierre Fauchard – wrote the first complete scientific description of dentistry
- Polonia Sanz y Ferrer - the first female dentist in Spain
- Rabab Fetieh – first Saudi female orthodontist
- Charles Finnigan (1901–1967) – Surgeon Rear Admiral in the Royal Navy who was Honorary Dental Surgeon to the Queen from 1955 to 1960
- Alfred Fones (1869–1938) – came up with the name "dental hygienist" and founded that profession
- Sten Forshufvud – Swedish dentist who drew on his professional knowledge when theorizing about the poisoning of Napoleon
- Rosalie Fougelberg – Sweden's first female dentist after the profession was opened to women
[top]

=== G ===
- Samir Ghawshah – Leader of the Palestinian Popular Struggle Front
- Michael Glick – dean of SUNY Buffalo Dental School
- John Goodsir – wrote a noted essay on teeth
- Paul Gosar – American politician, representative in Congress from Arizona
- George Franklin Grant – first African-American professor at Harvard. He also invented a wooden golf tee
- Zane Grey – author of Riders of the Purple Sage and practicing dentist
- William Guy – Scottish dentist, creator of the Dental Act of 1921 in UK
[top]

=== H ===
- John "Dok" Hager – cartoonist whose nickname came from his days as a dentist
- Jim Harrell, Jr. – past chairman of the American Dental Association Council on Governmental Affairs, and a Democratic Party (United States) politician
- Chapin A. Harris – co-founded the first dental school in the US, and possibly anywhere
- Gillette Hayden - served as the first female president of the American Academy of Periodontology
- Horace H. Hayden – architect of the American system of dental education & organizer of professional dentistry
- Heimir Hallgrímsson – Icelandic football player and manager, former manager of the Iceland men's national football team, has practiced dentistry throughout his playing and managing career.
- Harold G. Hillam – General Authority of LDS Church
- Henriette Hirschfeld-Tiburtius - the first woman to take a full college course in dentistry, as Lucy Hobbs Taylor received credit for her time in dental practice before attending dental college
- John Henry "Doc" Holliday – Dentist and American Folklore icon, Gunfight at the O.K. Corral participant
- Matthew Hopcraft – public dentistry expert and MasterChef Australia contestant
- Les Horvath – winner of Heisman Trophy who became a dentist
- Edward Hudson – eminent dentist when the field was new, he is also noted for making fake "ruins"
- Lester C. Hunt – Democratic Party (United States) politician who served in the Dental Corps in World War I.(Committed suicide)
[top]

=== I ===
- Francis Brodie Imlach – Scottish dental pioneer. First dentist to use chloroform as an anaesthetic
[top]

=== J ===
- Cheddi Jagan – former president of Guyana
- Fatima Jinnah – sister of Muhammad Ali Jinnah and "Mother of the Nation" in Pakistan
- Emeline Roberts Jones - the first woman to practice dentistry in the United States
- Minnie Evangeline Jordon - established the first dental practice in the United States devoted only to pediatric patients, also published the first textbook on pedodontics, titled Operative Dentistry for Children
[top]

=== K ===
- Erhard Keller – speed skater at the Winter Olympic Games and professional dentist for over thirty years
- Ryan Kohlmeier – former professional baseball player in Major League Baseball
- Michael Krop – Democratic Party (United States) politician with a school named for him
- Peter Kunter – football player for Eintracht Frankfurt
[top]

=== L ===
- Gordon R. Lawson -New Zealand rugby player
- Donald Leake – dentist, inventor of the alloplastic tray, and oboist
- Charles Goodall Lee – first licensed dentist of Asian ancestry in the United States of America. He was a founder of Chinatown, Oakland, California, and helped fund the founding of the Chinese American Citizens Alliance
- Robert Lee – African-American emigrant to Ghana
- Faith Sai So Leong, also called Sai So Yeong - the first Chinese-American woman to graduate from a school of dentistry and become a dentist in the United States
- Petra Lie - the first female dentist in Norway
- Hardy Limeback – proponent who led water fluoridation efforts in Canada
- Göran Lindblad – Swedish politician
- John Linder – American politician, representative in Congress
- Lilian Lindsay the first licensed female dentist in Britain
- Jim Lonborg – in the Boston Red Sox Hall of Fame, he is now a dentist
- Mahlon Loomis – known for a wireless telegraph patent
- Jiko Luveni – Fijian dentist who works on combatting AIDS
- Alexander Gordon Lyle – United States Navy dentist and World War I Medal of Honor recipient and first military dentist to be promoted to Flag rank (Admiral/General).
[top]

=== M ===
- Bernie Machen – president of University of Florida and University of Utah
- Edward Maynard – treated United States Congressmen and in 1888 he held the chair of Dental Theory and Practice at the National university in Washington. (Better known for firearms inventions)
- Stanley McInnis – Canadian who moved a motion at a meeting of the Canadian Dental Association to adopt a code of ethics, also a politician
- Markus Merk – FIFA referee from Germany
- Ramón Mestre – former Governor of Córdoba
- Frederick B. Morrehead – helped save the University of Illinois at Chicago College of Dentistry
- Jack Miller – "racing dentist" who was in the Indianapolis 500
- Bill Mlkvy – former professional basketball player for the Philadelphia Warriors
- Mike Morton – football player
[top]

=== N ===
- John Newbrough – of Oahspe
- Phil Northrup – Spiritualist author
- Charlie Norwood – served in the Dental Corps and was a member of the United States Congress
- Hessam Nowzari – founder of the Taipei Academy of Reconstructive Dentistry in Taiwan
- Frederick Bogue Noyes – organized the first course on dental pathology in the United States
[top]

=== O ===
- Giovanni Battista Orsenigo – monk/dentist
- Weedon E. Osborne – United States Navy dentist and World War I Medal of Honor recipient
- Rodrigues Ottolengui – Sephardic Jewish dental pioneer who was one of the first to use X-rays (also wrote mystery novels)
[top]

=== P ===
- Ron Packard – Navy Dental Corps and a private practice, he was later on the U.S. House Committee on Appropriations
- Painless Parker – dentist and huckster
- William Paulus – swimmer
- Guillermo Peschard – Mexican founder of the UJED School of Dentistry
- Steve Petryk – curler
- Rudy Perpich – American dentist/politician of the Minnesota Democratic-Farmer-Labor Party
- William Albert Pommer – Canadian politician
- Fritz Pfeffer – dentist who hid with Anne Frank
[top]

=== Q ===
[top]

=== R ===
- Bessie Raiche – aviation pioneer
- Earl W. Renfroe – broke barriers for African Americans, headed a dentistry department
- Charles Richard – Canadian politician
- Jessica Rickert - the first female American Indian dentist in America
- Ida Rollins - the first African-American woman to earn a dental degree in the United States, which she earned from the University of Michigan
[top]

=== S ===
- Harry Sagansky – gangster trained in dentistry who had a practice
- Ben L. Salomon – American military dentist and World War II Medal of Honor recipient
- Hugo Sánchez – Mexican football player
- Isaac Schour – former dean of the University of Illinois at Chicago College of Dentistry
- Terry Schmidt – football player
- Chen Shih-chung - Taiwanese politician, the director of Taipei City Dentists Association
- Helen Rulison Shipley – first female dentist in Nevada
- Jeanne Sinkford - the first female dean of an American dental school (Howard University, School of Dentistry)
- Mike Simpson – US representative from Idaho
- Joseph Slogan – Canadian politician
- John Smith (dentist) – founder of the Edinburgh school of dentistry
- Mark Spitz – Olympic swimmer (was actually accepted to dental school, but competed in the Olympics instead)
- Charles Stent – dentist who advanced denture making
- Charles H. Strub – sports entrepreneur
- Jon Sudbø – Norwegian dentist linked to a case of scientific misconduct
[top]

=== T ===
- Lucy Hobbs Taylor – first woman to graduate from dental school (Ohio College of Dental Surgery in 1866)
- José Roberto Magalhães Teixeira – Brazilian politician
- Mohamed Khir bin Toyo – Malaysian politician
- Joseph Trumpeldor – Zionist national hero
- Charles Murray Turpin – Republican politician in the United States House of Representatives
- Carol I. Turner - the first female Chief of the U.S. Navy Dental Corps
[top]

=== U ===
[top]

=== V ===
[top]
- Mahesh Verma – Indian prosthodontist and the Director and Principal of Maulana Azad Institute of Dental Sciences

=== W ===
- Harold Gladstone Watkin (1882–1965) – orthodontist
- John Weisbeck – Canadian politician
- Thomas Bramwell Welch – founder of Welch's
- Caroline Louise Josephine Wells - the first Canadian woman to graduate from any dental school
- Horace Wells – pioneered the use of anesthesia in dentistry, later committed suicide
- Marie Imogene Williams – first African American female dentist to graduate from Howard University's dental school, in 1896
- Gerrit Wolsink – motocross racer
[top]

=== X ===
[top]

=== Y ===
[top]
- W. J. Younger – American dentist who performed some of the earliest and most groundbreaking research in the field of periodontology

=== Z ===
- Leonie von Meusebach–Zesch – pioneer female dentist who practiced in Texas, Alaska, Arizona and California
[top]

== Fictional dentists ==
- The aforementioned Britt Baker is routinely introduced in All Elite Wrestling as "Dr. Britt Baker, DMD", reflecting her real-life dental practice.
- Jeremy Hillary Boob (voiced by Dick Emery) – from Yellow Submarine.
- Matthew Brock – from NewsRadio. (Although he gave it up to work in radio and is only seen practicing in one episode)
- Dr. Carey – from Stuart Little
- Dr. Dillingham – from Prostho Plus.
- Walt Duncan – head of the household at the centre of comic strip Zits.
- Dr. Tariq Faraj – from Oz.
- Dr. Phoebus Farb – from The Little Shop of Horrors
- Dr. Barry Farber – Rachel's fiancé whom she left at the altar from Friends.
- The unnamed W.C. Fields character in the 1932 short film The Dentist.
- Bob Fish – a title character in Bob and Margaret.
- Wendell and Monica Wilkins: originally only named as Mr. and Mrs. Granger, parents of Hermione Granger – from the Harry Potter novels.
- Julia Harris – from the film Horrible Bosses.
- Ben Harper – from British sitcom My Family.
- Brock Hart – from the TV series Reba.
- Hermey the Elf – became a dentist in Rudolph the Red-Nosed Reindeer and the Island of Misfit Toys, prior was an elf.
- Jesse W. Heywood (Don Knotts) – from the 1968 comedy film The Shakiest Gun in the West, a remake of Bob Hope's The Paleface (1948).
- Orson Hodge – from Desperate Housewives.
- Carl Howell (John Stamos) – from the TV series Glee.
- Jin Shun-an (Yu Jin) - from the TV series My Tooth Your Love
- Nonoko Kishii – from The Dragon Dentist.
- Sheldon Kornpett (Alan Arkin) – Manhattan dentist in the 1979 comedy film The In-Laws.
- Capt. Walter Koskiusko Waldowski, "Painless Pole" – in MASH.
- Dr. Molar Fox, resident dentist of Lake Hoohaw in the Playhouse Disney show PB&J Otter.
- Bernard Nadler – from the TV series Lost.
- Zen'nosuke Maki – from the TV series Manpuku.
- Nicholas "Oz" Oseransky – from The Whole Nine Yards and The Whole Ten Yards.
- John Patterson – in For Better or For Worse.
- Peter "Painless" Potter (Bob Hope) – from the 1948 comedy film The Paleface. Bumbling dentist who was fooled into believing that he was a deadly gunfighter.
- Lincoln Rice DDS – from Broad City.
- Jerry Robinson – orthodontist who shared the office suite on The Bob Newhart Show
- Miss Root – dentist in the book Demon Dentist by David Walliams
- Dr. Frank Sangster – in Novocaine.
- Orin Scrivello, D.D.S. – Little Shop of Horrors, played by Steve Martin in the film adaptation
- Gen. Tarsal – from Adventure Time episode "Dentist"
- Dr. Teeth – of The Muppets, revealed to be Gerald Teeth Jr DDS in The Muppets Mayhem
- Tina Teeth – Dr Teeth's mother in The Muppets Mayhem
- Dr. Charley Shanowski (Ted McGinley) – from Hope & Faith
- Eugene Sutphin (Sam Waterston) – from Serial Mom.
- Christian Szell – from William Goldman's Marathon Man, later a movie by John Schlesinger
- Noah Werner (Alan Tudyk) – Suburgatory (TV series)
- Tim Whatley (Bryan Cranston) and Mr. Abbot (Robert Wagner) – from the NBC sitcom Seinfeld, Whatley alleged to be an insincere convert to Judaism.
- Julian Winston – adulterer in the play ) and its film adaptation
- Dr. Wolfe – from The Simpsons
- Isaac Yankem, DDS – professional wrestler portrayed by Glenn Jacobs, now known as Kane, in the WWF

== Other ==
- Greeeen – four member Japanese pop music band consisting entirely of dentists who studied at Ohu University in Fukushima
