= List of first women dentists by country =

This is a list of the first qualified female dentist to practice in each country, where that is known.

== Africa ==
Country	Dentist	Year of graduation	Year of starting practice
Burkina Faso	Véronique Kyelem	1972	1987
Ghana	Hilda Ayensu		
Kenya	Muthoni Gitata		
Liberia	Rachael Hill Townsend		
Namibia	Sarti Mwatilifange and another woman		1994
Nigeria	Simi Johnson and Grace Guobadia	1957	
South Africa	Jane Nathan	1917	
Sudan	Nashina Makos	c. 1963	

== Americas ==
Country	Dentist	Year of graduation	Year of starting practice
Argentina	Cidanelia R. González de Carrillo		1896
Bolivia	Maria H. Oropeza	1914	
Brazil	Isabella Von Sydow	1906	1906
Canada	Emma Gaudreau Casgrain		1898
Chile	Amelia Venegas	1884	
Colombia	Hortensia Lince		1890
Costa Rica	Pilar Celina Duval		
Cuba	Serafina Daumy y Martínez	1879	
Dominican Republic	Victoria Sofía Oliva Montás	1917	
Ecuador	Delfina Luis Rodríguez		1916
El Salvador	Bertha Orbelina González	1938	
Guatemala	Carlota Estévez Arrutia	1924	
Haiti	Marcelle Bellande (née Hakime)		
Honduras	Rosa Galo de Castillo	1948	
Mexico	Margarita Chorné y Salazar	1896	
Panama	Aida Illueca Avilés		
Peru	Ana Seminario de Mac Sorley		
Saint Lucia	Azmina Long	1980	
Suriname	Tine Putscher	1937	
United States	Emeline Roberts Jones		1855
Uruguay	Iride Casullo de Peluffo	1897	
Venezuela	Rosario Cotton	1909	

== Asia ==
Country	Dentist	Year of graduation	Year of starting practice
Bahrain	Zakia Salman	1972	1984
China	Zhang Qiongxian	1936	
India	Vimla Sood	1944	
Iran	Badri Teymourtash		
Iraq	Madiha Saleh Zaki	c. 1950s	
Japan	Kou Takahashi	1897	
Jordan	Aida Jamal Al-Alami		
Korea	Geum-bong Choi		
Kuwait	Eqbal Abdulmohsen Al-Asfour	1970	
Lebanon	Nihad Kfoury	1973	
Pakistan	Fatima Jinnah	1923	
Philippines	Nieva Basa Eraña-Velasquez		
Saudi Arabia	Fatima Al Nasrallah		
Sri Lanka	Rosaline Karthigesu		1947
Syria	Amira Sabaa El Layl		
United Arab Emirates	Ayehsa Sultan Al Suwaidi		
Yemen	Abeer Abdel Rahman Ahmed Al-Faqih		

== Europe ==
Country	Dentist	Year of graduation	Year of starting practice
Austria	Martha Wolf	1912	
Bulgaria	Yurdanka Kaldaramova-Senkova	1901	
Cyprus	Rebecca Savvidou		
Czech Republic	Štěpánka Líčková (country then known as Bohemia)	1910	
Denmark	Nicoline Møller	1888	1888
Estonia	Josephine Serre	1814	
Finland	Hedvig Eleonora Ståhlberg	1887	1887
France	Madeleine-Françoise Calais	1740	1740
Germany	Henriette Hirschfeld-Tiburtius	1869	1869
Greece	Eliza Karakatsani		1895
Hungary	Gizella Barát		1910
Iceland	Thyra Loftsson (née Lange)	1925	
Italy	Elena Venturi		
Latvia	Late Veibele	1901	
Luxembourg	Marcelle Dauphin	1922	1923
Malta	Carmen Joslin (née Attard)	1960	
Montenegro	Jevrosima Berezina Kaluđerović	1904	
Netherlands	Virginie Waltjen-Stadelmann	1885	1885
Norway	Petra Lie	1872	1872
Poland	Józefa Serre	1813	
Romania	Alma Mohora-Popovici		
Russia	Maria Nazon		1829
Serbia	Milica Mihajlović		
Slovenia	Pavla Marija Kocjančič		c. 1926
Spain	Polonia Sanz y Ferrer		1849
Sweden	Amalia Assur		1852
Switzerland	Mathilde Heumann	1887	
Turkey	Ayşe Şadiye and Azra Hatice	1926	
United Kingdom	Lilian Lindsay	1895	1895

== Oceania ==
Country	Physician	Year graduated medical school	Year began practice
Australia	Annie Praed; Margaret "Madge" Estelle Maltby-Robinson (née Barnes); Frances Dorothy Gray	1906-1907	
Fiji	Jiko Yasa (née Luveni)	1967	1967
New Zealand	Margaret Caro	1881	
Vanuatu	Toumelu Kalsakau		

== See also ==
- List of first female pharmacists by country
- List of first female physicians by country
- Women in dentistry
- Women in medicine
