= Women in dentistry in the United States =

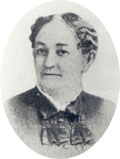
Emeline Roberts Jones became the first woman to practice dentistry in the United States in 1855.

There is a long history of women in dentistry in the United States.

== Timeline ==
=== 19th century ===
- 1855: Emeline Roberts Jones became the first woman to practice dentistry in the United States. She married the dentist Daniel Jones when she was a teenager, and became his assistant in 1855.
- 1866: Lucy Hobbs Taylor became the first woman to graduate from a dental college (Ohio Dental College).
- 1869: Henriette Hirschfeld-Tiburtius, born in Germany, became the first woman to take a full college course in dentistry, as Lucy Hobbs Taylor received credit for her time in dental practice before attending dental college. Henriette graduated from the Pennsylvania College of Dental Surgery in 1869.
- 1874: Fanny A. Rambarger became the second American woman to earn the degree of Doctor of Dental Surgery, which she did in 1874, when she graduated from the Pennsylvania College of Dental Surgery. She worked in Philadelphia and limited her practice to women and children only.
- 1879: Nellie Chapman became in 1879 the first registered female dentist in the American western territories; that was the first year dentists in those territories had to be registered, and she was registered as number 79.
- 1890: Ida Rollins became the first African-American woman to earn a dental degree in the United States, which she earned from the University of Michigan.
- 1892: The Women's Dental Association of the U.S. was founded in 1892 by Mary Stillwell-Kuesel with 12 charter members.
- 1897: Jessie Castle La Moreaux became the first woman dentist to practice in Texas.

=== 20th century ===
- 1904-1905: Faith Sai So Leong, also called Sai So Yeong, born in China, became the first Chinese-American woman to graduate from a school of dentistry and become a dentist in the United States. In 1904 she became the first woman of any race to graduate from the College of Physicians and Surgeons (now the University of the Pacific Arthur A. Dugoni School of Dentistry). In 1905 she was awarded the Doctor of Dental Surgery from that school, and after a trial of the State Board of Dental Examiners, which delayed the awarding of licenses, she was granted a dental license in August 1905.
- 1909: Minnie Evangeline Jordon established the first dental practice in the United States devoted only to pediatric patients.
- 1916: Gillette Hayden served as the first female president of the American Academy of Periodontology.
- 1920: Maude Tanner became the first recorded female delegate to the American Dental Association.
- 1921: During the annual meeting of the American Dental Association (ADA), several female dentists met in Milwaukee and formed the Federation of American Women Dentists, now known as the American Association of Women Dentists (AAWD). Their first president was Minnie Evangeline Jordon.
- 1923: Anita Martin became the first woman inducted into the national dental honor society (Omicron Kappa Upsilon).
- 1925: Minnie Evangeline Jordon published the first textbook on pedodontics, titled Operative Dentistry for Children.
- 1951: Helen E. Myers of Lancaster, Pennsylvania, a 1941 graduate of Temple University, was commissioned as the Army Dental Corps' first female dental officer in 1951.
- 1953: Raya Rachlin became the first woman commissioned as a United States Air Force dentist.
- 1964: Jeanne Sinkford became the first female prosthodontist with a PhD degree; her degree was in Physiology, and from Northwestern University.
- 1974: Patricia Smathers Moulton became the first woman certified by the American Board of Prosthodontics.
- 1975: On July 1, 1975, Jeanne Sinkford became the first female dean of an American dental school when she was appointed the dean of Howard University School of Dentistry.
- 1975: Jessica Rickert became the first female American Indian dentist in America upon graduating from the University of Michigan School of Dentistry in 1975. She was a member of the Prairie Band Potawatomi Nation, and a direct descendant of the Indian chief Wahbememe (Whitepigeon).
- 1977: The American Association of Dental Schools (founded in 1923 and renamed the American Dental Education Association in 2000) had Nancy Goorey as its first female president in 1977.
- 1988: The American Student Dental Association elected its first female president, N. Gail McLaurin of the Medical University of South Carolina.
- 1991: Geraldine Morrow became the first female president of the American Dental Association.
- 1993: Juliann Bluitt Foster became the first female president of the American College of Dentists.
- 1997: Hazel J. Harper became the first female president of the National Dental Association.

=== 21st century ===
- 2001: Marjorie Jeffcoat became the first female editor of The Journal of the American Dental Association.
- 2003: Rear Admiral Carol I. Turner became the first female Chief of the Navy Dental Corps.
- 2003: Nancy S. Arbree became the first female president of the American College of Prosthodontists.
- 2003: Rhonda Jacob became the first female American Board of Prosthodontics examiner.
- 2004: Sandra Madison, of Asheville, North Carolina, was elected as the first female president of the American Association of Endodontists.
- 2004: Janet Hatcher Rice became the first female president of the Academy of Laser Dentistry.
- 2006: Jane D. Brewer became the first female president of the American Academy of Fixed Prosthodontics.
- 2006: Rhonda Jacob became the first female president of the American Academy of Maxillofacial Prosthetics.
- 2007: Kaumudi Joshipura became the NIH endowed chair and director of the center for clinical research and health promotion at University of Puerto Rico, Medical Sciences Campus.
- 2007: Laura Kelly became the first female president of the American Academy of Cosmetic Dentistry.
- 2008: Beverly Largent, a pediatric dentist from Paducah, Ky., became the first female president of the American Academy of Pediatric Dentistry.
- 2008: Valerie Murrah became the first female president of the American Academy of Oral and Maxillofacial Pathology.
- 2009: Kathleen T. O'Loughlin was chosen as the first female executive director of the American Dental Association.
- 2010: Rhonda Jacob became the first female president of the American Board of Prosthodontics.
- 2011: Ruth Bol, a Comanche woman, became the first female president of the Society of American Indian Dentists.
- 2013: Gayle Glenn was elected as the first female president of the American Association of Orthodontists.

== See also ==
- Dental service organizations
- List of first women dentists by country
- Women in dentistry
