= Dentistry for babies =

Dentistry for babies is a branch of pediatric dentistry provided to children from birth to around 36 months of age, aiming to maintain or re-establish a good oral health status and create a positive attitude in parents and children about dentistry. Although concerns about dental treatment directed to babies have been reported at the beginning of the twentieth century, only recently has the dental community started to focus on this area of dentistry, due to the high dental caries (decay) prevalence observed in young children.

== History ==
The first setting for providing dental care exclusively to babies started in 1986, at Londrina's State University (Brazil), changing the concept from early treatment of carious lesions and their consequences to early educative-preventive attention. These concepts were disseminated throughout the entire country introducing new clinics with a similar philosophy such as the Baby Clinic of Araçatuba Dental School, São Paulo State University (UNESP), and also abroad.

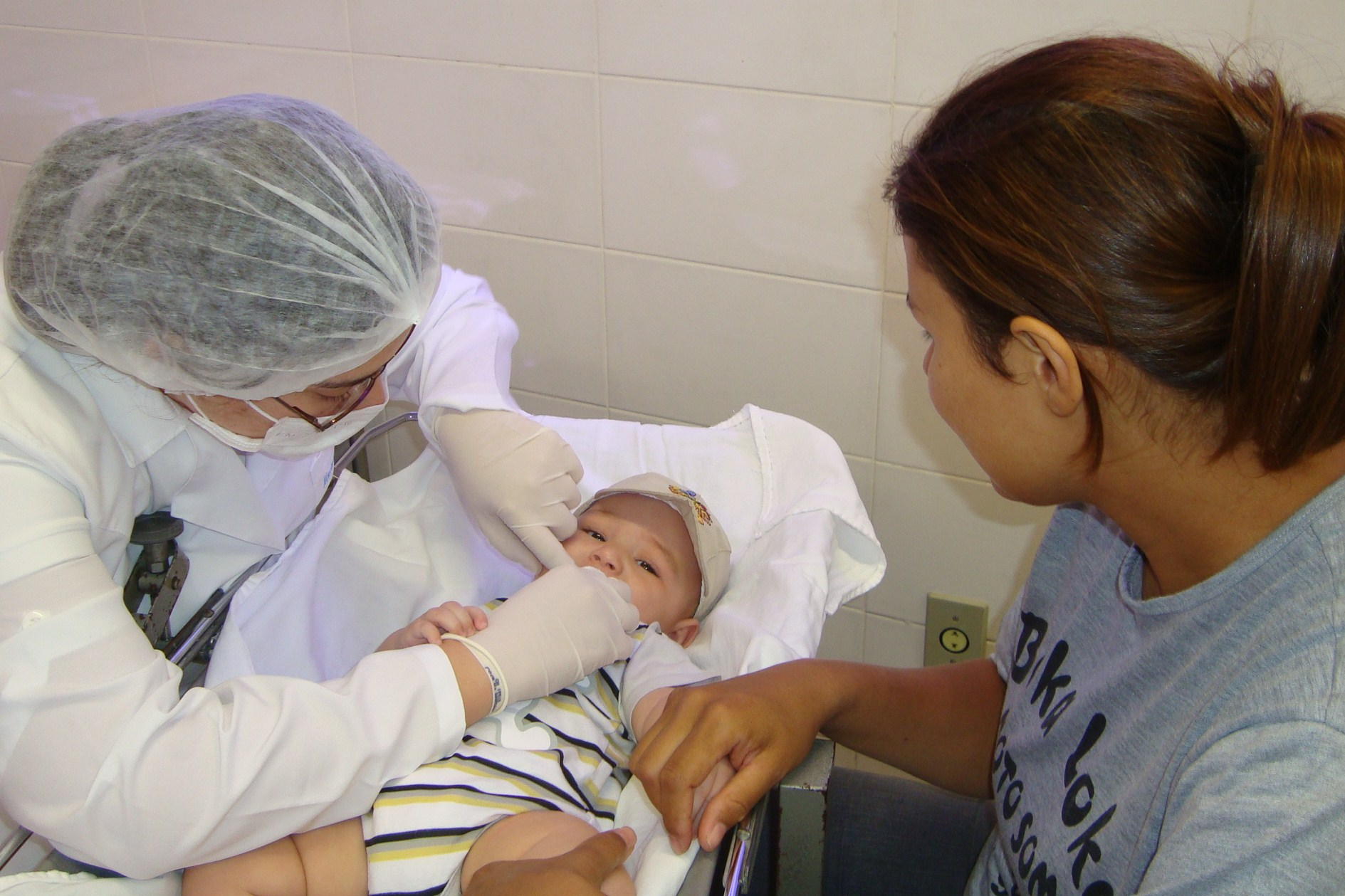
Clinical session at the Baby Clinic, Araçatuba Dental School, Brazil

== Objectives ==
The general aim is to provide dental assistance to 0-3-year-old children, through an educative-preventive oral health program directed to parents and children comprising the diagnosis, prevention, treatment, and control of the most common clinical situations at this age range (dental caries, dental trauma, alterations of tooth development, etc.).

== Meetings with parents ==
At the Baby Clinic of Araçatuba Dental School, parents are required to enroll their babies from birth up to 6 months of age. Prior to the first clinical session, parents attend a lecture providing general information about:

- Oral health within the context of systemic health
- The importance of the deciduous teeth
- Non-nutritive sucking habits (thumb and pacifier)
- Dental trauma: what to do if it happens
- Dental caries as a disease, and the possibility of its prevention
- Early childhood caries
- Caries prevention
- Professional treatment x home care
- How the Baby Clinic works

Meetings occur on a regular basis. At the end of them, parents are shown how to clean the baby's mouth and how to use a fluoridated solution. Afterward, the baby's first appointment is booked.

== Medical history ==
A general clinical examination evaluates the baby's health as a whole. If necessary, the baby is referred to professionals in other areas for further examination. Caries risk is determined by correlating information gathered through anamnesis, clinical examination, and environmental factors:

- Influence of diet: night time feeding, consumption of cariogenic foods and beverages.
- Influence of hygiene: presence of visible dental plaque (biofilm), presence and quality of oral hygiene procedures.
- Use of fluorides.
- Oral health status of parents (especially mother).

== Oral examination ==
Specific educative orientation will be directed to parents according to the needs of the baby's caries risk. Caries risk must be determined in this first appointment. The type of assistance to be provided to the baby will depend on the risk.

== Treatment approaches ==
For low caries risk children, the aim is to maintain the baby's oral health. Clinical sessions include hygiene with hydrogen peroxide (1 part of H_{2}O_{2} + 3 parts of boiled or filtered water) and application of 0.1% sodium fluoride (NaF) solution using cotton swab. At home, parents and caregivers are instructed to keep the same dietary and hygiene habits, and apply a 0.05% NaF solution once per day with a cotton swab at night time before the baby sleeps. Follow-up appointments are booked quarterly. At the first follow-up session, the caregiver is asked to perform the hygiene procedures and to apply the fluoridated solution under professional supervision to evaluate how skilled they are in performing those tasks, as well as to correct possible mistakes. If caries risk remains low, a quarterly scheme can be kept.

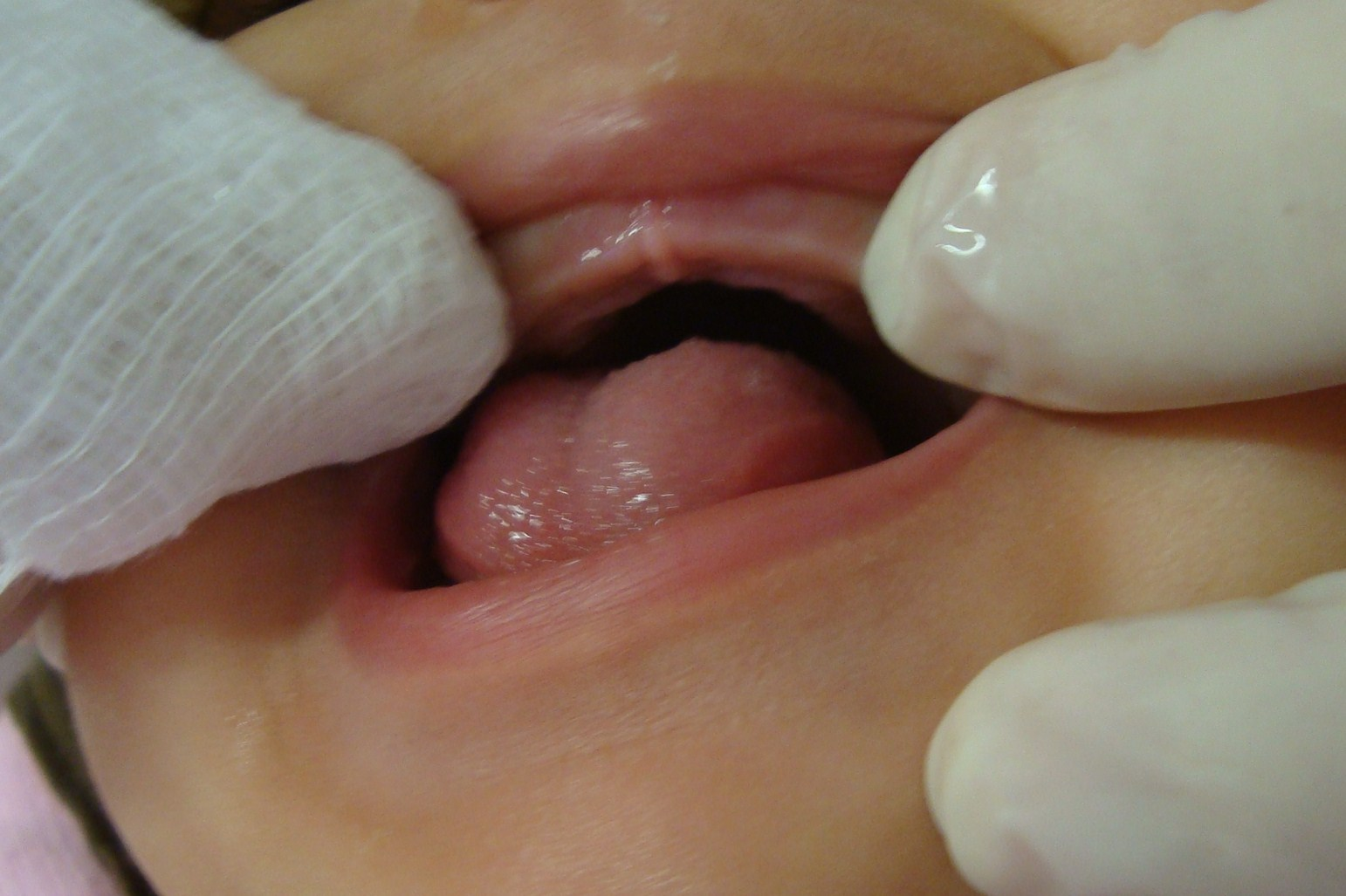
Oral hygiene of an edentulous baby's mouth with gauze and hydrogen peroxide

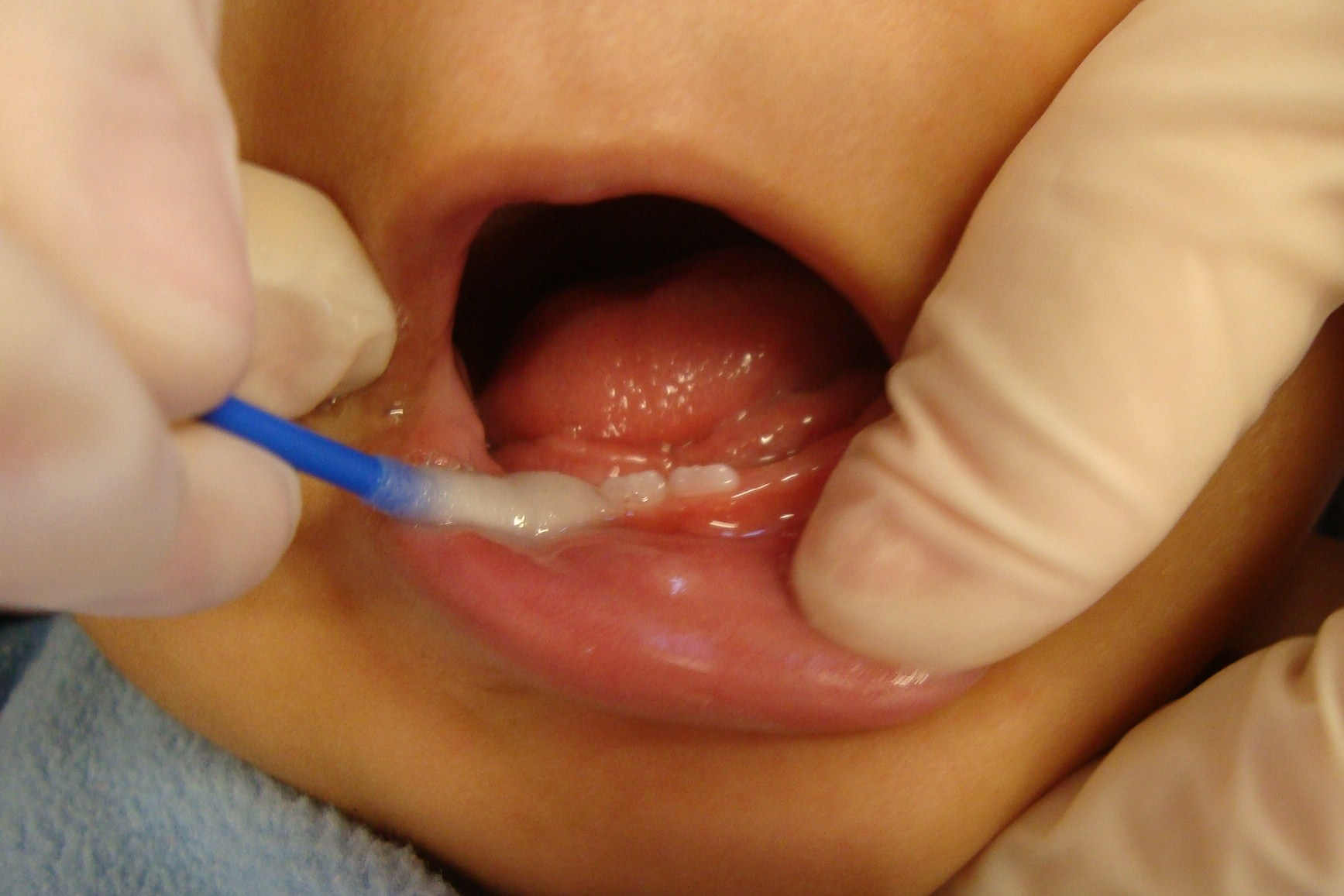
Application of 0.1% NaF solution with a cotton swab

For high caries risk children, the aim is to revert the baby's caries risk, as well as to increase tooth resistance. Clinical sessions include the identification and reversion of risk factors for caries – parents are oriented on how to control (either eliminating or reducing) caries risk factors. Tooth resistance will be increased by applying a 0.1% NaF solution over all tooth surfaces. At home, parents and caregivers will adopt measures for oral hygiene and diet control, as well as eliminate bad oral hygiene and dietary habits that increase the risk of caries development. Daily application of a 0.05% NaF solution is also recommended. Follow-up appointments are booked every 1 or 2 months. As with low caries risk children, the caregiver will be asked to perform the hygiene procedures and to apply the fluoridated solution under professional supervision to evaluate how skilled they are in performing those tasks, as well as to correct possible mistakes. Caries risk must be evaluated again. Parents will be evaluated on how the recommendations done in the first session are being followed, which could potentially reduce the baby's caries risk.

For children with caries lesions, the aims are to re-establish oral equilibrium, by eliminating or reducing causal factors, as well as by increasing tooth resistance. Four clinical sessions, with a 1-week interval, are performed, so the dentist is able to act over causal factors (instructing parents), to increase tooth resistance (hygiene with diluted H_{2}O_{2} solution and gauze; application of fluoride varnish over white spot lesions and softened carious lesions), as well as to restore tooth cavities with glass ionomer cement (atraumatic restorative treatment). At home, parents and caregivers will adopt measures for oral hygiene and diet control, as well as daily application of a 0.05% NaF solution. The first follow-up appointment is booked after 1 month, when caries risk must be re-evaluated to determine the appropriate periodicity for checkups. At the first follow-up session, the caregiver will be asked to perform the hygiene procedures and to apply the fluoridated solution under professional supervision to evaluate how skilled they are in performing those tasks, as well as to correct possible mistakes.

== Ongoing care ==
Caries risk assessment will be performed on a regular basis regardless of the initial caries risk evaluation, so changes in the protocol can be implemented whenever necessary.

== Oral Health Risks ==
"Pediatric Dentistry: A Clinical Approach" aims to provide information about dental problems, and related conditions. The developments of oral health in infants impacts the overall risks, health conditions and issues.

== Early Childhood Caries ==
Dental caries are the most significant cause of health problems among babies. The meta analysis of dental caries in children, a sample size of 80,405 was 46.2% (95% CI: 41.6–50.8%), and the prevalence of dental caries in permanent teeth in children in the world with a sample size of 1,454,871 was 53.8% (95% CI: 50–57.5%).

== Causes and Diagnoses ==
“Early Childhood caries update: A review of causes, diagnoses, and treatments” aim is the factors and causes to treat adolescents early dental care. “Tooth extraction is a common and necessary treatment for advanced carries of one or more decayed” found in a child 72 months of age or younger.

== Scholarly Journals ==
- The Journal of Clinical Pediatric Dentistry published, "Assessment of Pediatricians' Knowledge, Practices and Attitudes on Oral Health/Care in Children in the Last Decade." It discusses various aspects of dental health, symptoms and strategies for hygiene in babies.
- The Pediatric Journal Dentistry published, “Dental caries in primary and permanent teeth in children’s worldwide, 1995 to 2019: a systematic review and meta-analysis.” A bi-monthly peer-reviewed journal providing pediatric dental research for adolescents.
