= Olive Myrtle Henderson =

African-American dentist (1877–1957)

- Born: 1877; Chicago
- Died: June 14, 1957 (aged 79–80)
- Occupation: Dentist

Olive Myrtle Henderson (1877–1957) was the second African American woman dentist in the city of Chicago and the first African American woman to graduate with a degree in dentistry from Northwestern University.

== Biography ==
Henderson was born in Chicago in 1877. As a young woman she was a patient of Ida Gray Nelson Rollins, the first African American female dentist in the United States. Ida Gray Nelson Rollins had graduated from the University of Michigan in 1890. It was Henderson's experience with Ida Gray Nelson Rollins that inspired her to become a dentist. Henderson graduated from Northwestern University in 1908. A little over a decade before Henderson graduated, Emma Ann Reynolds graduated as the first Black woman to receive a medical degree in 1895.

In 1911, Henderson married Thomas Sterling Officer. Officer had been a practicing physician in Chicago since 1906. Together they had a daughter named Mercedes. In 1912, Henderson established a private practice in Chicago's South Side. She retired in 1948 after 40 active years as a dentist. She was also an active member of the National Association of Colored Women and her church St. Thomas Episcopal.
