= Michele Aerden =

Belgian dentist

Michele Aerden is a dentist and was president of the FDI World Dental Federation from 2005 to 2007. She was the first woman ever to be elected president of this non-profit organization and worked to promote oral health within the World Health Organization and worldwide.

== Youth, education, family ==
Michèle Aerden was born in Hasselt, Belgium. She has been married to Guy Warlop since 1966 and has two sons, two daughters-in-law, and five grandchildren. At the age of 20, Michèle started and ran a small business with 13 employees in haute couture. She then closed her company and started dental studies at the age of 28.In 1977, Michèle graduated with distinction in dental studies from the ULB, Université Libre de Bruxelles.

== Dental career and national achievements ==
Michèle practices in her own private dental clinic in Brussels, Belgium. She has been very involved in the Belgian Dental Association.

Activities at the national level:

Chambres Syndicales Dentaires which were created in 1994 by the merger of the two French-speaking dental chambers:

- Councillor 1994–2016

- Vice President 1995-1997 and 2000

- President 2003-2004 (first woman president of a dental association in Belgium)

Conseil de l’Art Dentaire: advisory committee to the Minister of Health:

- Member 2013-2015: Member of the WG “Deontologie”

- Member 1999-2006

- Leader of the WG: Compétences particulières

== International career ==
Michèle Aerden was Vice-President and President of the Chambres Syndicales Dentaires. Her first international involvement was as the Belgian delegate to the FDI. She then served as the Chair of the Individual Members Committee and as a member of the Committee of Ethics from 1994 to 1997. In the FDI European Regional Organization, she was the founder and leader of the working group on women in dentistry and a member of the working group on social security in Europe. She became a member of the FDI Council in 1997, the second woman to be nominated to that position. She served as a member of the Committee of Developing Countries from 1998 to 2001 and was a member of the group strategy. She started Women Dentists Worldwide in 2001; this group published the Kuala Lumpur Declaration. In the FDI Council, she led the governance task force from 2003 to 2004 and became President-Elect in 2003 and President in 2005.

Activities on the international level:

FDI World Dental Federation, is a federation of 191 national and international associations from all over the world representing 1 million dentists. The vision and mission can be found on: www.fdiworldental.org

- 2007–present: Honorary President of the FDI Section Women Dentists Worldwide
- 2005-2007: President FDI (first woman in 105 years of FDI)
- 2003-2005: President-elect FDI
- 2002-2004: Chairman of the task team: “Governance”
- 2001-2005: Leader of “Women Dentist Worldwide”
- 2000-2001: Author of draft statement “Illegal Practice” adopted GA 2002
- 1999-2000: Member of the WG Strategy “Mission to Action”
- 1998-2001: Member of the Committee of Developing Countries
- 1997-2007: Member of the FDI Council (second woman in 97 years)
- 1995-1997: Chairperson of the Forum of National Secretaries
- 1994-1997: Chairperson of the Individual Members Committee
- 1987-2005: National Secretary

ERO: European Regional Organisation of the FDI represents 40 European countries.

- 2014-2017: Member of WG "Quality of Care"
- 2011–present: Member of WG Integration
- 1987-2005; 2011-2017: Delegate for Belgium
- Member of the WG “Social Security in Europe”
- Leader of the WG “Women in Dentistry” 1996-2005

CED: Dental Liaison Committee of the European Commission (advisory committee founded by EU):

- 2013–2016: Auditor
- 1995-2006: Auditor
- 1992-2005: Member of the Belgian delegation
- Member of the WG: European Health Policy in the New Millennium
- Member of the WG: Teeth bleaching

== Vision for the World Dental Federation ==
As a member of the Council, she was part of the Committee of Developing Countries and a member of the Task Force “Strategy; From Mission to Action." During her period as President-Elect (2004–2005), Michèle centered her efforts on the review of the FDI governance and finances. Consequently, the new governance was adopted and the constitution adapted. Under her presidency, the FDI made had a positive balance sheet for the first time in ten years.

During her presidency, Michèle Aerden decided to focus on 3 issues:

1. Excellency
2. Medical Positioning of the Dental Profession
3. Ethics

1) Excellency
Excellency at all levels of the organization; the FDI has performed exceptionally well during her tenure. The Annual World Dental Congresses organized by the FDI were very successful. Policy statements were reviewed, improved, and renewed. During the General Assembly of 2007, the FDI decided to implement the World Oral Health Day, which will be held on 12 September each year.

As President, Michèle Aerden gave a new positioning to the FDI President’s role. During each of her visits in nearly 60 countries, she consistently met the President of the country or the Prime Minister, and the ministers of Health and sometimes Minister of Education in order to advocate for a strategy of oral health integrated into the strategy of general health through prevention, planning and budget. “No general health without oral health !!” was her leitmotiv. She obtained tangible results during those visits and always received large media coverage. In 2005, he presented in Madrid, the book "Las primeras mujeres dentistas en España," written by Doctor Julio González Iglesias, and was received by Doctor Pilar Martín Santiago, President of the Asociación de Mujeres Dentistas en España (AMUDENES).

2) Medical Positioning of the Profession
Michèle Aerden is convinced that it is necessary to increase the recognition of the dental profession as a fully medical profession. Twice she introduced a candidate of the dental field for the Nobel Prize in Medicine. In 2007, for the first time in 26 years, a resolution concerning oral health was on the agenda of the WHO. The resolution was adopted on 23 May 2007 by the 191 member countries of the WHO, and the Director General of the WHO, Dr. Chan, recognized the urgency to acknowledge oral diseases and their impact on the socio-economic development of a country.

3) Ethics
Ethics are the foundation to the success of the dental profession and organisations. Without ethics, there's no trust nor credibility. It was under her presidency that the FDI launched the first “Dental Ethics Manual." The FDI also launched conferences tackling ethics and its role in international health NGOs.

Travelling around the globe with the message ‘No general health without oral health» allows Michèle Aerden to meet and collaborate with known experts beyond the dental world: Professor Muhammad Yunus (micro credits) Dr. Bertrand Piccard (ballooner) Madame WU Yi (vice-president of the People's Republic of China) Michelle Bachelet (President of Chile), etc.

Through her 20 years of activity with the FDI, and particularly in her last two years as President, the contribution of Michèle Aerden to improving the quality of life and well-being of hundreds of millions of people has been recognized by her peers with numerous awards, and also by the FDI partners and the dental industry.

== Awards ==
2008

1. Honorary President of Women Dentists Worldwide.

2007

1. Award of FOLA, Federacion Odontologica Latin America (19 countries) for raising the level of oral health in Latin America.
2. Leadership Excellency by IDEM, International Dental Manufacturers, for raising the level of oral care worldwide
3. Honorary member of the American Association of Women Dentists

2006

1. Nominated “International Dentist of the Year 2006" by the Academy of Dentist International, representing 89 countries
2. Honorary Fellowship of Pierre Fauchard Academy
3. Qana Scientific Award of the Libanese Dental Association
4. Honorary member of Cyprus Dental Association
5. Honorary member of Colegio Odontologico de Lima - Peru
6. Honoured by Associaçcao Brasileira de Odontologia seçao Minas Gerais - Brazil
7. Honoured by Federacion Odontologica Colombiana
8. Honoured by the Academy Dentistry International section, Peruvian
9. Certificate of Appreciation of Asian Pacific Dental Federation
10. Certificate of Appreciation of Sri Lanka Dental Association
11. Certificate of Appreciation of Collegio de Cirujano Dentistas de Chili
12. Registered by the Cyprus Dental Council as recognition for the work done in Cyprus

2005
Honorary member of the Armenian Dental Association

2004

1. Honorary member of the Associazione Italiana Odontoiatri
2. Honorary member of the International Dental Association
3. Citoyenne d’honneur de la ville de Paris (médaille vermeil)

2002
Honorary Member of the American Dental Association

== Conferences ==
Dr. Aerden has spoken at the following conferences:

Public Health

- 2016 Almaty, Kazakhstan Modern aspects of a dental association. Dental development by NDAs
- 2015 St. Petersburg, Russia: "European standards of Continuing Dental Education and the vision of the futur of
- the dental profession"
- 2014 Irkutsk, Siberia "European standards of dental education, the new EU directives"
- 2013 Almaty, Kazakhstan: "Oral Health Indicators in Europe”
- 2012 Moscow, Russia: "Future Challenges for the Dental Profession and Associations in Europe”
- 2010 Moscow: Russia: “Different Public Health Concepts and Training Models in Europe”
- 2007 Geneva, Switzerland; World Health Organisation “Role of an NGO in Oral Health"
- 2007 Beijing, China “The importance of prevention”
- 2006 Cyprus: Introduction of Oral Care in the Social Security
- 2006 Lisbon, Portugal; European Commission “Health Strategies in Europe”
- 2006 Como, Italy, “Challenges for the Dental Profession in the 21st Century"
- 2006 Lomé, Togo, joins WHO “Prevention in Schools"
- 2003 Delft, Nederland Minister of Health “Health professionals in enlarged European Union“
- 2003 Université de Lyon : “Role of European and World dental organizations in public health”

Oral Health and General Health

- 2018 Ulan Ude, Buryat Republic, "Impact of International organisations on the daily practice of each dentist"
- 2017 Kyzyl Tuva Republic "FDI and you "
- 2017 Crimea, Simferopol "Healthy school program"
- 2017 Moscow, Russia " International organisations improving Oral Health and Quality of Live"
- 2015 Ulan Ude Republic of Buryatya Leading the world to Optimal Oral Health
- 2009 Istanbul, Turkey, “Oral Health integral part of General Health”
- 2008 Bamako, Mali “Tabagisme ou Santé”
- 2008 Tunis, Tunisie, “Tabac ou Santé”
- 2007, Copenhague, Denmark, GA of the World Medical Association “Oral health integral part of general health”
- 2007 Luanda, Angola; “Medecina Dentaria”
- 2007 Sofia, Bulgaria: “Oral Health integral part of General Health”
- 2007 Sun City, South Africa; “Oral Health integral part of General Health”
- 2007 Cotonou, Bénin
- 2007 Jakarta, Indonesia
- 2006 Bogota, Colombia
- 2006 Colombo, Sri Lanka “Oral Health integral part of General Health”
- 2006 San Domingo, Republic Dominicana « Una salud bucodental y general óptima para toda la gente.
- 2006 Karachi, Pakistan;
- 2006 Ouagadougou, Burkina Faso “Tabagisme ou Santé
- 2006 Argentina
- 2006 Beirout, Libanon “Oral Health integral part of General Health”
- 2005 Budapest, Hungaria, Semmelweis University; Oral Health integral part of General Health
- 2005 La Havana, Cuba Federation Odontologia Latino-america « Una salud bucodental y general óptima para toda la gente. »

Ethics

- 2007 Toronto, Canada, International Dental Ethics and Law Congress “Role of a global federation and human rights”

Industry

- 2008 Paris, France Comident “FDI, International Dental Federation, impact on the industry”
- 2007 Brugge, Belgique; Association des Dépôts Dentaires Européens, ADDE; “ l’Impact et les Conséquences des Directives Européennes dans le Marché Intérieur »
- 2006 Brussels Club Lorraine “A Healthy company start with a healthy smile”

Women in Dentistry, Women Leadership

- 2015 Dublin Ireland "From haute couture to President of the FDI"
- 2010 Bahia, Brazil, American Dental Education Association “Women's Leadership, how you can and could
- make a difference “
- 2009 Singapore, “Women’s Leadership”
- 2008 Stockholm, Sweden, “Women dentist Worldwide”
- 2008 Bangkok, Thailand “Women dentist Worldwide”
- 2008 Istanbul, Turkey, “Women dentist Worldwide”
- 2007 Macau, China “Women’s Leadership”
- 2007 Casablanca, Marocco, “Women dentist Worldwide
- 2005 Montreal, Canada “Women Dentist Worldwide”
- 2004 Bukarest, Roumania, “Women in Dentistry”
- 2004 New Delhi, India; Women dentist Worldwide
- 2001 Kuala Lumpur, Malaysia : Women dentist worldwide
- 1998 Barcelone, Spain FDI congress “Lifting the ceiling in real time”
- 1997 Istanbul, Turkey, European Regional Organisation :
- Women in Dentistry results of european survey (38 countries)
- 1997 Goteborg, Sweden, ADEA (American Dental Education Association)”From haute couture to Dentistry”
- 1995 Paris, France ADF Congress “Féminisation de la profession dentaire”
