= Rabab Fetieh =

Saudi academic

Dr. Rabab Mohammad Abdulqader Fetieh (Arabic: رباب محمد عبدالقادر مغيربى فتيح) is a Saudi academic, currently a Professor of Orthodontics at the Faculty of Dentistry in King Abdulaziz University (KAU). She was Vice-Dean of the same institution (1993–2003) and a member of the founding faculty. Dr. Fetieh was head of the Orthodontic division at KAU (1989–2004) and was the Assistant Dean for Research and Post-graduate Affairs.

She received her BDS from Alexandria University in Egypt and her DMSc from Harvard University. She is a pioneer in her field, as she is Saudi Arabia's first female orthodontist.

Her husband is the well known Saudi pediatrician Tarek Baghdady. She currently resides in Jeddah, Saudi Arabia with her husband and 3 children.

== See also ==
- List of Harvard University people
- List of dentists
