= Sri Lanka Dental Association =

Dental organization

- Abbreviation: SLDA
- Formation: December 6, 1932; 94 years ago
- Headquarters: Sri Lanka
- President: Prof. Manil Fonseka (2024)
- Website: https://slda.lk/

The Sri Lanka Dental Association (SLDA) is the national professional association for dental practitioners in Sri Lanka. Established in 1932, it is one of the oldest dental associations in the country. The SLDA claims to be dedicated to promoting oral health, advancing dental education and practice, and advocating for dental professionals in Sri Lanka.

== History and Purpose ==
The Sri Lanka Dental Association (SLDA) was founded in Colombo, Sri Lanka, on December 6, 1932, by a group of dental professionals led by Dr. E. R. Amarasekara. Its initial objective was to establish a platform for collaboration, knowledge sharing, and promoting high standards in dental care. The association supports professional development by facilitating continuing education and training for dental practitioners. Additionally, the SLDA has advocates for the enhancement of oral health policies and standards in Sri Lanka. The organization is also engaged in public health initiatives, promoting oral health awareness and preventive dental care practices across the country.

== Governance Structure ==
The SLDA is governed by an elected Executive Committee comprising dental professionals from various specialties. It operates through several subcommittees focusing on specific areas like education, research, ethics, and public relations.

== Publications ==
The SLDA publishes a peer-reviewed journal, the Sri Lanka Dental Journal, which serves as a platform for dental research and scholarly articles. This journal is recognized within the Sri Lankan dental community.

== Affiliations ==
The SLDA maintains affiliations with international dental associations and organizations to foster global collaboration and knowledge exchange in the field of dentistry, including the FDI World Dental Federation and the Commonwealth Dental Association.
