= Jeanne Sinkford =

American dentist (1933–2025)

Jeanne Craig Sinkford (January 30, 1933 – October 1, 2025) was an American dentist and academic administrator. She was the first female dean of an American dental school. She is a senior scholar in residence at the American Dental Education Association and a professor and dean emeritus at the dental school of Howard University.

Sinkford died on October 1, 2025, at the age of 92.

== Growing Up ==
Sinkford was born on Capital Hill in the nation's capital. Her parents Richard Edward and Geneva Jefferson Craig, were both native Marylanders and federal government employees. Sinkford had a close relationship with her father, who taught her practical skills such as fishing, painting, wiring circuits, building furniture, interpreting the news, and saving money. Her parents valued education and ensured all their children graduated from college.

Sinkford attended both public and private schools, including a public elementary school, a Catholic middle school, and Dunbar High School, a college preparatory school for "colored" students in the District of Columbia. Dunbar employed teachers with master's degrees who mentored students and promoted academic achievement. Sinkford's first leadership role was as captain of the Dunbar Girl Cadet Corps, where she learned military protocol, ethics, and drill exercises. Winning the citywide competition was a significant honor for both the school and the girls in Company D.

Sinkford met her husband Stanley at Howard University. They had three children, two daughters and one son.

== Becoming a Dentist ==
Despite financial limitations, the Sinkford family prioritized education through careful planning and mutual support. Her parents devised a strategy in which each sibling, upon graduating from college, would assist the next in line. As the youngest, Sinkford benefited from this system, allowing her to pursue an extensive education -- four years of college, four years of dental school, and three years of graduate study. Her academic ambitions were further supported by fellowships for both undergraduate and postdoctoral studies. This thoughtful approach and dedicated family support were instrumental in enabling Sinkford to begin her academic journey at an early age.

Sinkford was a protégé. She started an undergraduate program at Howard University at the age of 16, having skipped her fifth and eighth academic years. Her undergraduate majors were psychology and chemistry. She graduated with honors and was inducted in Phi Beta Kappa.

== Career ==
Sinkford was one of four sisters who all went on to attend college. Her Sinkford's career contains many firsts. At the age of 16, Sinkford enrolled in college at Howard University, studying psychology and chemistry before pursuing dental school there. After graduating from dental school, Sinkford became the first woman Chair of the department of prosthodontics, had a part-time dental practice, and earned a Ph.D. in physiology at Northwestern University. This made her the first female prosthodontist with a PhD degree. She was the first black named to the National Advisory Dental Council; and was the first woman to be named as Associate Dean in dentistry.

Later, she chaired the prosthodontics department at Howard, and she completed a residency in pediatric dentistry in 1974–1975. On July 1, 1975, Sinkford became the first female dean of an American dental school in the United States, and possibly in the world when she was appointed the dean of Howard University, School of Dentistry. Sinkford served as dean for 16 years until 1991. She has been a member of the faculty for 33 years.

During her tenure as Dean, some of the major accomplishment that have taken place are full accreditation of all the academic programs; completion of the $10.5 million construction/renovation project; an aggressive minority recruitment program involving alumni; the addition of new academic programs in general dentistry, general practice residency and baccalaureate degrees for dental hygiene; a state-of-the-art infection control program; a dental implantology team for clinical practice and research; and a new $333,000 research development fund which will enable the College to become more competitive for extramural research grants. These accomplishments have been possible through the team effort that exists at the College and with the alumni.

Dr. Sinkford has been a member of numerous committees including, but not limited to: consultant to the National Board of Dental Examiners from 1971-1979, Vice Chairman of the Metropolitan Washington Section of the American College of Dentists from 1981-83, and a member of the Editorial Board of Black Health in 1990. Her stellar performance has been punctuated by many honors and awards over the years. She is listed in Who's who Among Women, Who's Who in America, Who's Who in the World, and cited in the Undaunted Trailblazers - Minority Women Leaders for Oral Health.

Sinkford then became associate executive director of the American Dental Education Association. She established its Center for Equity and Diversity in 1998, and directed it for 17 years.

In 2015, Sinkford received the Distinguished Service Award from the American Dental Association. She is also a past recipient of the Candace Award from the National Coalition of 100 Black Women. She is a member of the Institute of Medicine and a fellow of the American College of Dentists and the International College of Dentists.

"I have been called a Black pioneer," "Renaissance woman," and a modern Candace" because I dedicated my life to the cause of overcoming social, cultural, and educational inequities in our society by forceful leadership and in constant support of equal opportunities and civil liberty. As an octogenarian and scholar, I continue to learn, lead, and serve."

== Leadership ==
When Sinkford returned to Howard in 1964, she became the first woman in the United States to chair a prosthodontics department, leading the college's largest department. Dean Russell A. Dixon (1898-1974) appointed her based on her strong qualifications following the previous chair's retirement. This appointment represented a significant shift and an opportunity for visionary leadership. Although younger than many department members who had taught her, she implemented collaborative leadership, introduced a faculty evaluation program linking merit pay to performance, and led the adoption of collaborative teaching and total-patient care concepts.

From 1967 to 1974, under Dean Joseph L. Henry (1924-2011), Sinkford served as associate dean for advanced education research and special programs. She oversaw academic policy, promoted interdepartmental collaboration, and directed research and outreach initiatives. Frequently serving as interim leader in the dean's absence, she received leadership training from Harvard University and the Research Triangle. In 1964, during a sabbatical at Children's Hospital Medical Center in Washington, D.C., she began developing a postdoctoral program in adolescent dentistry and advanced research on behavioral and developmental factors affecting patient care.

In 1975, Sinkford shattered expectations and made history as the first woman to lead a dental school in the United States, returning to Howard University to serve as the College of Dentistry's dean. As dean she sparked transformative changes and launched pioneering programs that propelled the college's mission forward, such as adolescent dentistry and academic-community partnerships. Driven by her remarkable expertise and a deep commitment to strong leadership at Howard, Sinkford stepped into the role at a time when women were rare in dentistry. Her trailblazing appointment broke gender barriers and inspired generations of future female leaders.

The world was changing in 1975, a year celebrated as International Women's Year, yet only 12 percent of dentists were women. Sinkford turned down offers from Stony Brook University and the University of Washington, choosing instead to lead Howard, a decision that shaped both her life and her family's/ She saw that Howard needed her vision most. Under her leadership, the college launched innovative programs in academic and community partnerships, dental auxiliary utilization, care for chronically ill and elderly patients, infection control, implant research, faculty development, and efforts to recruit and support underrepresented minorities. By the time Sinkford retired, the dental college's academic progra had earned full accreditation from the Commission on Dental Accreditation.
