= De'Montmorency College of Dentistry =

College in Lahore, Punjab, Pakistan

de'Montmorency College of Dentistry
- Type: Public
- Established: 1928
- Affiliations: Pakistan Medical and Dental Council University of Health Sciences, Lahore
- Principal: Prof. Nabeela Riaz
- Academic staff: N/A
- Students: 110
- Location: Lahore, Punjab, Pakistan
- Website: https://demontmorency.edu.pk/

de'Montmorency College of Dentistry (DCD) is a dental school located in Lahore, Punjab, Pakistan. It is situated next to the Badshahi Masjid. The college is named after former Punjab Governor Sir Geoffrey Fitzhervey de'Montmorency, who remained in office until the start of the 1930s.

Vimla Sood, the first woman to become a dentist in undivided India, graduated from the college in 1944.

It has been the highest merit college upon enrolment of new students consistently for years. Each year it enrols a hundred students in its 4 year BDS programme. It is affiliated with the University of Health Sciences and its associated hospital is the Punjab Dental Hospital. It has many active societies, the Sports committee, the DDLS (de'Montmorency debating and literary society), the DDMS (de'Montmorency dramatics and music society). The Sports Committee acts as the Student Council body of the college. Prof. Dr. Nabeela Riaz Mirza is the current principal of the college.

Every year the college holds a number of events, the sports week besides annual dinner being the most significant. The annual dinner held on 28 August 2019 reunited the Pakistani music band, The Aarish, on the event.

== Notable alumni ==
- Arif Alvi, the President of Pakistan

== See also ==
- Medical school
- Pakistan Medical and Dental Council
- List of medical schools in Pakistan
  - List of medical schools in Islamabad
  - List of medical schools in Punjab, Pakistan
  - List of medical schools in Sindh
  - List of medical schools in Balochistan
  - List of medical schools in Khyber Pakhtunkhwa
  - List of medical schools in Azad Kashmir
  - List of medical schools in Gilgit-Baltistan
