= Muthoni Gitata =

Kenyan Dentist

Muthoni Gitata is a Kenyan dentist and the first African female dentist and oral surgeon .

== Education ==
Muthoni joined Thogoto Primary School and later joined Kikuyu Girls’ Intermediate Boarding School. She joined as an undergraduate at Annhurst College in 1976, majoring in Biology, and studied Virology for her master's at Temple University. She later obtained a Doctor of Dental Surgery degree from the School of Dentistry in 1973 at Meharry Medical College .

== Career ==
Her first job was at Kenyatta National Hospital’s Dental Unit. Muthoni also founded Gitata Gentle Family Dentistry Ltd, which is still operational in Nairobi.

== Personal life ==
Gitata is a single mother of three(3) biological children and five(5) other children that she raised. One of her daughters is called Wangeci Gitata Kiriga.
