= Mary Haviland Stilwell Kuesel =

Pioneer American dentist

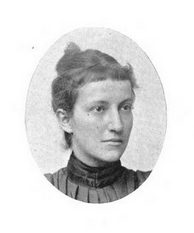
- Dr. Mary H. Stilwell
- Born: Mary Haviland Stilwell; April 30, 1866; Philadelphia, Pennsylvania
- Died: June 22, 1936 (aged 70); Philadelphia, Pennsylvania
- Occupation: Dentist
- Known for: Founded the Women's Dental Association of the U.S.
- Spouse: George C. Kuesel

Mary Haviland Stilwell Kuesel sometimes spelled Stillwell-Kuesel (April 30, 1866 – June 22, 1936) was a pioneer American dentist. She was the founder of the Women's Dental Association of the United States, which she founded in 1892 with 12 charter members.

== Biography ==
Mary Haviland Stilwell was born April 30, 1866, in Philadelphia, Pennsylvania. In 1892, she founded the Women's Dental Association of the U.S. with 12 charter members.

In 1902, she married Dr. George C. Kuesel, a medical doctor. They were associate members of the Fairmount Park Art Association. She died June 22, 1936, in Philadelphia of coronary thrombosis. Her correspondence is held in a collection by the Historical Society of Pennsylvania.

== See also ==
- Women in dentistry in the United States
