= Gerry Curatola =

American cosmetic dentist

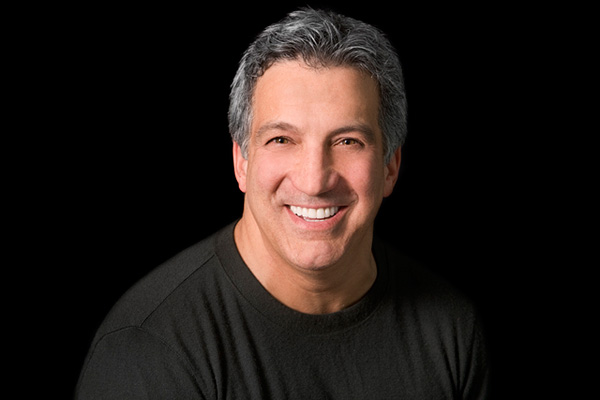
- Born: Gerald Curatola; New York, New York, United States
- Occupations: Dentist, Media Personality
- Spouse: Georgia Curatola
- Website: http://www.rejuvdentist.com/

Gerald Peter Curatola, D.D.S. is a dentist, Adjunct Clinical Associate Professor at New York University, known for his contributions in cosmetic dentistry. He is a dental contributor to Fox News Channel, and Dr. Oz, and has appeared on the Martha Stewart Show,

== Early life and education ==
Curatola attended Chaminade High School in Mineola, New York, a private boys' Catholic preparatory school. He went on to Colgate University in Hamilton, New York, graduating in 1979. Curatola began dental school in the Fall of 1979 at New York University College of Dentistry and served as President of his dental school class until becoming the NYUCD Student Body President in his last year until his graduation in 1983.

Curatola has been a member of the teaching faculty at NYU since 1984 serving as a Clinical Instructor in Dental Materials and presently, Adjunct Clinical Associate Professor in the Department of Cariology and Comprehensive Care.

== Early career ==
In 1982, while in dental school Curatola organized a dental mission to the island of Jamaica in conjunction with the Ministry of Health in the Jamaican Government and the U.S. Peace Corps, whose facilities were used on the island to provide dental care in critically under-served areas for three months. His work there earned him recognition and a citation from the Jamaican Government.

By 1985, his cosmetic dentistry work was published in the New York State Dental Journal and garnered the attention of the DenMat Corporation in Santa Maria, CA who hired him as a national lecturing clinician.

In 1995, Curatola continued his education in natural medicine, attending Harvard University's Symposiums in Complementary and Alternative Medicine under the direction of David Eisenberg, the founder of Harvard Medical School's Center for Alternative Medicine Research and Education (now the Division for Research and Education in Complementary and Integrative Medical Therapies of Harvard's Osher Research Center).

=== Rejuvenation Dentistry ===
Curatola founded Rejuvenation Dentistry in 2005. There are Rejuvenation Dentistry affiliates in five cities: New York, London, Paris, Rome and East Hampton.

=== Revitin ===
Curatola invented Revitin, a prebiotic naturopathic toothpaste.

== Humanitarian service and contributions ==
Locally, Curatola helped to establish the Pediatric Dental Fund of the Hamptons, a dental charity founded by local pediatrician, Gail Schoenfeld, which provides free dental care to children on Long Island's East End. He contributes and provides pro bono dental services to local charitable organizations including The Retreat, a shelter for victims of domestic violence.

== Personal life ==
Curatola served on the Board of Trustees of Ross School in East Hampton for seven years, retiring in 2010.

== Media coverage ==
Curatola has contributed to numerous television and radio programs including The Dr. Oz Show, The Martha Stewart Show, ABC News, Fox News, NBC, CBS, and CNN. Curatola and Rejuvenation Dentistry have been featured in the New York Post.

== Honors and awards ==
- Curatola Wing For Clinical Research established at [New York University], November, 2006
