= W. J. Younger =

American dentist and researcher

William John Younger (1838-1920) was an American dentist who performed some of the earliest and most groundbreaking research in the field of periodontology.

== Work in the field of periodontology ==
Younger was a follower of John W. Riggs, the first American periodontist. In 1893, he was the first to consider periodontal disease an infection and was the first to discuss the possibility of "periodontal reattachment," a process in which gingival graft tissue could be removed from one site in the mouth and properly reattached to the alveolar bone.

in 1902, Younger reported the first gingival graft, in which he removed tissue "from behind the third molar" and reattached it near the canine tooth, claiming the surgery to have been a success. In the same report he first described the use of a membrane for periodontal regeneration.

Younger practiced for some time in San Francisco, California.
