= Ontario Dental Association =

Canadian professional association

- Formation: 1867
- Headquarters: 4 New Street; Toronto, Ontario; M5R 1P6
- Coordinates: 43.674469°N 79.393525°W
- Official language: english/french
- President/Chair of the Board: Dr. David Brown
- President-Elect: Dr. Janet Leith
- Vice-President: Dr. Jonathan Mayer
- Chief Executive Officer: Mr. Frank Bevilacqua
- Staff: <100
- Volunteers: 400+
- Website: www.oda.ca

The Ontario Dental Association is the largest dental association in Canada, representing the dentist of the province of Ontario. It has over 11,000 members, and represents the interests of its members through a variety of initiatives. Including numerous avenues of advocacy including national, provincial and municipal governments. It also works with members and the public with a variety of oral health issues.

A separate organization, the Royal College of Dental Surgeons of Ontario, regulates the dental profession in Ontario.

== History ==
It was founded by Dr. Barnabas Day in 1867. The first woman member was Caroline Louise Josephine Wells, who joined in 1893.
