= Josephine Serre =

Estonia dentist

Josephine Serre (fl. 1814) was the first female dentist in Estonia.

In 1814, she became the first woman to receive a dentistry degree from the University of Tartu. Her daughter Marie-Louis Serre later graduated with a dentistry degree in 1829 from the same university.
