= Vimla Sood =

Indian dentist (1922–2021)

Vimla Sood (1922 – 1 August 2021) was the third woman to become a dentist in Undivided India. She graduated from the De'Montmorency College of Dentistry in 1944.

== Education ==
Sood was the only woman out of 30 students in her class at the DeMontmorency College of Dentistry in Lahore. She graduated University of the Punjab in 1944. Her family were all doctors, and encouraged her to become a dentist. She moved to New York for an internship and travelled America, completing a master's degree in Pediatric Dentistry in 1955 at the University of Minnesota. After partition, Sood moved to Chandigarh.

== Career and later life ==
Sood worked in Wellingdon Hospital (now Ram Manohar Lohia), where she used to visit villages in a mobile van. She later joined Jawaharlal Institute of Postgraduate Medical Education and Research.

In November 2016 she arranged a White Coat Ceremony for dental college students swearing their professional oath.

Sood died on 1 August 2021, at the age of 99.

== Recognition and awards ==
Sood was recognised by the Indian Dental Association as senior respected faculty; she was honored by IDA Chandigarh on Teachers Day, 5 September 2020. She was also recognized by the faculty of Dr. Harvansh Singh Judge Institute of Dental Sciences & Hospital and her life was celebrated with a video. at the event.
