= Simi Johnson =

Nigerian dentist and activist

- Born: 1927; Lagos Island
- Citizenship: Nigeria
- Occupation: Dentist
- Parents: Alfred Latunde (father); Harriet Susan Johnson (mother)

Simisola Olayemi Onibuwe Johnson, (1929 – 2000) was the first Nigeria woman to qualify as a Nigerian dentist and women's advocate who was the Minister for Social Development and Culture during the nation's second republic. Johnson and Grace Guobadia were both qualified as dentists in 1957, making them the first trained female dentists in Nigeria. She was also a chair of Allied Bank and the Lagos State branch of the National Council of Women Societies, and also a fellow of the National Postgraduate Medical College of Nigeria.

== Life ==
Johnson was born in Lagos Island, to the family of Alfred Latunde and Harriet Susan Johnson (née Crowther Nichol). She was the last born of her parents. Her father was a lawyer and a founding director of the National Bank of Nigeria in 1933, her maternal great-great-grandfather was Ajayi Crowther, while her great-grand-uncle was Herbert Macaulay. Johnson was educated at CMS Girls' School Lagos. From 1954 to 1957, she attended Sunderland Technical College and Durham University qualifying as a dentist. She and fellow Nigerian, Grace Guobadia, graduated in the same year, becoming the first two trained female dentists in the country. Johnson earned a Bachelor of Dental Surgery degree and Guobadia, a Licentiate in Dental Surgery. Johnson later attended the Royal College of Surgeons, Glasgow to become an orthodontist. In the process, she became Nigeria's first female women's development, a committee given the mandate to establish a working relationship between the government and other women's organizations in the country. After the Shagari administration, Johnson continued to play an advisory role in gender affairs. In 1985, she was head of Nigeria's delegation to the Third World Conference on Women, held in Nairobi, Kenya. Part of the recommendations of the conference was for member nations to eliminate discrimination against women and adopt strategies that will include the participation of women in an effort to promote development. Johnson was the head of the women's advisory committee, charged to make recommendations to Babangida's administration about strategies to increase women's participation in government. The committee among other things recommended the creation of a Ministry for Women's Affairs. The ministry did not come into being until 1989 with the establishment of the National Commission for Women supported by Maryam Babangida.

== Sources ==
- Para-Mallam, Oluwafunmilayo (April 2006). "The National Policy on Women and the Challenges of Mainstreaming Gender Issues in Nigeria, 1985 — 2005" (PDF).
- Petsalis, Sophia (1990). The silent power : a portrait of Nigerian women. Montreal: Meridian Press.
- Ogunbodede, Eyitope (2013). "Historical Perspectives: Dr. Simisola Olayemi Onibuwe Johnson and Her Contributions to Dentistry and National Development" (PDF). West African Journal of Orthodontics (2): 30–32.
