= Alfred Fones =

American dentist (1869–1938)

Alfred Civilion Fones
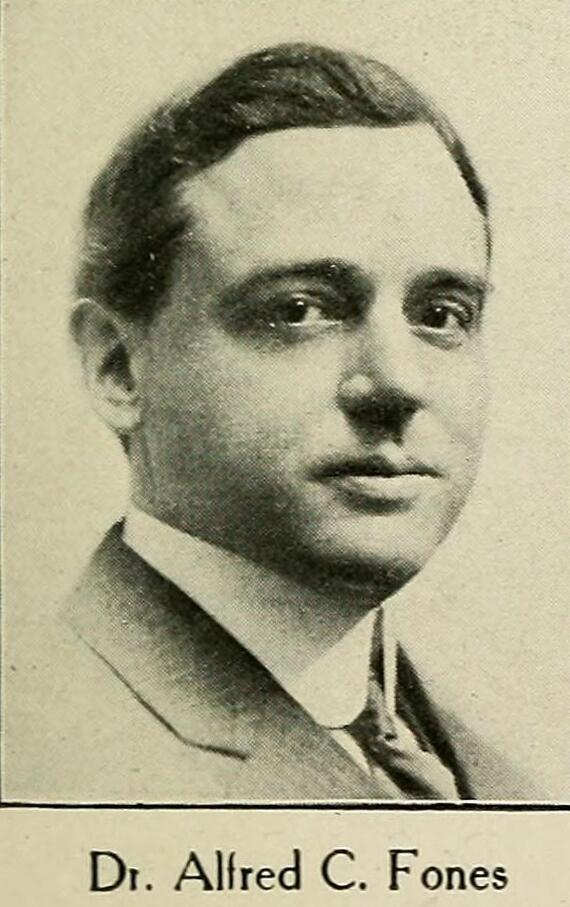
- Alfred C. Fones
- Born: 1869; Bridgeport
- Died: March 15, 1938 (aged 68–69)
- Education: New York College of Dentistry
- Occupation: Dentist
- Parent: Civilion Fones

Alfred Civilion Fones (1869 – March 15, 1938) was an American dentist from Bridgeport, Connecticut, who has been called the founder of the profession of dental hygiene, starting in 1906. Fones created the name "dental hygienist" and in 1913 established the first school of dental hygiene. Fone's father was mayor of Bridgeport from 1886 to 1888 and was also a practicing dentist, becoming the first "dental commissioner" for the City of Bridgeport. Alfred Fones graduated from the New York College of Dentistry in 1890.

== Founding dental hygienist profession ==
In 1906 he trained his chairside assistant (and his cousin), Irene M. Newman, to clean teeth and perform other preventive treatments on children, making her the world's first dental hygienist. Newman's training consisted in large part in learning to clean teeth under Fones' guidance. For teaching aids, Fones took the many extracted teeth from his practice, mounted them in a modeling compound and painted plaster of Paris around the neck of each tooth to represent calculus and stains. Newman started performing oral prophylaxis for the public in 1907. (She later received the world’s first license as a dental hygienist in Connecticut in 1917, and she became the first president of the Connecticut Dental Hygienists Association; she died November 15, 1958, at the age of 83.)

Fones once said: "It is primarily to this important work of public education that the dental hygienist is called. She must regard herself as the channel through which dentistry’s knowledge of mouth hygiene is to be disseminated the greatest service she can perform is the persistent education of the public in mouth hygiene and the allied branches of general hygiene."

== Fones School of Dental Hygiene ==
Newman's training seemed to help the children, so Fones launched a program to make preventive dental treatment available to schoolchildren in Bridgeport. In 1913 he established a school for dental hygienists, convincing the Bridgeport board of education to help fund the program. Although he envisioned dental hygienists in doctors' offices, his primary goal was to have them work in schools. Fones raised a total of $46,000 to open the school, which had a first class of 34 women, many of them "mature" women who were school teachers, nurses or doctors' wives.

The first classes of the "Fones Clinic For Dental Hygienists" were held in a garage behind Fones' office in a carriage house at 10 Washington Avenue in Bridgeport. Despite the humble location, the school's faculty included the deans of the dental schools of Pennsylvania and Harvard, seven professors from Yale and two from Columbia, along with other noted practitioners from the United States and beyond. Local dentists and professionals from Japan were among the instructors. In June 1915, a total of 27 students graduated from the first class. Many graduates went on to jobs with the Bridgeport school district, where they played a major part in reducing dental caries in students by 75 percent.

Some years later, Fones suspended operation of the school so that he could devote more time to traveling and lecturing on dental hygiene. Eleven years after his death (on March 15, 1938), in 1949, dental professionals and the Junior College of Connecticut (of which Dr. Fones had been a trustee) reopened the Fones School of Dental Hygiene.

The Fones School of Dental Hygiene is now located at the University of Bridgeport. As of 2007 education in the field has expanded, with more than 200 dental hygiene schools and 120,000 registered dental hygienists in the United States alone.

== Namesake awards ==
The American Dental Hygienists' Association, founded in 1923, bestows the Alfred Fones Award to recognize outstanding achievement and dedication to the dental hygiene profession. The Connecticut Dental Association also has an Alfred Fones Award.
