= Jessica Rickert =

First Native American dentist

Jessica Ann Rickert
- Born: Michigan
- Education: University of Michigan School of Dentistry
- Occupation: Dentist
- Known for: Being the first female American Indian dentist in America

Jessica Ann Rickert (born 1950) is an American dentist. She became the first female American Indian dentist in America upon graduating with a DDS from the University of Michigan School of Dentistry in 1975. She was one of only six women in a class of 140 students. She is a member of the Prairie Band Potawatomi Nation, and a direct descendant of the Indian chief Wahbememe (Whitepigeon).

== Early life and education ==
Rickert grew up in Wyoming, Michigan. She graduated high school in 1968. Initially dismissed by her high school guidance counselor when she said she wanted to study medicine, Rickert went on to attend the University of Michigan for her undergraduate degree and her Doctor of Dental Surgery (DDS) degree.

== Career ==
In the 1980s, Rickert learned from George Blue Spruce, the first American Indian dentist in the United States and Assistant Surgeon General, that she was the first female American Indian dentist. Additionally, she is also a founder of the Society of American Indian Dentists, which was founded in 1990, as well as the Native American Student Association. She encourages American Indians and other underrepresented students to consider dentistry and has worked with the Grand Traverse Band of Ottawa and Chippewa Indians and the Saginaw Chippewa tribes for education and dental services.

== Honors ==
Rickert received the American Dental Association's Access Recognition Award in 2005 for her dental advice column featured in American Indian newspapers.

She was inducted into the Michigan Women's Hall of Fame in 2009.

In 2022, she received the American Dental Education Association’s William J. Gies Award for Achievement.
