= Caroline Louise Josephine Wells =

First professional female dentist in Ontario, Canada

- Josephine Wells in 1893
- Born: Caroline Louise Josephine Irwin; August 1856
- Died: 17 March 1939 (aged 82)
- Occupation: Dentist

Caroline Louise Josephine Wells (August 1856 – 17 March 1939) was the first professionally qualified female dentist in Ontario, Canada. She was also the first person to provide dental services in mental hospitals in Ontario, and towards the end of her career worked exclusively in these institutions.

== Background ==
Dr. Barnabas Day organized the Dental Association of Ontario (ODA) in 1867. In 1868 the ODA lobbied the Ontario government to pass the Act Respecting Dentistry, by which the dentists must be licensed in order to practice. This aimed to end tooth pulling by untrained fly-by-night charlatans. The Royal College of Dental Surgeons of Ontario (RCDSO) was formed by ODA members to act as the governing body. In 1869 the RCDSO opened the first dental school in Canada. The first scientific meeting of the ODA was held in 1889 in London, Ontario. By the 1890s enforcement of strict compliance with the ODA code of ethics had almost eliminated false advertising by Ontario dentists. Dentistry had become a respectable occupation in Ontario.

== Life ==
Caroline Louise Josephine Irwin was born in August 1856, daughter of Charles Irwin and Catherine Tyson. On 9 March 1877, she married John Wells, a dentist. They had three children. Her husband graduated from dental school as a gold medalist in 1882 but became ill. Relatives took care of the three children while Caroline studied dentistry. In 1893 C. L. Josephine Wells became the first woman to graduate from the Royal College of Dental Surgeons, which made her the first Canadian woman to graduate from a dental school. She was also the first female member of the Ontario Dental Society, as it was then called. With the support of her friends Josephine Wells attended Trinity College of the University of Toronto and received her doctorate in 1899.

Josephine Wells practiced as a dentist in Toronto for 36 years. She also provided dental services at the Andrew Mercer Reformatory for Women and at mental hospitals in Toronto, Hamilton and Orillia. Daniel Clark, superintendent at the Toronto Hospital for the Insane from 1875 to 1905, began to employ a dentist for paying patients in 1898, and asked for money to also be provided to treat free patients. He saw that better dental care would improve diet and help the inmate's physical and mental wellbeing. Clark employed Josephine Wells in the early years of this program. She was the first person to provide dental services in the mental hospitals of Ontario. In the ten years before she retired she practiced exclusively in mental hospitals.

Josephine Wells died on 17 March 1939. She is buried in Aurora Cemetery, Aurora, Ontario. She was followed by other female dentists, breaking the male monopoly of this profession in Ontario. The youngest of her children was the Honourable Dalton C. Wells, who became Chief Justice of the High Court of Ontario in 1966.

== Sources ==
- Bulletin of the History of Dentistry, American Academy of the History of Dentistry., 1975
- Caroline Louise Josephine Wells, RCDSO: Royal College of Dental Surgeons of Ontario, archived from the original on 2018-02-21
- Gullett, Donald W. (1971-12-15), A History of Dentistry in Canada, University of Toronto Press, Scholarly Publishing Division, ISBN 978-1-4875-9808-2
- History, Mission & Vision, ODA: Ontario Dental Association, archived from the original on 2013-12-03
- McCormick, Carol (19 July 2016), "Josephine Wells", Find A Grave, 167177921
- Monroe, Dawn E., "1890s: Caroline Louise Josephine Wells. Dentist", Famous Canadian Women
- ODA's First Female Dentist (1893), ODA: Ontario Dental Association
- Reaume, Geoffrey (2000), Remembrance of Patients Past: Patient Life at the Toronto Hospital for the Insane, 1870-1940, University of Toronto Press, ISBN 978-0-19-541538-4
- Tomkins, Dr. Lynn (2017), "ODA Celebrates 150 Years of Leading Oral Health", CDA Essentials (1)
