= Emeline Roberts Jones =

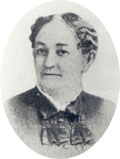
Emeline Roberts Jones

Emeline Roberts Jones (1836–1916) was the first woman to practice dentistry in the United States.

She married the dentist Daniel Jones when she was a teenager (at age 18) but she did not become his assistant until 1855. Her husband believed that dentistry was not a suitable career for a woman. He thought the “frail and clumsy fingers” of women made them poor dentists. However, she studied in secret and after Emeline showed him a two-quart jar of several hundred of his extracted teeth she had secretly filled he allowed her to assist him.

After her husband's death in 1864 she continued to practice dentistry by herself, in eastern Connecticut and Rhode Island. She often traveled with a portable dentistry chair. From 1876 until her retirement in 1915 she had her own practice in New Haven, Connecticut. It was one of the largest and most lucrative practices in Connecticut. She had two children, a son and a daughter.

Emeline served on the Woman’s Advisory Council of the World’s Columbian Dental Congress in 1893. In 1912 she was elected to an honorary membership in the Connecticut State Dental Society, and in 1914 she was elected to an honorary membership in the National Dental Association. She died in 1916 at age 80. In 1994 she was posthumously inducted into the Connecticut Women's Hall of Fame.

== See also ==
- Women in dentistry in the United States
