= Faith Sai So Leong =

Chinese-born American dentist (1880–1929)

Faith Sai So Leong (蔡世良)
- Born: 1880; China
- Died: May 1, 1929 (aged 48–49)
- Education: College of Physicians and Surgeons
- Scientific career
- Fields: Dentistry

Faith Sai So Leong (蔡世良) (1880-1929), also called Sai So Yeong, was the first Chinese American woman to graduate from a school of dentistry and become a dentist in the United States.

== Life ==
Born in China, and adopted as Sai So Yeong by Mrs. E J Nickerson, an English teacher, in San Francisco at age 13, Faith was encouraged to pursue dentistry by a cousin who was also a dentist. She was 24 years old when she became the first woman to graduate from the College of Physicians and Surgeons (now the University of the Pacific Arthur A. Dugoni School of Dentistry) in 1904.

== Career ==
She was awarded the Doctor of Dental Surgery in 1905 from the College of Physicians and Surgeons, San Francisco, May 18, 1905 at the Alhambra Theater, San Francisco. Following a trial of the State Board of Dental Examiners, which delayed the awarding of licenses, Sai So was one of approximately 40 students granted a dental license in August 1905. Her primary clientele included the Chinese-American community in San Francisco until 1906. She moved to Oakland after the 1906 San Francisco earthquake and fire destroyed her office, and established a thriving business for several years before returning to San Francisco. She was struck and killed by a car in 1929.
