= Hedvig Bensow =

Finnish dentist (1858–1894)

Hedvig Eleonora Ståhlberg, mostly known as Hedvig Bensow (1858–1894) was the first female dentist in Finland. (Anna Robina (Robbi) Karvonen became the first female dentist to study and earn a dental degree in Finland, when she took her exam in 1895.)

Ståhlberg was born in Sweden to the Swedish dentist S. C. Bensow. She had an interest in her father's profession, and was an assistant to her father from an early age. She studied dentistry in Russia and took her exam from the St. Petersburg Academy of Military Medicine on 13 May 1887. She settled in Finland, where she became Finland's first female dentist. She had her practice in both Vyborg and Helsinki, and was appreciated for her work ethics and her work among the poor. She made several study trips abroad. She married the lawyer Oskar August Ståhlberg in 1893.
