= Petra Lie =

Norwegian dentist

Petra Lie (1848-1907) was a Norwegian dentist. She was the first female dentist in Norway.

She took her dentist degree in 1872 as the first woman in her country. She had a successful practice in Oslo and was the first Norwegian dentist to use a drilling machine.
