= Ida Gray =

First African-American dentist in USA

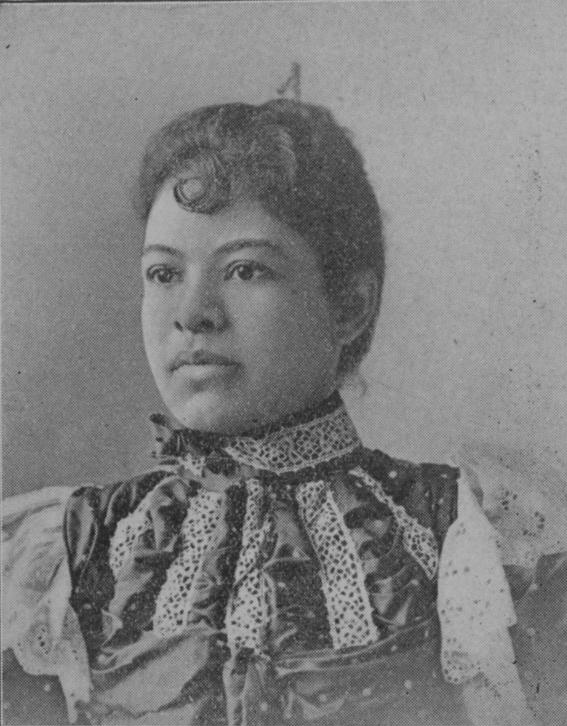
- Ida Gray Nelson, 1900
- Born: March 4, 1867; Clarksville, Montgomery County, Tennessee
- Died: May 3, 1953 (aged 86); Chicago, Cook County, Illinois
- Other names: Ida Gray Nelson, Ida Rollins
- Education: University of Michigan
- Occupation: Dentist
- Years active: 1875–1928
- Known for: first African-American dentist in the United States

Ida Gray (also known as Ida Gray Nelson and Ida Rollins; March 4, 1867 – May 3, 1953) was the first African-American woman to become a dentist in the United States.

At a very young age she became an orphan when her parents died. Later in her life she became interested in dentistry when she went to work in the offices of Jonathan Taft, an early advocate for women to learn dentistry. After her apprenticeship in his office, Gray was able to pass the entrance examinations and then attended the University of Michigan School of Dentistry. When she graduated, it was widely published that she was the first African-American dentist in the United States and she was promoted as a role model for women to follow. Gray practiced in Ohio before settling in Chicago, where she remained until her death. She practiced for more than thirty years.

== Early life ==
Ida Gray was born on March 4, 1867, in Clarksville, Tennessee. She was an infant when her teenage mother Jenny Gray died. Her father, a white man, had no part in raising her when her mother died. Gray was sent to live with her aunt, Caroline Gray, in Cincinnati, Ohio. She, along with Caroline's three children – Howard, Susan, and Mary – attended the segregated public schools. Though she worked from an early age as a seamstress, Gray persevered with her schooling and graduated from Gaines High School in 1887.

== Career ==
During her schooling, Gray began working in the offices of William and Jonathan Taft, who were advocates of women being trained as dentists. He had been the dean of the Ohio College of Dentistry and was recruited by the University of Michigan to help found their first dental school. When he left Ohio to take up the post, Taft kept an office with William Taft in Cincinnati. Gray worked in the office for approximately three years, learning enough to pass the entrance examinations for the University of Michigan School of Dentistry, which she entered on October 1, 1887. Gray graduated in June 1890, becoming the first African-American woman dentist in the United States.

Gray's accomplishment was widely published and she opened an office at 216 Ninth Street in Cincinnati. In her practice, she serviced both white and black patients and was repeatedly cited in black media as a role model for other women. In 1895, she relocated her practice to Chicago, after marrying James Sanford Nelson in March of that year. He was a naturalized American citizen, originally from Canada, who was a lawyer, captain, and quartermaster for the Illinois National Guard. He later worked for many years as an accountant for the city of Chicago.

As she had in Cincinnati, Nelson served both black and white clientele, as well as both adults and children, though her reputation was for her gentleness with children. She inspired one of her patients, Olive M. Henderson, to become the second black woman dentist in Chicago. Though her office relocated several times, Nelson continued to practice until her retirement in 1928. In 1929, Nelson, whose first husband James had died in 1926, married William A. Rollins.

In addition to her dentistry, Nelson was involved in several clubs and her social activities were widely reported in the black press. She served as vice president of the Professional Women's Club of Chicago, vice president of the Eighth Regiment Ladies' Auxiliary and was a member of the Phyllis Wheatley Club, a group organized to maintain the only black women's shelter in Chicago.

== Death and legacy ==
Ida Rollins died on May 3, 1953, in Chicago. Although she was married, she never had children. An annual award given in her name, the Ida Gray Award, was established by the School of Dentistry at the University of Michigan. Though no comprehensive work has been done on a biography of Gray Nelson Rollins, she is often cited in works as "an example of achievement and inspiration for others to follow". Her gravestone reads: "Dr. Ida Gray Nelson Rollins, 1st Negro Woman Dentist in America".
