= Madeleine-Françoise Calais =

French dentist

Madeleine-Françoise Calais (1713 or 1714 - fl. 1740) was a French dentist, and the first female dentist to obtain a license as a master dentist from the Surgical Society of Paris.

== Life ==
She was a native of Paris, France. In 1737, when she was twenty-three years old, she was accepted as a student of the dentist Claude Jacquier de Géraudly of Paris. She graduated in 1740.

=== Career ===
In 1740, she wished to practice independently as a dentist and consequently applied for a license as a master dentist from the Surgical Society of Paris when she was twenty-seven years old. She duly passed all required tests of knowledge. She also had good recommendations from her patients. However, the Surgical Society was hesitant to issue a license to practice dentistry. While, in theory, women were not forbidden to practice dentistry, a license had never been issued to a woman before.

The Surgical Society, therefore, consulted Guillaume-François Joly de Fleury of the Paris Parlement. One of the members of Parliament, Pelletier, supported her request, as did Gabriel Bachelier, valet de chambre to the king, Louis XV. The royal surgeon of the king, François Gigot de la Peyronie, initially opposed the request in a letter of 21 October 1740. However, la Peyronie reconsidered and eventually recommended that her request be granted because few professions were legal for women, and hard-working and intelligent women must be given some legal opportunity to support themselves.

Her request was therefore granted in 1740, and she was allowed to open her dental practice. She is noted to have had some success, particularly among women.

She has been referred to as the first female dentist in France, though there are examples of other female healers in 18th-century France. A Mademoiselle de Rezé published a short treatise on a balm to treat toothache, gingival ulcerations, gout and skin eye conditions in 1719 (second edition 1722), a few years before "Le Chirugien Dentiste" by Pierre Fauchard in 1728. However, the profession of dentistry did not become a regulated medical profession until the 19th century.
