= Polonia Sanz y Ferrer =

Spanish orthodontist and photographer

Polonia Sanz y Ferrer (died 1892) was a Spanish dentist, the first qualified woman to practice dentistry in Spain.

On 10 April 1849 she was issued a license by the Academy of Medicine and Surgery in Valencia, which was confirmed after an examination on 20 December 1849, to practice dentistry, such as "clean teeth, remove teeth [...] and other operations practiced by dentists". She was met with great resistance from male colleagues, and was forced to defend herself in public. Among her clients were the Moroccan prince Muley el Abbas. She was not able to achieve her ambition to be appointed honorary dentist to the Spanish court. She also published a work about dentistry.

She was one of the first women in the modern world to be issued a dentist license. Her predecessor María Rajoó, who practiced as a dentist in Madrid in 1800–1830, was not licensed as she was. Her license was however only to practice dentistry, since the profession of dentistry was not a medical profession in Spain until 1875. Francisca García became the first woman in Spain to be granted the title of dentist, and Clara V. Rosas became the first female dentist in Spain with a degree in dentistry in 1908.
