= Minnie Evangeline Jordon =

American dentist

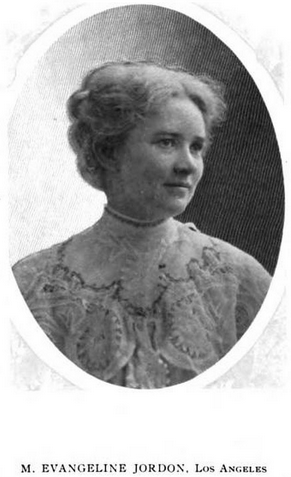
Minnie Evangeline Jordon, from a 1910 publication.

Minnie Evangeline Jordon (June 22, 1865 – October 10, 1952) was an American dentist, and the first dentist in the United States to specialize in pediatric dentistry.

== Early life ==
Minnie Evangeline Jordon was born in Fulton County, Illinois, the daughter of Eugene B. Jordon and Catherine Rebecca Calvert Jordon. She moved to California in 1887 and graduated from the Los Angeles State Normal School in 1891. She went on to graduate from the University of California's dental program in 1898. While she was in dental school, she ran an oral health clinic at an orphanage in San Francisco.

== Career ==
Jordon taught elementary school and worked as a dental assistant while she was training to be a dentist in Berkeley, then opened her own dental practice in Los Angeles. At first she had a general practice; in 1909, she established the first dental practice in the United States devoted only to pediatric patients. In 1916 she gave a lecture to the Los Angeles County Nurses' Association on "The Relation of the Teeth to the Development of the Child". She presented a paper, "Relation of Food to the Developing Teeth", at the 1921 meeting of the California State Dental Association, recommending fewer sweets and more milk, coarse grains, eggs, and vegetables in children's diets. As a "pioneer in pedodontics" she published the first textbook on the subject in 1925, titled Operative Dentistry for Children.

She was an associate professor of dentistry at the University of Southern California, and an officer in the Southern California Dental Association. She was a founder and first president of the Federation of American Women Dentists and a founder of the American Society of Dentistry for Children.

== Personal life ==
Minnie Evangeline Jordon died in Los Angeles in 1952, aged 87 years.
