= Margaret Caro =

New Zealand dentist and social reformer

- Born: 17 December 1848; Richmond
- Died: 19 May 1938 (aged 89); Wellington
- Occupation: Dentist

Margaret Caro (17 December 1848 – 19 May 1938) was a New Zealand dentist, social reformer, lecturer, vegetarian and writer. In 1881 she was the first woman to be listed on the Dentists' Register of New Zealand.

== Biography ==
Caro was born in Richmond, Nelson. In 1864 she married Dr J.S. Caro and they lived in the South Island. They moved to Napier in 1878 where she practiced dentistry for 25 years.

Caro joined the Seventh-day Adventist Church in 1888 after going to evangelistic meetings held by A. G. Daniells. She was converted to vegetarianism by Daniells who had preached food reform and the advantages of a vegetarian diet at Hawke's Bay Region. Caro was a former slaughterhouse inspector but became a vegetarianism activist. After 1899, she joined the Christchurch Vegetarian Society, even though she still lived in Napier.

Caro put together weekly vegetarian dinner recipes for the average working man that were published in the White Ribbon temperance magazine. In 1902, she advocated vegetarianism at the conference of the National Council of Women. Caro's son Edgar was also a vegetarian and was the editor of the New Zealand Health Journal.

Caro died in Wellington in 1938.

== Selected publications ==
- “Man’s Natural Diet” in National Council of the Women of New Zealand, 7th session (May 5–15, 1902)
- “Wholesome Food” in White Ribbon (September, 1902)
