= American Dental Education Association =

U.S.-based nonprofit organization

The American Dental Education Association (ADEA) is a non-profit organization that works to further the education of dental professionals and the advancement of academic dental programs in Canada and the United States. Founded in 1923 as the American Association of Dental Schools, ADEA is based in Washington, D.C.

The ADEA membership includes:

- all 76 U.S. and Canadian dental schools,
- over 800 allied and advanced dental education programs
- sixty-six corporations working in oral health education.
- over 20,000 faculty, staff, deans, program directors and students

== Description ==
=== History ===
Nancy Goorey became the first female president of ADEA in 1977. In 2006, ADEA instituted open membership, which increased the number of ADEA member institutions .

=== ADEA sections ===
ADEA has 38 sections: academic affairs, anatomical sciences, behavioral science, biochemistry, nutrition, and microbiology, business and financial administration, cariology, clinic administration, community and preventative dentistry, comprehensive care and general dentistry, continuing education, dental anatomy and occlusion, dental assisting education, dental hygiene education, dental informatics, dental school admissions officers, development, alumni affairs, and public relations, educational research/development and curriculum, endodontics, gay-straight alliance, gerontology and geriatrics education, graduate and postgraduate education, minority affairs, operative dentistry and biomaterials, oral biology, oral diagnosis/oral medicine, oral and maxillofacial radiology, orthodontics, pediatric dentistry, periodontics, physiology, pharmacology, and therapeutics, postdoctoral general dentistry, practice management, prosthodontics, student affairs and financial aid, and substance abuse, addiction and tobacco dependence education

ADEA has ten special interest groups: career development for the new educator, dental hygiene clinic coordinators, foreign-educated dental professionals, graduate dental hygiene education programs, implant dentistry, lasers in dentistry, professional, ethical, and legal issues in dentistry, scholarship of teaching and learning, and teaching and learning with emerging technologies.

== Programs ==
=== Dental students ===
The ADEA Division of Educational Pathways supports four application services for dental students:

- ADEA AADSAS (predoctoral programs)
- ADEA PASS (postdoctoral programs)
- ADEA CAAPID (postdoctoral programs for international dentists)
- ADEA DHCAS (dental hygiene programs)

ADEA helps students from diverse backgrounds to learn about careers in dentistry as early as elementary school with the following programs:

- ExploreHealthCareers.org,
- Summer Medical and Dental Education Program
- W.K. Kellogg/ADEA Minority Dental Faculty Development Program

=== Dental educators ===
For dental educators, the ADEA Leadership Institute and the ADEA Allied Dental Faculty Leadership Development Program cultivate leadership skills. Webinars, fellowship programs and numerous meetings (including the ADEA Annual Session & Exhibition) offer educational programming and networking.

ADEA determines best practices for dental education and encourages advancements in dental education programs and institutions. The ADEA Commission on Change and Innovation in Dental Education (ADEA CCI) has engaged representatives from each U.S. dental school specifically to examine dental school curricula.

ADEA provides financial support for dental education, research, and leadership through the Gies Foundation, named after Dr. William J. Gies. The Gies Awards for vision, innovation and achievement in oral health and dental education are distributed annually at the ADEA Annual Session & Exhibition.

== Publications ==
ADEA publishes the peer-reviewed Journal of Dental Education, the Bulletin of Dental Education, the ADEA Official Guide to Dental Schools, surveys and reports on the state of dental education and policy briefs.

== See also ==
- American Student Dental Association
