= Pediatric dentistry =

Branch of dentistry

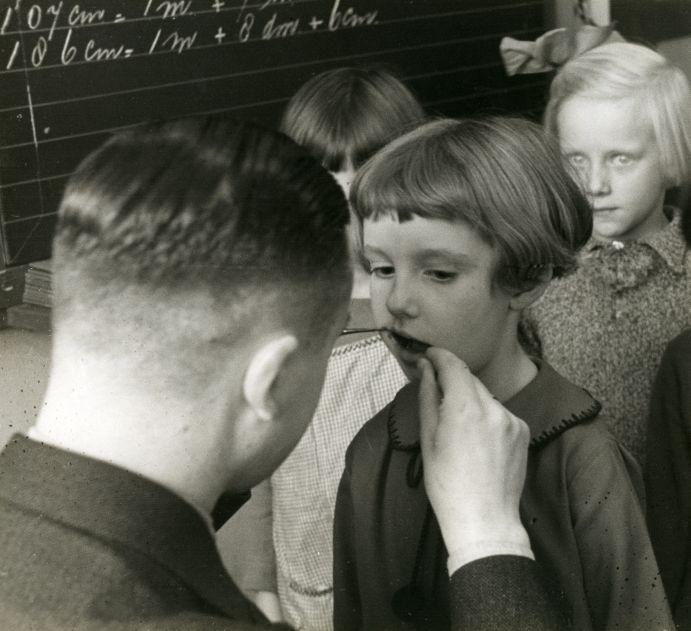
School dentist examining children's teeth. Netherlands, 1935.

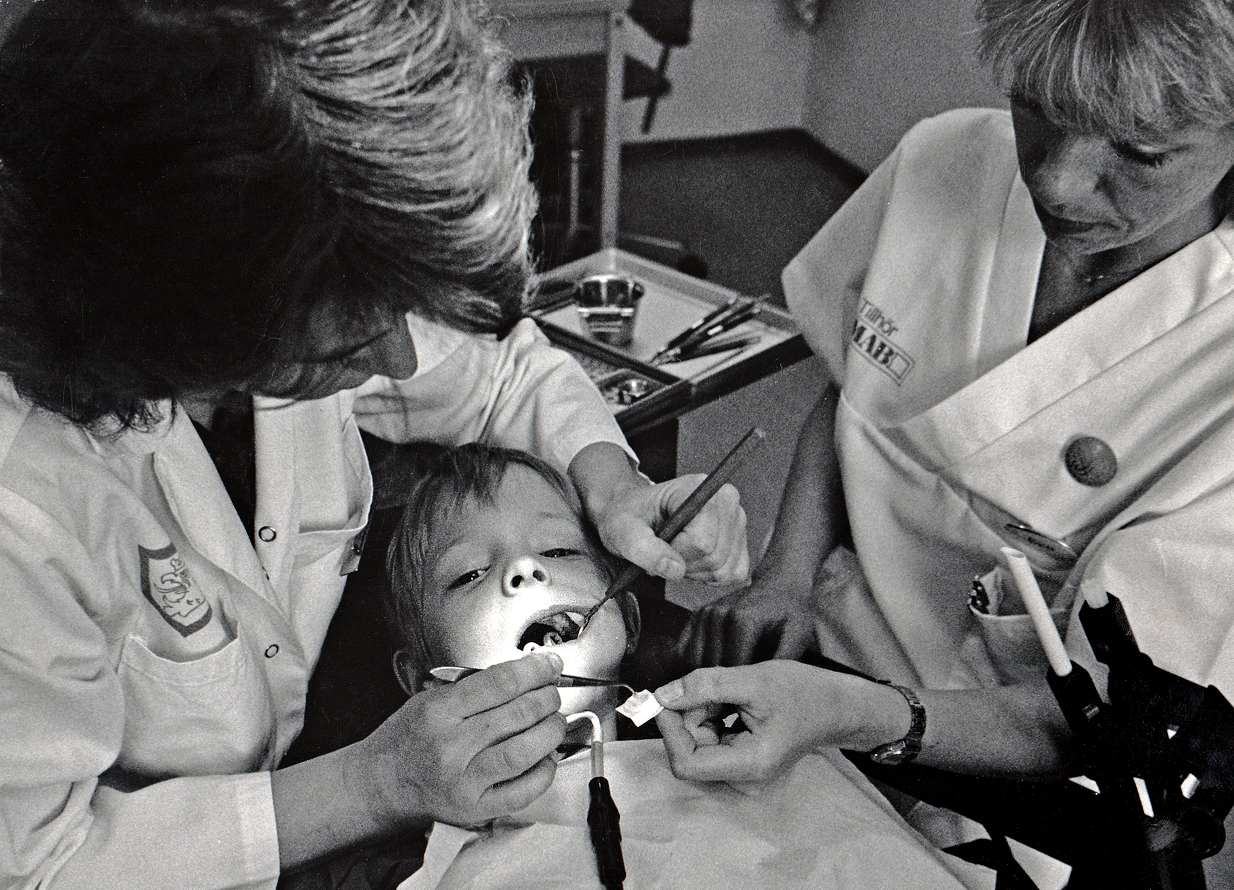
A child getting a filling at the dentist. Malmö National Dental Service 1989.

Pediatric dentistry (formerly pedodontics in American English or paedodontics in Commonwealth English) is the branch of dentistry dealing with children from birth through adolescence. The specialty of pediatric dentistry is recognized by the American Dental Association, Royal College of Dentists of Canada, and Royal Australasian College of Dental Surgeons.

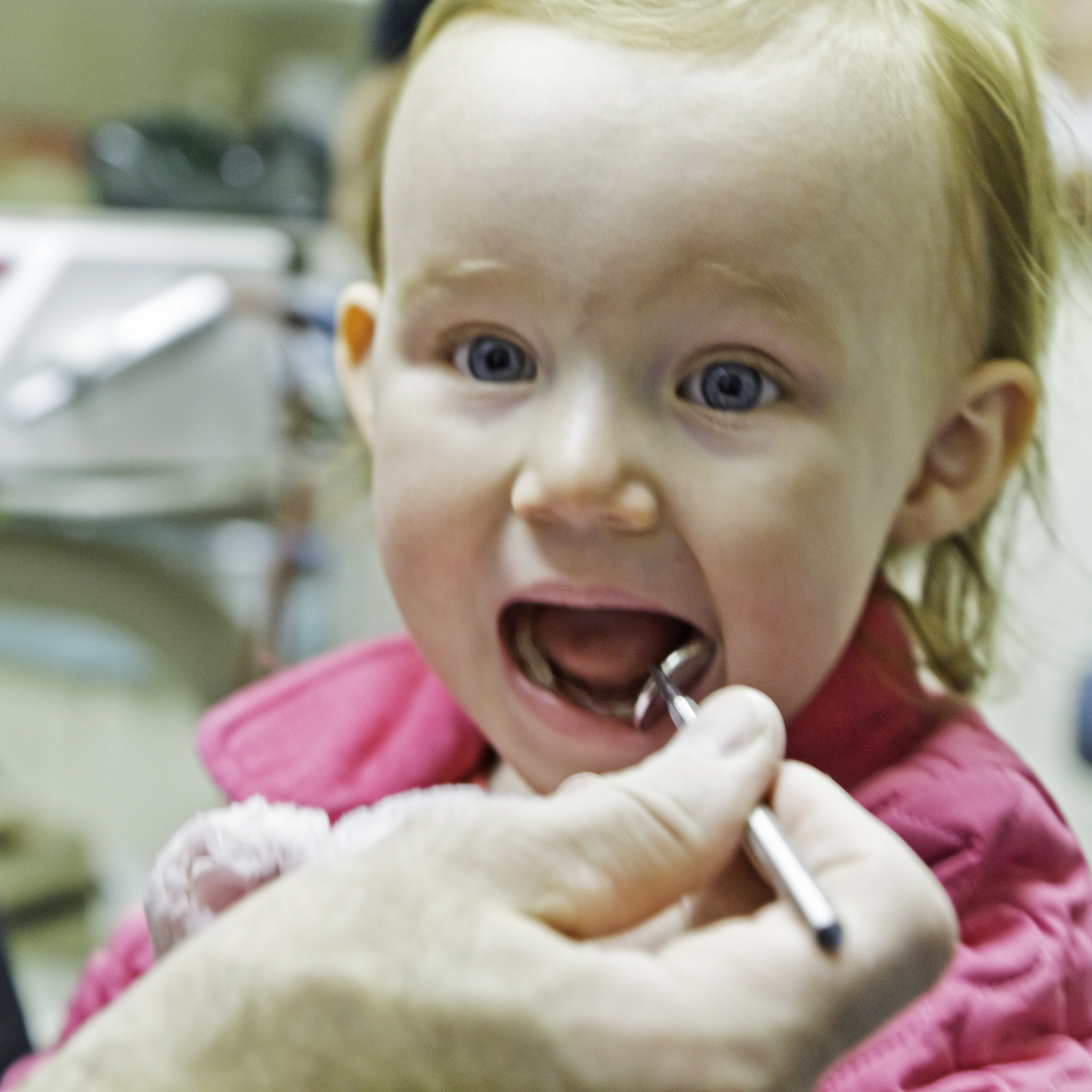
A little girl's trip to the pediatric dentist examining children's teeth.

Pediatric (also paediatric or pædiatric) dentists promote the dental health of children as well as serve as educational resources for parents. It is recommended by the American Academy of Pediatric Dentistry (AAPD) and the American Academy of Pediatrics (AAP) that a dental visit occurs after the presence of the first tooth or by a child's first birthday. The AAPD has said that it is important to establish a comprehensive and accessible ongoing relationship between the dentist and patient – referring to this as the patient's "dental home". This is because early oral examination aids in the detection of the early stages of tooth decay. Early detection is essential to maintain oral health, modify aberrant habits, and treat as needed and as simply as possible. Additionally, parents are given a program of preventive home care (brushing, flossing and fluorides), a caries risk assessment, information on finger, thumb, and pacifier habits, and may include advice on preventing injuries to the mouth and teeth of children, diet counseling, and information on growth and development.

Pediatric dentists can also help prevent cavities by checking if a child is at risk of getting them. They look at things like what the child eats, how much plaque is on their teeth, and whether they use fluoride toothpaste. This helps dentists understand if a child needs extra care to keep their teeth healthy. They can also give parents advice on how to prevent cavities and take better care of their children's teeth.

== History ==
In 1909 Minnie Evangeline Jordon established the first dental practice in the United States devoted only to pediatric patients. In 1925 she published the first textbook on pediatric dentistry, titled Operative Dentistry for Children. The first dental care brought to public school was Alfred Fones in 1914, which was near 6 decades after the first woman, Lucy Hobbs Taylor, who received a DDS.

== Education ==
Pediatric dentistry is one of the ten dental specialties recognized by American Dental Association. Other specialties include dental public health, endodontics, oral and maxillofacial pathology, oral and maxillofacial radiology, oral and maxillofacial surgery, orthodontics and dentofacial orthopedics, periodontics, and prosthodontics.

The first step would be obtaining a college degree in biomedical science, health science, or social science as long as all biomedical course pre-requisites are met courses. While in college, one can explore the profession by shadowing in a pediatric dental office or children's hospital, or working on academic research that studies oral health of children.

Second step would be attending a dental school that involves four years of education and training. One can graduate with Doctor of Dental Surgery (DDS) or Doctor of Dental Medicine (DMD). Both degrees are equivalent and people receive the same training as required by the CODA (Commission on Dental Accreditation). During the first two years of dental school, dental students will take didactic classes on biomedical sciences and hands on classes to learn technical procedures in a pre-clinical laboratory setting. Third and fourth years of dental school focus on clinical care under the supervision of attending faculty who are licensed dentists. Before graduating, all dental students must pass National Board Dental Examination part I and part II, as well as clinical skill exams (e.g., ADEX, WREB, etc) to become a licensed general dentist.

In order to specialize in pediatric dentistry, one should receive additional in-depth training from an accredited postgraduate residency program. A pediatric dentistry residency program can be 24 months or more in length. At the end, resident dentists are awarded a certificate in pediatric dentistry with or without a master's degree depending on their program type. Specialized training covers all aspects of oral health care from infancy through adolescence, encompassing behavior management, preventive dentistry, restorative dentistry, sedation dentistry, oral trauma management, interceptive orthodontics, oral medicine and pathology. The majority of residency training is spent on treating pediatric patients in a dental clinic or hospital operating room where the patient is under general anesthesia.

Following successful completion of post-graduate training, one becomes Board-eligible for the American Board of Pediatric Dentistry(ABPD) examination. The first part of the Board exam is a written exam. Once passing the written exam, one moves on to the second part, which is an oral examination testing on clinical knowledge. Successful completion of board certification results in Diplomate status in the American Board of Pediatric Dentistry that allows one to practice as a Board-certified pediatric dentist.

== Job description ==
Responsibilities of a pediatric dentist include:

- Diagnose and treat oral disease (preventive and restorative)
- Interpret x-rays and other diagnostic tests
- Formulate treatment plans to restore oral health of pediatric patients including healthy one and those with special health care needs
- Monitor growth and development of all teeth and jaws
- Treat dental malocclusion interceptive orthodontic treatment and/or orthodontics
- Perform surgical procedures on teeth, bone, and soft tissues of the oral cavity
- Provide emergency care(dental infection, pain, and dental trauma)
- Treat pediatric patients under different levels of sedation (minimal, moderate, or deep) and general anesthesia

== Career outlook ==
It has been reported by the U.S. Bureau of Labor Statistics job demand for pediatric dentist will grow by 20% from 2014–2024. As of July 17th 2021, the average annual pay for a pediatric Dentist in the United States is $245,671. Most pediatric dentists work in private dental offices either as an associate dentist or an owner. They can also choose an academic route to conduct research and train dental residents.

== See also ==
- Dentistry for babies
- Hall Technique
- Minnie Evangeline Jordon
- Pediatric crowns
- School health services
- Special needs dentistry
