= Henriette Hirschfeld-Tiburtius =

Female dentist in Germany

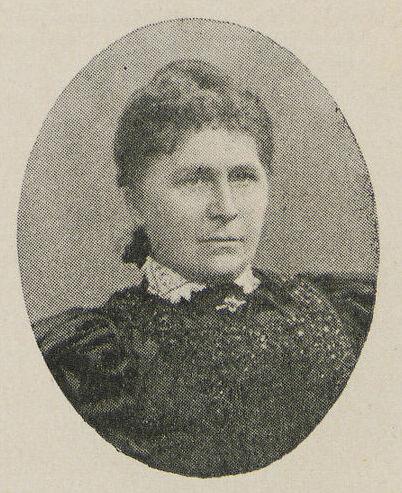
- Henriette Hirschfeld-Tiburtius in 1899
- Born: February 14, 1834; Sylt, Duchy of Schleswig (now Germany)
- Died: August 25, 1911 (aged 75); Berlin, Germany
- Occupation: First female dentist in Germany

Henriette Hirschfeld-Tiburtius (14 February 1834 – 25 August 1911) was the first female dentist in Germany.

She was born at Sylt, a small island on the west coast of Schleswig-Holstein. However, as there were no dental schools in Germany when she wished to attend (dental training in Germany then was through preceptorships) she attended the Pennsylvania College of Dental Surgery starting in 1867 and graduating in 1869. She was the first woman to take a full college course in dentistry, as Lucy Hobbs Taylor received credit for her time in dental practice before attending dental college. Having been assured by the Minister of Public Instruction in Germany that she would be allowed to practice in Germany if she earned her diploma in America, Henriette began a dental practice in Berlin. There the crown princess of Germany hired Henriette for her nursery. One of Henriette's own nieces was later employed in her practice.
