= Dentistry in Canada =

The practice of dentistry in Canada is overseen by the National Dental Examining Board of Canada in conjunction with other agencies, such as the Commission on Dental Accreditation of Canada and the Royal College of Dentists of Canada. In 2013 there were 21,109 dentists in Canada according to the Canadian Dental Association.

In 2023, the Government of Canada established the Canadian Dental Care Plan, which began a staggered enrolment rollout in December 2023, to pay costs for covered dental services of eligible residents.

== Licensure ==
Dentistry is a regulated profession in Canada. In order to practice dentistry, a dentist must obtain a license or permit from the province or territory they wish to practice in. The main requirement to obtain licensure in all Canadian provinces and territories is passing the National Dental Examination Board exams. Several provinces require applicants to complete a jurisprudence and ethics examination which tests knowledge related to local laws, ethics, and regulation of the profession.

=== NDEB examination ===
Candidates seeking to practice dentistry in Canada must successfully complete a two-part examination administered by the National Dental Examining Board of Canada (NDEB). Dental students at one of the 10 accredited Canadian or one of the 66 accredited American dental schools are permitted to take the examination no earlier than 3 months prior to graduation, which usually means the March of their graduating year. Upon successful completion of the exam, the NDEB issues a certificate to the candidate.

To be eligible to write the NDEB exam, candidates must have:

1. Graduated from an accredited dental school in Canada, the United States, Australia (since 2011), New Zealand (since 2011), or Ireland (since 2012) or
2. Passed the equivalency process for graduates of other dental schools (foreign-trained dentists).

=== Structure of the equivalency process ===
The equivalency process administered by the National Dental Examining Board of Canada consists of three sequential assessments:

1. Assessment of Fundamental Knowledge (AFK): A written examination evaluating biomedical and clinical science knowledge.
2. Assessment of Clinical Skills (ACS): A practical examination assessing operative and prosthodontic procedures using simulated models.
3. Assessment of Clinical Judgement (ACJ): A written examination focused on diagnosis, treatment planning, and decision-making.

Candidates must successfully complete all three assessments before becoming eligible for certification.

=== Challenges for internationally trained dentists ===
Internationally trained dentists pursuing licensure in Canada often face several challenges, including limited exam availability, high examination costs, and competitive pass rates. Preparation for the equivalency process may require significant time and access to specialized educational resources.

Additionally, candidates may experience delays due to the sequential nature of the examination process and limited seats in qualifying programs offered by accredited institutions.

=== Pass rates ===
Pass rates for equivalency examinations vary by year and assessment type. Historically, the Assessment of Clinical Skills (ACS) has been considered one of the most challenging components of the process, with lower success rates compared to other stages.

=== Costs of licensure ===
The total cost of becoming licensed as a dentist in Canada through the equivalency process can be substantial. Expenses may include examination fees, study materials, travel, and potential enrollment in preparatory courses or qualifying programs. These costs can reach tens of thousands of Canadian dollars.

=== Qualifying (advanced standing) programs and the equivalency process for foreign-trained dentists ===
Foreign-trained dentists can obtain a DMD or DDS from an accredited dental school in Canada or the United States by enrolling in a qualifying or advanced standing program. Typically, the program would consist of the last two to three years of a typical dental program.

The dental schools that offer these programs in Canada are:

- Dalhousie University
- University of Alberta
- University of British Columbia
- University of Toronto
- University of Manitoba
- University of Western Ontario
- McGill University
- Université de Montréal
- University of Saskatchewan

In 2011, the equivalency process for foreign-trained dentists was launched.

The process consists of three exams:

1. Assessment of fundamental knowledge written exam. An exam based on multiple choice question format.
2. Assessment of clinical skills exam: a practical exam on typodonts and manikins.
3. Assessment of clinical judgement written exam.

The alternative route of going through a qualifying program or advanced standing program still exists. To gain a licence to practice dentistry in Canada: there is International Dentist Advanced Placement Program (IDAPP).Non-accredited programs Countries recognised by the Commission on Dental Accreditation of Canada (CDAC) or the American Dental Association Commission on Dental Accreditation (CODA) are: Australia, Canada, Ireland, New Zealand, USA. If you qualified in a country not listed above, you will be considered non-accredited.

When it first launched in 2011, only 44 candidates passed the equivalency process. In 2014 over 260 candidates passed and in 2017, that number rose to 307 candidates. These numbers are expected to keep going up as the number of candidates challenging the exams has been rising steadily year after year.

== Over-saturation of dentists in Canada ==
According to the Canadian Dental Association, the population-to-dentist ratio has been dropping in all provinces and territories. This dentist glut is resulting in growing competition and tough times for dentists especially in urban centres like Toronto.

== Dental groups in Canada ==
Dental support organizations (DSOs) play a significant role in the Canadian dental industry, offering administrative and operational support to clinics. Some of the largest DSOs in Canada include:

- 123Dentist – A national dental support organization operating clinics across Canada, providing marketing, human resources, procurement and operational support while allowing dentists to retain ownership of their practices.
- dentalcorp – Described in 2025 as Canada's largest dental practice network, with more than 550 clinics. In January 2026 it was taken private by the United States investment firm GTCR in an all-cash transaction valuing it at about C$2.2 billion in equity and C$3.3 billion in enterprise value, ending its listing on the Toronto Stock Exchange.
- Passion Dental Group – A DSO supporting clinics across Canada with business operations, patient care, and administrative services.

== Achievements ==
The first woman to be licensed as a dentist in Canada was Emma Gaudreau Casgrain in 1898. She was trained by her husband, dental surgeon Henri-Edmond Casgrain, an innovator in dentistry.

== Costs and attendance ==
One in three Canadians has no dental insurance and over six million people in Canada don't visit the dentist every year because they can't afford to. The New Democratic Party (NDP) supports expanding the national health care system to include dental care.
