= McGill Faculty of Dental Medicine and Oral Health Sciences =

Dental school of McGill University

Coordinates: 45.50346°N 73.57399°W

- Faculté de médecine dentaire et des sciences de la santé orale (French)
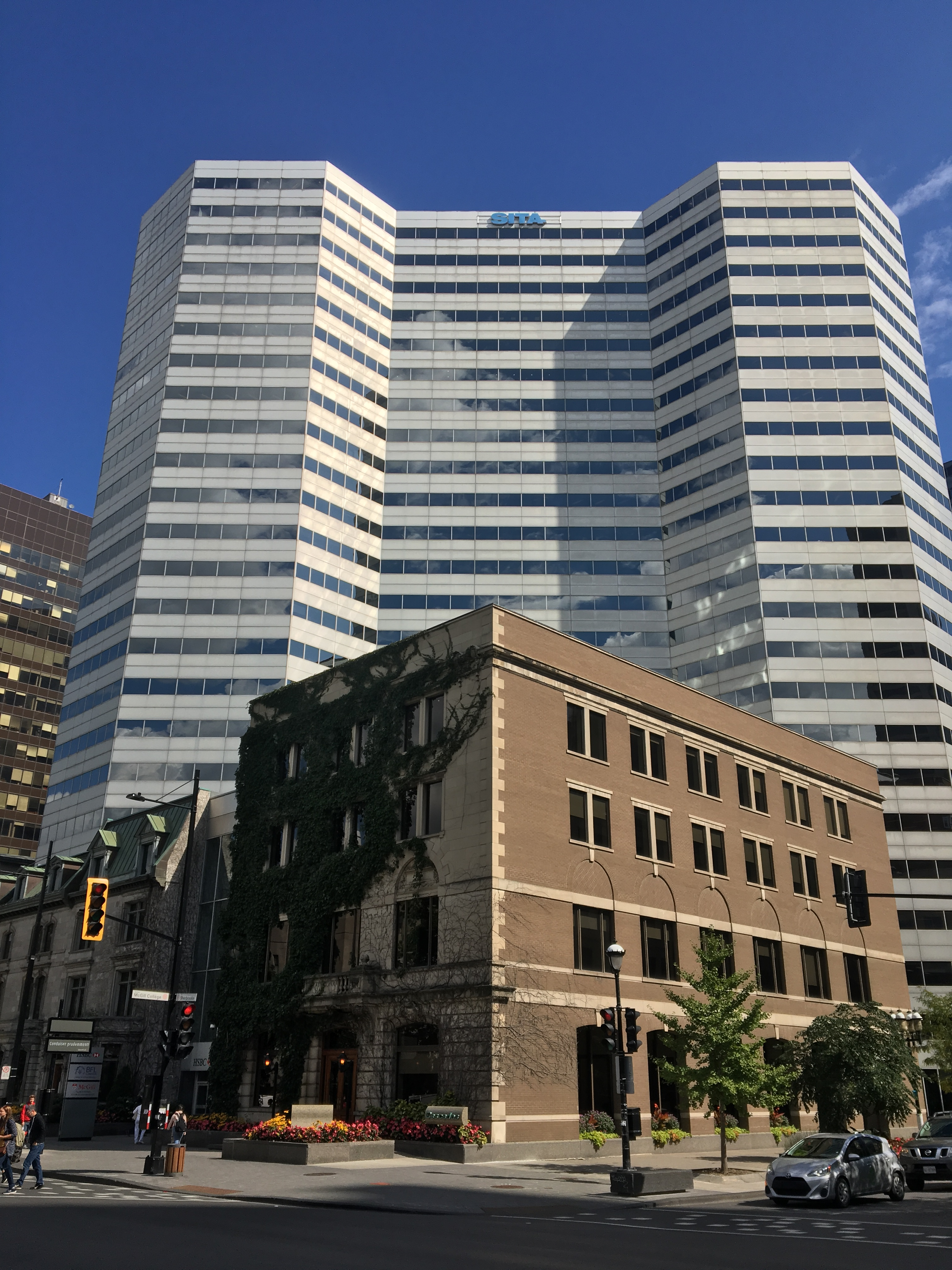
- The faculty building
- Type: Public dental school
- Established: 1892; 134 years ago
- Parent institution: McGill University
- Academic affiliations: McGill University Health Centre, Montreal General Hospital, Jewish General Hospital, Montreal Children's Hospital, McGill University Faculty of Medicine
- Dean: Elham Emami
- Faculty: 294
- Administrative staff: 100
- Students: 296 Total, 162 (DMD), 102 (Graduate/Doctoral), 32 (Resident/Fellows)
- Location: 2001 McGill College Avenue, Montreal, Quebec, Canada
- Campus: Urban
- Language: English
- Website: mcgill.ca/dentistry

The McGill Faculty of Dental Medicine and Oral Health Sciences is one of the constituent faculties of McGill University. It became established as a constituent of McGill in 1904 as the McGill Dental School, a department in the McGill University Faculty of Medicine until becoming its own faculty in 1920. In 2022, the Faculty of Dentistry was renamed as the Faculty of Dental Medicine and Oral Health Sciences to reflect the diversity of research conducted in the Faculty that goes beyond the dental chair. The Faculty is closely affiliated with the Montreal General Hospital, Jewish General Hospital, Montreal Children's Hospital, and McGill University Faculty of Medicine.

It is located in the heart of Downtown Montreal across the Roddick Gates entrance to the McGill campus.

It is the only dental program in the country that integrates MD and DMD education in single classes for the first four semesters of the "Fundamentals of Medicine and Dentistry" curriculum. It is home to the largest general practice residency (GPR) program in Canada which consists of three sites Montreal General Hospital, Jewish General Hospital, and Montreal Children's Hospital.

== History ==
The Faculty Practice

The origins of the McGill Faculty of Dental Medicine and Oral Health Sciences are traced to the Dental College of the Province of Quebec (established by the Dental Association of the Province of Quebec) in 1892, the second dental school to be established in Canada after the Royal College of Dental Surgeons. As a bilingual professional school, it later became a part of Bishop's University's Faculty of Medicine in 1896 and all graduates were offered the degree of Doctor in Dental Surgery (DDS). In 1904, it became the McGill Dental School as a department within the faculty of medicine at McGill as part of its amalgamation of Bishop's University's relatively small faculty of medicine and offering Master's in Dental Surgery (MDS) degree. It officially became its own faculty in the year 1920.

In October 1908, McGill decided that those who graduated earlier that year with their MDS should be made Doctors of Dental Science (DDS). The degree continued to be awarded until 1917, when it was modified to Doctor of Dental Surgery (DDS). During the First World War, the first Canadian dentists to serve overseas were part of an entirely McGill unit, deployed with No. 3 Canadian General Hospital (McGill).

In 2000, the Faculty awarded its first Doctor of Dental Medicine (DMD) degrees, reflective the advancement within the profession traditional surgery to general oral medicine and health.

In 2014, the faculty completed an $18.3 million building project to relocate the dental facilities into a new building in the heart of McGill University's downtown campus.

In 2019, the McGill Faculty of Dentistry launched its strategic planning exercise to provide a concrete pathway to achieving its vision for making the Faculty a leader among dental schools around the world. This process also gave direction for planning, programming and implementation of policies, strategies and new initiatives across the Faculty of Dentistry during the five-year period 2021–2026. The strategic planning and revised Faculty vision, mission and value statements were the driving force for finding a new name that reflected how the Faculty has evolved and progressed during its century-long history. On January 3, 2022, the Faculty of Dentistry was renamed as the Faculty of Dental Medicine and Oral Health Sciences.

== Curriculum ==
The faculty offers a Doctor of Medicine in Dentistry (D.M.D.) degree. In keeping with the joint history of the McGill University Faculty of Medicine with the Faculty of Dentistry, the D.M.D. students undertake a joint curriculum with the M.D., C.M. students in the Fundamentals of Medicine and Dentistry curriculum in the first 18 months of their medical education, along with additional dentistry-related courses. In the second year, when the medical curriculum is complete, dental students transition into a fundamentals of dentistry curriculum followed by practical pre-clinic.

The faculty also confers several graduate level degrees: thesis M.Sc. in Dental Sciences; non-thesis M.Sc. in Dental Sciences; and a Ph.D. in Oral Health Sciences, which are also available to international applicants. In addition to the undergraduate level dental curriculum, there are 3 General Practice Residency (GPR) programs affiliated with the faculty including those at the Montreal General Hospital, Jewish General Hospital, and the Montreal Children's Hospital. The university is one of the two nationally with a residency program in Special Care Dental Medicine, offering education in the management of those with complex or special care needs. The faculty also has an Oral Medicine specialty program and a six-year oral and maxillofacial surgery (OMFS)/Doctor of Medicine, Master of Surgery (M.D., C.M.) program offered at the Montreal General Hospital, a Level-1 Trauma Center. There are approximately 150-160 students enrolled in the undergraduate level (D.M.D.), with an additional ~90 graduate students and 33 in the G.P.R. and M.D., C.M.-OMFS residency programs.

McGill University Faculty of Dental Medicine and Oral Health Sciences has a center of the International Team for Implantology (ITI) Scholarship Program, a one year fellowship program in implantology and the second available in Canada.

The Faculty of Dental Medicine and Oral Health Sciences also offers a robust curriculum of continuing education courses accredited by both the American Dental Association’s Continuing Education Recognition Program (ADA-CERP) and the Canadian dental licensing bodies, including as a preferred partner by the Ordre des dentistes du Québec (ODQ).

The D.M.D. and specialty programs at McGill University are accredited by the American Dental Association (ADA) through the Commission on Dental Accreditation (CODA).

== Research ==
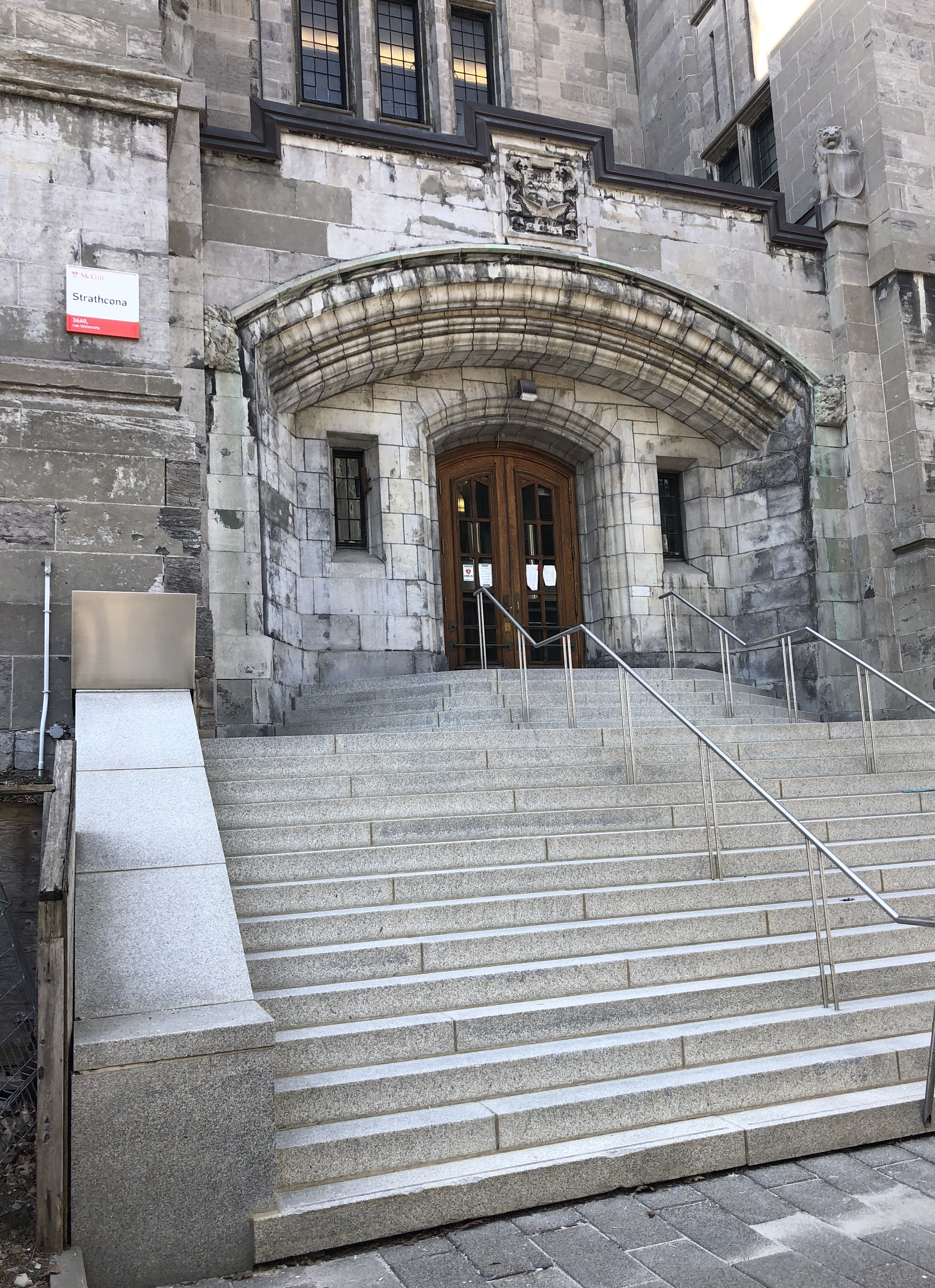
Built in 1909, the Strathcona Anatomy and Dentistry building is home to one of the research sites for the faculty

The faculty research is concentrated in 4 major areas: pain and neuroscience; mineralized tissues and extracellular matrix biology; biomaterials, nanobiotechnology and tissue engineering; and population oral health. Approximately one-third of all oral health-related research in Canada is performed at McGill despite it being represented by only 5% of the Canadian dentistry professors. It also graduates more dental research graduate students than any other dental school in Canada. McGill's Faculty of Dental Medicine and Oral Health Sciences also produces more per capita research funding to McGill compared to the McGill Faculty of Medicine, despite the faculty's size. In 2024, faculty researchers obtained a remarkable $8,063,796 in research funding.

The faculty also hosts its research activities within multiple research sites including at the Faculty of Dental Medicine and Oral Health Sciences building on Sherbrooke, at the Montreal General Hospital, the Jewish General Hospital, the Montreal Children's Hospital, the Strathcona Anatomy & Dentistry Building, the Alan Edwards Pain Management Unit, and at the McGill Faculty of Medicine.

== Reputation ==
The Faculty of Dental Medicine and Oral Health Sciences is notoriously competitive in terms of admissions with an acceptance rate of 3.4% for the 2021 admissions cycle. The number of admissions to the D.M.D. program is approximately 37-38 students annually. For the 2026 admissions cycle, the average accepted cGPA was 3.90 with 9 students having completed a masters degree. For the last several cycles of admission the average undergraduate cGPA was 3.90 (post-graduate GPA is not considered in admissions) with approximately 8-9 entering students having completed a Masters or Doctorate degree. As of the year 2014, applicants are interviewed via Multiple Mini-Interviews (MMI) held at the McGill University Steinberg Centre for Simulation and Interactive Learning (SCSIL), along with the prospective Faculty of Medicine students. Students are also initially screened prior to interview selection via the CASPer test.

McGill University is ranked as the number 1 medical-doctoral school nationally in Canada by Maclean's for 20 straight years (including the most recent ranking for 2025). McGill Faculty of Dental Medicine and Oral Health Sciences students have the highest rate of residency or specialization in the country with approximately 90% of the graduating students ultimately continuing their education via either specialty or residency.

The Faculty of Dental Medicine and Oral Health Sciences has a wide-ranging community service program offered with funding through the faculty, student fundraising initiatives, and external donors. These programs include the Jim Lund Dental Clinic at the Welcome Hall Mission, Oral Health Clinic for the Neurodivergent Community, Immigrant and Refugee Pediatric Dental Clinic (Montreal Children's Hospital), the McGill Mobile Dental Clinic, Dent ma maison, and the McGill Summer Dental Clinic, which provided a combined $4,855,993 of free dental care to the underprivileged in the year 2024-2025. The faculty was awarded the Gies Award for Outstanding Vision by the American Dental Education Association in 2019.

== Notable Alumni and Faculty ==
- Emma Gaudreau Casgrain
- William George Beers
- Jocelyne Feine
- Donald Keith Duncan
- David Goltzman
- William Shaw
- Jeffrey Mogil
- Phil Samis
- Paul J. Allison
- Robert Wiener
- Gilles J Lavigne
- Alexandre Petrovic
- Luda Diatchenko
- George A. Freedman
- Craven Kurz

== History of Deans ==
- William George Beers 1892 - 1897
- Peter Brown 1902 - 1910
- D. James Berwick 1910 - 1914
- A. W. Thornton 1913 - 1927
- Arthur L. Walsh 1927 - 1947
- D. Prescott Mowry 1948 - 1952
- James McCutcheon 1954 - 1970
- Ernest Reynolds Ambrose 1970 - 1977
- Kenneth C. Bentley 1977 - 1987
- Ralph Barolet 1987 - 1994
- James Lund 1994 - 2008
- Paul J. Allison 2008 - 2018
- Elham Emami 2018–Present

== See also ==
- McGill University Faculty of Medicine
- McGill University Health Centre
- Montreal General Hospital
- Jewish General Hospital
- Montreal Children's Hospital
- Journal of the Canadian Dental Association
- No. 3 Canadian General Hospital (McGill)
