= Elham Emami =

Iranian-Canadian clinician scientist

Academic background
- Education: MSc, PhD, Université de Montréal and McGill University; GPR McGill University; DDS., University of Tehran
- Thesis: A randomized follow-up study of the general health and quality of life of an elderly edentulous population wearing either mandibular two-implant overdentures or conventional dentures. (2008)

Elham Emami FCAHS is an Iranian-Canadian clinician scientist. She is the dean of McGill University Dental Medicine and Oral Health Sciences. Born and raised in Iran, Emami moved to Canada in 2002 to pursue her PhD and MSc at the Université de Montréal.

In 2019, Emami was elected a Fellow of the Canadian Academy of Health Sciences and Académie dentaire du Québec.

== Early life and education ==
When she moved to Canada in 2002, Emami already had 17 years of experience with general dental practice in Iran. She has two degrees from the Université de Montréal: a PhD in biomedical science and an MSc in prosthodontic rehabilitation. Between her prosthodontics training and the completion of her dental school training she completed a GPR certificate at the Jewish General Hospital of McGill University. She also completed a post-doctoral fellowship in dental public health at McGill University and in Cancer Epidemiology at Université de Montréal.

== Career ==
During this time, she co-authored with Jocelyne Feine a study titled Impact of implant support for mandibular dentures on satisfaction, oral and general health‐related quality of life: a meta‐analysis of randomized‐controlled trials. She took on the role of adjunct professor at the McGill University in 2011. Later, Emami and Igor Karp received a research grant to study the link between oral health and colorectal cancer. She received an IMHA-supported CIHR Clinician Scientist program award.

Emami has sat on various editorial boards for dentistry journals, including the Journal of Dental Research, Journal of the Canadian Dental Association, and Trials. She became the Dean of the McGill University Faculty of Dentistry in 2018. Also in 2018 she was appointed as a member of the Canadian Institutes of Health Research Institute of Musculoskeletal Health and Arthritis Advisory Board. The following year, she was elected a Fellow of the Canadian Academy of Health Sciences and Académie dentaire du Québec.
