= Gilles J. Lavigne =

Canadian clinical scientist

Gilles J. Lavigne CM FRSC FCAHS
- Born: May 1952 (age 74); Quebec, Canada
- Occupation: Researcher
- Known for: Sleep apnea, sleep bruxism, pain research
- Awards: Order of Canada

Academic background
- Education: University of Montreal; Georgetown University; University of Toronto

Gilles J. Lavigne CM FRSC FCAHS is a Canadian clinician scientist, researcher and oral medicine specialist. He is an expert on sleep apnea, sleep bruxism, and sleep-pain interaction and currently holds the Canada Research Chair (tier 1) in Pain, Sleep and Trauma.

He is a professor at the Faculty of Dental Medicine and Oral Health Sciences with an appointment in Neurology and Neurosurgery, Faculty of Medicine at McGill University. He has authored more than 450 scientific papers and published 4 books, with an h-index of 106.

== Early life and education ==
Gilles J. Lavigne obtained his DMD and MSc in Neurological Sciences degrees from University of Montreal in 1977 and 1983, respectively. He obtained specialty training in Oral Medicine at Georgetown University in Washington DC, USA in 1985. He completed a postdoctoral fellowship at the National Institute of Health in Bethesda, Maryland, USA on the neurobiology of pain from 1985 to 1987. He then completed a PhD in Trigeminal Neuroscience at University of Toronto in 2004.

== Career ==
He has been a professor at the Faculty of Dentistry at the University of Montreal since 1987. He was also visiting professor at Faculté de Médecine Université de Lausanne. He previously held the position of President of the Dental Sciences Committee of the Canadian Institutes of Health Research from 2003 to 2005.

He is a former dean of the University of Montreal Faculty of Dentistry from 2008 to 2016.

He currently sits on the executive board committee of the Canadian Academy of Health Sciences.

== Awards ==
He received an Honorary Doctorate from the Faculty of Medicine at the University of Zurich in 2009 recognizing his contributions to clarifying the relationships between the sleep-wake cycle, pain and movement disorders in the area of the masticatory system. In 2018, he was appointed member of the Order of Canada.
