= National Dental Examining Board of Canada =

Canadian dental organization

National Dental Examining Board of Canada Le bureau national d'examen dentaire du Canada
- Formation: 1952
- Type: Professional association
- Headquarters: 340 Albert Street, 12th Floor Ottawa, Ontario, Canada K1R 7Y6
- Members: Dentists
- Official language: English and French
- President: Dr. Stefan Haas-Jean
- Website: NDEB

The National Dental Examining Board of Canada, also known as the NDEB (French: Le Bureau national d'examen dentaire du Canada), is the organization that is responsible for granting approval for dentists to practice in Canada through standardized examinations. Its headquarters are in Ottawa.

According to the Act of Parliament, the NDEB is responsible for the establishment of qualifying conditions for a national standard of dental competence for general practitioners, for establishing and maintaining an examination facility to test for this national standard of dental competence and for issuing certificates to dentists who successfully meet this national standard. The NDEB, in cooperation with the Royal College of Dentists of Canada, is also responsible for the establishment of qualifying conditions for a single standard national certificate for dental specialties.

== History ==
In 1906 under the auspices of The Canadian Dental Association (CDA) the Dominion Dental Council was formed to conduct national written examinations, the successful completion of which would grant the candidate a Dominion Dental Council certificate. The National Certificate could then be presented to the Provincial Dental Regulatory Authorities (DRAs) as evidence of the candidate's ability to meet a basic national standard of competence. Some DRAs were prepared to grant licenses to practice on the basis of the certificate, however, others chose to accept the certificate as an academic base only and required the candidate to pass provincial practical tests in addition.

The Dominion Dental Council proved to be rather ineffective. A name change to The Dental Council of Canada in 1950 along with attempts to improve the efficiency of the examination mechanism still failed to attract strong support from the DRAs. This was in spite of the fact that the DRA's agreed with the general concept. They had indicated a desire to be free of provincial licensing examinations, providing that a strong competent national examination system could be introduced, which they could support.

The following year (1951) the CDA encouraged the ten DRAs to meet in an attempt to develop a satisfactory plan for a National Examining Board. Its purpose was to provide a facility by which members of the profession could become eligible, on a national basis, to apply for practice privileges in the province of their choice. This meeting resulted in the incorporation of The National Dental Examining Board of Canada (NDEB) in 1952 by an Act of Parliament of Canada. The Act was supported by all ten DRA's and by the CDA and this support continues today.

Since 1952, the NDEB has issued 21,907 certificates.

== Structure ==
The National Dental Examining Board of Canada is composed of twelve members. Each DRA appoints one member and two members are appointed by the Commission on Dental Accreditation of Canada.

In 1994, the Board designated representatives from the Royal College of Dentists of Canada, the Commission on Dental Accreditation of Canada, the Canadian Dental Association and the CDA Committee on Student Affairs as official observers. In 2004, the Board designated a representative from the Canadian Dental Regulatory Authorities Federation (CDRAF)as an official observer and appointed a Public Representative.

The Executive Committee of the Board, consisting of the President, President-Elect, Past-President and two other members, meets two or three times a year. The full Board meets annually. The NDEB also has standing committees dealing with examinations, appeals, finances and by-laws.

The NDEB appoints a Chief Examiner for the examinations. Examiners are appointed by the Board from lists submitted by the DRA's and lists submitted by the Deans of Canadian dental faculties. The NDEB is a non-profit organization supported financially by fees charged to candidates for examination certification.

== Certification ==
Prior to 1971, a graduate of an undergraduate dental program in Canada was required to successfully complete the NDEB examination (written essay-type) in order to be certified. This policy was changed in 1971, when the NDEB decided to recognize the examinations and evaluation administered by Canadian faculties of dentistry and issue certificates to current graduates of these faculties without further examination. The conditions for certification of current graduates were established at this time to be proper application and graduation from an undergraduate dental program approved by the Commission on Dental Accreditation of Canada.

The NDEB, through its representatives on the Commission on Dental Accreditation of Canada and an appointee on each undergraduate program survey team actively participates in the accreditation process. In addition, the NDEB gives an annual grant to the Commission to be applied to accreditation costs of undergraduate dental programs in Canada and the United States.

In 1988 concern was expressed by several DRA's about the validity of establishing clinical competence solely by accreditation. This concern was further intensified by the extension of the accreditation cycle from five to seven years. The NDEB, therefore, in 1989 established a committee "to explore whether the granting of a certificate on the basis of accreditation alone continues to be acceptable." This committee (Certification Review Committee or CRC) presented its report at the 1990 NDEB Annual Meeting. The report stated that certification based on accreditation alone was no longer acceptable, a finding which was further supported in the Parker Report.

As a result, the NDEB authorized two pilot projects which introduced and tested the use of NDEB external examiners/observers. In 1991 this involved the University of British Columbia, l’Université de Montréal and the University of Toronto. In 1992, the Universities of Alberta, Manitoba, McGill, Western Ontario and l’Université de Montréal participated in this pilot project. The pilot projects were deemed highly satisfactory by the NDEB. In 1993, certification for graduates of accredited Canadian Faculties of dentistry was based on present requirements and a successful report on the faculties’ participation in the NDEB External Examiner System.

In 1994, at the request of the DRA's, the NDEB abandoned the External Examiner System and required that Canadian graduates pass the Written Examination. The NDEB committed to develop and implement an Objective Structured Clinical Examination (OSCE).

As a result of changes adopted at the 1993 Annual Meeting, in 1995 and onwards, graduates of dental programs accredited by the Commission on Dental Accreditation of Canada were required to pass both the NDEB Written Examination and the NDEB Objective Structured Clinical Examination (OSCE) in order to be certified.

In 1995 and 1996 an intense and lengthy consultation process with the DRA's, the Commission on Dental Accreditation of Canada (CDAC), the Association of Canadian Faculties of Dentistry (ACFD), the American Association of Dental Schools (AADS) and the Commission on Dental Accreditation of the American Dental Association (ADA) was held. As a result, a Notice of Motion was presented to the 1995 Annual Meeting that would significantly change the Board's certification process. This Notice of Motion was circulated to the communities of interest and as a result, was revised, outlining conditions that required action by the ADA, the ACFD and the CDAC. In addition, to preserve national portability, the motion had to be ratified by all ten DRA's.

During 1996, the ADA, CDAC and ACFD confirmed that the required changes would be made. The motion was subsequently passed by the NDEB at the November 1996 Annual Meeting and was ratified by all ten DRA's.

As a result of the ADA Commission on Dental Accreditation making requested changes to their accreditation procedures, including the addition of state and national licensing board representatives to all site survey teams, the codification of the relationship between the ADA Commission on Dental Accreditation and the CDAC that ensures formal representation and involvement in each other's process, the identification of the requested outcome measurement similar to the CDAC's the Clinical Outcomes Review (CORE) Process. The NDEB was able to verify that the CDAC and the ADA accreditation processes were equivalent. Therefore, as of January 1, 1997, graduates of both US and Canadian accredited undergraduate dental programs were considered "accredited graduates". To be certified, these graduates must pass the Written and OSCE Examinations within a specified period of time.

Until December 31, 1999, graduates of accredited programs who did not successfully complete the Written and OSCE Examinations within 7 years of graduation were granted a certificate by the Board following successful completion of the Examination for Certification of graduates of non-accredited dental programs established by the Board.

After January 1, 2000, graduates of accredited dental programs who do not successfully complete the Written and OSCE Examinations within 7 years of graduation were eligible to receive the Board's certificate by successfully completing a Qualifying Program and then successfully completing the Written and OSCE Examinations.

As a result of wide consultation during a Strategic Planning process in 2003, the Board revised the "7 year rule" and allowed graduates of accredited programs who were more than 60 months past the date of their graduation to apply for special consideration to participate in the Board's certification process. Also, in 2003, the Board placed a limit on the number of times a candidate could take an examination and added a public official observer.

Since the changes to the certification process for graduates of non-accredited dental programs in 1996, the Executive Committee of the National Dental Examining Board of Canada (NDEB) has been continually monitoring the results.

The 1996 changes introduced the 2 year Qualifying/Degree Completion Programs. The Commission on Dental Accreditation of Canada's (CDAC) Standards for the Qualifying/Degree Completion Programs initially required that these programs be two academic years in length. Presently, these are approximately 80 students accepted into these programs each year. These programs work extremely well, faculties report that virtually every student requires the full 2 years in the programs to meet the national standard. However, it has been reported that there have been a few students who may not have needed the full 2 years.

In 2001, to provide more flexibility, the NDEB and the Canadian Dental Regulatory Authority Federation (CDRAF) requested the CDAC change the standards to allow a student to demonstrate competence in a shorter time. Although CDAC modified the standards, the Qualifying Programs find it difficult to satisfactorily evaluate students until they have almost completed the programs. In addition, as of 2006, all Faculties of Dentistry in Canada have moved to Degree Completion Programs which, due to university regulation, have 2-year residency requirements.

Currently, the CDRAF has initiated a certification process for graduates of non-accredited dental specialty programs, and several Provincial Dental Regulatory Authorities (DRA's) have indicated the need to develop an alternative process for certification of general dentists.

== Structure of examination ==
=== Written Examination ===
The Written Examination consists of two papers, each with 100 multiple choice type questions. Each paper is given in a two hours examination session. The sessions are held in the morning and afternoon of one day. One part of the written examination tests the basic sciences while the other tests the clinical sciences.

The basic sciences portion resembles Part I of the National Board Dental Examination in the United States, while the clinical portion is similar to Part II.

=== Objective Structured Clinical Examination (OSCE) ===
The OSCE is a station type examination (also known as "bell-ringer" type).

The majority of the stations have two questions and require the candidate to review the information supplied (e.g. case history, photographs, radiographs, casts, models) and answer extended match type questions. Each extended match type question has up to 15 answer options and one or more correct answer(s). A few stations may require the candidate to review the information supplied and write an acceptable prescription for a medication commonly prescribed by general dentists in Canada.

Candidates have five minutes at each station to answer the questions, after which they move on to the next station.

== Current exam ==
The dates of the current exam cycle are a Saturday and a Sunday in March, June and December. The examination is administered on two consecutive days; the written section on Saturday and the OSCE on Sunday. Accommodations can usually be made for candidates who have conflicting religious observations. For candidates who observe the Sabbath on Saturday, the written exam may be taken on Friday. The current fee for the exam is CDN $2800. Once graduation from an accredited dental school is confirmed, the NDEB sends successful candidates an official certificate, which in turn is used to apply to individual provinces and territories for licensure.
