= Paul Allison =

Paul Allison may refer to:

- Paul J. Allison, British-Canadian clinician-scientist and dentist
- Paul D. Allison, American statistician and sociologist
