= RCDC =

RCDC may refer to:

- Robot Chicken DC Comics Special
- Royal Canadian Dental Corps
- Royal College of Dentists of Canada
