= Coronation Dental Specialty Group =

Canadian dental practice

- Industry: Dentistry
- Founded: Cambridge, Ontario, Canada (1975)
- Founder: Dr. Harry Hersh & Leslie Diamond
- Headquarters: Cambridge, Ontario
- Number of locations: 7 (Cambridge, Waterloo, Woodstock, Stratford, Goderich, Brantford, Guelph)
- Area served: Southwestern, Ontario
- Key people: Leslie Diamond, Ian Furst, Cesare Ciavarro, Stephen Cho, Sufian Sheikh, Dan Weitz, Sarah Abitbol, Aaron Fox, Justin Bubola, Ramez Shehata
- Services: Oral & Maxillofacial Surgery, Anaesthesia, Endodontics, Periodontics
- Number of employees: 70
- Website: www.coronationdentalspecialty.ca

Coronation Dental Specialty Group is multi-site dental practice in southwestern Ontario with a practice limited to dental specialists including Oral and Maxillofacial Surgery, Endodontics, Periodontics, Oral Pathology and Anaesthesia. Coronation Dental provides services for removal of wisdom teeth, dental implants, gum surgery, gum grafting, root canals and anaesthesia. It employs 70 full and part-time people in Southwestern Ontario.

== Services ==
Coronation Dental operates out of seven surgical centres and four hospitals with Cambridge being a central resource for all centres. Oral & Maxillofacial Surgery and anaesthesia, supports each of the seven offices, while the other specialties are available in Cambridge and Waterloo.

Four specialities serve with Coronation Dental Specialty Group including Oral & Maxillofacial Surgery (surgery of the face and jaws including wisdom teeth, dental implants, bone grafting, trauma and pathology), Periodontics (gum surgery, laser gum surgery, gum grafting), Endodontics (root canal, apical surgery). There are 5 Oral Surgeons, 1 Periodontist, 2 Endodontists and 1 Oral Pathologist.

All of the practitioners are registered with the Royal College of Dental Surgeons of Ontario as specialists and to provide anaesthesia during procedures. In addition, a medical anaesthetist, registered through the College of Physicians and Surgeons of Ontario provides anaesthetics for more challenging medical requirements.

== Community activities and hospital affiliations ==
- Cambridge Memorial Hospital
- Woodstock General Hospital
- Stratford General Hospital/Huron Perth Alliance
- Alexandra Marine and General Hospital

Coronation Dental supports local charities through a charitable program in the practice.

== Academic activities ==
Many of the doctors hold appointments to the University of Toronto, Faculty of Dentistry as clinical educators. Drs. Ciavarro, Diamond and Cho hold appointments as clinical instructors in the Department of Oral Surgery. The group also provides continuing education within the local community through education nights and lectures at society meetings. Dr. Furst is an editorial consultant to the JCDA and spearheaded the JCDA OASIS (Web 2.0) platform with Dr. John O'Keefe. For primary research, a complete list of peer-reviewed publications can be found on PubMed through the Library of Congress website searching by the doctor's name.

== History ==
Coronation Dental was founded by an Oral Surgeon transplanted from Montreal, Canada to Cambridge, Ontario. Dr. Harry Hersh had trained at Boston University where the various specialties in dentistry shared a clinic space and collaboration was commonplace. His goal was to recreate a private clinic environment where the same collaboration could occur. At the time, it was more common for specialists to practice alone. During the 1980s and 1990s Dr. Hersh expanded the practice to the cities of Woodstock, Stratford, and Goderich and took on associates. In 2007 the Cambridge office was expanded. Later, satellite offices opened in Waterloo (2010), Guelph (2013) and Brantford (2013)

== Pictures ==
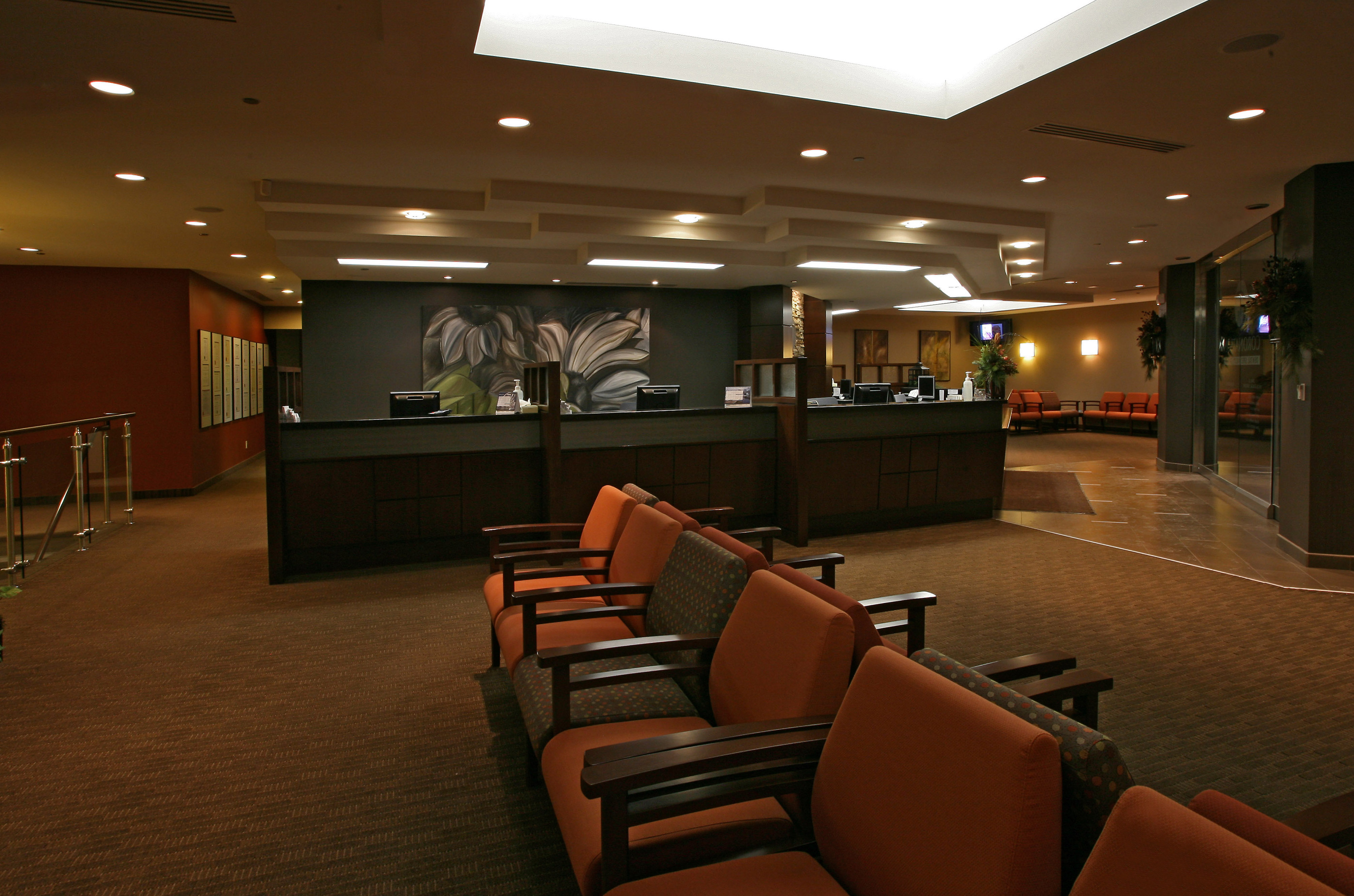
Reception area of Cambridge location Coronation Dental Specialty Group

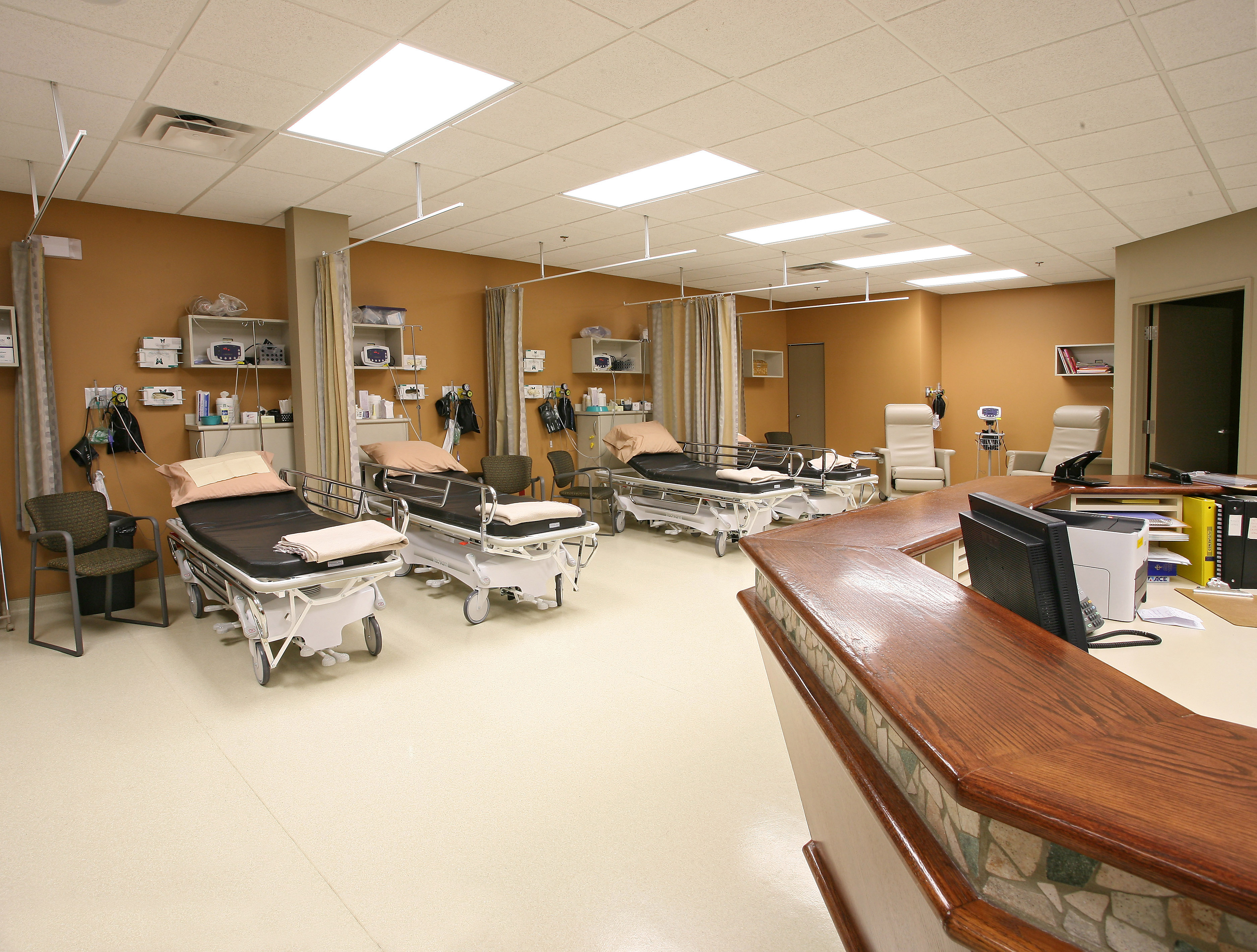
Recovery room of Cambridge location Coronation Dental Specialty Group

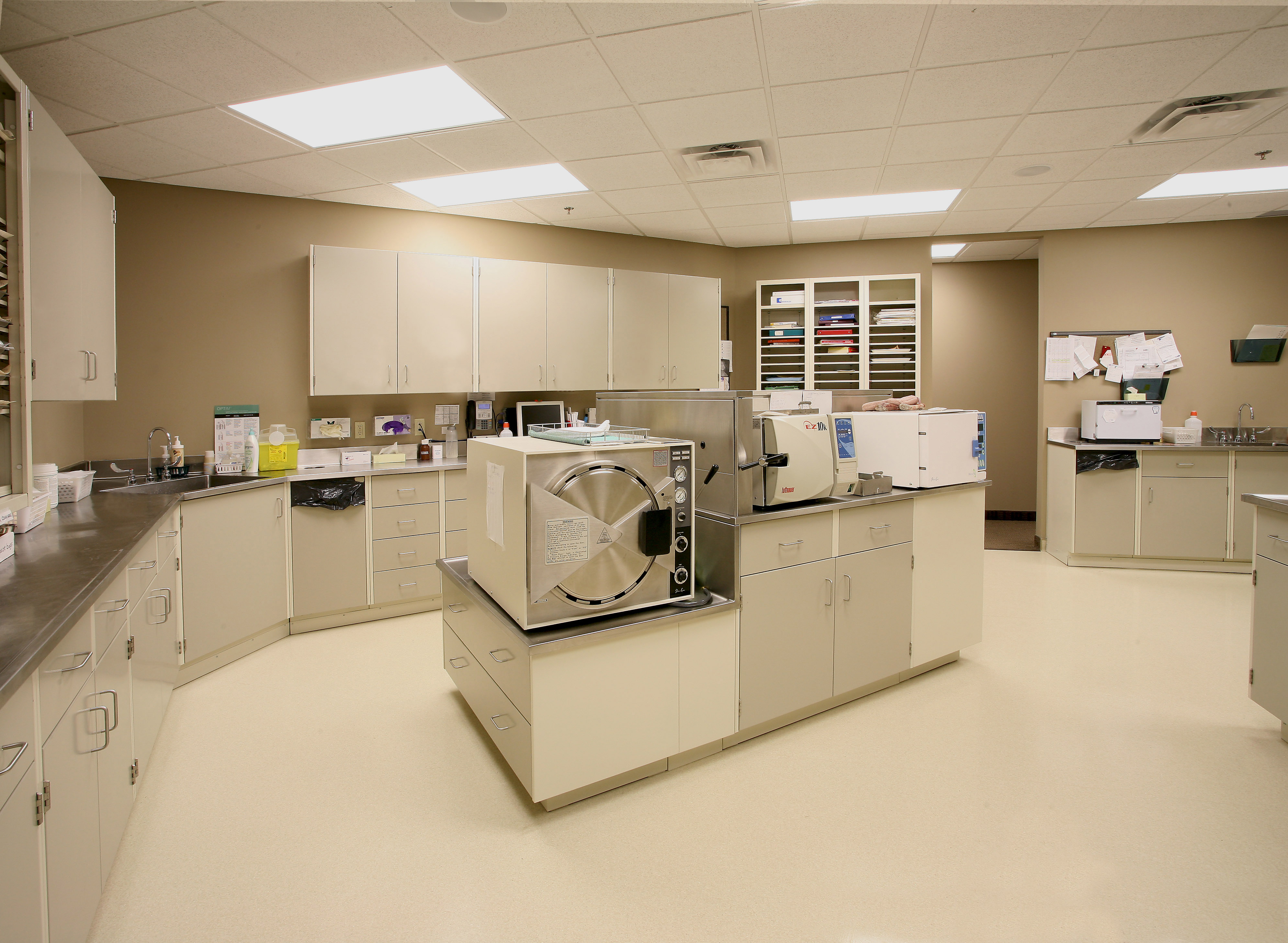
Sterilization area of Cambridge location Coronation Dental Specialty Group

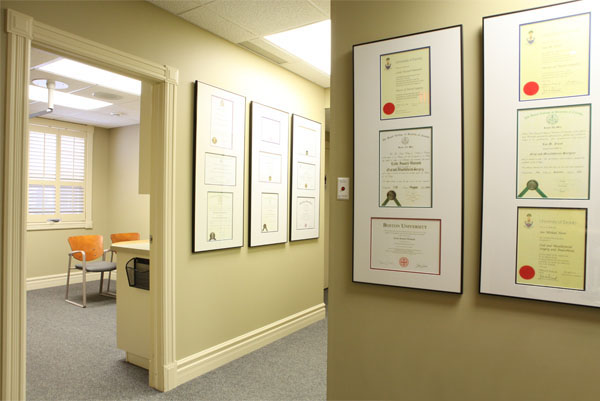
Diplomas and consultation room in Stratford location Coronation Dental Specialty Group
