= Paul J. Allison =

Canadian clinical scientist

- Born: United Kingdom
- Occupation: Epidemiologist

Academic background
- Education: University College London, McGill University

Academic work
- Institutions: McGill University Faculty of Dentistry

Paul J. Allison is a British-Canadian clinician scientist and dentist with oral surgery training. He is the immediate former dean of the McGill University Faculty of Dentistry and is the current president of the Canadian Academy of Health Sciences.

== Early life and education ==
Paul Allison obtained his BDS degree from University College London in 1986 after which he trained in Oral and Maxillofacial Surgery. In 1994 he completed an MSc in the field of Dental Public Health at the same institution. He completed his PhD at McGill University in 1998.

== Career ==
He was appointed dean of the Faculty of Dentistry at McGill in 2008, a position he held until 2018. In 2019, he was one of 27 research, policy, advocacy & clinical dentistry experts globally and one of two Canadians on the landmark Lancet Commission on Oral Health.

He previously held the position of President of the Association of Canadian Faculties of Dentistry (ACFD) from 2015-2020.

In October 2020, Paul J. Allison was one of three contributors to the Parliamentary Budget Office report titled Cost estimate of a federal dental care program for uninsured Canadians, which estimated the cost of establishing a federal dental care program for uninsured Canadians with a total household income below $90,000. The findings and methodologies presented in this report have informed subsequent policy discussions and the development of the Canadian Dental Care Plan.

== Awards ==
He received the Queen Elizabeth II Diamond Jubilee Medal in 2013 recognizing his contributions to Canadian society.

He was one of six top Canadian health researchers to be appointed to the Governing Council of the Canadian Institutes of Health Research (CIHR) in 2018.

In 2025, he received Ordre des dentistes du Québec Prix Honneur, This award recognizes a significant contribution to improving the general health and oral health of Quebecers
