= ODQ (disambiguation) =

ODQ or Odq may refer to:

- Odq, Zero–direct–quadrature
- Ordre des dentistes du Québec
- The Oxford Dictionary of Quotations
