= John Arundel (ice hockey) =

Canadian ice hockey player

- Born: November 4, 1927 Winnipeg, Manitoba, Canada
- Died: September 19, 2002 (aged 74) North Grenville, Ontario, Canada
- Height: 5 ft 11 in (180 cm)
- Weight: 181 lb (82 kg; 12 st 13 lb)
- Position: Defence
- Shot: Left
- Played for: Toronto Maple Leafs
- Playing career: 1948–1955

John O'Gorman Arundel (November 4, 1927 – September 19, 2002) was a Canadian professional ice hockey defenceman who played three games in the National Hockey League with the Toronto Maple Leafs during the 1949–50 season. The rest of his career, which lasted from 1948 to 1955, was spent in the minor leagues.

== Career statistics ==
=== Regular season and playoffs ===
| | | | Regular season | | | | | Playoffs |
| Season | Team | League | GP | G | A | Pts | PIM | GP | G | A | Pts | PIM |
|---|---|---|---|---|---|---|---|---|---|---|---|---|
| 1944–45 | St. Michael's Majors | OHA | 10 | 3 | 5 | 8 | 10 | — | — | — | — | — |
| 1944–45 | St. Michael's Majors | M-Cup | — | — | — | — | — | 1 | 0 | 1 | 1 | 0 |
| 1945–46 | Oshawa Generals | OHA | 27 | 10 | 8 | 18 | 7 | 12 | 2 | 8 | 10 | 6 |
| 1946–47 | Winnipeg Monarchs | MJHL | 13 | 8 | 9 | 17 | 8 | 7 | 5 | 2 | 7 | 8 |
| 1947–48 | Winnipeg Monarchs | MJHL | 23 | 23 | 26 | 49 | 8 | 11 | 13 | 8 | 21 | 4 |
| 1947–48 | Winnipeg Monarchs | M-Cup | — | — | — | — | — | 6 | 2 | 3 | 5 | 0 |
| 1948–49 | Sydney Millionaires | CBSHL | 60 | 12 | 29 | 41 | 66 | 6 | 0 | 0 | 0 | 0 |
| 1948–49 | Sydney Millionaires | Al-Cup | — | — | — | — | — | 16 | 4 | 6 | 10 | 14 |
| 1949–50 | Toronto Maple Leafs | NHL | 3 | 0 | 0 | 0 | 0 | — | — | — | — | — |
| 1949–50 | Pittsburgh Hornets | AHL | 34 | 0 | 8 | 8 | 17 | — | — | — | — | — |
| 1949–50 | Los Angeles Monarchs | PCHL | 32 | 3 | 10 | 13 | 17 | 17 | 1 | 7 | 8 | 28 |
| 1951–52 | Saint John Beavers | MMHL | 85 | 10 | 21 | 31 | 143 | 10 | 1 | 6 | 7 | 14 |
| 1952–53 | Ottawa Senators | QSHL | 55 | 5 | 14 | 19 | 87 | 11 | 2 | 5 | 7 | 6 |
| 1953–54 | Ottawa Senators | QSHL | 58 | 4 | 4 | 8 | 44 | 22 | 3 | 4 | 7 | 18 |
| 1954–55 | Ottawa Senators | QSHL | 25 | 1 | 5 | 6 | 18 | — | — | — | — | — |
| 1954–55 | Sudbury Wolves | NOHA | 21 | 2 | 7 | 9 | 2 | — | — | — | — | — |
| NHL totals | | | 3 | 0 | 0 | 0 | 9 | — | — | — | — | — |

== Awards and achievements ==
- Memorial Cup Championships (1945 & 1948)
- MJHL First All-Star Team (1948)
- Allan Cup Championship (1949)
