= Theories of craniofacial growth =

Scientific theories

The development of craniofacial growth is a complicated phenomenon that has been the subject of much research for past 70 years. From the first theory in 1940s, many different ideas pertaining to how a face develops has intrigued the minds of researchers and clinicians alike.

== Key concepts ==
Bone Remodeling is characterized by deposition and resorption of bone at different sites of a bone in the body, mostly for renewal and maintenance throughout life. This does not usually lead to change in size or shape of the bone.

Bone Modeling is known as formation of new bone from either cartilage or by direct deposition, mostly during growth and development. This usually does lead to changes in size and shape over time.

Growth Sites is a term proposed by Baume. Growth Sites serve as a location in the bone where the actual growth occurs. Growth sites are dependent on the growth centers for growth. Some examples include sutures of cranial vault, lateral cranial base and maxilla.

Growth Centers is an area in the bone that controls the overall growth of the bone from its locations through different signaling mechanisms. Growth at these centers are genetically controlled. All growth centers can be growth sites but not all growth sites can be growth centers. Some examples include membranous bones of cranium, mandibular condyle.

== Genetic theory ==
This theory was popularized by Allan G. Brodie in 1940s and it states that craniofacial growth is controlled by genetics. This theory states that genes such as Homeobox, Sonic hedgehog, Transcription factor and IHH (protein) play an important role in craniofacial development.

== Bone remodeling theory ==
This theory was popularized by Brash in 1930s and it relies on three principles: 1) Appositional Growth 2) Hunterian Growth 3) Calvarial Growth. Hunterian Growth says that both maxillary and mandibular bones get bone deposition at the posterior surface.

== Sutural theory ==
This theory was popularized by Sicher in 1941 which states that sutures are the primary determinant of the craniofacial growth. Expansion forces at the sutures lead to expansion of bone and thus growth of craniofacial skeleton. Cranial vault increases in size via the primary growth of bone that happens at the suture. Sicher theorized that tissues such as periosteum, Cartilage and sutures are growth centers just like epiphysis of the long bone that allow the bone to form. He said that growth of maxilla happens at expansion of the circumaxillary sutures which push maxilla down and forward. Evidence says that sutures are growth sites that respond intrinsically to signals.

== Cartilaginous theory ==
This theory was popularized by Scott in 1950s and states that cartilage determines the craniofacial growth. Proponents of this theory state that cartilage is responsible for the growth and bone just replaced it. In this theory, mandibular condyle having cartilage at its end allows the downward and forward growth of the mandible. Maxilla, consisting of the nasal septum and nasomaxillary complex, which is made up of cartilage, moves forward and downward also by the forces from the nasal septum. Bones in both maxilla and mandible respond to their respective cartilaginous growth centers. To test this theory, two approaches were taken by researchers in past. Either the cartilage was removed from the nasal septum or the cartilage was transplanted into the cultures to see the effects on the growth. When the cartilage was transplanted into the in vitro cultures, it was found that the cartilage from nasal septum grew as nearly as it did in vivo. In comparison, cartilage from mandibular condyle did not grow as well. Therefore, cartilage at cranial base synchondroses and nasal septum can act as growth centers, while condylar cartilage can't.

== Functional matrix theory ==
The functional matrix hypothesis was popularized by Melvin Moss in 1962. This theory said that neither bone nor cartilage is a major determinant of growth but soft tissue is. His view stated that as soft tissues around the jaw and face grow, bone and cartilage follow the growth of these soft tissues. Dr. Profitt in his Contemporary Orthodontics textbook gave a good example of impact of brain growth on the cranial vault. He states that when the soft tissue of brain grows, the cranial vault follows the growth. Another example is hydrocephaly where increased intracranial pressure leads to increased size of the cranial vault. He also mentioned that when a condylar fracture happens in children there is a chance of about 80% that the condyle will regrow over time. However, 20% of the time the condyle does not regrow because of the extent of the injuries. The extent of trauma and soft tissue scarring can impact the healing of the fractured condyle and thus it shows the functional matrix theory working naturally in real life.

Functional matrix theory states that growth of both maxillary and mandibular bones are dependent of the functional needs of tissues around the bone. Therefore, a normal function is critical for the growth of the maxilla and mandible according to Moss.

== Servosystem theory ==
This theory was popularized by Alexandre Petrovic in 1970s which stated that craniofacial growth happened because of growth signals and feedback mechanisms. Petrovich theorized a Cybernetic Model for the Servosystem Theory. This theory states that occlusion provides a constantly changing input which influences the horizontally regulated growth of the midface and anterior cranial base. This midface growth then serves as a rate limiting factor for the growth of the mandible.

== Enlow's principles ==
There are two principles that Donald Enlow developed which are important part of the study of the craniofacial development. Enlow's V Principle is related to the bones of the craniofacial area which have a V shape configuration. We see bone resorption happening on the outer side of the "V" of the bone and bone deposition happens on the inner side of the "V". Therefore, the movement of bone happens towards the open-end of the V. Enlow's Counterpart Principle states that growth of one bone in the craniofacial area relates to the other bones in the same region. Therefore, each bone and its counterpart bone both grow to a certain extent to maintain the balanced growth. An example is the growth of maxilla corresponding to the growth of mandible.
