= Phil Samis =

Canadian ice hockey player (1927–2022)

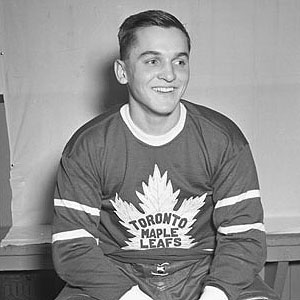
- Born: December 28, 1927 Edmonton, Alberta, Canada
- Died: January 11, 2022 (aged 94) Greater Napanee, Ontario, Canada
- Height: 5 ft 9 in (175 cm)
- Weight: 175 lb (79 kg; 12 st 7 lb)
- Position: Defence
- Shot: Right
- Played for: Toronto Maple Leafs
- Playing career: 1947–1953

Philip Lawrence Samis (December 28, 1927 – January 11, 2022) was an ice hockey defenceman. He played two regular season games in the National Hockey League during the 1949–50 season and five playoff games in 1948, when he won the Stanley Cup, all with the Toronto Maple Leafs. The rest of his career, which lasted from 1947 to 1953, was mainly spent in the American Hockey League. Samis was the last surviving member of the Maple Leafs' 1948 Stanley Cup team.

== Playing career ==
=== Junior career ===
Samis started playing minor hockey in his hometown for the Edmonton Maple Leafs in 1943–44. The next season, he moved to Toronto to attend St. Michael's College and play for the St. Michael's Majors. He helped the team win the 1945 Memorial Cup. Along the way he played with future NHLers like Les Costello, Johnny McCormack, Jim Morrison, Gus Mortson, Tod Sloan and Jimmy Thomson. He was coached by Hockey Hall of Famer Joe Primeau. He would spend the next two seasons with the Oshawa Generals of the OHA.

=== Professional career ===
He turned professional in 1948, signing a contract with the Toronto Maple Leafs. He was assigned to the Pittsburgh Hornets of the AHL. He was called up to the NHL for the playoff run that spring. He played 5 games for the Maple Leafs, helping them win the 1948 Stanley Cup. He was sent back to Pittsburgh at the start of the 1949 season. He did not return to the NHL until 1950 when he was called up for 2 games as an injury replacement. After that, he spent the rest of his career playing in the AHL for the Pittsburgh Hornets and the Cleveland Barons. He helped Cleveland win the Calder Cup in 1951. He retired from hockey in 1953. He briefly came out of retirement and played one season for the Montreal Royals of the QSHL.

== Later life and death ==
After his retirement, Samis became a dentist, studying at McGill University Faculty of Dentistry where he played for the Montreal Royals and was a top student and a Gold Award winner. Additionally, he was Editor-in-Chief of the Dental Review. He died in Greater Napanee, Ontario on January 11, 2022, at the age of 94.

== Career statistics ==
=== Regular season and playoffs ===
			Regular season					Playoffs
Season	Team	League	GP	G	A	Pts	PIM	GP	G	A	Pts	PIM
1943–44	Edmonton Maple Leafs	EJrHL	—	—	—	—	—	—	—	—	—	—
1944–45	St. Michael's Buzzers	OHA-B	9	7	10	17	8	11	4	6	10	32
1944–45	St. Michael's Majors	OHA	9	7	10	17	8	9	3	6	9	36
1944–45	St. Michael's Majors	M-Cup	—	—	—	—	—	2	0	0	0	2
1945–46	Oshawa Generals	OHA	27	11	9	20	83	12	1	3	4	18
1946–47	Oshawa Generals	OHA	27	5	20	25	120	5	0	0	0	20
1947–48	Pittsburgh Hornets	AHL	68	4	10	14	181	2	0	2	2	2
1947–48	Toronto Maple Leafs	NHL	—	—	—	—	—	5	0	1	1	2
1948–49	Pittsburgh Hornets	AHL	60	3	7	10	91	—	—	—	—	—
1949–50	Toronto Maple Leafs	NHL	2	0	0	0	0	—	—	—	—	—
1949–50	Pittsburgh Hornets	AHL	66	2	11	13	139	—	—	—	—	—
1950–51	Cleveland Barons	AHL	64	3	14	17	105	11	2	3	5	21
1951–52	Cleveland Barons	AHL	60	11	14	25	117	5	1	1	2	13
1952–53	Cleveland Barons	AHL	1	0	0	0	0	—	—	—	—	—
1952–53	Montreal Royals	QSHL	56	4	11	15	76	15	0	1	1	15
AHL totals			319	23	56	79	633	18	3	6	9	36
NHL totals			2	0	0	0	0	5	0	1	1	2
