= Luda Diatchenko =

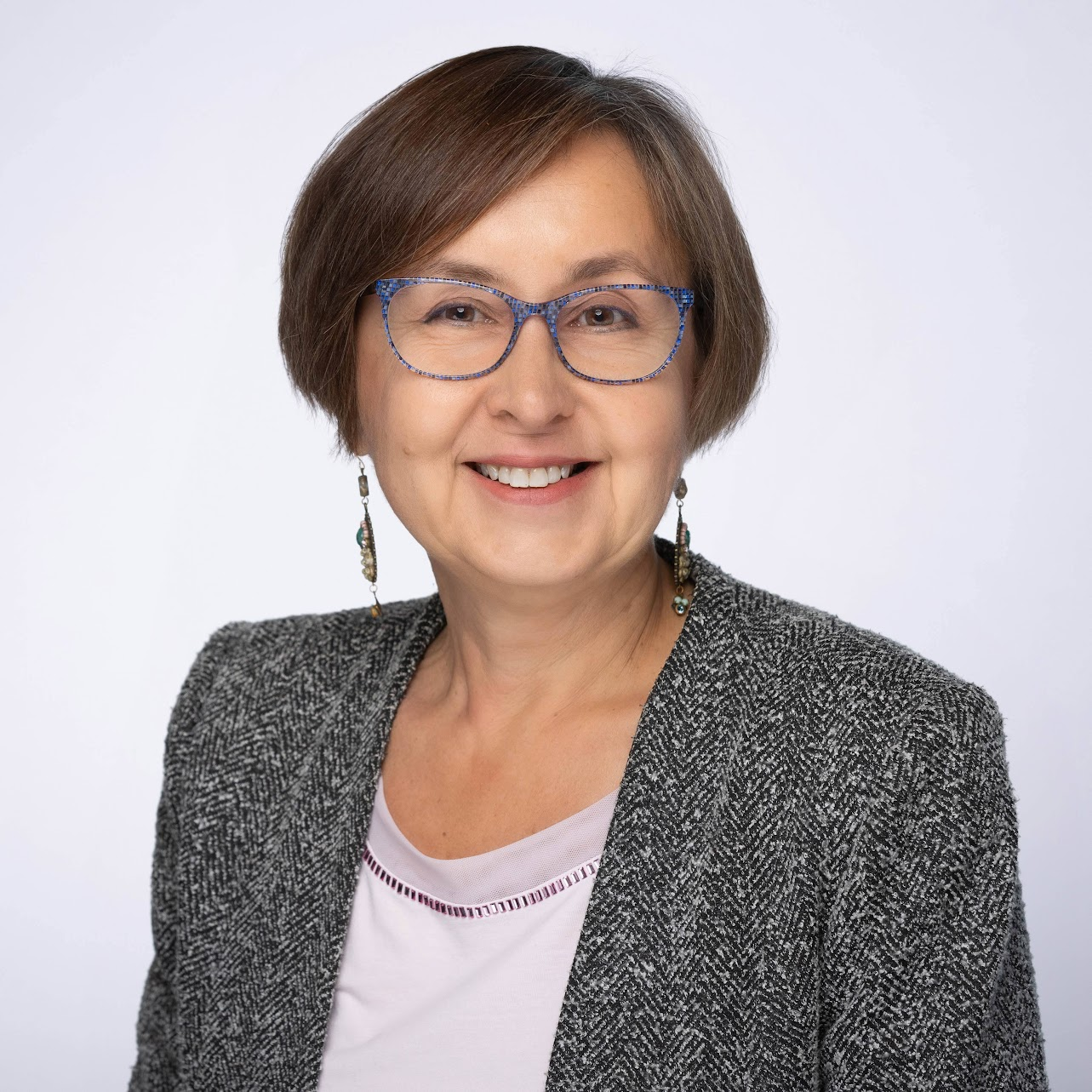
- Born: Moscow, Russia
- Occupations: Professor, McGill University
- Known for: Identifying "pain genes" and biological pathways contributing to human pain
- Awards: Fellow of the Royal Society of Canada

Academic background
- Education: MD and MS, Russian State Medical University, PhD (Molecular Biology), Russian State Medical University; National Cardiology Research Center

Academic work
- Discipline: Molecular Genetics
- Sub-discipline: Human Pain Genetics
- Institutions: Alan Edwards Centre for Research on Pain, McGill University, McGill University Faculty of Medicine, McGill University Faculty of Dentistry
- Notable ideas: Genetic variants of COMT associated with pain sensitivity and the risk of chronic pain conditions; protective role of neutrophil-driven inflammation for pain resolution; individual differences in responses to analgesic drugs driven by genetics
- Website: Human Pain Genetics Lab

Luda Diatchenko is an academic and researcher at McGill University in Quebec, Canada, with a research focus on pain in humans. She is the Canada Excellence Research Chair (CERC) in Human Pain Genetics Laureate and the Fellow of the Royal Society of Canada.

== Education ==
Diatchenko grew up and completed her studies in Moscow, Russia. She completed her MD and Master of Science (Biochemistry) in 1990 from the Russian State Medical University (now known as the Pirogov Russian National Research Medical University). She continued her studies here and at the National Cardiology Research Center, and was awarded a PhD in Molecular Biology in 1993.

== Research and career ==
Diatchenko began her career in industry with 7 years in research and development at CLONTECH Laboratories (now Takara Bio USA) in Palo Alto, California. In 2000, her career in academia began as a Visiting Research Assistant Professor at the Center for Neurosensory Disorders at the University of North Carolina, Chapel Hill. She has continued since then to have roles in both academia and industry. Between 2000 – 2013, she led her research group at the University of North Carolina, becoming a Full Professor in 2013. Since 2013, she has led a research group at McGill University, in Montreal, Canada, in the Alan Edwards Centre for Research on Pain in the Faculty of Dentistry and Medicine. Her recruitment to McGill University included a Canada Excellence Research Chair (CERC), which facilitated her work in creating a Human Pain Genetics Program at McGill. She continues to be involved in industry research through advisory board membership or as a consultant.

Diatchenko pioneered the field of human pain genetics, where she has substantively contributed to the current body of knowledge through her work. Her work has covered genetics and pharmaceutics. Diatchenko has been instrumental in identifying new pain drug targets through a reverse genetic approach that starts with human genetics and genomics, which has led to discovering pain genes and biological pathways that contribute to human pain. Her research program revealed a genetic variation in the human catechol-O-methyltransferase gene with pain sensitivity and the risk of chronic pain conditions (Hum. Mol. Genet., 2004; Science, 2006), individual differences in responses to analgesic drugs being driven by genetics (Hum. Mol. Genet., 2009; Pain, 2020), and the protective role of neutrophil-driven inflammation for pain resolution in patients with acute lower back pain, where inhibiting inflammation leads to short-term analgesia but long-term pain states (Sci.Transt.Med., 2022).

Diatchenko also believes in and contributes to open science to advance our understanding of the molecular mechanisms of pain. Her lab's Human Pain Genetics Database (HPGdb) summarizes all extant data on the genetic contributors of pain and the Transcriptomics Pain Signatures Database (PSGS) summarizes all available data on genome-wide transcriptomics in human pain conditions and experimental pain models. Diatchenko has also been prolific in developing molecular genetic methodologies. She pioneered Suppression Subtractive Hybridization (SSH) nearly 30 years ago, which is still widely used and highly cited times (: Proc. Natl. Acad. Sci., U.S.A., 1996). She and colleagues have also developed a SMART technology (Biochem Biophys Res Commun., 1997), and Factorial reporter system that measures the activities of multiple transcription factors in a living cell. (Nat Methods, 2008)

Diatchenko has been an active member of several professional societies, such as the International Association for the Study of Pain (IASP), playing various roles in multiple committees. At IASP, in 2012, she founded and was Elected Chair of the Special Interest Group (SIG) in Genetics and Pain. She also consults for policy-making agencies such as the National Institutes of Health, the US National Academy of Sciences and the US Surgeon General of the United States.

== Awards and honors ==
- 2023: Fellow of the Royal Society of Canada
- 2022: Fellow of the Canadian Academy of Health Sciences
- 2022: Ronald Melzack Lecture Award by the International Association for the Study of Pain (IASP)
- 2021: NIH Director's Wednesday Afternoon Lecture Series Award
- 2021: Canada Research Chair Tier 1 – Human Pain Genetics
- 2019: Honorary Skou Professor from Aarhus University
- 2013: Canada Excellence Research Chair (CERC) in Human Pain Genetics

== Selected Bibliography ==
- Ao, X; Parisien, M; Fillingim, RB; Ohrbach, R; Slade, GD; Diatchenko, L; Smith, SB (2024). "Whole-genome methylation profiling reveals regions associated with painful temporomandibular disorders and active recovery processes". Pain. 165: 1060–1073. doi:10.1097/j.pain.0000000000003104. PMC 11018476. PMID 38015635.
- Tanguay-Sabourin, C; Fillingim, M; Guglietti, GV; Zare, A; Parisien, M; Norman, J; Sweatman, H; Da-Ano, R; Heikkala, E; Perez, J; Karppinen, J; Villeneuve, S; Thompson, SJ; Martel, MO; Roy, M; Diatchenko, L; Vachon-Presseau, E (2023). "A prognostic risk score for development and spread of chronic pain". Nat Med. 29: 1821–1831. doi:10.1038/s41591-023-02430-4. PMC 10353938. PMID 37414898.
- Jahangiri Esfahani S., Parisien M., Surbey C., Diatchenko L. The Transcriptomics Pain Signature Database. BioRxiv 2023 June 18. doi.org/10.1101/2023.06.16.545337
- Ao, X; Parisien, M; Zidan, M; Grant, AV; Martinsen, AE; Winsvold, BS; Diatchenko, L (2023). "Rare variant analyses in large-scale cohorts identified SLC13A1 associated with chronic pain". Pain. 164: 1841–1851. doi:10.1097/j.pain.0000000000002882. PMC 10348629. PMID 36943258.
- Parisien, M; Lima, LV; Dagostino, C; El-Hachem, N; Drury, GL; Grant, AV; Huising, J; Verma, V; Meloto, CB; Silva, JR; Dutra, GGS; Markova, T; Dang, H; Tessier, PA; Slade, GD; Nackley, AG; Ghasemlou, N; Mogil, JS; Allegri, M; Diatchenko, L (2022). "Acute inflammatory response via neutrophil activation protects against the development of chronic pain". Sci Transl Med. 14 eabj9954. doi:10.1126/scitranslmed.abj9954. PMC 10317000. PMID 35544595.
- Khoury, S; Parisien, M; Thompson, SJ; Vachon-Presseau, E; Roy, M; Martinsen, AE; Winsvold, BS; Mundal, IP; Zwart, JA; Kania, A; Mogil, JS; Diatchenko, L (2022). "Genome-wide analysis identifies impaired axonogenesis in chronic overlapping pain conditions". Brain. 145: 1111–1123. doi:10.1093/brain/awab359. hdl:10852/93644. PMID 34788396.
- Verma, V; Drury, GL; Parisien, M; Özdağ Acarli, AN; Al-Aubodah, TA; Nijnik, A; Wen, X; Tugarinov, N; Verner, M; Klares, R 3rd; Linton, A; Krock, E; Morado Urbina, CE; Winsvold, B; Fritsche, LG; Fors, EA; Piccirillo, C; Khoutorsky, A; Svensson, CI; Fitzcharles, MA; Ingelmo, PM; Bernard, NF; Dupuy, FP; Üçeyler, N; Sommer, C; King, IL; Meloto, CB; Diatchenko, L (2022). "Unbiased immune profiling reveals a natural killer cell-peripheral nerve axis in fibromyalgia". Pain. 163: e821–e836. doi:10.1097/j.pain.0000000000002498. PMC 8942876. PMID 34913882.
- Muralidharan, A; Samoshkin, A; Convertino, M; Piltonen, MH; Gris, P; Wang, J; Jiang, C; Klares, R 3rd; Linton, A; Ji, RR; Maixner, W; Dokholyan, NV; Mogil, JS; Diatchenko, L (2021). "Identification and characterization of novel candidate compounds targeting 6- and 7-transmembrane μ-opioid receptor isoforms". Br J Pharmacol. 178: 2709–2726. doi:10.1111/bph.15463. PMC 10697213. PMID 33782947.
- Benavides, R; Vsevolozhskaya, O; Cattaneo, S; Zaykin, D; Brenton, A; Parisien, M; Verma, V; Khoury, S; Gilron, I; Diatchenko, L (2020). "A functional polymorphism in the ATP-Binding Cassette B1 transporter predicts pharmacologic response to combination of nortriptyline and morphine in neuropathic pain patients". Pain. 161: 619–629. doi:10.1097/j.pain.0000000000001750. PMC 7039325. PMID 31738228.
- Smith, SB; Parisien, M; Bair, E; Belfer, I; Chabot-Doré, AJ; Gris, P; Khoury, S; Tansley, S; Torosyan, Y; Zaykin, DV; Bernhardt, O; de Oliveira Serrano, P; Gracely, RH; Jain, D; Järvelin, MR; Kaste, LM; Kerr, KF; Kocher, T; Lähdesmäki, R; Laniado, N; Laurie, CC; Laurie, CA; Männikkö, M; Meloto, CB; Nackley, AG; Nelson, SC; Pesonen, P; Ribeiro-Dasilva, MC; Rizzatti-Barbosa, CM; Sanders, AE; Schwahn, C; Sipilä, K; Sofer, T; Teumer, A; Mogil, JS; Fillingim, RB; Greenspan, JD; Ohrbach, R; Slade, GD; Maixner, W; Diatchenko, L (2019). "Genome-wide association reveals contribution of MRAS to painful temporomandibular disorder in males". Pain. 160: 579–591. doi:10.1097/j.pain.0000000000001438. PMC 6377338. PMID 30431558.
- Meloto, CB; Benavides, R; Lichtenwalter, RN; Wen, X; Tugarinov, N; Zorina-Lichtenwalter, K; Chabot-Doré, AJ; Piltonen, MH; Cattaneo, S; Verma, V; Klares, R 3rd; Khoury, S; Parisien, M; Diatchenko, L (2018). "Human pain genetics database: a resource dedicated to human pain genetics research". Pain. 159: 749–763. doi:10.1097/j.pain.0000000000001135. PMID 29300278.
- Martin, LJ; Smith, SB; Khoutorsky, A; Magnussen, CA; Samoshkin, A; Sorge, RE; Cho, C; Yosefpour, N; Sivaselvachandran, S; Tohyama, S; Cole, T; Khuong, TM; Mir, E; Gibson, DG; Wieskopf, JS; Sotocinal, SG; Austin, JS; Meloto, CB; Gitt, JH; Gkogkas, C; Sonenberg, N; Greenspan, JD; Fillingim, RB; Ohrbach, R; Slade, GD; Knott, C; Dubner, R; Nackley, AG; Ribeiro-da-Silva, A; Neely, GG; Maixner, W; Zaykin, DV; Mogil, JS; Diatchenko, L (2017). "Epiregulin and EGFR interactions are involved in pain processing". J Clin Invest. 127: 3353–3366. doi:10.1172/JCI87406. PMC 5669538. PMID 28783046.; PMCID: PMC5669538.
- Parisien, M; Khoury, S; Chabot-Doré, AJ; Sotocinal, SG; Slade, GD; Smith, SB; Fillingim, RB; Ohrbach, R; Greenspan, JD; Maixner, W; Mogil, JS; Belfer, I; Diatchenko, L (2017). "Effect of Human Genetic Variability on Gene Expression in Dorsal Root Ganglia and Association with Pain Phenotypes". Cell Rep. 19: 1940–1952. doi:10.1016/j.celrep.2017.05.018. PMC 5524461. PMID 28564610. Review.
- Shabalina, SA; Zaykin, DV; Gris, P; Ogurtsov, AY; Gauthier, J; Shibata, K; Tchivileva, IE; Belfer, I; Mishra, B; Kiselycznyk, C; Wallace, MR; Staud, R; Spiridonov, NA; Max, MB; Goldman, D; Fillingim, RB; Maixner, W; Diatchenko, L (2009). "Expansion of the human mu-opioid receptor gene architecture: novel functional variants". Hum Mol Genet. 18: 1037–51. doi:10.1093/hmg/ddn439. PMC 2649019. PMID 19103668.
- Romanov, S; Medvedev, A; Gambarian, M; Poltoratskaya, N; Moeser, M; Medvedeva, L; Gambarian, M; Diatchenko, L; Makarov, S (2008). "Homogeneous reporter system enables quantitative functional assessment of multiple transcription factors". Nat Methods. 5: 253–60. doi:10.1038/nmeth.1186. PMID 18297081.
- Nackley, AG; Shabalina, SA; Tchivileva, IE; Satterfield, K; Korchynskyi, O; Makarov, SS; Maixner, W; Diatchenko, L (2006). "Human catechol-O-methyltransferase haplotypes modulate protein expression by altering mRNA secondary structure". Science. 314: 1930–3. doi:10.1126/science.1131262. PMID 17185601.
- Diatchenko, L; Slade, GD; Nackley, AG; Bhalang, K; Sigurdsson, A; Belfer, I; Goldman, D; Xu, K; Shabalina, SA; Shagin, D; Max, MB; Makarov, SS; Maixner, W (2005). "Genetic basis for individual variations in pain perception and the development of a chronic pain condition". Hum Mol Genet. 14: 135–43. doi:10.1093/hmg/ddi013. PMID 15537663.
- Lukyanov, K; Diatchenko, L; Chenchik, A; Nanisetti, A; Siebert, P; Usman, N; Matz, M; Lukyanov, S (1997). "Construction of cDNA libraries from small amounts of total RNA using the suppression PCR effect". Biochem Biophys Res Commun. 230: 285–8. doi:10.1006/bbrc.1996.5948. PMID 9016767.
- Diatchenko, L; Lau, YF; Campbell, AP; et al. (June 1996). "Suppression subtractive hybridization: a method for generating differentially regulated or tissue-specific cDNA probes and libraries". Proc. Natl. Acad. Sci. U.S.A. 93: 6025–30. PMC 39182. PMID 8650213.
