= Melvin Moss =

American dentist (1923–2006)

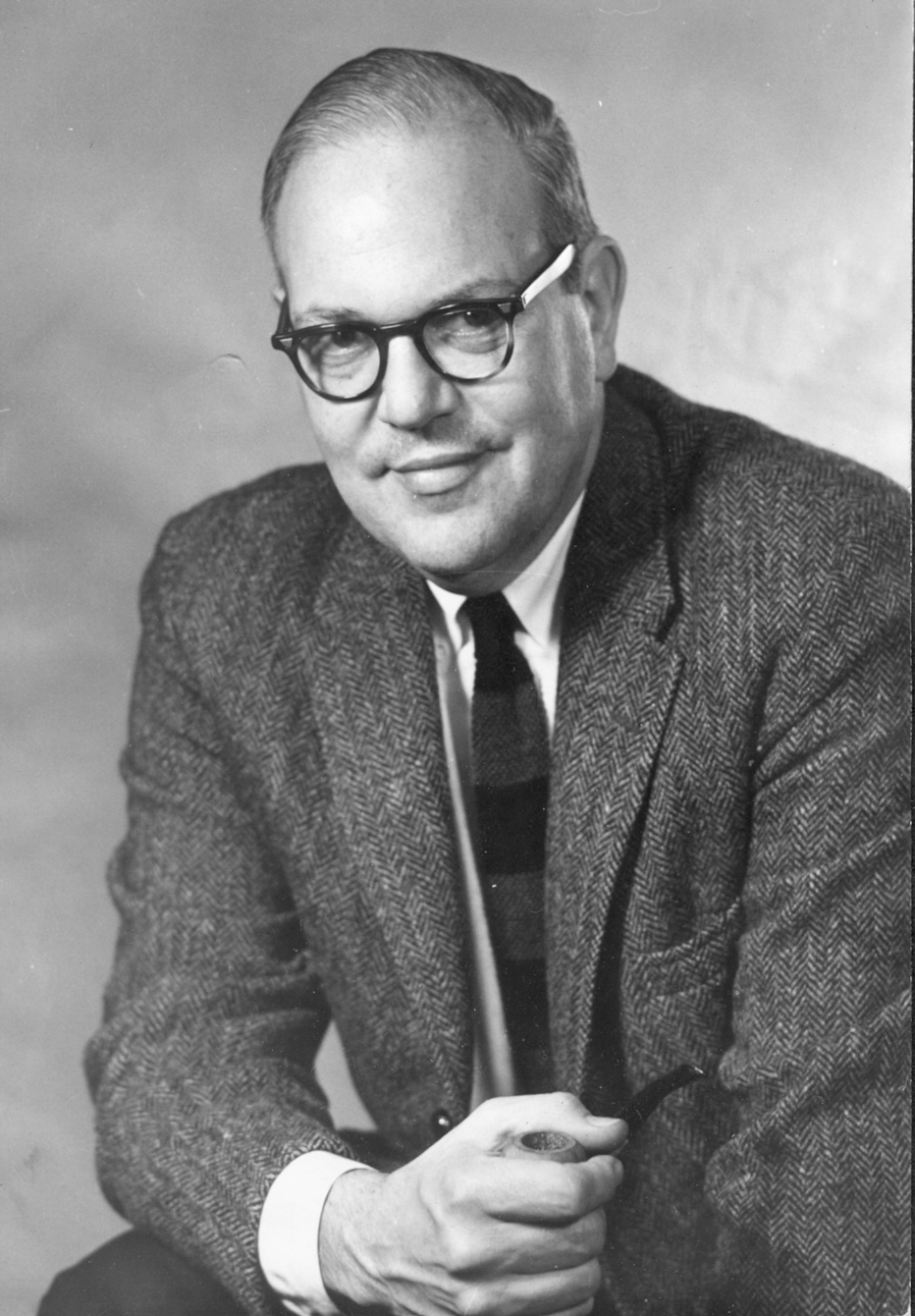
- Dr. Melvin Moss
- Born: January 20, 1923; New York City, New York, U.S.
- Died: June 26, 2006 (aged 83); New York City, New York, U.S.
- Education: Columbia University
- Known for: Functional Matrix Hypothesis
- Scientific career
- Fields: Anatomy; Orthodontics; Biology

Melvin Lionel Moss (1923 – June 26, 2006) was an American dentist known for creating the functional matrix hypothesis for growth and development. He was an anatomist and former dean of Columbia University College of Dental Medicine.

== Career ==
Moss went to New York University and earned an undergraduate degree from there. He then attended Columbia Dental School and obtained his dental degree in 1946. Prior to dental school, he was part of the Dental Corps (United States Army). After his dental degree, Dr. Moss continued studying and received his PhD from Columbia in anatomy, specializing in physical Anthropology in 1954. Thereafter, he joined the school in 1955 as a faculty of anatomy. In 1968, Moss became the Dean of Columbia Dental School. He was also the professor emeritus of anatomy and oral biology in the Columbia University College of Physicians and Surgeons.

Moss created the functional matrix hypothesis which is often used in the speciality of orthodontics. This theory was introduced in 1962 as a chapter in one of the dental textbooks named Vistas in Orthodontics. His work was instrumental in changing the curriculum of Columbia Dental School in 1960s. He placed much value in preventing oral disease and allowed students at the school to be more involved in research. His work was also instrumental in studies of bone formation, cranial growth and congenital bone deformations which were done at the national level.

== Personal life ==
Moss was married to Letty Moss-Salentijn, who was a professor of dentistry and senior Associate Dean in the College of Dental Medicine.

He died in 2006 at the age of 83. He is survived by his wife and his two sons.

== See also ==
- Theories of Craniofacial Growth
