= Functional matrix hypothesis =

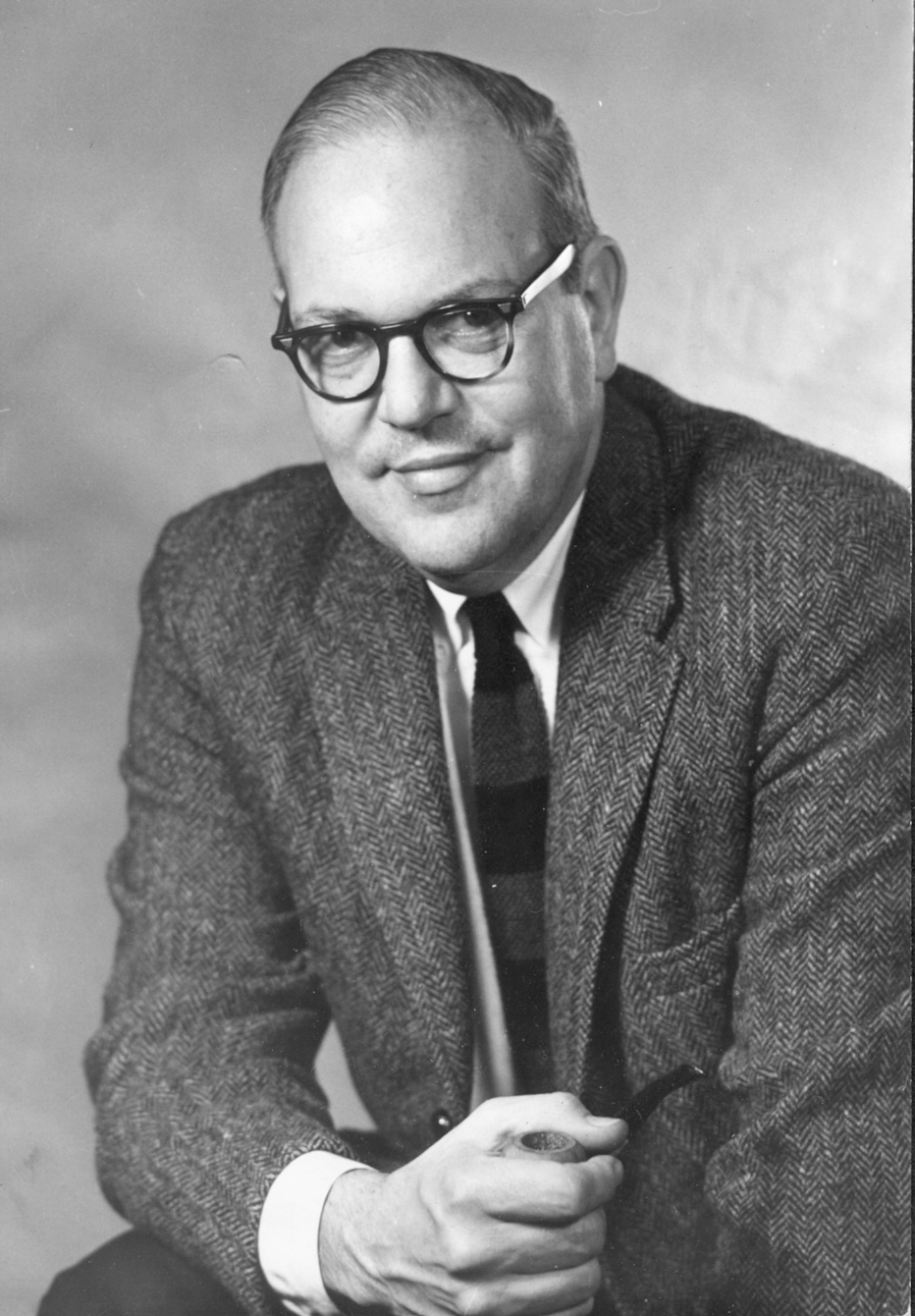
Dr. Melvin Moss, originator of the functional matrix hypothesis.

In the development of vertebrate animals, the functional matrix hypothesis is a phenomenological description of bone growth. It proposes that "the origin, development and maintenance of all skeletal units are secondary, compensatory and mechanically obligatory responses to temporally and operationally prior demands of related functional matrices."

The fundamental basis for this hypothesis, laid out by Columbia anatomy professor Melvin Moss is that bones do not grow but are grown, thus stressing the ontogenetic primacy of function over form. This is in contrast to the current conventional scientific wisdom that genetic, rather than epigenetic (non-genetic) factors, control such growth.

The theory was introduced as a chapter in a dental textbook in 1962.

== See also ==
- Wolff's law
- Theories of Craniofacial Growth
