= 1945 Memorial Cup =

Canadian junior ice hockey championship

The Memorial Cup trophy

The 1945 Memorial Cup final was the 27th junior ice hockey championship of the Canadian Amateur Hockey Association (CAHA). The finals were held at Maple Leaf Gardens in Toronto. CAHA president Frank Sargent chose the location to maximize profits, which were reinvested into minor ice hockey in Canada.

The George Richardson Memorial Trophy champions Toronto St. Michael's Majors of the Ontario Hockey Association in Eastern Canada competed against the Abbott Cup champions Moose Jaw Canucks the Southern Saskatchewan Junior Hockey League in of Western Canada. In a best-of-seven series, held at Maple Leaf Gardens in Toronto, Ontario, St. Michael's won their 2nd Memorial Cup, defeating Moose Jaw 4 games to 1.

== Scores ==
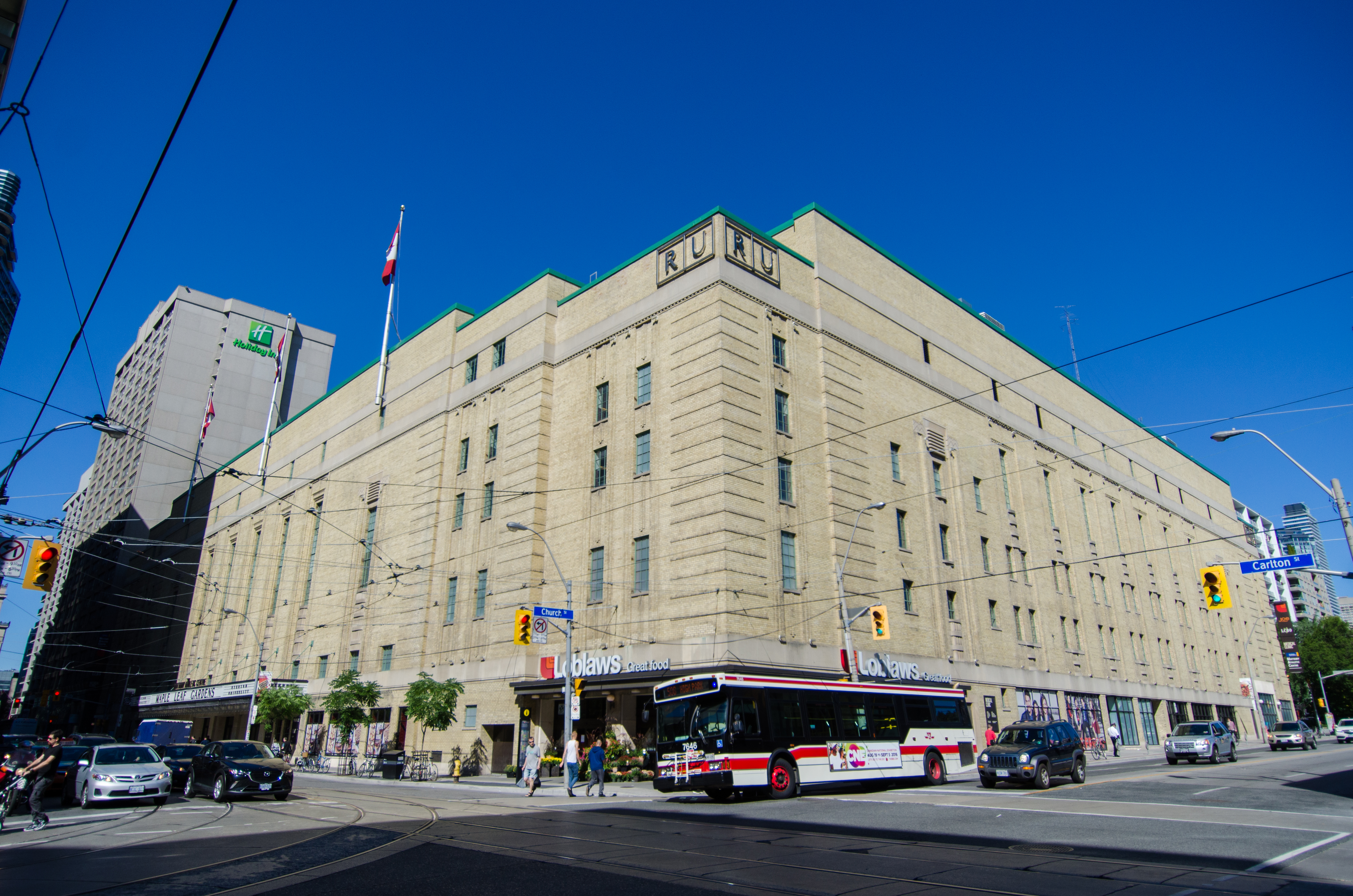
Maple Leaf Gardens

- Game 1: St. Michael's 8-5 Moose Jaw
- Game 2: Moose Jaw 5-3 St. Michael's
- Game 3: St. Michael's 5-3 Moose Jaw
- Game 4: St. Michael's 4-3 Moose Jaw
- Game 5: St. Michael's 7-2 Moose Jaw

== Winning roster ==
John Arundel, John Blute, Pat Boehmer, Les Costello, Leo Gravelle, Bob Gray, Johnny McCormack, Ted McLean, Jim Morrison, Gus Mortson, Bobby Paul, Joe Sadler, Phil Samis, Tod Sloan, Jimmy Thomson, Frank Turik. Coach: Joe Primeau.
