= Ordre des dentistes du Québec =

The Ordre des dentistes du Québec (ODQ) represents all Quebec dentists, both generalists and specialists. It is headquartered in Montreal.

In Quebec, the practice of dentistry is governed by the Dental Act and the Professional Code of Québec. ODQ members are also subject to the Code of Ethics of Dentists. The Order is a member of the Québec Interprofessional Council.

In 2019, the Ordre des dentistes du Québec has more than 5,430 members. The President of the Order is Dr. Guy Lafrance. On October 28, 2019, Dr. Lafrance has been elected for a four-year term.

== Mission ==
The primary goal of the Ordre des dentistes du Québec is to protect the public. Its mission is to ensure the quality of dental services by maintaining high professional and ethical standards, and to promote oral health among Quebecers.

== Background ==
In Canada, the first laws recognizing the practice of dentistry were adopted in 1868, in Ontario, and the following year in Quebec. The Association of Dental Surgeons of the Province of Quebec was founded in 1869. The profession could then regulate professional practice, set minimal competency requirements for practising the profession, determine the content of study programs and practical training, and enter authorized practitioners on its roll of members.

Emma Gaudreau Casgrain became the first woman licensed in Canada to practice dentistry, when the College admitted her in 1898. Her husband, Henri-Edmond Casgrain was a dental surgeon, inventor and vice-president of the College, who trained Gaudreau.

In 1910, the Association of Dental Surgeons of the Province of Quebec became the College of Dental Surgeons of the Province of Quebec (CDSPQ), following the example of the medical profession, which had incorporated as the College of Physicians and Surgeons of Lower Canada in 1843. When the Professional Code took effect in 1973, the CDSPQ became the Ordre des dentistes du Québec.

== Board of directors ==
The Board of Directors of the Ordre des dentistes du Québec consists of 16 directors: the President of the Order, 11 elected members and four directors appointed by the Office des professions du Québec. The Board of Directors is responsible for the general administration of the Order’s affairs and for overseeing the enforcement of the provisions of the Professional Code and applicable regulations. It exercises all the rights, powers and prerogatives of the Order, except those belonging to the general meeting of ODQ members.

== Executive committee ==
The Executive Committee of the Ordre des dentistes du Québec is composed of five members elected from among the members of the Board of Directors: the President of the Order, the Vice-President and three directors, including one director appointed by the Office des professions du Québec. The Executive Committee administers the day-to-day affairs of the Order, and may exercise all the powers delegated to it by the Board of Directors.

== Prix Hommage ==
This annual award recognizes the exceptional contribution by an ODQ member to the development of the profession, in keeping with the Order’s mandate to promote oral health and public protection.

=== Recipients ===
- Dr. Roland Baribeau, 2007
- Dr. Stéphane Schwartz, 2008
- Dr. Jean-Marc Brodeur, 2009
- Dr. Jean-Paul Lussier, 2010
- Dr. Paul Germain, 2011
- Dr. Jacques Valiquette, 2012
- Dr. Denys F. Ruel, 2013
- Dr. Guy Boisclair, 2014
- Dr. Arto Demirjian, 2015
- Dr. Michel Bonin, 2016
- Dr. Denis Forest, 2017
- Dr. Guy Déom, 2018
- Dr. Éric Lacoste, 2019

== Prix Honneur ==
The ODQ’s Prix Honneur is intended, in specific instances, to honour individuals who are not members of the Ordre, companies or non-profit organizations having distinguished themselves by making a significant contribution to the improvement of health among Quebecers, in consideration of the close relationship that exists between overall health and oral health.

=== Recipient ===
- Mr. Jean-Paul Léger, 2013
- Mr. Pierre Blain, 2014

== Publication ==
The Order publishes the Journal de l’Ordre des dentistes du Québec four times a year. The magazine contains columns of interest to members and scientific articles on different aspects of dentistry.

== Annual Convention of the Ordre des dentistes du Québec ==
The Annual Convention of the Ordre des dentistes du Québec, known as the Journées dentaires internationales du Québec (JDIQ), is the largest dental convention in Canada. This important annual event focuses on continuing professional education for all Quebec dentists and the members of their dental teams. In 2019, the JDIQ had 12,715 participants.

Every year, the scientific program for the convention includes a number of workshops and lectures given by internationally renowned speakers. The exhibitors’ booths also have something for everyone in the dental industry.
