= Robert Wiener (dentist) =

Canadian supercentenarian

- Born: 27 October 1908; Montreal, Quebec, Canada
- Died: 17 February 2019 (aged 110); Montreal, Quebec, Canada
- Education: Queen’s University; McGill University (DDS, 1936); University of Chicago (M.S. in pathology)
- Occupations: Oral surgeon, educator
- Known for: Canadian supercentenarian
- Spouse: Ella Wiener (née Levites)
- Children: 3

Robert Wiener (27 October 1908 – 17 February 2019) was a Canadian dentist and oral surgeon, notable for having lived to 110 years of age and 113 days as a validated supercentenarian by the Gerontology Research Group (GRG). At the time of his death, he was recognized as the oldest man in Canada.

== Early life and education ==
Wiener graduated from Baron Byng High School and attended Queen's University in Kingston, Ontario. Wiener earned his DDS from McGill University in 1936, graduating top of his class and receiving the faculty's gold medal, and completed a residency at the Montreal General Hospital. He later obtained a master's degree in pathology from the University of Chicago.

== Career ==
Wiener practiced as an oral surgeon in Montreal and taught dentistry at McGill University for over 25 years. He also established and directed a dental clinic at the Jewish General Hospital dedicated to serving patients of limited means, a hallmark of his 55-year career.

== Personal life ==
Wiener was married to Ella (née Levites) for 72 years until her death in 2011, and the couple had three children. In interviews on reaching age 110, he credited his longevity to staying active, riding his stationary bike and doing weights daily, and following a Mediterranean diet.

== Longevity and legacy ==
Celebrating his 110th birthday in October 2018, Wiener shared memories of growing up playing street hockey on paths plowed by horse-drawn carriages. He lived with remarkable physical and mental health, never suffering serious illness, and remained mentally sharp even in his final years.

Wiener's brother also lived to age 109, and both were part of longevity studies, reflecting a combination of good genes and lifestyle as contributing factors to their long lives.

Upon his death on 17 February 2019, at 110 years and 113 days old, Wiener was validated as a supercentenarian by the Gerontology Research Group and regarded as the oldest man ever born and died in Canada.

His family and former students remember him as intellectually curious and dedicated to community service. His son Neil emphasized that "contributing to your community… those are human qualities that are very important."
