= Typodont =

Dental model of the mouth

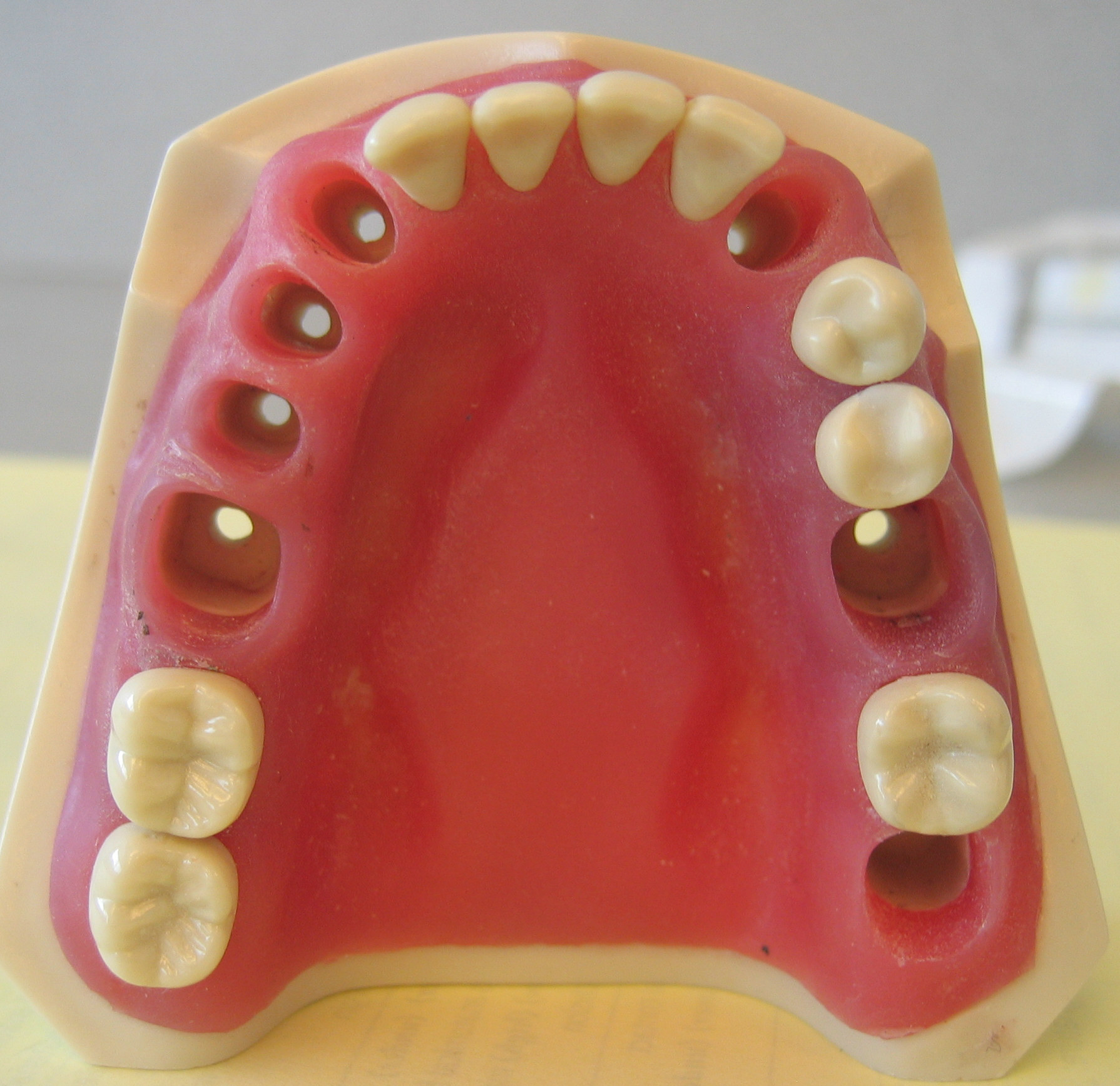
A mandibular typodont with some missing teeth to illustrate the "sockets" and screw holes with which the plastic teeth are held in the typodont.

In dentistry, a typodont is a model of the oral cavity, including teeth, gingiva, and the palate. A typodont is an educational tool for dental and hygienist students, allowing them to safely practice certain dental procedures on the plastic teeth of a model before actually performing the procedures on live patients.

== History ==
Typodonts have been used in clinical settings since the late 1800s. They are widely commercially available.

Generally, typodonts have replaceable, screw-in teeth that are composed of materials that allow students to drill cavity preparations and fill them with restorative material, such as amalgam or composite, or prepare the plastic teeth for crowns and bridges. Starting around the 2020s, researchers have begun to investigate the possibility of using 3D printing to create typodonts that more closely mimic human teeth in appearance, internal anatomy and haptic response.
