= Pocket reduction surgery =

Medical Procedure

In dentistry, pocket reduction surgery is a periodontal surgery performed in order to reduce the probeable depth of the gingival sulcus (known as a periodontal pocket in disease) to allow for less plaque accumulation and greater access for hygiene. Reducing the depths of the periodontal pockets eliminates an environment that is hospitable for the more virulent periodontal pathogens.
