= Alexandre Petrovic =

Serbian scientist (1925–2003)

Alexandre Petrovic (1925 – November 22, 2003) was a scientist who is known for formulating the Cybernetic Theory of Craniofacial Growth in 1977.

== Life ==
Alex was born in Belgrade, Serbia. His father was a Serbian physician who at that time was doing his post-graduate training in surgery at University of Strasbourg School of Medicine. After birth, Alex's mother and him joined their father in Strasbourg where they lived for about 10 years before returning to Belgrade. Petrovic obtained his Medical degree in 1954, did his speciality in hematology in 1957 and his Doctorate in 1961. He completed his a postdoctoral fellowship at McGill University in 1962 under Charles Philippe Leblond on autoradiography, later influencing his methodologies on determining skeletal growth.

He was a professor of physiology and physiopathology at Louis Pasteur University . He also served as a visiting professor at Department of Orthodontics at Louisiana State University School of Dentistry where he taught craniofacial biology and research methodology.

== Career ==
He was the founder and long time director of Research Laboratory for Craniofacial Cartilage and Bone Growth Center. He also helmed the directorship for French Institute of Health and Medical Research. Dr. Petrovic is known for developing a cybernetic model of growth to help understand how the facial growth takes places through the different control processes. Dr. Petrovic was first introduced to American Orthodontic community at Moyer's Growth Symposium at University of Michigan School of Dentistry.

Dr. Petrovic's lab was known to introduce orthodontics to the following ideas

- In 1967, he demonstrated that amount and growth rate of the cartilage in condyle can be changed due to the Orthopedic forces
- Growth categorization of the human tissue level growth can be used as a predictor of jaw growth and treatment outcome when coupled with cephalometric analysis.
