= Canadian Dental Care Plan =

Government dental insurance program

The Canadian Dental Care Plan is a dental insurance program funded by the Government of Canada to provide dentistry services to uninsured Canadians that meet certain criteria. It replaces a temporary dental benefit program established in 2022 for children under 12 who did not have dental insurance coverage, which was terminated in June 2024.

In the 2022 federal budget, the impending program was estimated to cost $1.7 billion annually. The 2023 Canadian federal budget allocated $23 million over two years to collect oral health data for use of the program, $13 billion for Health Canada to implement the program over five years, and $4.4 billion annually thereafter for program costs.

The program began its staggered enrolment rollout in December 2023 with mailings to individuals at least 87 years old.

== Background ==
March 13, 2024: Prime Minister Justin Trudeau makes an announcement on how the new Canadian Dental Care Plan will help millions of Canadians see a dentist. He is joined by Sonja Chamberlin (dean of the Southern Alberta Institute of Technology's School of Health and Public Safety) and George Chahal (MP for Calgary Skyview).

The 2021 federal election resulted in a minority government for the incumbent Liberal Party, led by Justin Trudeau, establishing the 44th Canadian Parliament. Six months later, the New Democratic Party of Canada (NDP), led by Jagmeet Singh, formed a confidence and supply agreement with the Liberal Party to ensure the latter would govern until 2025. The NDP support was contingent on the Liberals agreeing to a set of priorities for the session of Parliament, among them to establish national dental care and pharmacare programs. The dental care program had been a long-standing priority for the NDP, which had campaigned during the 2019 and 2021 federal elections to implement such a program if elected.

In 2020, the Parliamentary Budget Officer estimated it would cost $1.3 billion to implement a similar program. The first year of the program was expected to cost $4.3 billion as those with "unmet dental needs" would obtain care as soon as they became eligible for it.

Heather Carr, president of the Canadian Dental Association, has stated that dentists have wanted a national plan for dental care coverage. About 35% of Canadians do not have private dental care insurance, including more than half of seniors. They would incur an out-of-pocket expense for dental care, which may result in those individuals avoiding dental care.

In 2014, patients with no dental care coverage made over 60,000 visits to emergency departments for oral health issues, resulting in a cost of over $30 million to the health care system. This cost was exacerbated by the fact that emergency departments lacked the tools and training for their medical staff to provide such services.

== Program ==
The program was modelled on the Non-Insured Health Benefits Program provided by the federal government to First Nations and Inuit. Officials stated that complaints about that program, particularly about excessive paperwork for dental clinics, were addressed for the creation of the Canadian Dental Care Plan. In the latter stages of its creation, Minister of Health Mark Holland stated that Health Canada had begun consultations with the Canadian Dental Association and other groups that had agreed to sign a confidentiality agreement, but that provincial and territorial dental associations had refused to sign such agreements. A fixed-fee schedule was established that depends on both the service provided and the province in which it is provided.

The program was released in three phases. The first phase established the temporary Canada Dental Benefit in December 2022 that provided the parents or guardians having an adjusted net income less than $90,000 of children 12 years old and younger who do not have dental coverage a $650 tax-free payment per child each year. Members of Parliament from the Bloc Quebecois and Conservative Party of Canada voted against establishment of the program.

The second phase was the establishment of the Canadian Dental Care Plan providing coverage to individuals less than 18 years old, those over 65 years old, and those with disabilities. During this phase, starting in December 2023 and completing in December 2024, parents of children less than 12 years old could obtain benefits from both the Canada Dental Benefit and the Canadian Dental Care Plan.

The third phase extended the benefits program to all individuals with a net adjusted family income less than $90,000 that had no dental insurance. This phase was expected to provide dental benefits to 8.5 million Canadians and improve dental benefits for 1.4 million Canadians; another 4.4 million will not be covered because they have a net adjusted family income of more than $90,000. It released in June 2025.

== Eligibility ==
Applicants for the Canadian Dental Care Plan must have a net family income less than $90,000, have no other dental insurance coverage (excepting those provided by provincial or territorial governments or the federal government), must be a Canadian resident, and must have filed a tax return the year preceding coverage in the program. Eligible individuals will receive a letter inviting that individual to apply for the program. Once enrolled, eligibility will be verified annually.

Applicants must have an adjusted family net income of less than $90,000. This is calculated by subtracting universal child care benefits (UCCB) and registered disability savings plans (RDSP) from net income exclusive of amounts repaid for those programs. In order to determine eligibility, all employers and pension plan administrators must include on T4 and T4A income tax forms whether the individual or members of their family had access to dental insurance benefits for the reporting tax year. On the T4 form, this will be box 45, and on the T4A form it will be box 015, both of which will specify a code to indicate the scope of coverage available to the individual.

Applications opened for eligible individuals to apply by telephone in December 2023 for those who were 87 and older, in January 2024 for those between 77 and 86 years old, in February 2024 for those between 72 and 76 years old, and in March 2024 for those between 70 and 71 years old. In May 2024, individuals between 65 and 69 years old can submit applications, and the online application system will be launched. In June 2024, applications will be accepted from individuals 18 years old or younger and adults with a Disability Tax Credit certificate. All other eligible Canadians can submit applications in 2025.

Once an individual's eligibility is approved by Service Canada, their personal information will be forwarded to Sun Life Financial to complete the enrollment process.

== Services ==
Oral health services covered by the plan include preventive services, diagnostic services, restorative services, endodontic services, prosthodontic services, periodontal services, and oral surgery. It will not cover cosmetic dentistry services such as tooth whitening or products such as implants or mouthguards.

The dental plan is managed by Sun Life Financial, under a $747 million contract it signed with the federal government. The management contract is for five years, and can be renewed for an additional five years at its expiry. Its system was designed to process about 500,000 applications for program enrolment each month. Once enrolled, the individual will receive a welcome package with a member card, coverage details, start date for their coverage, and information about the program.

Providers may submit claims for services rendered beginning May 2024. Expenses for individuals will be covered from that individual's specified start date. Individuals with adjusted family net incomes of more than $70,000 but less than $80,000 will have to make a 40% copayment, and those with adjusted family net incomes exceeding $80,000 will have to make a 60% copayment. In November 2024, dentists may begin billing the Canadian Dental Care Plan for more complex services that require preauthorization.

A call centre dedicated to the program will be established at Service Canada to deal with issues such as eligibility and coverage.

== Response ==
The program launched in mid-December 2023; by the end of January 2024, over 400,000 applications had been approved, by 6 March over 1 million had been approved, and by 11 April over 1.7 million had been approved. By 19 September, almost 2.5 million Canadians had enrolled in the program, about 751,000 submitted a claim that was covered by the program, and 21,000 dental health providers representing 3/4 of practitioners in Canada had registered with the program.

A survey of licensed dentists in March 2024 by the Canadian Dental Association found that 61% would not register to provide service under the Canadian Dental Care Plan. The government opposed a proposal by dental associations to have patients pay dentists directly, then being reimbursed by the Canadian Dental Care Plan insurance program. In April 2024, the Government of Canada eliminated the requirement for clinics and other dental care providers to register for the program, instead requiring only that "the provider agrees to direct bill Sun Life for services provided under the plan".

The Canadian Dental Hygienists Association has criticized the fee structure, which reimburses dental hygienists at a lower rate than dental clinics operated by dentists.

A report by economist David Macdonald stated that creating a universal service (that is, extending services to all Canadians irrespective of family income) would cost an additional $1.45 billion annually. Don Davies, health critic for the NDP, stated that the NDP wants coverage expanded to universal service.
