= Henri-Edmond Casgrain =

Henri-Edmond Casgrain (August 5, 1846 – 30 October 1914) was a Canadian dental surgeon, inventor, city councillor and the first motorist in Quebec.

Casgrain studied at Collège de Sainte-Anne-de-la-Pocatière from 1857 to 1864 and went on to medical studies at Laval University in Quebec City from 1866 to 1868. Following Laval, he studied dentistry at Pennsylvania College of Dental Surgery in Philadelphia.

== Marriage and training of Canada's first woman dentist ==
In 1879, he married Emma Gaudreau Casgrain. He was 15 years older than Gadreau.

He trained his wife in dentistry. In 1898, she became the first woman in Canada to be admitted to the profession of dentistry, when she graduated from the College of Dentists of Quebec and obtained her license. She practiced until 1920. Casgrain and his wife had an office on Rue Saint-Jean from 1898.

== Other professional leadership ==
Active in the College of Dental Surgeons of the Province of Quebec, Casgrain became vice-president 1904. He also sat on Quebec city council from 1900 to 1904, as alderman of the Palace district. He was buried in the Notre-Dame de Belmont cemetery, where Emma Gadreau Casgrain had an impressive mausoleum built in 1915. Newspapers wrote up his funeral, at the Basilica of Quebec, adding that he had been the first Quebec motorist.

== Inventions ==
Scientific American magazine presented his dentistry invention on March 30, 1895: a small device that allowed the fusion of aluminum with other metals. Casgrain patented the device, which he started using in 1892. He also sold a method of making dentures to the Buffalo Dental Manufacturing Company. In 1896, he patented an acetylene gas lamp. He also patented a machine for making cigarettes.
