= Jocelyne Feine =

Researcher and professor

Jocelyne S. Feine
- Born: USA

Academic background
- Education: DDS, MS, HDR, FCAHS
- Alma mater: University of Texas at Houston

Jocelyne S. Feine (DDS, MS, HDR, FCAHS) is an American Prosthodontist and internationally recognized dental researcher.

Along with her husband, former dean of McGill University Faculty of Dentistry Jim Lund, she is most recognized for her work on the "McGill Consensus Statement" in 2002 which tried to establish an evidence-based standard of care of two implants for mandibular complete dental prostheses.

In 2021, she was recognized as the first ITI (International Team for Implantology) Senior Fellow in Canada.

== Early life and education ==
Jocelyne Feine obtained her DDS degree from University of Texas at Houston in 1980 followed by a Masters of Science in 1987 at the same institution.

== Career ==
Jocelyne Feine is a Professor in the Oral Health and Society Division at the McGill University Faculty of Dentistry. She has authored over 170 peer-reviewed articles, two books, and a dozen invited papers and book chapters and more than 150 abstracts. She has been an international presenter of over 160 times throughout the world.

She is Editor-in-Chief of the JDR Clinical and Translational Research journal.

== Awards ==
She received the prestigious Norton M. Ross Award for Clinical Research in 2016 from the American Dental Association recognizing the impact of her research in the field of implantology.

In 2019, she was presented with an Honorary Doctorate in Dental Medicine from Laval University.

== Personal life ==
She grew up between Pennsylvania and Texas in a family of dentists. She speaks fluent French.
