= Journal of the Canadian Dental Association =

- Discipline: Dentistry
- Language: English, French
- Edited by: John O'Keefe

Publication details
- History: 1935–present
- Publisher: Canadian Dental Association (Canada)
- Frequency: Continuous
- Open access: Yes
- Impact factor: 1.2 (2023)

Standard abbreviations
- ISO 4: J. Can. Dent. Assoc.

Indexing
- ISSN: 1488-2159
- OCLC no.: 818930734

Links
- Journal homepage

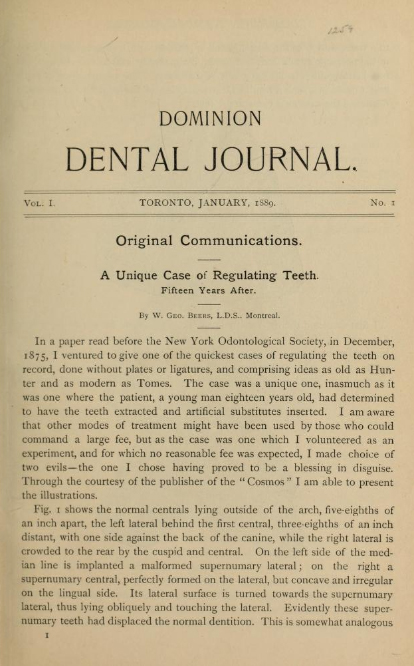
The first issue of the Dominion Dental Journal

The Journal of the Canadian Dental Association is a peer-reviewed open-access medical journal covering dentistry. It is published by the Canadian Dental Association.

== History ==
Published dental literature in Canada was first produced by W.H. Elliot (Montreal), who published 18 papers in the American Dental Journal starting in 1842. In the 1850s there were several attempts to create a Canadian dental journal (the Family Dentist from Brockville and Journal of the Times from Halifax) but none lasted very long.

In 1868, William George Beers (Montreal) published the Canadian Journal of Dental Science. Beers later moved to Hamilton, Ontario where he recruited Curtis Chittenden (a founder of the Ontario Dental Association) as an associate editor. The journal struggled and eventually failed in 1879.

Beers returned to Montreal where in 1889 he launched the Dominion Dental Journal 10 years after the failure of his previous journal. This became Canada's preeminent dental journal and persisted for more than 46 years. In 1935, it was absorbed by the newly created Journal of the Canadian Dental Association and joined with La Revue dentaire canadienne, a French language dental journal that had been founded in 1915 under the editorship of Honoré Thibault. The journal has been published since that time in both English and French.

== The modern journal ==
The modern journal has transformed into a network of knowledge delivery vehicles. The printed journal still exists but it is only one piece of a system that includes the JCDA.ca website, the JCDA Clinical Q&A blogs, and the JCDA Oasis mobile platform. The printed journal is distributed to all dentists and dental students in Canada as well some colleagues outside of Canada.

== Abstracting and indexing ==
The journal is abstracted and indexed in:

- CINAHL
- Current Contents/Clinical Medicine
- EBSCO databases
- Embase
- Index Medicus/MEDLINE/PubMed
- ProQuest databases
- Science Citation Index Expanded
- Scopus

According to the Journal Citation Reports, the journal has a 2023 impact factor of 1.2.

== Major Delivery Networks ==
=== Core Sections (print & web) ===
The journal has three core sections of material:

- Research: A scholarly section of publications that has been peer-reviewed by at least 2 external examiners and consists of information that is novel to the dental literature.
- Clinical Dentistry: A clinically focused section in user friendly formats such as case reports, "point-of-care" and diagnostic challenges. Some of the material will be peer-reviewed while others will be informative/opinion pieces.
- News & Issues: A section dedicated to the news and issues from the Canadian Dental Association and/or provincial dental societies.

=== JCDA Oasis ===
JCDA Oasis was launched in 2011 to create an area for collaboratively edited content, in the Web 2.0 spirit, where rapid publication, dissemination and open dialogue between contributors and readers are pillars of process. JCDA involves organizations (e.g. Organization for Safety, Asepsis and Prevention), industry partners and dentists (e.g. Coronation Dental Specialty Group) to create content then it is opened to discussion with readers. There are three core sections:

- Oasis Discussions: Launched in 2012, Oasis Discussions (previously named Clinical Q&A) is an open forum for discussion of clinical cases, in a blog format with multi-media presentations. Each week, volunteer specialists from across Canada and the United States post open ended questions and research on case management and "hot" topics, the goal of which is to foster lively discussions between professionals.
- Oasis Mobile: A resource created through a collaborative effort of dentists and other professionals from across Canada to offer an "Online Advice and Searchable Information System", OASIS. The site offers concise clinical information and decision supports for everyday practice. The broad categories of information are medical conditions, prescription drugs and dental & medical emergencies
- Case Conferences: Webinar discussions of specific clinical cases.
