= Emma Gaudreau Casgrain =

First woman dentist in Canada

Emma Gaudreau Casgrain (2 June 1861 – 1934) was the first woman to be licensed as a dentist in Canada (1898).

== Biography ==
Gaudreau, born in Montmagny, studied with the Ursulines.

In 1879, she married Henri-Edmond Casgrain (1846–1914), dental surgeon, inventor, alderman and first Quebec motorist.

She trained as a dentist under her husband, a dental surgeon who was 15 years her senior. After graduating from the "Dental College of the Province of Quebec" (predecessor to the McGill University Faculty of Dentistry) in 1898, she became the first woman in Canada to be officially admitted to the profession of dentistry. She practised until 1920.

She and her husband had an office on Rue Saint-Jean from 1898.

She died in 1934. The city of Quebec placed a plaque on the house where she lived at 180 Aberdeen Street.
