= Canadian Dental Association =

Canadian professional association

CDA-ADC
- Canadian Dental Association; Association dentaire canadienne
- Founded: 1902
- Headquarters: Ottawa, Ontario
- Location: Canada
- Members: 18,000
- Website: www.cda-adc.ca

The Canadian Dental Association (CDA; French: Association dentaire canadienne) is a non-profit professional association representing Canada's provincial and territorial dental associations. Headquartered in Canada's capital city Ottawa, the CDA serves its members and the public by managing key oral health issues on their behalf and by coordinating dental health awareness programs across the nation.

CDA is actively involved with lobbying and advocacy initiatives and uses its leadership role to communicate to the public and the government the profession's concerns regarding managed dental care.

== History ==
The CDA was founded in 1902.

Deborah Stymiest of Fredericton was elected as its first female president in 2008.

== CDA Seal Program ==

The CDA Seal is a symbol to help consumers know which oral health benefit claims made by a manufacturer have been independently reviewed and are supported by scientific evidence. The seal is designed to help the public and dental professionals make informed choices. It is based on the dental symbol the Rod of Asclepius, and is surrounded by an interlocking circle and triangle.

== CDA Corporate Membership ==
The Canadian Dental Association is a nationwide professional organization, representing Canadian dentists through its corporate members, who are currently:

- British Columbia Dental Association
- Alberta Dental Association
- College of Dental Surgeons of Saskatchewan
- Manitoba Dental Association
- Ontario Dental Association
- New Brunswick Dental Society
- Northwest Territories and Nunavut
- Nova Scotia Dental Association
- Dental Association of Prince Edward Island
- Newfoundland & Labrador Dental Association
- Yukon Dental Association

Corporate members are provincial or territorial dental organizations that pay a corporate membership fee in order to represent their members' interests on a national basis.

== Leadership ==
=== Presidents ===
- 1902 – F. Arnold Stevenson
- 1902–1904 – J. Bramston Willmott
- 1904–1906 – Eudore Dubeau
- 1906–1907 – Stanley W. McInnis
- 1907–1908 – James M. Magee
- 1908–1910 – Albert E. Webster
- 1910–1912 – Walter D. Cowan
- 1912–1914 – George F. Bush
- 1914–1916 – Frederick W. Barbour
- 1916–1918 – Joseph Nolin
- 1918–1920 – Frank Woodbury
- 1920–1922 – Howard F. Whittaker
- 1922–1924 – Sydney Wood Bradley
- 1924–1926 – George K. Thomson
- 1926–1928 – John W. Clay
- 1928–1929 – Fred J. Conboy
- 1929–1930 – M. Harry Garvin
- 1930–1932 – Alden W. Faulkner
- 1932–1934 – Phillipe Hamel
- 1934–1936 – George L. Cameron
- 1936–1938 – Robert L. Pallen
- 1938–1940 – Stephen A. Moore
- 1940–1942 – William W. Woodbury
- 1942–1943 – Arthur L. Walsh
- 1944–1945 – R. Arthur Rooney
- 1945–1946 – Harvey W. Reid
- 1946–1947 – Victor D. Crowe
- 1947–1948 – J. Kenneth Carver
- 1948–1949 – Howard J. Merkeley
- 1949–1950 – G. Vernon Fisk
- 1950–1951 – Robert P. Lowery
- 1951–1952 – Harold M. Cline
- 1952–1953 – Gustave Ratté
- 1953–1954 – Alphonsus J. Coughlan
- 1954–1955 – Percy G. Anderson
- 1955–1956 – Reyburn R. McIntyre
- 1956–1957 – Kenneth M. Johnson
- 1957–1958 – A. Gerald Racey
- 1958–1959 – George M. Dewis
- 1959–1960 – William G. McIntosh
- 1960–1961 – James P. Whyte
- 1961–1962 – William Miller
- 1962–1963 – M. Vincent J. Keenan
- 1963–1964 – James Zimmerman
- 1964–1965 – Remy Langlois
- 1965–1966 – Philip S. Christie
- 1966–1967 – James P. Coupland
- 1967–1968 – Wesley P. Munsie
- 1968–1969 – Henri Brouillet
- 1969–1970 – Hector R. MacLean
- 1970–1971 – William J. Spence
- 1971–1972 – Louis Bernier
- 1972–1973 – David K. Peters
- 1973–1974 – John E. Abra
- 1974–1975 – J. Fred Reid
- 1975–1976 – H. Lindsay Mussells
- 1976–1977 – Michael J. Cripton
- 1977–1978 – Donald Rife
- 1978–1979 – Roderick L. Moran
- 1979–1980 – Clyde Covit
- 1980–1981 – Gilbert Utas
- 1981–1982 – Donald E. Williams
- 1982–1983 – William Thompson
- 1983–1984 – Robert Hicks
- 1984–1985 – P. Ralph Crawford
- 1985–1986 – Bradley W. Holmes
- 1986–1987 – John Robertson
- 1987–1988 – Ronald J. Markey
- 1988–1989 – Jack Niedermayer
- 1989–1990 – Kevin L. Roach
- 1990–1991 – Gilles Dubé
- 1991–1992 – Leslie S. Allen
- 1992–1993 – Bernard H. Dolansky
- 1993–1994 – Raymond Wenn
- 1994–1995 – Bryun Sigfstead
- 1995–1996 – James R. Brookfield
- 1996–1997 – Barry Dolman
- 1997–1998 – Toby Gushue
- 1998–1999 – Richard Sandilands
- 1999–2000 – John Diggens
- 2000–2001 – Burton Conrod
- 2001–2002 – George Sweetnam
- 2002–2003 – Tom Breneman
- 2003–2004 – Louis Dubé
- 2004–2005 – Alfred Dean
- 2005–2006 – Jack Cottrell
- 2006–2007 – Wayne Halstrom
- 2007–2008 – Darryl Smith
- 2008–2009 – Deborah Stymiest
- 2009–2010 – Don Friedlander
- 2010–2011 – Ronald Smith
- 2011–2012 – Robert MacGregor
- 2012–2013 – Robert Sutherland
- 2013–2014 – Peter Doig
- 2014–2015 – Gary MacDonald
- 2015–2016 – Alastair Nicoll
- 2016–2017 – Randall Croutze
- 2017–2018 – Larry Levin
- 2018–2019 – Michel Taillon
- 2019–2020 – Alexander Mutchmor
- 2020–2021 – James Armstrong
- 2021–2022 – Richard Holden
- 2022–2023 – Lynn Tomkins
- 2023–2024 – Heather Carr
- 2024–2025 – Joel Antel
- 2025–2026 – Bruce Ward

== Publications ==
- Journal of the Canadian Dental Association
- CDA Essentials
