= Royal College of Dentists of Canada =

Royal college in Canada

The Royal College of Dentists of Canada (RCDC, the college; French: Collège royal des chirurgiens dentistes du Canada) is the Canadian national organization dedicated to maintaining high standards of practice and promoting excellence in dental specialties. Established in 1965, the RCDC aims to ensure the quality of dental care in Canada by recognizing qualified dental specialists. It is headquartered in Toronto, Ontario.

As outlined in its Constitution, the Royal College of Dentists of Canada's primary objectives are:

- To promote high standards of specialization in the dental profession.
- To set up qualifications for and provide for the recognition and designation of properly trained dental specialists.
- To encourage the establishment of training programs in the dental specialties in Canadian schools; and
- To provide for the recognition and designation of dentists who possess special qualifications in areas not recognized as specialties.

The college administers the National Dental Specialty Examination (NDSE), which is a critical component in the certification process for dentists wishing to become recognized specialists. This examination is a requirement for provincial licensure within Canada.

RCDC also supports continuing education, professional development, and networking opportunities for its Fellows and Members, fostering collaboration and advancement in the dental profession. Fellows receive the post-nominal letters FRCDC.

== See also ==
- List of Canadian organizations with royal patronage
- National Dental Examining Board of Canada (NDEB)
