= Healthcare scientist =

A healthcare scientist (HCS), or medical scientist, is a scientist working in any of a number of health related disciplines. Healthcare scientists may work directly for health service providers, or in academia or industry. Healthcare scientists typically refers to those contributing directly to clinical services, and not scientists working solely in health related research and development.

== Disciplines ==
Boundaries between healthcare science and other related fields are not strictly defined. There are more than 50 different specialisms. Healthcare scientists work in clinical bioinformatics, life sciences, physical sciences and physiological sciences. A non-exhaustive list of healthcare science roles is below.

- Medical physicist
- Biomedical scientist
- Audiologist
- Clinical cytogeneticist
- Clinical embryologist
- Neurophysiological scientist
- Vascular scientist
- Cardiac scientist
- Sterile processing

== Organization ==
Regulation and organization of healthcare scientists varies significantly from country to country, and from discipline to discipline.

=== Europe ===
==== United Kingdom ====
There are over 50,000 healthcare scientists working in the NHS. Biomedical Scientist and Clinical scientist are a protected title in the United Kingdom, requiring state registration. The Health and Care Professions Council holds the register and regulates the profession. The main routes to registration and training are through courses run by the Institute of Biomedical Science or the National School of Healthcare Science.

=== North America ===
==== United States ====
According to the bureau of labor statistics, there were 120,000 medical scientists working in the United States in 2016.

== See also ==
- Medical laboratory scientist
