= Melbourne Dental School =

Dental school in Victoria, Australia

Coordinates: 37°47′58″S 144°57′52″E

The Melbourne Dental School is one of the graduate schools of the University of Melbourne. In addition to the 4-year graduate dental program the Doctor of Dental Surgery, the school offers specialty training programs combined with the Doctor of Clinical Dentistry degree, advanced training programs, and research degrees including M.Sc. and Ph.D. programs. According to the QS World Rankings, it is the highest ranking dental school in Australia and often ranks among the top 25 in the world.

Professor Alastair J Sloan has been head of the Melbourne Dental School since January 2020.

== History ==
In 1884, a group of dentists formed the Odontological Society of Victoria with the aims of the regulation and education of dentists in the state of Victoria. Mr. John Illife (1847–1914), a member and later president of the Odontological Society of Victoria, was the driving force in negotiations for the regulation of dentistry in Victoria and the establishment of a hospital and college in Melbourne.

Thanks largely to his efforts, the Melbourne Dental Hospital opened its doors in 1890 and was followed in 1897 by the Australian College of Dentistry, devoted solely to the education of dentists.

In 1904, a Faculty of Dental Science was established and the College was affiliated with the University of Melbourne. In 1963, the Faculty and the hospital moved from 193 Spring Street to the new Royal Dental Hospital at 720 Swanston Street, Carlton.

In 1989, the Faculty of Dentistry merged with the Faculty of Medicine (established 1876) to create a new Faculty of Medicine and Dentistry consisting of a School of Medicine and a School of Dental Science. To reflect additional responsibilities, the faculty expanded in 1991 to become the present Faculty of Medicine, Dentistry and Health Sciences.

== Programs ==
=== Graduate programs ===
The Faculty of Dentistry offers formal graduate programs leading to a Doctor of Clinical Dentistry degree (DClinDent) in the following areas:

- Oral and Maxillofacial Pathology and Oral medicine
- Oral and Maxillofacial Surgery (Offered conjointly with a medical degree from the Faculty of Medicine)
- Orthodontics and Dentofacial Orthopaedics
- Pedodontics
- Periodontics
- Prosthodontics
- Endodontics
- Special Needs Dentistry
- Oral Health Promotion (Offered conjointly with an oral health degree from the Melbourne Dental School)

The Faculty also offers graduate programs in Forensic Odontology and Restorative dentistry.

=== Melbourne Model changes ===
- In 2008 and 2009, the School of Dental Science will continue to accept applicants into the 5-year Bachelor of Dental Science (BDSc).
- In 2010, there will be no intake into the Bachelor of Dental Science.
- In 2011, the School of Dental Science will only accept students who have completed a relevant undergraduate degree into the new 4-year graduate-entry dental program which will replace the 5-year Bachelor of Dental Science for training dentists at Melbourne University. Melbourne will be the second dental school in Australia to transition to a 4-year graduate program after the University of Sydney.

=== Research ===
The Melbourne Dental School has a strong tradition in dental research and an established international reputation in several research areas. Research in the school is an integral component of staff and student activities underpinning both the undergraduate and graduate curricula.

The major research activities of the school are conducted by four research groups. This research covers a vast area of scientific research from basic science to clinical studies and involves a range of scientific disciplines.

The school published 46 scientific publications in peer-reviewed journals in 2003 and attracted over $8 million in external grants from government agencies (National Health and Medical Research Council and Medical Research Council, Australian Research Council etc.) and industry.

Research within the school has led to several products, including Recaldent, a unique product which helps prevent and reverse dental decay.

The Melbourne Dental School is one of five participants in the Victorian Centre for Oral Health Science, established in 2003 with an infrastructure grant (major equipment grant) from the Victorian State Government.

The Melbourne Dental School was a core party in the Cooperative Research Centre for Oral Health Science (CRC-OHS) from 2004 - 2010. The success of the CRC resulted in an extension being granted, with the Oral Health Cooperative Research Centre (Oral Health CRC) commencing in January 2010.

In 2009, an Oral Health Therapists Graduate Study was conducted at the Melbourne Dental School. This study was jointly funded by both the Dental Hygienists Association Australia and the Victorian Dental Oral Health Therapists Association. Ethical approval was granted for this study with all findings to be made public in October 2009 on "Research Day."

The Melbourne Dental School is a participant in the Bio21 Institute with research encompassing a wide variety of sub-disciplines, including structural chemistry, bacterial biofilms and peptide vaccine technology

=== Accreditation ===
- Melbourne University Faculty of Dentistry is accredited by the Australian Dental Council and the Royal Australasian College of Dental Surgeons.

== Notable alumni ==
- Prof. P. Raymond Begg AO, Orthodontist, BDSc '23.
- Associate Professor Matthew Hopcraft, BDSc 1994 MDSc 2000 PhD 2010

== The Henry Forman Atkinson Dental Museum ==
The Henry Forman Atkinson Dental Museum contains over 2,500 objects, photographs, documents and catalogues relating to the history of dentistry and dental education in Victoria. Objects in the collection date from the early 18th century and provide insights into the changes and developments within the dental profession and its striving to improve the standard of dental education, dental health and dental care within Victoria.

The Henry Forman Atkinson Dental Museum is located on the ground floor, 720 Swanston Street Melbourne, in the same building occupied by The Royal Dental Hospital of Melbourne.
