= Special needs dentistry =

Dental care for disabled patients

Special needs dentistry, also known as special care dentistry, is a dental specialty that deals with the oral health problems of geriatric patients, patients with intellectual disabilities, and patients with other medical, physical, or psychiatric issues.

Special needs dentists typically have additional postgraduate training after attaining their dental degree. These requirements are dependent on the dentist's country or other jurisdiction. Some countries offer Board Certification in special needs dentistry, such as the American Board of Special Care Dentistry (Diplomate) or the Royal Australasian College of Dental Surgeons (FRACDS (SND), Fellowship).

Oral health therapists have incorporated studies to allow for their scope of practice to cover working with people with special needs. They may accompany a dentist within clinic or domiciliary environments to aid in education, disease control and maintenance of patients with special needs.

Patients who require special needs dentistry may live at home, in hospital, in secure units, in residential or nursing homes, or they may be homeless or vulnerably housed. Their additional needs may be due directly to their impairment or disability, or to some aspect of their medical history that affects their oral health, or because their social, environmental or cultural context disables them with reference to their oral health.

== Special Needs patients ==
=== Cardiovascular Disease ===
For patients with cardiovascular disease, the dental team must have a thorough understanding of common cardiac conditions and how to manage these patients. This is because dental procedures and drugs used in dentistry may aggravate heart disease.

Common cardiovascular conditions that are dealt with in special care dentistry include: hypertension, angina, myocardial infarction and inherited and acquired bleeding disorders. Cardiovascular disease is associated with the following oral implications:

- Periodontitis
- Caries
- Xerostomia

=== Respiratory Disease ===
The two most common respiratory diseases that may be encountered in dental practice are asthma and COPD (Chronic Obstructive Pulmonary Disease).

=== Developmental Disabilities ===
==== Autism ====
Autistic patients have a higher risk of:

- caries
- bruxism
- tongue thrusting
- self-injurious behaviour such as picking at the gingiva or biting the lips
- delayed tooth eruption can be seen in Autistic patients.

==== Cerebral Palsy ====
Patients with cerebral palsy not only struggle accessing dental services and performing oral care. As a result, these patients are often faced with higher levels of untreated disease and tooth loss.

- Poor oral hygiene
- Periodontitis
- Xerostomia resulting from mouth breathing and medications
- Enamel hypoplasia
- Caries
- Drooling
- Dysphagia
- Bruxism
- Fractured teeth

==== Down's Syndrome ====
The majority of patients with Down's Syndrome can be seen in primary dental care with appropriate behavioural management techniques, the degree to which this is successful is entirely dependent on the extent of the learning disability and the cooperation of the patient. Many procedures can be successfully carried out under local anaesthesia but attention should be paid to any pre-existing cardiovascular or neurological conditions. Should the patient be uncooperative or require sedation or general anaesthesia, care can be shared with specialist services. The following oral features are common:

- Delayed dental development and eruption
- Hypodontia
- Microdontia
- Hypocalcification
- High incidence of severe early onset of periodontal disease
- Protruded tongue
- Strong gag reflex

=== Mental Health Conditions ===
This area of special care dentistry is more common in young adults and adolescents.

==== Schizophrenia ====
- Poor self care including diet and oral hygiene
- Xerostomia as a result of antipsychotic medication
- Caries
- Periodontal disease
- Tardive dyskinesias characterised by involuntary muscle movements

==== Bipolar Disorder ====
- Poor oral hygiene
- Increased levels of plaque and calculus
- Increased risk of periodontal disease
- Increased caries
- Xerostomia

==== Depression ====
- Xerostomia (typically due to tricyclic antidepressant medication or due to an anxiety component to the disorder)
- Poor self-care including diet and oral hygiene
- Caries (change in appetite/diet can be a factor in the disorder)
- Periodontal disease
- Oral dysaesthesia (generalised physical aches and pains)

=== Geriatric Patients ===
- Cardiovascular disease
- Diabetes
- Hypertension
- Macular degeneration

When treating the geriatric age group it may not just be situated within the dental practice is can include; independent living, shared housing, assisted living, continuous care communities and nursing homes. The Oral Health Therapist and Dentist are readily needed in these areas to help treat and prevent the further progression of dental disease. Extra empathy must be used when treating geriatric patients as some of them that are being treated may be palliative care or suffering from a severe and enduring mental illness. One of the major obstacles when treating this group of patients is gaining informed consent. Many health care workers in the field consider that the geriatric group can make and assist in their own decision making. Ensuring that the patient is fully adequate in making the informed decision about treatment planning is vital for legality reasonings.

The institutionalised elderly people show a greater number of caries and root caries than other elderly groups.

=== Drug dependent patients ===
The drug dependent patients generally consume large quantity of sugar (especially methadone users) which lead to caries. Their teeth are mostly damaged or lost because of convulsions. They also show high level of anxiety towards dental services.

== In Australia and New Zealand ==
The Australian Dental Council recognized the specialty of Special Needs Dentistry in November 2003.

Among some of the first countries to establish Special Needs Dentistry as a speciality are Australia and New Zealand. There are now a number of training programs, within both countries, which have been established as pathways into this speciality. There are several professional societies in the two nations that provide resources for dental health and advocate for people with special needs.

=== Australian and New Zealand Academy of Special Needs Dentistry ===
This academy is a group of specialists who are registered as Special Needs Dental practitioners in both Australia and New Zealand. This organisation was developed with the intent to establish a network for those involved in Special Needs Dentistry.

=== Australian Society for Special Care in Dentistry (ASSCID) ===
The Australian Society of Special Care in Dentistry was formed in 1997 and currently has 65 representative members within each state and territory of Australia. The objectives of ASSCID include an oral health and special needs educational role for dental professionals and other allied health workers. They act as a resource hub for professionals on the special needs patient and how best to formulate care plans.

=== Australian and New Zealand Society of Paediatric Dentistry (ANZSPD) ===
The Australian and New Zealand Society of Paediatric Dentistry was established in 1988. It is a collaboration of two associations, the Australian Society of Dentistry for Children and the New Zealand Society of Dentistry for Children.

=== Australasian Academy of Paediatric Dentistry (AAPD) ===
The Australasian Academy of Paediatric Dentistry was developed in 1990.

=== Dental Health Services Victoria (DHSV) ===
The principal public oral health organisation in Victoria, Australia, is Dental Health Services Victoria (DHSV). It was founded in 1996 DHSV provides clinical care to patients from the Special Care Unit at the Royal Dental Hospital of Melbourne, via two special dental vans and also through a domiciliary service.

All children enrolled in special or special developmental schools both in urban and rural areas are presented with the opportunity for oral health care at no cost at one or two-year intervals.

== In the United Kingdom ==
Special Care Dentistry (SCD) is the thirteenth and most recent dental speciality to be approved by the United Kingdom General Dental Council (GDC). To date, there are 73 specialists on the GDC specialist list. National Health Service consultant posts in Special Care Dentistry have been set up in some areas of the United Kingdom.

United Kingdom specialists in SCD, and dentists with a special interest in SCD, may work in NHS or private general practice, NHS community/salaried dental services or hospital dental services. People with impairments or disabilities who require Special Care Dentistry may seek a special care dentist by contacting their local healthcare provider (e.g. Primary Care Trust) or by obtaining a referral from, for example, their general medical or dental practitioner. Most SCD services have referral criteria which specify which groups of people they will accept for dental treatment.

Specialist training programmes are being introduced across the United Kingdom to provide training in SCD, leading to admission onto the GDC specialist list. Postgraduate qualifications in SCD are available from institutions such as the Royal College of Surgeons of England, the Royal College of Surgeons of Edinburgh, University College London Eastman Dental Institute and King's College London Dental Institute. There are also post-qualification courses available in SCD for Dental Care Professionals such as dental nurses, hygienists and therapists.

== In the United States ==
Dentists who want to treat patients in the United States with special needs conditions may choose to complete either a 1-year general practice residency (GPR) or advanced education in general dentistry (AEGD) residency program. A GPR program tends to be associated with a hospital and give the dentist the experience of treating patients with special care needs under general anesthesia. One such example of this specialized training is through Rancho Los Amigos National Rehabilitation Program, at Los Angeles County Hospital, in Downey, CA.

Dentists in the United States are not obliged to complete formal post-doctoral residency training because it is not required by local, state, or national governing dental boards. There are various reasons why a dentist does not complete formal post-doctoral residency training, namely, it is not a requirement to practice general dentistry in the United States. However, dentists who desire to treat patients with special needs conditions can still do so with taking continuing education courses. One option to receive training and in-depth special care education is through the organization Special Care Dental Association (SCDA). This organization also offers American Board Certification in Special Care Dentistry.

== International Societies ==
=== International Association for Disability and Oral Health (IADH) ===
The IADH was formed in 1971. It was formerly known as the International Association of Dentistry for the Handicapped, but was altered to its current name to mirror present community terminology.

Every two years since the association was established, the IADH runs an international congress and has members in over 40 countries.

=== Special Care Dentistry Association (SCDA) ===
SCDA was formed by professionals from the Council of Hospital Dentistry, the Council of Dentistry for People with Disabilities and the Council of Geriatric Dentistry. These originally separate councils decided to combine into the SCDA.

The SCDA is an international association that provides educational services, access to resources and networking opportunities. The SCDA promotes for legislation, develops practice guidelines and protocols.

== Academic Journals ==
=== Special Care in Dentistry ===
Special Care in Dentistry Association publishes the journal Special Care in Dentistry. It is an online only publication for dental professionals .

=== The Journal of Disability and Oral Health ===
Published by the British Society for Disability and Oral Health, The Journal of Disability and Oral Health was founded by the International Association of Disability and Oral Health.

== Scope of Practice ==
=== Dentists ===
Special Needs Dentists are practitioners that are concerned with the oral health of people severely affected by intellectual or physical disability, experience profound psychiatric or complex medical issues. They provide treatment which includes assessment, diagnosis, treatment, management and preventative services for people of all ages. The post-graduate training of three years exposes them to scenarios in which there are certain obstacles that must be overcome to provide the treatment necessary.

A special needs dentists may find it typical to perform procedures under general anaesthetic to ensure that the treatment is adequate and optimal. Although the procedures will not change in steps to achieve final product, it may be more advantageous and safer to complete treatment depending on the individual's needs.

=== Oral Health Therapist ===
Oral health therapists (OHT) are dual qualified as a dental therapist and dental hygienist. They provide oral health assessment, diagnosis, treatment, management and preventive services for children and adolescents and, if educated and trained in a program of study approved by the National Board, for adults of all ages. Their scope may include restorative treatment, tooth removal, oral health promotion, periodontal treatment, and other oral care to promote healthy oral behaviours. Oral health therapists may only work within a structured professional relationship with a dentist or dental specialist. The education requirement for a graduate oral health therapist to be registered is a minimum three-year full-time bachelor's degree education program approved by the National Board.

An oral health therapist may aid in performing daily self-maintenance activities for patients who have substantial physical or cognitive limitations, which may hinder their success in major life activities. They have a strong preventive focus and are strongly committed to fostering positive attitudes to oral health. Oral health therapy degrees have incorporated studies to allow their scope of practice to cover working with people with special needs. They may accompany a dentist within clinic or domiciliary environments to aid in education, disease control and maintenance of patients with special needs.

The role of an oral health therapist within any dental practice is multifactorial and involves the fundamentals of oral hygiene instruction, simple restorations, and hygiene treatment. When working with special needs patients the oral health therapists is able to work independently, however when working along a dentist they are able to complete more holistic treatment for the patient.

== Training Required to Become a Special Needs Dentist ==
Special needs dentistry is a challenging, diverse and rewarding aspect of the dental career to be involved in. Before becoming a special needs dentist there is a range of criteria that has to be met first. Firstly, to become a Special Needs Dentist there needs to be adequate knowledge and skills developed in a bachelor's degree to become a general dentist.

=== Australia and New Zealand ===
- La Trobe University Bendigo
- The University of Melbourne
- The University of Adelaide
- Charles Sturt University
- Griffith University
- James Cook University
- University of Newcastle
- University of Queensland
- University of Sydney
- University of Western Australia
- University of Otago.

At all of the above universities there will be training in restorative, endodontics, periodontics, orthodontics and paediatrics. There is a general grasp given about Special Needs Dentistry but this may not suffice for some clinicians. The need thrives and want to become a specialist dentist within any field is highly appreciated, especially working within a team with patients with specials needs.

The pathway to becoming a special needs dentist is as follows: Sustaining primary dental qualifications such as; BDS, BDSc or BDent at a dental school. Application is then made to the above dental schools for enrolment in their post graduate courses.

During obtaining a fellowship in the Special Needs Dentistry field there are a range of case study reports that have to be completed and formulated. One in each of the following categories must be completed to detail the management of patients with:

- Intellectual disability
- Physical Disability
- A patient representing the broad scope of Special Needs Dentistry
- A multidisciplinary approach to treatment; and reflecting the interface between Special Needs Dentistry and at least one of the other specialties of dentistry or medicine.

The Australian and New Zealand Academy of Special Needs Dentistry found that people with disabilities are rarely identified as a priority population group in the public health policy and practice. It is recognised that people with special needs rely on their carers for their dental visits and daily care. Moreover, one study found that carers are confronted with different problems such as, dentists who lack skills in managing people with disabilities. Other complications include inconvenient locations of dental clinics, transport issues and cost of dental treatment.

The Australian Dental Association (ADA) recognised that there are only a few dental practitioners that work to improve the oral health of people with special needs. Not only is their access to care almost non-existent in comparison to the general population, but also the facilities are inadequate and staff lack awareness of oral health matters that may impact those with special needs. Facilities such as general anaesthesia which some patients require for dental treatment, is found to be very limited in the public sector. It can be concluded that access to dental care for this population is not only a barrier physically, but also they are disadvantaged by the lack of equipment and facilities available to achieve dental care.

This population group experience higher levels of oral health disease and poorer access to oral health care. For some, dental access could be influenced by socio-economic disadvantage making it difficult to have treatment. As a result, people with special needs are primarily receiving emergency dental care rather than general dental.

Other possible factors that could contribute to poor access include:

- Access to appropriate oral health information
- Potential negative attitudes to the need to oral healthcare by either the individual or the carers
- Anxiety and fear
- Cost in emotional, financial, psychological and social terms
- Physical access issues, transport or the dental surgery

In saying this, Dental Health Services Victoria (DHSV) has recognised some barriers that prevent dental access for people with special needs. To allow easy access to The Royal Dental Hospital of Melbourne, DHSV has incorporated different strategies. Some include three lifts to all floors of the hospital and incorporating four disabled parking spaces and a wheel chair ramp. For the population who is housebound due to physical disabilities, DHSV has provided a domiciliary oral health service to reduce the challenges that could occur if patients were to travel to the hospital. The dental care provided by this service includes emergency and general dental care such as dental assessments, oral health advice, prevention and extractions. The service is also free if patients have a pensioner Concession care, health care card or a Veteran Affairs Gold card. Victoria DHS.
