= University of Melbourne Faculty of Medicine, Dentistry and Health Sciences =

Medical school in Melbourne, Australia

Coordinates: 37°47′58″S 144°57′32″E

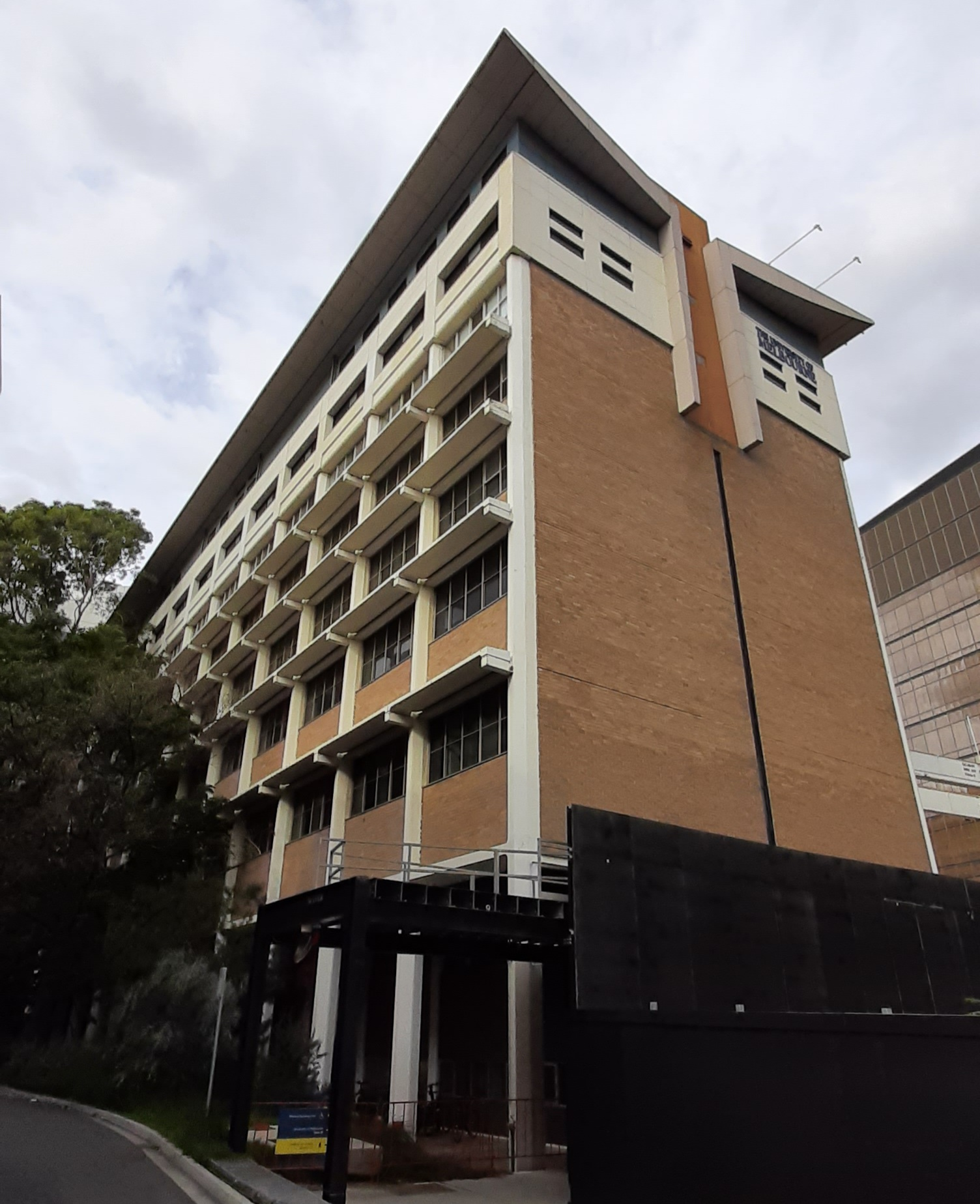
The University of Melbourne medical building

Faculty of Medicine, Dentistry and Health Sciences is the largest faculty of University of Melbourne, with the most post-graduate students, and also hosts the most school departments and centres of all University of Melbourne Faculties, consisting of 52 faculty sub-organisations. In 2021, Melbourne Medical School was ranked 25th in the world and second in Australia in the 2021 QS Subject Rankings.

== History ==
The University of Melbourne's School of Medicine was founded in 1858 by Anthony Brownless, a graduate of the University of St Andrews School of Medicine. By Federation in 1901, the school had become the Faculty of Medicine.

When the Murray Committee reported in 1956 on the inadequacies of the nation's tertiary education sector, the mood to change medical education accelerated. The university was central to the revolution to medicalise society through the expansion of medical services. During the decades to follow, the university was the only tertiary institution to mentor the development of a number of medical institutions in South-East Asia and here in Victoria, the Monash Medical School.

In 1989 the university's Faculty of Dental Science amalgamated with Medicine to become the Faculty of Medicine and Dentistry and later expanded again to include Physiotherapy, Psychology and Nursing. The university established Australia's first School of Population and Global Health in 2001 and then the School of Rural Health in 2002. As of 2016, the faculty also includes the School of Social Work (having moved from the University of Melbourne Faculty of Arts) as well as the Nossal Institute for Global Health.

- In line with the Melbourne Curriculum (formerly the 'Melbourne Model'), the Faculty provides the Bachelor of Biomedicine, a three-year, full-time degree that offers 12 majors across biomedical disciplines.
- For the year of 2016 The University of Melbourne attracted more nationally competitive research funding than any other Australian university.
- In the year of 2010, Medical and Health Sciences at the University of Melbourne achieved the maximum world rating (5) in the Excellence in Research for Australia Report (scale of 1 to 5) in the areas of:
  - Medical and Health Sciences
  - Medical Biochemistry and Metabolomics
  - Cardiovascular Medicine and Haematology
  - Clinical Sciences Dentistry
  - Immunology
  - Neurosciences
  - Oncology and Carcinogenesis
  - Ophthalmology and Optometry
  - Pharmacology and Pharmaceutical Sciences
  - Medical Physiology
- The Melbourne School of Psychological Sciences which forms part of the Faculty is one of the oldest and largest departments of psychology in Australia with its first paper on Psychology written in February 1888 and the Department of Psychology being founded in 1946
- In 2011 the Faculty of Medicine, Dentistry and Health Sciences introduced the Doctor of Physiotherapy as Australia's first three-year entry to practice graduate-level program

== Faculty structure ==
The Faculty of Medicine, Dentistry and Health Sciences encompasses several Schools directly beneath it. Within each School, there are also several Departments, Research Centres, and Institutes, which themselves can also contain several Research Unit sub-organisations which focus on specific research areas. Below is an overview of the faculty's Schools and structure:

=== Melbourne Medical School ===
- Department of Clinical Pathology
- Department of Critical Care
- Department of Medicine and Radiology
- Department of Surgery
- Department of Psychiatry
- Department of Pediatrics
- Department of General Practice
- Department of Rural Health
- Department of Medical Education
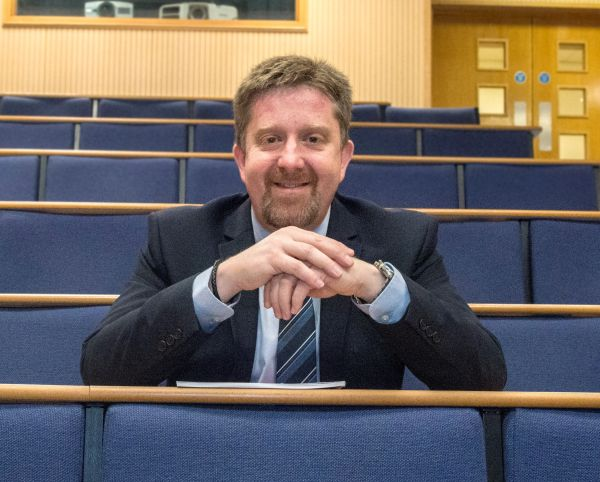
- Alastair Sloan has been head of the Melbourne Dental School since 2020
  Department of Obstetrics & Gynaecology
- Mobile Learning Unit

=== Melbourne School of Health Sciences ===
- Department of Audiology & Speech Pathology
- Department of Nursing
  - Centre for Psychiatric Nursing
- Department of Social Work
- Department of Physiotherapy
  - Centre for Health, Exercise and Sports Medicine
- Department of Optometry and Vision Sciences

=== Melbourne School of Population and Global Health ===
- Centre for Epidemiology and Biostatistics
- Centre for Health Equity
- Centre for Health Policy
- Centre for Mental Health
- Nossal Institute for Global Health

=== Melbourne School of Psychological Sciences ===
- University Psychology Clinic

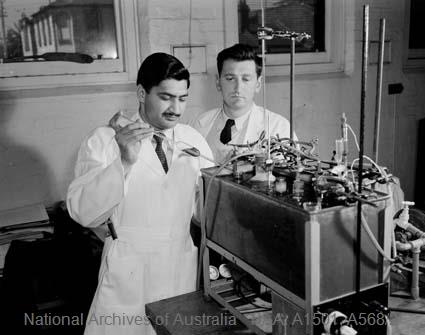
Frank Hird (right) was the third head of the department of biochemistry

=== School of Biomedical Sciences ===
- Department of Anatomy & Physiology
- Department of Biochemistry & Pharmacology
- Department of Microbiology & Immunology
  - Microbiological Diagnostic Unit

=== Faculty Institutes, Centres and Departments ===
- Health & Biomedical Informatics Centre
- Melbourne Poche Centre for Indigenous Health
- Melbourne Neuroscience Institute
- The Peter Doherty Institute for Infection and Immunity (Doherty Institute)
- Centre for Youth Mental Health
- Walter and Eliza Hall Institute of Medical Research (WEHI)
- Florey Institute of Neuroscience and Mental Health
- Medical Bionics Department
- The Sir Peter MacCallum Department of Oncology
- Peter MacCallum Cancer Centre
- Burnet Institute
- Murdoch Children's Research Institute
- St. Vincent's Institute of Medical Research
- Centre for Digital Transformation of Health

== Research ==
The University of Melbourne was ranked ninth in the world in clinical, pre-clinical and health subjects by the 2018 QS World University Rankings. The Faculty is highly active with over 1400 researchers in eight broad research domains encompassing the breadth of medicine, dentistry and the health sciences.

As of 2016, some examples of research outcomes from the University of Melbourne School of Medicine, Dentistry, and Health Sciences include the Stentrode a collaboration between the University of Melbourne, the Royal Melbourne Hospital and the Florey Institute of Neuroscience and Mental Health, and prosthetic body parts that can simulate touch sensations to amputees.

The Ultrasound Education Group (UEG) is a research and education group within the Department of Surgery, founded by Alistair and Colin Royse in 2004.

UEG's research topics are transthoracic echocardiogram; transesophageal echocardiography for cardiac surgery; clinical point of care diagnostic ultrasound for heart, vascular, lungs, abdomen, invasive procedures. Other areas of research include cardiothoracic surgery; cardiothoracic anaesthesia; postoperative quality of recovery in surgery; and self-directed learning with ultrasound simulators.

UEG research outcomes include:

- Patients in heart surgery have better probabilities of survival if arteries from their chest wall and arms are used to replumb their heart, instead of leg veins. By scrutinising 51,000 Australian patients, Melbourne researchers discovered the risk of dying prematurely was at least 22 per cent higher if any leg vein was used in coronary bypass surgery
- Cardiac surgery relies heavily on donated blood because of the high blood transfusion rates. But a major study of over 5,000 heart surgery patients has now shown that surgeons can safely use significantly less blood than they have been. The potential saving is equivalent to around one blood donation (about 470 millilitres) per moderate-to-high risk patient.

== Criticisms ==
In 2010 the Faculty drew criticism from the Australian Medical Students' Association (AMSA) over its decision to alter its course structure to allow full fee paying domestic student places:

"The Bradley report into Higher Education stated that participation by students from low socio-economic backgrounds in higher education in Australia needs to be increased. The Federal Government and Universities have been working hard to achieve this aim, which AMSA strongly supports. So for one of Australia's leading Universities to make an active decision to disadvantage students from low socio-economic backgrounds is very disappointing and will undermine much the good work being done around the nation", said Ross Roberts-Thomson, AMSA President. This alteration from labelling the course from "undergraduate" to "post-graduate" was seen as a way of avoiding the Australian Governments ban on full fee paying places for Undergraduate degrees, and as increasing potential barriers for applicants from low socio-economic background from enrolling.

== Present and past Faculty Deans ==
Below is a List of all Faculty of Medicine, Dentistry and Health Science Deans from 1876 to present.

- 1876–1886 George Britton Halford
- 1886–1889 Harry Brookes Allen
- 1890–1896 George Britton Halford
- 1897–1924 Harry Brookes Allen
- 1925–1929 Richard James Arthur Berry
- 1929–1938 William Alexander Osborne
- 1939–1943 Peter MacCallum
- 1944–1945 Robert Marshall Allan
- 1946–1947 Roy Douglas Wright
- 1947–1949 Peter MacCallum
- 1950–1952 Roy Douglas Wright
- 1953–1971 Sydney Sunderland
- 1971–1977 Sydney Lance Townsend
- 1978–1985 David Geoffrey Penington
- 1986–1995 Graeme Bruce Ryan
- 1995–1997 Gordon James Aitken Clunie
- 1998–2003 Richard Graeme Larkins
- 2003–2013 James Alexander Angus
- 2013–2015 Stephen Kevin Smith
- 2015–2016 Mark Hargreaves
- 2017–2021 Shitij Kapur
- 2021–Present Jane Gunn
