= Matthew Hopcraft =

Australian dentist, public health academic and television cook

Associate Professor Matt Hopcraft
- Born: Matt Hopcraft; 1971 (age 54–55)
- Education: BDS, MDS, BA, Ph.D.
- Alma mater: University of Melbourne
- Occupation: Dentist
- Years active: 1995–present
- Television: MasterChef Australia
- Title: Associate Professor in Professional Practice, Melbourne Dental School
- Term: 2017 -
- Spouse: Erika
- Children: Two

Matt Hopcraft (born 1971) is an Australian dentist, public health academic and television cook.

== Early life ==
Hopcraft was raised in country Victoria and attended Mooroopna Secondary College. He has the degrees of Bachelor of Dental Science, Master of Dental Science and Doctor of Philosophy from the University of Melbourne, and Bachelor of Arts from Deakin University.

== Career ==
Upon graduation, Hopcraft served as a Dental Officer in the Australian Army, and worked in both public and private dental practices.

Hopcraft was the Director, Assessments and Examinations at the Australian Dental Council and is an Honorary Clinical Associate Professor at the Melbourne Dental School of The University of Melbourne. He was a member of the Council of the Victorian branch of the Australian Dental Association from 2005 to 2016, President in 2011 and a federal councillor for 2 years. He is currently co-director of Sugar-free Smiles, an organisation raising awareness of the health impacts of high sugar diets and advocating for the introduction of a tax on sugar-sweetened beverages.

He has been widely cited by the media on matters related to dental health.

Hopcraft is currently associate professor in Professional Practice at the Melbourne Dental school, and was formerly the CEO of the Australian Dental Association Victorian Branch.

== MasterChef ==
Hopcraft was selected in the Top 24 contestants in the 2015 reality television cooking program MasterChef Australia. He was eliminated on 16 July 2015, finishing in sixth place. His post-MasterChef career saw him release a cookbook in June 2017 called Food to Feed the Family. (ISBN 136420018X)

In 2025, Hopcraft returned to compete amongst 24 previous contestants in MasterChef Australia series 17. He was eliminated on 18 May, finishing 20th.

== Awards ==
- 2004 – Colonel MGT Kenny Award for exemplary service to the Royal Australian Army Dental Corps
- 2010 – IADR Geriatric Oral Research Award – Post-doctoral Category

== Publications ==
Hopcraft has been widely published since 2003. A list of his academic publications and presentations is available at The University of Melbourne website.
