= Royal Dental Hospital of Melbourne =

The Royal Dental Hospital of Melbourne

Geography
- Location: Carlton, Victoria, Australia
- Coordinates: 37°47′58″S 144°57′52″E

Organisation
- Type: Teaching

Services
- Speciality: Dentistry

History
- Former name: Melbourne Dental Hospital
- Opened: 12 September 1890

Links
- Lists: Hospitals in Australia

The Royal Dental Hospital of Melbourne (RDHM) is based in Carlton, just north of Melbourne's CBD, and provides general, specialist and emergency dental care to all eligible Victorians. It is also a teaching hospital, which means patients may be treated by a variety of dental professionals, students, specialists in training, or other qualified staff.

== History ==
=== Early history ===
First established as the Melbourne Dental Hospital, the facility began treating patients on 12 September 1890 from its location at 225 Lonsdale Street, opposite the Melbourne Hospital. The hospital was staffed by volunteer dentists – a result of tireless work by community-spirited dentist John Iliffe The hospital has relocated a number of times over the years. In 1897 it moved to 189-191 Lonsdale Street where it shared a location with the Australian College of Dentistry. In 1907 the hospital moved to the newly built Australian College of Dentistry building at 193 Spring Street.

=== War years ===
During the First World War, dental students at the Hospital gave up their lectures and worked 12-hour days to complete 5,000 fillings and 8,000 extractions, readying recruits for military service and giving free treatment to returned soldiers. At the end of the Second World War the Hospital obtained ex-RAAF huts which it erected behind the Spring Street building and used as a prosthetics department. As early as 1951 plans were announced for a large new government-funded Dental Hospital to be located Grattan Street, Parkville in front of the Royal Melbourne Hospital, but it wasn't completed until 1963.

=== Name change and current location ===
In 1969 the hospital's name was changed to The Royal Dental Hospital of Melbourne and, in 2003, it moved to its current location at 720 Swanston Street Carlton, opposite the University of Melbourne. It is now home to the Melbourne Dental School, the Henry Forman Atkinson Dental Museum, the RMIT University Department of Health and Biosciences, and the Cooperative Research Centre for Oral Health Science. It is operated by Dental Health Services Victoria which coordinates the delivery of public oral health services throughout Victoria on behalf of the Victorian Government's Department of Health.

== Services ==
The hospital provides a range of dental services to eligible members of the public including:

- Emergency dental care to all members of the general public;
- General care including fillings, dentures and preventative care to current healthcare and pensioner concession cardholders;
- Specialist dental care including orthodontics, oral and maxillofacial surgery, endodontics, periodontics, prosthodontics, pediatric dentistry and oral medicine; and
- Education of students from The University of Melbourne, RMIT University, and La Trobe University to educate Victoria's future oral health professionals. The hospital also provides bridging programs for overseas-trained clinicians seeking registration.
