= MasterChef Australia series 7 =

MasterChef Australia
- Season 7
- Judges: Matt Preston; George Calombaris; Gary Mehigan
- No. of contestants: 24
- Winner: Billie McKay
- Runner-up: Georgia Barnes
- No. of episodes: 62

Release
- Original network: Network Ten
- Original release: 5 May – 27 July 2015

Series chronology
- ← Previous; Series 6 Next → Series 8

The seventh series of the Australian cooking game show MasterChef Australia premiered on 5 May 2015 on Network Ten.

This series was won by Billie McKay in the grand finale against Georgia Barnes on 27 July 2015. The announcement of the winner was watched by 2.2 million metro viewers, making it one of the most watched shows of 2015.

== Changes ==
Shannon Bennett took on the role of guest mentor, guiding contestants participating in Immunity Challenges, the role Kylie Kwong held in series 6. Unlike the sixth series, the advantage for the Immunity Challenge was now handed to the contestant's choice instead of the chef. The use of the power apron was now reduced to one day in a week only and it passed down to the next contestant who excelled in the subsequent challenge.

== Contestants ==
=== Top 24 ===
The Top 24 were revealed on 5–6 May 2015. Prior to the first competition round, Mario Montecuollo was disqualified after his five-month professional kitchen experience violated the show's guidelines of the auditions. The producers investigated the contestant's position as a head chef at his bar in Enmore and discovered that Montecuollo had been working one day a week as a paid cook for five months within the past years. Casual participants were allowed to audition without working previously in a professional kitchen for more than six weeks, ruling him ineligible to compete in the show. He was replaced by Jessie Spiby, who had originally missed out on the Top 24 in the second episode.

Contestant	Age	State	Occupation	Status
Billie McKay	24	NSW	Restaurant Manager	Winner 27 July
Georgia Barnes	27	QLD	Health Product Rep	Runner-up 27 July
Jessica Arnott	29	WA	Food Sales Assistant	Eliminated 26 July
Reynold Poernomo	21	NSW	Student	Eliminated 23 July
Sara Oteri	26	WA	Advertising Creative	Eliminated 20 July
Matthew Hopcraft	43	VIC	Dentist	Eliminated 16 July
Jessie Spiby	28	SA	Graphic Designer	Eliminated 9 July; Returned 25 June; Eliminated 25 June
Ashleigh Bareham	23	QLD	Childcare Worker	Eliminated 6 July
Amy Luttrell	29	TAS	Hairdresser	Eliminated 2 July
Rose Adam	38	SA	Workplace Trainer	Eliminated 29 June
Stephen Rooney	31	NSW	Recruitment Specialist	Eliminated 22 June
John Carasig	36	VIC	Flight Attendant	Eliminated 18 June
Jamie Ward	30	VIC	Construction Project Manager	Eliminated 15 June
Jacqui Ackland	40	VIC	Medical Scientist	Eliminated 11 June
Anna Webster	28	VIC	Student	Eliminated 8 June
Ava Stangherlin	23	NSW	Visual Merchandiser	Eliminated 4 June
Kristina Short	28	TAS	Customer Service Manager	Eliminated 1 June
Melita Tough	41	VIC	Stay-at-home Mum	Eliminated 28 May
Fiona Grindlay	31	QLD	Marketing Manager	Eliminated 25 May
Jarrod Trigg	29	VIC	Civil Engineer	Eliminated 21 May
Andrea Farinha	18	NSW	Student	Eliminated 18 May
Kha Nguyen	25	VIC	Retail Sales Assistant	Eliminated 14 May
James Bell	23	QLD	Financial Analyst	Eliminated 11 May
Marcus Cher	31	VIC	Freelance Industrial Designer	Eliminated 8 May
Mario Montecuollo	38	NSW	Bar Owner	Disqualified 7 May

Future appearances

- In Series 8 Billie McKay appeared as a guest judge for both a Mystery Box and an Invention Test challenge, while Reynold Poernomo appeared as a guest judge for a Pressure Test.
- In Series 9 Reynold appeared as a guest chef for an Immunity Challenge, where he won against contestant Callan Smith.
- In Series 10 Billie appeared at the auditions to support the top 50 while Reynold appeared as a guest chef for an Immunity Challenge, although contestant Khanh Ong opted to cook against Series 8 runner-up Matt Sinclair instead. Reynold later appeared at the Semi Finals dinner service as a guest along with Georgia Barnes, Jessica Arnott, Sara Oteri, Matthew Hopcraft, Jessie Spiby, Ashleigh Bareham, Rose Adam, Jamie Ward, Ava Stangherlin & Kha Nguyen.
- Reynold appeared on MasterChef Indonesia (season 5) as a guest judge as well as the brother of judge Arnold Poernomo.
- In Series 11 Billie was brought onboard one of three mentors for the Immunity Challenges.
- Reynold & Rose appeared on Series 12. Rose was eliminated on May 5, 2020, finishing 19th and Reynold was eliminated on July 19, 2020, finishing 3rd.
- Reynold appeared on Series 13 as a guest judge for an elimination challenge.
- John Carasig appeared on Series 14 along with Billie, who competed for a chance to win the title for the 2nd time. John was eliminated on May 8, 2022, finishing 21st. Billie won the competition on 12 July 2022, making her the first contestant ever to win the show twice.
- In Series 14, Reynold appeared as a guest judge for a Pressure Test.
- Reynold competed on the Dessert Masters spin off series. He was runner up on 28 November 2023.
- Matthew appeared on Series 17 and was eliminated on May 18, 2025, finishing 20th.

== Guest chefs ==
Week	Guest Judge	Challenge
1	Brent Owens	Top 24 Mystery Box Challenge
1	Massimo Bottura	Team Challenge
2	Sat Bains	Pressure Test
2	Ben Williamson	Immunity Challenge
3 (Marco Week)	Marco Pierre White	All Challenges & MasterClass
3 (Marco Week)	Josh Pelham	Immunity Challenge
3 (Marco Week)	Curtis Stone	MasterClass
4	Maggie Beer	Mystery Box Challenge & Invention Test
4	Anna Polyviou	Pressure Test
4	Duncan Welgemoed	Immunity Challenge
4	Benjamin Cooper	Elimination Challenge
5 (Superstars Week)	Poh Ling Yeow	Mystery Box Challenge
5 (Superstars Week)	Hayden Quinn	Invention Test
5 (Superstars Week)	Kylie Millar	Pressure Test
5 (Superstars Week)	Callum Hann	Immunity Challenge
5 (Superstars Week)	Andy Allen	Team Challenge
5 (Superstars Week)	Ben Milbourne	Team Challenge
5 (Superstars Week)	Justine Schofield	Elimination Challenge
5 (Superstars Week)	Poh Ling Yeow	MasterClass
5 (Superstars Week)	Callum Hann	MasterClass
6	Curtis Stone	Invention Test
6	Marcus Wareing	Pressure Test
6	Nick Holloway	Immunity Challenge
8	Heston Blumenthal	Mystery Box Challenge & Invention Test
8	Guillaume Brahimi	Pressure Test
8	Jim McDougall	Immunity Challenge
8	Bernard Chu	Team Challenge
8	Darren Purchese	Team Challenge
8	Christy Tania	Team Challenge
8	Kirsten Tibballs	Team Challenge
9	Janice Wong	Pressure Test
9	Ross Lusted	Immunity Challenge
9	Andy Groneman	Team Challenge
9	Rick Stein	Elimination Challenge
10	Darren Purchese	Pressure Test
10	Monty Koludrovic	Immunity Challenge
10	Jaclyn Koludrovic	Immunity Challenge
11 ("Marco Returns" Week)	Marco Pierre White	All Challenges & MasterClass
12	Grant King	Pressure Test
12	Brett Graham	Pressure Test
Finals	Heston Blumenthal	Grand Finale

== Elimination chart ==
No.	Week	1			2		3		4		5		6		7				8		9		10		11		Finals			
No.	Mystery Box Challenge Winner	Jessica; John; Sara			Georgia		Ashleigh		Melita		John		John		Jessie (Power Apron)				Sara		Rose		Billie		None		Sara		Georgia	
No.	Invention Test Winner	None			Ashleigh; Jessica; Reynold		Billie; Georgia; Matthew		Billie; Jessie; John		Anna; Ava; Georgia		Jacqui; Jessica; Matthew		Reynold; Billie; Jessie; Sara				Ashleigh; Matthew; Rose		Jessica; Jessie; Sara		Georgia; Jessie; Reynold; Sara		Georgia; Jessica; Sara		Billie; Georgia		Georgia	
No.	Immunity Challenge	None			Lose: Ashleigh		Lose: Georgia		Lose: John		Lose: Anna		Lose: Jessica		Win: Billie; Lose: Jessie				Win: Ashleigh		Lose: Jessie		Lose: Jessie, Reynold		Lose: Georgia		None		None	
1	Billie	Top 24	IN	Team Win	IN	Team Win	Top 3	Team Win	Top 3	Team Lose	IN	Team Win	Btm 3	Btm 5	Top 4		P.A.	T.W.	IN	Team Lose/Imm.	IN	Team Lose 2	Btm 4	Top 4	Team Lose	Top 2	Top 2	Btm 3	Top 2	WINNER
2	Georgia	Top 24	IN	Btm 3	Btm 4	Team Lose	Top 3	Team Lose	IN	Team Win	Top 3	Team Lose	IN	Team Lose	IN		Team Lose		Btm 3	Team Win	IN	Team Lose 2	Top 4	Btm 3	Team Win	Top 2	Top 2	ADV	Top 2	Runner-up
3	Jessica	Top 24	Top 3	Btm 5	Top 3	Team Win	IN	Team Win	IN	Team Win	IN	Team Lose	Top 3	Team Win	IN		Team Win		IN	Team Win	Top 3	Team Win	Btm 4	Top 4	Team Win	Btm 4	Btm 3	Btm 3	3rd	Eliminated (Ep 61)
4	Reynold	Top 24	IN	Team Lose	Top 3	Team Win	IN	Team Win	IN	Team Win	IN	Team Win	IN	Team Win	Top 4	P.A.	Team Win		IN	Team Win	Btm 3	Team Win	Top 4	Btm 3	Btm 2	Btm 4	Btm 3	Elim	Eliminated (Ep 60)	
5	Sara	Top 24	Top 3	Team 2nd	IN	Btm 4	IN	Team Win	IN	Team Win	IN	Team Lose	IN	Team Win	Top 4		Team Lose		IN	Btm 2	Top 3	Team Win	Top 4	Top 4	Team Win	Btm 4	Elim	Eliminated (Ep 57)		
6	Matthew	Top 24	IN	Team Win	IN	Team Lose	Top 3	Team 3rd	IN	Team Win	IN	Team Win	Top 3	Team Lose	Btm 3		Btm 2		Top 3	Team Lose	Btm 3	Team Lose 1	Btm 2	Top 4	Btm 2	Elim	Eliminated (Ep 55)			
7	Jessie	Return	IN	Team 2nd	IN	Team Win	IN	Team Win	Top 3	Team Win	IN	Team Lose	IN	Team Win	P.A.	Top 4	Team Win		IN	Elim	Top 3	Btm 2	Top 4	Elim	Re-eliminated (Ep 50)					
8	Ashleigh	Top 24	IN	Btm 5	Top 3	Team Lose	IN	Team Win	IN	Btm 6	Btm 3	Team Win	Btm 3	Btm 3	IN		T.W.	P.A.	Top 3	Team Win	IN	Team Lose/Imm.	Elim	Eliminated (Ep 47)						
9	Amy	Top 24	IN	Team Lose	IN	Btm 4	IN	Team Lose	IN	Team Win	IN	Team Win	IN	Team Win	Btm 4		Team Win		Btm 3	Team Win	IN	Elim	Eliminated (Ep 45)							
10	Rose	Top 24	IN	Team 2nd	Btm 3	Btm 2	IN	Team Win	Btm 3	Btm 3	Btm 3	Team Win	IN	Team Win	IN		Team Lose		Top 3	Team Lose	Elim	Eliminated (Ep 42)								
11	Stephen	Top 24	IN	Team 2nd	IN	Team Win	IN	Team 3rd	IN	Btm 6	IN	Team Lose	IN	Btm 3	Btm 3		T.L.	Saved	Elim	Eliminated (Ep 37)										
12	John	Top 24	Top 3	Team Win	IN	Team Lose	Btm 3	Team Lose	Top 3	Team Win	IN	Team Lose	IN	Team Win	IN		Elim		Eliminated (Ep 35)											
13	Jamie	Top 24	IN	Team 2nd	Btm 3	Team Win	IN	Team 3rd	Btm 4	Team Lose	IN	Team Win	IN	Btm 5	Elim		Eliminated (Ep 32)													
14	Jacqui	Top 24	IN	Team Win	IN	Team Lose	Btm 3	Team 3rd	Btm 3	Btm 3	IN	Btm 2	Top 3	Elim	Eliminated (Ep 30)															
15	Anna	Top 24	IN	Team 2nd	IN	Team Lose	IN	Team Win	IN	Team Lose	Top 3	Team Win	Elim	Eliminated (Ep 27)																
16	Ava	Top 24	IN	Team Win	IN	Team Win	IN	Team 3rd	IN	Btm 6	Top 3	Elim	Eliminated (Ep 25)																	
17	Kristina	Top 24	IN	Team Lose	IN	Team Win	IN	Team Win	IN	Team Win	Elim	Eliminated (Ep 22)																		
18	Melita	Top 24	Top 5	Team Win	IN	Team Lose	IN	Team Win	IN	Elim	Eliminated (Ep 20)																			
19	Fiona	Top 24	IN	Team Win	IN	Team Win	IN	Btm 2	Elim	Eliminated (Ep 17)																				
20	Jarrod	Top 24	IN	Team 2nd	IN	Team Win	IN	Elim	Eliminated (Ep 15)																					
21	Andrea	Top 24	IN	Team Win	DNP	Team Win	Elim	Eliminated (Ep 12)																						
22	Kha	Top 24	Top 5	Btm 3	IN	Elim	Eliminated (Ep 10)																							
23	James	Top 24	IN	Team 2nd	Elim	Eliminated (Ep 7)																								
24	Marcus	Top 24	IN	Elim	Eliminated (Ep 5)																									
25	Mario	DSQ	Disqualified (Ep 3)																											
	Eliminated	Mario (Jessie)	None	Marcus	James	Kha	Andrea	Jarrod	Fiona	Melita	Kristina	Ava	Anna	Jacqui	Jamie		John		Stephen	Jessie; 1st elimination	Rose	Amy	Ashleigh	Jessie; Re-elimination	None	Matthew	Sara	Reynold	Jessica	Georgia; 80 points
	Eliminated	Mario (Jessie)	None	Marcus	James	Kha	Andrea	Jarrod	Fiona	Melita	Kristina	Ava	Anna	Jacqui	Jamie		John		Stephen	Jessie; 1st elimination	Rose	Amy	Ashleigh	Jessie; Re-elimination	None	Matthew	Sara	Reynold	Jessica	Billie; 82 points (win)

== Episodes and ratings ==
Colour key:
– Highest rating during the series
– Lowest rating during the series

Ep#/Wk-Ep#	Original airdate	Episode Title / Event	Total viewers (5 Metro Cities)	Nightly Ranking	Ref.
Week 1
1/01-1	Tuesday, 5 May 2015	Series Premiere: Auditions Part 1 – Season 7 started with a challenge for the contestants to cook their signature dish in one hour, vying for automatic entry into the Top 24. Gary, Matt and George judged the competitors with either "yes" or "no", with their votes deciding whether the contestant would stay in the competition. 15 contestants received three yes votes and won their way through to the main competition, while 16 others, who received either one or two yes votes, were given a second chance and cooked again in the next episode.	1,231,000	#1	
2/01-2	Wednesday, 6 May 2015	Auditions Part 2 – Sixteen second chance contestants were given the chance to get the nine remaining spots in the Top 24, in two challenge rounds. In the first round, an invention test, the contestants had 75 minutes to cook a dish using ingredients from one of three different world food markets, and the 8 best dishes won their makers a spot in the main competition. James' dish earned positive praise and he received an apron during the tasting. The other seven contestants who received aprons were Georgia, Mario, Billie, Andrea, Jamie, Amy and John. The remaining eight faced a pressure test set by Shannon Bennett for the one remaining spot in the Top 24. They had two hours to create his layered Warm Chocolate Orange Mousse, with a number of technical elements, including tempered chocolate. Rose's version was declared the best and she won the last apron.	1,029,000	#4	
3/01-3	Thursday, 7 May 2015	Top 24 Mystery Box Challenge – Before the first challenge, the show disqualified Mario for his five month professional experience as a paid chef, which violated the guidelines of the auditions. With his removal, Jessie was brought back to replace him. The contestants were given a choice of three mystery boxes, with one picked by each judge with series six winner Brent Owens as the guest judge. Cooking with ingredients chosen blindly and with 75 minutes on the clock, some contestants struggled with the pressure of their first challenge, while others thrived. Of the five standout dishes, it was Jessica, John and Sara who were declared the Top 3 and won an advantage in their next challenge.	926,000	#7	
4/01-4	Thursday, 7 May 2015	Massimo Bottura Team Challenge – Massimo Bottura brought the Top 24 their first team challenge, in which they had three hours to make an Italian main course and dessert for a restaurant of 40 guests, with the worst performing team facing elimination. Jessica, John and Sara were team captains and initially designed menus. John and Sara's teams decided to simplify their dishes, while Jessica's Red Team kept going with their plan to make fresh fettuccine. John's White Team received overall positive reviews in both their main and dessert. Despite serving the judges some raw fish and missing a table during service, on the whole, Sara's Green Team impressed. Ultimately, while having skillful elements in their dishes, the Red Team's fettuccine was too chalky and dry while the strawberry element of their dessert did not impress. Those flaws were enough of a disappointment to land them in elimination.	999,000	#4	
5/01-5	Friday, 8 May 2015	Fish Elimination Challenge – The losing team from the previous challenge faced a three-round elimination challenge based on fish. In the first round, the eight contestants were tasked with naming twenty Australian fishes, one by one. The first five to incorrectly name a fish moved to round 2. In the second round, the remaining contestants had 4 minutes to fillet and pin-bone a whole snapper, with the three worst moving to the final round. Georgia, Kha and Marcus faced off in the final round and given 45 minutes to cook a fish dish of their choice. Kha's Tuna with Potatoes and Vinaigrette was appreciated but labeled too simple, and Georgia had overcooked her fish, but she impressed the judges with all other elements. Marcus faced many problems during his cooking time, delivering a half finished dish and despite being praised on the cooking of his fish, his other elements failed to impress, and a single bone was found in his flathead fillet, resulting in his elimination.	777,000	#6	
Week 2
6/02-1	Sunday, 10 May 2015	Mystery Box Challenge and Invention Test – Andrea withdrew from the day's challenges due to sickness and therefore went through to the pressure test. The remaining contestants faced a mystery box challenge with ingredients including popcorn, blood orange and coriander, with only five dishes being tasted by the judges. Ashleigh, Sara, Georgia, Billie and Reynold were selected as the Top 5, with Georgia's Crumble with Chamomile Meringue and Creme Patissiere and Blood Orange Curd giving her the win and the ability to choose the invention test core ingredient. From a 'guilty pleasure' selection she chose chocolate (over bacon and cheese) and the contestants had 90 minutes to cook a dish, with the Top 3 going to the immunity challenge, and the Bottom 3 going to the pressure test. Most of the contestants excelled with such a well-used ingredient, and Reynold, Jessica and Ashleigh were declared the Top 3, while Georgia, Jamie, James and Rose failed to impress with their dishes. However, the flavours in Georgia's dish eventually saved her as Jamie James and Rose joined Andrea in the pressure test.	1,146,000	#3	
7/02-2	Monday, 11 May 2015	Pressure Test: Sat Bains' Beef and Mushrooms – Andrea, James, Jamie and Rose had two and a half hours to recreate Sat Bains' technical dish, "Beef and Mushrooms", to avoid elimination. Andrea's mushroom ketchup had the wrong consistency, leading her to leave it off the dish, while Rose forgot to make her pickled onions and had some issues plating the dish. Ultimately, both of their dishes were praised, despite missing some elements. Jamie's dish impressed, but his sauce lacked depth of flavour and his tartare lacked cornichons. Even though James had all the elements, despite neglecting to taste each component during the cook, he received negative feedback from the judges due to technical issues. The theory is that none of his elements balanced together correctly and therefore, James was eliminated.	1,046,000	#5	
8/02-3	Tuesday, 12 May 2015	Immunity Challenge: Ben Williamson – In the first round, Ashleigh, Jessica and Reynold had to make a dish using a jaffle iron. Ashleigh won the round with a "Jaffa jaffle", and moved to the Immunity Challenge round against Brisbane chef Ben Williamson. Ashleigh decided to use an 'eastern-inspired' pantry and with 75 minutes, cooked a Thai chicken curry with lychee relish and Roti. Ben prepared a pan-fried duck with Kimchi, Puffed millet with Daikon and a Nashi pear salad. Ashleigh was praised for the depth of flavour in her dish and her lychee relish, but her rice was undercooked and the Roti dry. Ben's dish was criticised for a lack of depth in his Kimchi, but the rest of his dish was well received, ultimately giving him the win, 16 points to 15.	1,212,000	#1	
9/02-4	Wednesday, 13 May 2015	Puckapunyal Team Challenge – The remaining 22 contestants travelled to Puckapunyal Army Base for a team challenge, cooking for 120 Army personnel, Legacy guests and their families. The two teams had a total of four hours preparation and service time to cook and individually plate a two-course meal, a main and a dessert. Being their first challenge in a commercial kitchen, contestants rose to the challenge and delivered all around excellent dishes, impressing their guests. Both teams delivered knockout desserts, the Red Team's golden syrup semifreddo with anzac crumble being met with acclaim from the judges. However, they served uneven and undercooked lamb compared to the Blue Team's perfectly cooked beef eye fillet, and it was this that sent them to the elimination challenge.	1,037,000	#5	
10/02-5	Thursday, 14 May 2015	Two-Round Elimination Challenge: Salad and One-Rule – The eleven contestants from the losing team faced a two-round elimination challenge, and in the first of which, they to make a centrepiece salad in 30 minutes. Georgia, Ashleigh and Jacqui made the 3 best salads, while Amy, Kha, Rose and Sara made the four worst. In round 2, the four contestants had to each choose one rule (area of cuisine, type of protein, cook time, cooking method) for the challenge from three options. With 45 minutes to cook Vietnamese-style quail on the stove-top, Sara and Amy shone, producing exemplary dishes. And while Rose overcooked her quail, Kha undercooked his and his dish lacked flavour, making him the third contestant to be eliminated.	1,025,000	#2	
Week 3 – Marco Week
11/03-1	Sunday, 17 May 2015	Marco's Mystery Box Challenge and Invention Test – Marco Pierre White brought his version of a mystery box, which consisted of ten ingredients that make up five fundamental flavours: sweet, sour, bitter, salty and umami. With 60 minutes to them, Ashleigh, Georgia, Jessica, John and Sara were chosen as the Top five by Marco and the judges, with Ashleigh winning the challenge. Her advantage in the invention test was to choose one of five basic sauces (for example, Bechamel and Hollandaise) that had to underpin the contestants' next dish. Ashleigh chose Veal Jus, and it was the quality of this sauce that determined the top and bottom dishes. Billie, Georgia and Matthew impressed with their inventive dishes, while Andrea, Jacqui and John's dishes were not well received and put them in the bottom 3.	1,043,000	#5	
12/03-2	Monday, 18 May 2015	Pressure Test: Lamb Noisettes à la Forestiere with Madeira Sauce – Andrea, Jacqui and John had two and a half hours to recreate Marco's dish, including preparing the Noisettes from scratch out of a saddle of lamb after a demonstration of how to 'break it down' from Marco. Jacqui had some problems with her meat, ultimately presenting it with the skin still on. John impressed with his approach and final dish, getting praise across the board. After falling behind early despite departing from the recipe, Andrea ran out of time while plating her dish and her lamb was cooked inconsistently. That was enough to seal her elimination.	1,129,000	#6	
13/03-3	Tuesday, 19 May 2015	Immunity Challenge: Josh Pelham – In the first round, Billie, Georgia and Matthew had to make a simple dish using a single egg and their choice of pantry items. Georgia won the round with her fried egg, black bean and tomato salad, with goat cheese cream, and moved to the Immunity Challenge Round against Josh Pelham from Estelle in Melbourne. Georgia decided to use a 'food from below the ground' pantry and with 75 minutes, make a seafood and fennel broth with prawns and scallops. Georgia was praised for the flavour of her broth, but her prawn was undercooked. Josh's dish of marron and mussels with truffles and leeks was praised, and although Marco didn't like salmon caviar, Josh edged out Georgia 33 points to 31.	1,204,000	#1	
14/03-4	Wednesday, 20 May 2015	Relay Team Challenge – The contestants were split into four teams of five and were tasked with a relay-style challenge, in which each member had 15 minutes to cook and 45 seconds to transfer information. Billie, Jacqui, Jarrod and Melita, the captains of the Red, Yellow, Blue and Green Teams, respectively, chose the dish and started off the challenge. Jarrod chose to make a coconut mussel broth, Melita chose to cook lobster medallions with a seafood broth, Billie chose to make a stuffed chicken thigh with a fennel and carrot puree, and Jacqui decided to make Mexican corn tacos. During three changeovers, the Yellow Team attempted to create a new component to replace the corn tacos when a core ingredient, masa flour, was not found in the pantry. In the Green Team, Rose's choice to pour too much wine in the bisque made it overly acidic, which led to Kristina restarting the dish with a stronger base. In the Blue Team, John changed the entire dish by adding other ingredients for new components (White Chocolate Velouté with Scallop Tartare), which only confused the last two members of his team. The Blue Team was really struggling with Georgia tasked with completing the dish. With five minutes left, she salvage the dish and plated up pan-fried prawns with a scallop ceviche. Both the Green and Red Teams were praised for their teamwork and excellent communication. The Yellow Team, on the other hand, was praised for their prawns but criticized for their undercooked flatbreads. Despite Georgia's efforts to single-handedly make her team's dish under extreme conditions, it wasn't enough as their miscommunication, cluttered decisions and undercooked prawns left the Blue Team in elimination.	1,127,000	#1	
15/03-5	Thursday, 21 May 2015	The Fifth Judge Elimination Challenge – Amy, Fiona, Georgia, Jarrod and John had 75 minutes to cook five servings of a dish for the four judges, with each contestant joining the judges to taste their own dish. Georgia's dish was loved by Marco and the judges. John and Amy were both were criticised for the tendency errors in their dishes, but also received praise from the judges. Ultimately, the three of them were declared safe. Jarrod's execution let him down, delivering a gazpacho that lacked acidity and a croquette filling that was overcooked, while Fiona's pastry was inconsistent and undercooked. However, her pie filling was good enough to keep her in the competition and it was Jarrod who was eliminated.	1,110,000	#1	
15/03-5	Thursday, 21 May 2015	MasterClass: Gary Mehigan, Marco Pierre White, Shannon Bennett, Curtis Stone and Matt Preston – In their first MasterClass, the nineteen remaining contestants were presented by Marco and the chefs with their recipes. Gary used Marco's Mystery Box ingredients to create his twice Baked Souffle. Marco cooked his Mac n' Cheese. Marco's former apprentices showed their dishes to the contestants – Billie's Red Team, after their performance in the relay challenge, were presented with Shannon's Apple Tart and Curtis cooked his Butternut Pumpkin Soup to them and the contestants. Lastly, Matt presented his two sweet recipes (his White Chocolate Mousse and Mango Daiquiri).	912,000	#6	
Week 4
16/04-1	Sunday, 24 May 2015	Maggie Beer's Mystery Box and Invention Test – Maggie Beer brought a twist to the mystery box challenge, with the ingredients having to be foraged solely from the MasterChef garden. Georgia, Kristina, Matthew, Jessica, Sara and Melita were the Top 6 and impressed with their use of the garden's fresh produce, with Melita winning the advantage in the invention test. She chose stone-fruit (over apples and berries) and the contestants had 60 minutes to invent a savoury dish with fruit as the inspiration. This challenge confused a number of contestants, with the worst dishes belonging to Fiona, Jacqui, Jamie and Rose. Billie, Jessie and John impressed Maggie with their ability to use the fruit in new and interesting ways and won the chance to cook for immunity. Fiona and Jacqui were sent to the pressure test for serving raw proteins, while the judges chose to send Rose to the pressure test as well.	1,082,000	#4	
17/04-2	Monday, 25 May 2015	Pressure Test: Anna Polyviou's Carrot Cake – Guest chef Anna Polyviou brought her version of a carrot cake, judged "Australian Dessert of the Year", for Fiona, Jacqui and Rose to replicate. With three hours to bring 12 different elements together, the time pressure was great, leading each contestant to fail to temper her chocolate and each of their plates had notable errors: Jacqui's caramel glaze was too dark and sticky, Fiona's cake had issues on the assembling and texture, while her sorbet lacked flavour and her cream cheese foam was lumpy. Rose missed the foam at the last minute, but the judges were impressed with her dish overall and she was first to be declared safe. Ultimately, Fiona's dessert, which lacked definition, sealed her elimination.	1,112,000	#3	
18/04-3	Tuesday, 26 May 2015	Immunity Challenge: Duncan Welgemoed – Billie, Jessie and John faced the first round of the challenge with each contestant having to name one of 26 mystery ingredients, one for each letter of the alphabet. Billie and Jessie each dropped out on their second guess, thus moving John into the second round by default. He thus had the chance to cook for immunity against South Australian chef Duncan Welgemoed. He picked the fresh pantry (over the processed food pantry) and with 75 minutes, cooked a pork adobo with coconut rice. Duncan's dish of Tuna, Pork Fat Vinaigrette and Stonefruit was praised for its simplicity, cleanness and presentation, and while John was praised for the subtlety in his dish, compared to past dishes, his rice was chalky and pork was unevenly cooked, and he lost to Duncan, 24 points to 22.	1,145,000	#1	
19/04-4	Wednesday, 27 May 2015	Abbotsford Convent Bakery Team Challenge – The teams took over the running of the Abbotsford Convent Bakery, designing a menu with the objective of making the highest profit in three hours of service. With four hours to prepare at least one savoury dish and one dessert, plus loaves of sourdough bread, the scale of the challenge created problems. Both teams struggled to make the pastry for their pies, get their bread baked, and have a couple of dessert options ready to sell. By the time service started, the Red Team managed to have all but their pies ready for sale, while the Blue Team only had brownies, meaning that early on, the Red Team had six times the profits. The Blue Team's slow start combined with lower pricing meant they were not able to catch up ($2565.75 vs. Red's $3205.80) and they landed in the elimination challenge.	937,000	#8	
20/04-5	Thursday, 28 May 2015	Sudden Death Elimination Challenge: Thai Cuisine – The nine losing contestants faced a three-round Thai-themed elimination challenge set by chef Benjamin Cooper. Anna, Billie and Jamie cooked the top three dishes in the ten-minute round. Ashleigh, Ava and Stephen most impressed in the 20 minute round, leaving Jacqui, Melita and Rose to cook in the thirtyminute round. Rose impressed with her final dish and while Jacqui's elements were disjointed, it was the lack of protein in Melita's chicken curry that was enough to send her home.	1,052,000	#1	
Week 5 – Superstars Week
21/05-1	Sunday, 31 May 2015	Poh's Mystery Box and Invention Test – Poh Ling Yeow, the runner-up of series 1 returned to set the mystery box challenge, filled with her favourite ingredients. John, Georgia, Jessie, Reynold and Rose were the Top five, and John won the advantage in the invention test, with Hayden Quinn, from series 3, bringing the three core ingredients. He chose pork and with 60 minutes, it was Anna, Ava and Georgia who championed the ingredient in inventive ways. Ashleigh, Kristina and Rose failed to deliver and were sent to the pressure test.	1,056,000	#4	
22/05-2	Monday, 1 June 2015	Pressure Test: Kylie Millar's Toffee Apple – Former season 4 contestant Kylie Millar gave Ashleigh, Kristina and Rose the challenge of recreating her 14-element toffee apple dessert in two and a half hours. Ashleigh excelled and was the only contestant to complete the dish. Rose was criticised for taking most of her sugar elements too far, making her caramel too bitter. But, while Kristina had the best edible spoon and caramel glaze, she failed to temper the required heat for her sticky caramel sauce to achieve the perfect amount of bitterness and missed out the other key components to the dish, including the apple jellies, cinnamon flakes and isomalt shards – one of which was the freshness from the apple. Those errors Kristina had made failed to achieve the significant balance to match Kylie's dish and she was eliminated.	1,084,000	#5	
23/05-3	Tuesday, 2 June 2015	Immunity Challenge: Callum Hann – In the first round, Anna, Ava and Georgia faced a basic skills relay challenge, in which they had to finely dice onions, whip egg whites to firm peaks and segment a whole chicken. Anna managed a comeback win, overtaking Georgia at the last moment to win the chance to compete for immunity against season 2 runner-up Callum Hann. She picked the 'black' food pantry (over 'white'), consisting of exclusively very dark and/or very expensive ingredients. With 75 minutes, she cooked Dry-aged Beef, Carrot and Blackberry Salad with a Mushroom Truffle Puree. Callum's dish of Black Pudding, Goats Cheese and Carrot Salad with Pickled Blackberries was praised for its delicate balance and textural elements, and while Anna's beef and carrots were well cooked, her puree was bland and she lost, 21 points to 19.	1,106,000	#2	
24/05-4	Wednesday, 3 June 2015	Mexican Street Food Team Challenge – The teams faced a service challenge, which they had to cook Mexican Street food for around 500 people, mentored by Ben Milbourne and Andy Allen from series 4, with the team making the most money winning. With three and a half hours of preparation and 90 minutes of service, having to buy their ingredients, price their dishes competitively and cope with demand, the teams were challenged. Both teams had issues during service; the popularity of the Green Team's Churros meant they ran out quickly, and the Red Team served some raw chicken. Sara's decision to raise her team's prices in the last 30 minutes was not enough to win and the Green Team won $6084.15 to $5807.70, sending the Red Team to the elimination challenge.	998,000	#5	
25/05-5	Thursday, 4 June 2015	Re-invention Elimination Challenge: French Dishes – The eight contestants faced a re-invention test set by season 1 contestant Justine Schofield, in which they had 90 minutes to put a modern spin on one of nine classic French dishes, determined by knife pull, Duck a l'Orange. In the tasting, Georgia's duck and orange consommé received criticism over the layer of fat left in the protein and the subtle lemon flavour in her broth. Jessie, John, Jessica and Stephen impressed with their dishes, while Jacqui, whose duck and range hotpot lacked sauce, and Ava, whose duck salad with figs and goat cheese lacked orange flavour, were declared the Bottom 2. Ultimately, the lack of orange flavour did not meet the brief of re-inventing the Duck a l'Orange and it was enough to eliminate Ava.	1,004,000	#4	
25/05-5	Thursday, 4 June 2015	MasterClass: Callum Hann, Gary Mehigan, George Calombaris, Poh Ling Yeow and Matt Preston – Callum and Poh presented their dishes to the contestants for their next MasterClass: Callum's Goat Cheese Mousse with Walnut Brittle, Lemon Curd & Honey Syrup and Poh's Shredded Duck Rendang with Pandan Coconut Lace Pancakes, Sticky Turmeric Rice & Cucumber Coriander Relish. The judges presented their recipes to the contestants: Gary's Fish Soup and Lobster Sliders, George's Coconut Calamari with Blackberry Sorbet and Matt's Prawns à la Plancha.	689,000	#11	
Week 6
26/06-1	Sunday, 7 June 2015	"Dollar" Box Challenge and Team Invention Test – The contestants faced a mystery box filled with items costing less than one dollar, and with 60 minutes to make an outstanding dish with budget ingredients, Georgia, Matthew and John were the Top 3. John again won the advantage in the Invention Test, which was set by Curtis Stone, and from a choice of seasonal vegetables picked pomegranate (over pumpkin and beetroot). Working in teams of three to make a sweet and savoury dish in 60 minutes, it was Jacqui, Jessica and Matthew's dishes that impressed the judges and made them the Top 3. Ashleigh, Anna and Billie failed to deliver enough pomegranate flavour and were sent to the pressure test.	864,000	#4	
27/06-2	Monday, 8 June 2015	Pressure Test: Marcus Wareing's Braised Veal – Anna, Ashleigh and Billie faced a two and a half hour pressure test set by British chef Marcus Wareing, in which they had to recreate his 13-element braised veal dish. Billie won praise for the quality of her dish, with Marcus especially impressed with her skills in the kitchen. Both Ashleigh and Anna struggled during the challenge, having undercooked veal kidneys in their dishes. But it was Anna, who overcooked her veal ribs and forgot to glaze it, who was eliminated.	1,135,000	#5	
28/06-3	Tuesday, 9 June 2015	Immunity Challenge: Nick Holloway – In the first round, Jacqui, Jessica and Matthew faced a plating challenge, in which they had four minutes to use prepared ingredients to plate a Press Club dish in a modern way. Both Matthew and Jacqui forgot to plate some elements, handing Jessica the win and the chance for immunity against chef Nick Holloway. She picked the food pantry of tiny ingredients (over big) and with 75 minutes, cooked a pan roasted and confit quail with pumpkins, carrots and Mandarin. Nick's dish of Autumn Fruit Poached Quail with Candied Grape, Radish and Fennel was universally praised for its depth and balance of flavours, and while Jessica's dish was also met with rapturous admiration, it was slightly less impressive and she lost, 28 points to 29.	1,136,000	#1	
29/06-4	Wednesday, 10 June 2015	Italian Team Challenge – The teams had to cook an Italian three-course lunch for 40 guests each at Pizzini Wines in the King Valley, with each team having to use a different local wine in each of their dishes. With three hours of preparation and having to collect their choice of protein from local farms, The Red Team fell behind early, as it took them the longest time to get their protein. The Blue Team changed their entrée last minute, and initially struggled to tie their rockmelon soup together as a dish. Both teams had problems with the accompaniment with their main course, but both made outstanding desserts. Ultimately, the decision was so tight, with the judges saying it was almost a tie. It came down to small details and because of the Blue Team's perfectly cooked chicken, it was the Red Team that was sent to the elimination challenge.	1,045,000	#3	
30/06-5	Thursday, 11 June 2015	Mystery Box Elimination Challenge – The contestants on the Red Team faced a three-round mystery box elimination challenge with a twist: they were given only 30 minutes per round and were only allowed the ingredients in their box, as well as the usual staple ingredients to make up to three dishes. In the first round, Georgia and Matthew made the two best dishes, with Billie and Jamie declared safe in the second, leaving Ashleigh, Jacqui and Stephen in the final round. Ashleigh impressed the judges with her crème brûlée, and she was safe. It came down to Stephen and Jacqui, and it was the latter whose overcooked scampi and undercooked pasta sealed her elimination.	1,118,000	#1	
Week 7 – Power Week
31/07-1	Sunday, 14 June 2015	Mystery Box Challenge and Invention Test – The contestants faced a challenge, in which they had to cook a dish using every ingredient in their mystery box, with the winner gaining the Power Apron. Despite fierce competition from Ashleigh, Matthew and Reynold, it was Jessie who brought the judges one of the best desserts they'd eaten in the MasterChef kitchen. Her reward was a 30-minute head-start in an Invention Test in which every contestant could pick his/her own core ingredient and had to showcase it in three different ways. The Power Apron was then passed to the next contestant who excelled in the following challenges. Four contestants were chosen for guaranteed immunity with the Power Apron being given for the winning dish. Winning the challenge and the Power Apron was Reynold with his dish of Chocolate Three Ways, while Billie, Jessie and Sara completed the Top 4. Amy left off one element in her duck dish, and that put her at risk of being sent to the pressure test, but the judging was turned in her favour when Matthew, Stephen and Jamie made dishes with technical errors and found themselves in elimination.	1,083,000	#4	
32/07-2	Monday, 15 June 2015	Pressure Test: The Sunday Roast – Jamie, Stephen, and Matthew were tasked with reinventing the "Sunday Roast", a classic Australian dish, with sides. In possession of the Power Apron, Reynold picked chicken over beef as the main protein that Jamie, Stephen, and Matthew had to cook with. Matthew decided to keep it simple and his macadamia-stuffed chicken roulade with pommes dauphine was declared a stand-out dish. Although Stephen's gravy was criticised for being too condensed by fat and the skin of his chicken too rubbery, one of Jamie's chicken roulades was overcooked and his roasted potatoes lacked execution. In a split-decision verdict for one of them to be safe, the final vote based on the cooking of the chicken was given to Stephen and Jamie was eliminated.	1,078,000	#4	
33/07-3	Tuesday, 16 June 2015	Three-Round Duel Immunity Challenge – Billie, Jessie, Reynold and Sara cooked off for guaranteed immunity and the Power Apron in a duel-based challenge, in which they faced each other in three rounds, one v one, with a different cuisine and protein each round. In the first round, Reynold, as holder of the Power Apron, chose Jessie as his opponent cooking a French dish with pipis, but it was Jessie who won the round. In the second round, Billie and Sara faced off cooking flathead UK-style, with Billie winning. Jessie and Billie then competed in the final round cooking a Chinese dish with chicken, with Billie's twice-cooked orange and cinnamon glazed chicken beating Jessie's Hainanese chicken soup (27-24), giving her the immunity pin and Power Apron.	1,096,000	#3	
34/07-4	Wednesday, 17 June 2015	Restaurant Takeover Team Challenge – Teams had four hours of preparation and service for 50 guests at two Asian restaurants in Melbourne, Tokyo Tina, a Japanese cuisine restaurant, and Saigon Sally, Vietnamese restaurant. Billie, as holder of the Power Apron, was given the Red Team captaincy and the power to choose her team and restaurant of choice, which was Saigon Sally. John volunteered to captain the Blue Team at Tokyo Tina. John's decision to make six dishes pushed the Blue Team to the edge, while the judges' suggestion that the Red Team's four dishes were too few led them to add a dish in the last hour of preparation time. By the time service started, both teams were feeling the pressure, but the Blue Team particularly struggled to cope with initial demand. Both teams put up mostly quality dishes, winning praise from the judges, but it was the poorer quality of the Blue Team's main dish and desserts that left them in elimination. Ashleigh was judged the best individual performer and won the Power Apron.	875,000	#10	
35/07-5	Thursday, 18 June 2015	Blind Taste Test Elimination Challenge – Ashleigh, as the holder of the Power Apron, chose to save Stephen from elimination, leaving Georgia, John, Matthew, Rose and Sara to face the two-round elimination challenge. In a blind taste test, they had three minutes to taste and two minutes to write down the ingredients of an unknown dish, the Korean Bibimbap, with the contestants receiving only the ingredients they correctly guessed to cook with in the second round. Sara and Georgia, who had the most correct guesses, along with Rose, made outstanding dishes, while John, with the least ingredients, and Matthew, who was unfamiliar with Korean cuisine, struggled the most. Ultimately, it was the irrelevant underwhelming elements and overcomplexity of John's dish that resulted in his elimination.	1,010,000	#1	
Week 8
36/08-1	Sunday, 21 June 2015	Heston Blumenthal's Mystery Box Challenge and Invention Test – Heston Blumenthal presented a mystery box filled with Australian ingredients, such as macadamia nuts and emu, and with 60 minutes to showcase these local ingredients, Billie, Reynold and Sara were the Top 3. The latter won the advantage in the invention test, and from a choice of cocktails picked Whiskey Sour over Espresso Martini and Bloody Mary. Tasked with taking the flavours of the drink and creating an inventive dish in 60 minutes, it was Ashleigh, Matthew and Rose who impressed the judges most and made them the Top 3. Amy, Georgia and Stephen failed to recreate the flavours of the drink and were sent to the pressure test.	1,215,000	#2	
37/08-2	Monday, 22 June 2015	Pressure Test: Guillaume Brahimi's Jewel of the Sea – Amy, Georgia and Stephen had two and a half hours to recreate Guillaume Brahimi's French sea urchin dish. Ultimately Georgia and Amy both, made, despite the former's dish looking flat, and the latter missing some urchin tongues in her garnish. While Stephen had thick squid tagliatelles, it was also the derailment of his dish due to the lack of urchin sauce that sealed his elimination.	1,142,000	#5	
38/08-3	Tuesday, 23 June 2015	Immunity Challenge: Jim McDougall – In the first round, Ashleigh, Matthew and Rose had to recreate a classic sticky date pudding, using second-hand equipment and ingredients. Ashleigh's modern take on the pudding won her the chance to cook for immunity against chef Jim McDougall. She picked the Northern Australian Food pantry (over South) and with 75 minutes, cooked a passionfruit semifreddo with a chocolate mousse and coconut crumb. Jim's dish, a red emperor with smoked butter and a vanilla sauce, slightly confused the judges with the mix of sweet and savoury flavours, winning praise nonetheless, but it was Ashleigh's dish that highly impressed the judges, winning her the immunity pin 26 points to 22.	1,223,000	#1	
39/08-4	Wednesday, 24 June 2015	Team Challenge: Afternoon Tea at The Hotel Windsor – The two teams were tasked with providing a high tea for 100 guests, as well as the three judges and four guest pastry chefs: Bernard Chu, Darren Purchese, Christy Tania and Kirsten Tibballs. They had three hours of cooking time in the MasterChef kitchen, and then had to transport their dishes to the Hotel Windsor, where they had half an hour of prep time and half an hour to serve. The Blue Team, led by Reynold, strived at the beginning, completing most of their prep in the kitchen and being the first to send out their tiers. The Red Team, however, struggled under Rose's command, especially when their chocolate tart shells collapsed, providing them with not nearly enough time to complete plating up at the Hotel Windsor. This, along with the Blue Team's top three dishes, gave the Blue Team the win and sent the Red Team the elimination challenge.	1,221,000	#1	
40/08-5	Thursday, 25 June 2015	Pie Elimination Challenge and Second Chance Cook-Off – Billie used her Immunity Pin and the other members of the losing team had 90 minutes to bake a pie. Matthew's pie was a standout dish and he was immediately declared safe, and while Sara's pie had a crumbling pastry and an underwhelming filling, Jessie's pastry was raw, which resulted in her elimination, but she was given a second chance, after the fourteen previously eliminated contestants returned to compete for a second chance for a Top 10 spot. The returning contestants had an open pantry and 60 minutes, with the best performer then cooking off against Jessie for his/her place in the competition. Kha, Kristina and Stephen had the top dishes with Stephen narrowly winning the opportunity over Kristina to cook off against Jessie. Ultimately, Jessie's lobster dish beat Stephen's rhubarb dish, which lacked acidity, and Jessie remained in the competition, finalising the Top 10.	1,031,000	#3	
40/08-5	Thursday, 25 June 2015		1,056,000	#2	
Week 9
41/09-1	Sunday, 28 June 2015	"Mystery" Mystery Box Challenge and Invention Test – The contestants faced a Mystery Box filled with a range of uncommon ingredients, including achacha, sorghum, sugar ants, New Zealand yams and Armenian cheese, and with 60 minutes to cook with ingredients they had never used before, the Billie, Jessie and Rose were the Top 3. Rose won the advantage in the Invention Test and chose to cook an Asian protein dish with 45 minutes to cook, meaning the contestants had no access to any dairy or European ingredients. It was Jessica, Jessie and Sara whose inventive takes on Asian flavour won them the chance for immunity. Rose, despite having the advantage, misfired on her dish as the subtlety of her egg was overpowered by spices. She was joined by Matthew and Reynold in the Bottom 3.	879,000	#6	
42/09-2	Monday, 29 June 2015	Pressure Test: Janice Wong's Cassis Plum – Matthew, Reynold and Rose had two and a quarter hours to recreate Janice Wong's blackcurrant-based plum-shaped frozen dessert. Ultimately, Matthew was praised for his daring and exact recreation of Janice's technical and refined dish. Reynold was ultimately praised for having the best sphere of the three despite facing difficulty with his dish, but he forgot some of the raspberry rice crispies. However, Rose's time was finally up – she struggled throughout and her sphere was deformed and too dense causing it to crack, while her yuzu caviar was too coarse, leading to her elimination.	1,077,000	#5	
43/09-3	Tuesday, 30 June 2015	Immunity Challenge: Ross Lusted – In the first round, Jessica, Jessie and Sara had to make the perfect batter, using only the provided staple and select pantry ingredients. Jessie delivered on the brief best and won the chance to cook for immunity against chef Ross Lusted. She picked the savoury pantry (over sweet) and with 75 minutes, cooked Beef with Beetroot. Ross' dish of Squid with Sweetcorn, Ginger and Spinach initially confounded the judges, but won them over with its complexity and technique, beating the elegant simplicity of Jessie's dish, 28 points to 25.	993,000	#6	
44/09-4	Wednesday, 1 July 2015	All American Barbecue Team Challenge – The contestants were split into teams of three for a challenge under the mentorship of American pit master grand champion Andy Groneman. They had to cook American barbecue dishes in the unique style for 150 guests. With six hours of preparation, the teams had to cook pork ribs and two other choices of meat, as well as three vegetarian sides. The Red Team of Billie, Georgia and Jessie mistakenly let their barbecue run out of fuel, putting them behind the other two teams, while the Blue Team of Jessica, Reynold and Sara had problems getting their ribs to the standard required by Groneman. When service started, only the Yellow Team of Amy, Ashleigh and Matthew were ready with all of their dishes. Ultimately, the Red Team's meat dishes were criticised for its inconsistent cooking with an off balance of spice and salt. The Yellow Team earned praise for the inventiveness of their lamb and apple slaw, but it was the Blue Team's exemplary ribs that won them the challenge, sending the other two teams to the elimination challenge.	1,173,000	#1	
45/09-5	Thursday, 2 July 2015	Rick Stein's Seafood Elimination Challenge – The six contestants on the two losing teams, except Ashleigh, who used her immunity Pin, faced a challenge set by Rick Stein, known for his traveling and expertise with seafood, which the challenge revolved around. After randomly choosing a seafood core ingredient and a cuisine, the contestants had 75 minutes to make a seafood dish. Billie, Matthew and Georgia presented the judges with dishes that didn't receive any negative feedback and were declared safe. It came down to Jessie's poached Murray River cod with peas, bacon and Brussels sprouts and Amy's Malaysian curry with squid noodles. Both dishes had raw seafood, but it was the thick and grainy texture in her curry sauce that sealed Amy's fate, eliminating her.	1,155,000	#1	
Week 10
46/10-1	Sunday, 5 July 2015	"Deja Vu" Mystery Box Challenge and Invention Test – The Top 8 mystery box challenge had the eight previous mystery boxes return to the kitchen, with each contestant cooking with the ingredients of one of them. After the 60 minute cook, Matthew (with the Power Apron week box), Reynold (with Heston's history box) and Billie (with Poh's Asian-themed box) impressed the judges, and Billie won the advantage into the invention test. She chose earth (over wind and fire) as the conceptual theme of the challenge. The judges told the contestant that 4 of them would go to the immunity challenge and the other 4 would go to the pressure test. Jessie wowed the judges with her dessert, with Georgia, Reynold and Sara completing the Top 4. Billie blew her advantage and landed in the Bottom 4 with Matthew, Jessica, and Ashleigh.	1,010,000	#5	
47/10-2	Monday, 6 July 2015	Pressure Test: Darren Purchese's Passion Flower – Darren Purchese returned to set up a pressure test for Billie, Matthew, Jessica and Ashleigh, who were given 2 hours and 45 minutes to recreate his passion flower dessert and 10 minutes at the end of the challenge to plate the dish with the grade based on presentation. None of the contestants, except Billie, managed to add the mint oil in the white chocolate petals and paint it due to time constraints. Matthew had problems plating the dish as his white chocolate collar, which held the chocolate petals in place, broke into four pieces. During the tasting, Billie and Jessica impressed with the presentation, while Ashleigh's collar was too small and her petals did not open properly. She and Matthew both missed the textures of their elements. After Billie's dessert was the dish of the day and Jessica was also declared safe, it came down to Matthew and Ashleigh and the presentation of the dish. Ashleigh, who did not have the blossom effect in the dish, was eliminated.	1,102,000	#4	
48/10-3	Tuesday, 7 July 2015	Immunity Challenge: Monty and Jaclyn Koludrovic – In the first round of the immunity challenge, Reynold, Jessie, Georgia and Sara took turns naming herbs. Georgia and Sara were eliminated on back-to-back guesses, sending Reynold and Jessie as a team (meaning they would both get an Immunity Pin should they win) against Monty and Jaclyn Koludrovic. Both teams had to cook two dishes, a main and a dessert. With 75 minutes and an open pantry, Jessie and Reynold cooked Lobster with Fennel and Orange for main and Coconut with Passionfruit and Pineapple for dessert. Monty and Jaclyn put up a seafood alad for their main and a chocolate and olive oil mousse with granita and an aperol jelly for dessert. Monty's seafood salad scored him 28 points while Jaclyn's aperol jelly scored her 26, giving them a total score at 54 points. Even though the judges loved Reynold's dessert, giving it a perfect score of 30, the lack of depth in Jessie's sauce cost the duo the challenge as her main course scored only 23 points, giving them a total score to 53.	1,076,000	#4	
49/10-4	Wednesday, 8 July 2015	Seven-course Degustation Challenge – The seven contestants were responsible for creating a seven-course meal at The Prince Hotel Restaurant in St Kilda, Victoria, with each assigned a course. Billie went first, making a marron dish that earned general praise. Georgia was second, and her soup dish lacked balance and she faced trouble with her tuile as well as the quantity of soup. Matthew was third, and his tuna dish received praises all around. Sara went fourth, and her dish was named dish of the day, with a perfectly cooked quail, and a corn puree and blackberry vinaigrette that were applauded. Jessie had the fifth course with a lamb dish, but did not achieve the standard she aspired to as her meat was undercooked and her lentils were overcooked. Jessica had the sixth course, a savoury dessert with the feature ingredient being plums and which received praise on the combination of sweet and savoury. Reynold presented the last course with a chocolate dessert, but the judges were left disappointed with the lack of creativity and technical errors in his dish. As a result, he joined Jessie and Georgia in the bottom 3.	936,000	#8	
50/10-5	Thursday, 9 July 2015	Elimination Challenge: Time Auction – Georgia, Reynold and Jessie faced off in the return of the auction challenge from season 6. They had 100 minutes of cooking time to bid for ingredients. Jessie was left with 60 minutes to cook with chicken, root vegetables and spices, Reynold had 75 minutes to cook with eggs, citrus fruits and condiments, and Georgia got 75 minutes to cook with and sardines, nightshades and herbs. All three struggled during the cook, but in the tasting, all of their dishes were liked by the judges. However, the judges felt Georgia's butter dressing was unnecessary and Jessie's sauce was bitter, while the latter's dish lacked originality. Ultimately, the bitterness was a key flaw in Jessie's dish and she was eliminated.	1,172,000	#1	
Week 11 – "Marco Returns" Week
51/11-1	Sunday, 12 July 2015	Restaurant Service Team Challenge – The Top 6 faced a restaurant service team challenge set by Marco Pierre White, with three hours to prepare three courses for 120 people. The Blue Team, consisting of Sara, Jessica and Georgia, had a prawn entrée, a lamb main and a peach dessert, while the Red Team, consisting of Matthew, Billie and Reynold, had a duck entrée, a snapper main and a brûlée dessert. The Blue Team served overcooked prawns in their entrée, they served cold lamb and they ran out of smashed potatoes for some orders, but their dessert was universally praised by the judges, handing them the challenge win. The Red Team served some entrées with raw tortellini, they failed to scale their snapper properly, despite cooking it perfectly in their main, and had to leave out the doughnut from their dessert due to time constraints. As a result, they were sent to the pressure test.	993,000	#5	
52/11-2	Monday, 13 July 2015	Pressure Test: Double Lamb Chop on a Crepinette with Chicken Mousse and Leeks – Billie, Matthew and Reynold were given the task of replicating Marco's lamb dish with instructions coming from him and there was no set time limit; the contestants had to finish within 10 seconds of Marco. Billie initially fell behind, but was able to catch up, producing an almost identical copy of Marco's dish that received praise from all judges. Matthew struggled throughout, plating a single cut instead of a double cut. Reynold used a cut from the wrong side of the saddle, and had a large piece of bone as a result. Due to these minor errors in Matthew and Reynold's dishes, they ended up being the bottom 2. However, neither was eliminated – they would not cook for the rest of the week and instead they went straight into the elimination challenge at the end of the week.	1,065,000	#7	
53/11-3	Tuesday, 14 July 2015	Immunity Challenge: Shannon Bennett – Georgia, Jessica and Sara competed in the final immunity challenge of the season. The one competing for immunity was also guaranteed an advantage in the following day's team challenge. The first round involved baking desserts to serve as a complement to tea. Georgia's coconut biscuits earned her second chance to compete in round two over Sara and Jessica, whose dishes had technical issues. In the second round she cooked against in-house mentor Shannon Bennett – she was provided with a pantry of twenty ingredients, from which she had to choose ten, and Shannon had to cook with the remaining ten. Georgia decided to cook a Marron dish with crispy chicken skin, which the judges liked, and she received 25 points. However, despite having a difficult pantry, Shannon managed to produce a delicious fish dish with John Dory fish, figs, chicory and curry leaves, and beat her with a score of 26 points.	1,084,000	#4	
54/11-4	Wednesday, 15 July 2015	French Restaurant Service Team Challenge – Billie, Georgia, Jessica and Sara faced off in a team challenge, that involved preparing a French meal for 70 guests – 2 mains and a dessert. Georgia, due to her advantage from the previous day's immunity challenge, had the power to choose her teammate. She chose Billie to be part of her Blue Team, which left Jessica and Sara as the Red Team. The teams were responsible for ordering the ingredients as well as preparing and serving the meals. The Blue Team chose to go with a beef dish made by Billie, and a prawn dish by Georgia, both of which were praised. Jessica prepared a salmon dish which was cooked perfectly, but Sara's lamb dish with chocolate and blackberry sauce did not work well. Both teams' desserts had issues – the Blue Team did not make enough, and the Red Team's plating was questioned. However, the latter's burnt butter cake was praised. Despite all the troubles however, the Blue Team won, sending Billie and Georgia to Finals Week. The Red Team would join Reynold and Matthew in the elimination challenge.	1,237,000	#1	
55/11-5	Thursday, 16 July 2015	Childhood Food Memory Elimination Challenge – Jessica, Matthew, Reynold and Sara faced off in the final elimination challenge before the Finals. They had 90 minutes to make a dish using their childhood as inspiration. Reynold made a chocolate ganache with honeycomb, tempered chocolate and orange jelly. Although he initially had problems with his honeycomb, he got it to work and his dessert was named dish of the day. The simplicity of Sara's pasta dish lacked complexity in her broccoli sauce. While Jessica's prawn dish earned praise with the flavour depth in her broth, the prawns, which were served in their shells, made it difficult for the judges to eat. But it was down to the imbalance and construction of Matthew's lasagna as he was eliminated.	1,186,000	#1	
55/11-5	Thursday, 16 July 2015	MasterClass: Marco Pierre White, George Calombaris and Matt Preston – Joined with the judges, Marco presented his second MasterClass to the Top 5. First, Marco made a simple pasta with tomato sauce. Billie and Georgia were given the opportunity to have a masterclass alone with George due to their exceptional performance in the team challenge earlier in the week. He showed them the "monochrome of red". Later, Matt showed them two simple but homely chicken dishes.	989,000	#4	
Week 12 – Finals Week
56/12-1	Sunday, 19 July 2015	Finals Mystery Box Challenge & Food Trends Invention Test – The Top 5 finalists competed in their last mystery box challenge. The contestants were allowed to choose one ingredient each from the pantry in 30 seconds, followed by one ingredient chosen by each of the judges before cooking in 60 minutes. The contestants all received praise for their dishes, particularly Sara for her beetroot squid dish and Billie for her beetroot and dill stack, but Sara's unique dish won her the challenge. She was given an advantage in the invention test where she had to choose one of three food trends: "Cheeks and Jowls", "Peel to Stem" and "Savoury Sweets", for all five contestants make unique dishes with in 60 minutes. Sara chose the peel to stem, but blew her advantage when she struggled for the options of her dish, with the decision of leaving off the watermelon skin during the cook before serving it to the judges, who agreed that her dish did not meet the brief of the challenge. Jessica's dish split the judges' opinions on the use of her ingredients. Reynold struggled early on, using a protein instead of a vegetable. Realizing his mistake, he used celery for his dish, which impressed the judges, but it lacked creativity as they preferred Billie's and Georgia's dishes and named them the Top 2, sending Reynold to join Sara and Jessica in the pressure test.	1,044,000	#4	
57/12-2	Monday, 20 July 2015	Pressure Test: Grant King's Liquid Gnocchi with Mushroom Consommé – Jessica, Reynold and Sara faced off in a pressure test, in which they had to replicate one of two hat chef Grant King's dishes. They had 2 hours to recreate a technically challenging and detailed liquid gnocchi with mushroom consommé. All three contestants struggled and, after the end of the cook, both Reynold and Sara forgot their brioches in the oven. When Reynold became the first of the three to successfully create his liquid gnocchi spheres, his consommé was opaque. Jessica did the best of the three, and managed to get all the elements on the plate and whose dish was close to Grant's as her clear consommé and delicate gnocchi spheres was praised in the tasting. However, Sara presented her dish with deformed gnocchi that was bland and under-seasoned, which resulted in her elimination.	1,070,000	#7	
58/12-3	Tuesday, 21 July 2015	"No Rules" Challenge – Billie, Georgia, Jessica and Reynold faced off in a rule-free cooking challenge in their chosen time frame, 90 minutes. The winner was awarded an advantage in their next cook off. All of them chose to make desserts: Reynold made an apple and caramel dessert with ice cream and a nested tuile, Billie and Georgia made desserts inspired by their respective childhoods – Billie's lemon verbena mousse with saffron cornflakes and Georgia's deconstructed lemon meringue, while Jessica made a blue cheese mousse with roasted figs, a burnt butter crumb, ice cream and caramel sauce. Although her plating was an issue, the flavour of her caramel sauce and silkiness of her ice cream highly impressed the judges and she won the challenge, securing the advantage.	1,231,000	#2	
59/12-4	Wednesday, 22 July 2015	The Press Club Service Challenge – George let Billie, Georgia, Jessica and Reynold cook at his restaurant, The Press Club. They had to cook four of his signature dishes for 35 VIP chefs and restaurateurs in four hours and thirty minutes. As he advantage from last night, Jessica was able to choose one of the restaurant's dishes and chose the Devil's Footsteps lamb dish. The others got to randomly pick a dish from the knife block: Georgia picked the Monochrome Greek salad, Billie chose Greek Creme Brûlée with commandaria, and Reynold was left with the Whiting and Lamb Tzatziki. After service time, both Jessica and Reynold's dishes had critical issues, and the final decision came down to Billie and Georgia, who both delivered the dish of the day. Nonetheless, the judges gave Georgia the win and Billie joined the Reynold and Jessica to face the pressure test.	1,363,000.	#1	
60/12-5	Thursday, 23 July 2015	Pressure Test: Brett Graham's Flame Grilled Bonito with Pickled Cucumber, Celtic Mustard and Shiso Dressing – Reynold, Billie, and Jessica faced a pressure test, in which they had two hours to replicate Brett Graham's flame grilled bonito dish and five minutes to cook and plate the fish. Although Billie had been behind time in order to perfect the cooking of her fish, her dish was praised. However, she received criticism for the lack of shiso dressing in her dish. Jessica had a balanced sauce but a rather chaotic presentation as well as a slightly torn bonito skin. Reynold also had a torn bonito skin, but the fact that he turned the flesh side down briefly during the cook caused his fish to become dry, which resulted in his elimination.	1,247,000	#1	
60/12-5	Thursday, 23 July 2015	MasterClass: Chefs vs. Contestants – In the last MasterClass of the Top 24, first George and Gary faced a Mystery Box chosen by the Top 3 contestants. Then Gary, George and Shannon Bennett competed against Billie, Georgia and Jessica in a relay challenge. Gary, George and Shannon made a savoury dish, while Billie, Georgia and Jessica made a dessert. Both dishes were praised by the judges (Matt and two former contestants, Ava and Stephen) but both had issues. The professionals won the challenge.	1,052,000	#4	
Grand Finale Week
61/13-1	Sunday, 26 July 2015	Semi-Finals: Service Challenge – The top 3 semifinalists faced a four-hour service challenge, in which they had to cook a main dish and a dessert to be served to 20 diners and to the judges in the. Billie's dishes, Roasted Lamb with Mint Peas and Dill and Rhubarb Spider, received overall praise from the judges, sending her to the finale. Jessica made a roasted pork belly with a smoked yoghurt shiso and poached quince, and a white chocolate dome filled with a popcorn sponge and grapefruit gel. Her savoury dish also received overall praise by the judges, but her dessert had some issues: her sponge was heavy and her gel had an artificial taste. Georgia fell behind throughout the challenge to prep her dishes, a cured ocean trout with cucumbers and apples and a mango sorbet with a vanilla yoghurt parfait, but despite the panicked plating, both of her dishes earned praise in the taste and Georgia advanced to the finale. Although the judges applauded Jessica's main dish, they just weren't convinced about the flavour profile and creativity in her dessert and she was eliminated.	1,389,000	#3	
62/13-2	Monday, 27 July 2015	Grand Finale – The finale consisted of three rounds, in which the grand finalists had to cook a three-course meal for the judges. The first round was a mystery box that contained produce presented by ten of Australia's best farmers. Billie and Georgia had 60 minutes to use any of these ingredients from the box to cook their dishes. Billie picked goat cheese, strawberries, Daintree vanilla, Ligurian honey, pear cider and pineapple sage, while Georgia picked vanilla, goat cheese and strawberries. Billie's baked strawberries with grapeseed oil cake lacked flavour in her strawberry parfait. Georgia earned high praise in her goat cheese and vanilla ravioli with strawberry broth despite her pasta being too thick, scoring 23 points out of 30 while Billie scored 21. In the second round, the finalists had 90 minutes to cook a dish for their respective family and friends. Billie's scallops dish with fennel, ginger, orange and earned praise, but the presentation of her dish let her down, scoring 25 points to the total of 46. Georgia took the lead again with her mushroom three ways dish, which received overall praise on the execution and presentation, earning 27 points to 50 total. Ih the last round, Billie and Georgia had five hours to recreate a monumental interpretation of a dessert known as Botrytis cinerea (a grape rot which produces some of the sweetest dessert wines in the world) made by Heston Blumenthal. In five hours, Billie managed to redeem herself in keeping her control of recreating the dish as Georgia fell behind throughout the challenge and, which led to her decision to disregard the sugar ball and focus on her other elements during the last five minutes. In the tasting, Billie earned overall positive feedback from the judges with her take of the dish, while Georgia had missed the sugar ball and her grape gel was grainy. She scored 30 points, (7 points each from Matt and Heston and 8 points from Gary and George), tallying her overall score at 80. Billie then scored 36 points (9 each from all of the judges), finalizing the score of 82 points.	1,840,000	#2	
62/13-2	Monday, 27 July 2015	Winner Announced – Billie won the grand prize of $250,000, an Alfa Romeo Giuletta, and a monthly column in the magazine Delicious. She was also offered a job on the spot by Blumenthal at his UK restaurant, The Fat Duck. Georgia, as runner-up, won $20,000, while Jessica, in third-place, won $10,000.	2,133,000	#1	
