= Gordon Clunie =

Australian academic

Gordon James Aitken Clunie
- Born: 29 March 1932; Fiji
- Died: 26 September 2016 (aged 84)
- Occupations: Surgeon and Professor of medicine

Gordon James Aitken Clunie FRCS (29 March 1932 - 26 September 2016) was an Australian professor of medicine and physiology.

== Biography ==
He was born on 29 March 1932 in Fiji.

He died on 26 September 2016 in Australia.

== Education ==
He completed his primary schooling in Suva, Fiji.

He completed his secondary schooling in Hamilton, New Zealand.

He studied medicine at the University of Edinburgh and graduated with a medical degree in 1956.

== Personal life ==
He married Jess Clunie and had three children.

== Career ==
He has served as a reader in surgery at the University of Queensland. He was also appointed as the Director of the Dialysis and Renal Transplant Unit at Princess Alexandra Hospital in Brisbane in 1968.

In 1973, he was appointed Professor of Surgery at the University of Queensland and in 1978, he was appointed the James Stewart Professor of Surgery at the University of Melbourne.

He served as the Faculty Dean of the University of Melbourne Faculty of Medicine, Dentistry and Health Sciences.

He also served as the Editor-in-Chief of the Australian and New Zealand Journal of Surgery.

== See also ==
- University of Melbourne Faculty of Medicine, Dentistry and Health Sciences
- Fellowship of the Royal Colleges of Surgeons
