= Alastair J. Sloan =

British applied bioscientist

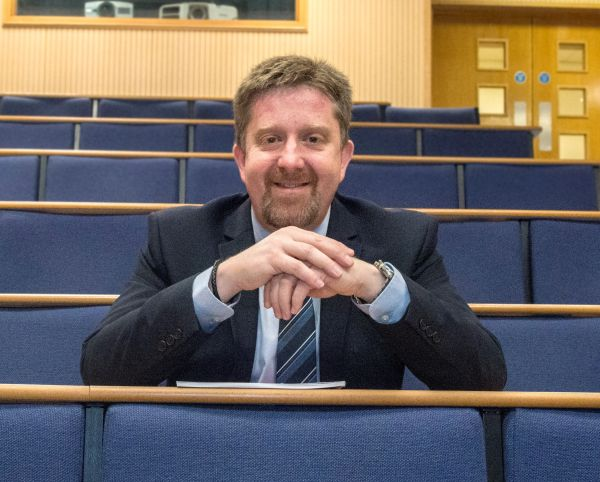

Professor Alastair J. Sloan is a British applied bioscientist and expert in the broad field of mineralised connective tissues and mineralised tissue repair. He is currently the Pro Vice-Chancellor (Research Collaboration) at the University of Melbourne, a position he has held since September 2024.

== Biography ==
Following primary and secondary education in Poulton-Le-Fylde, Lancashire in the UK, Alastair obtained his BSc in Biomedical Sciences from the University of Wales and his PhD in Oral Biology and Pathology from Faculty of Medicine and Dentistry at The University of Birmingham, UK. He joined The University of Melbourne in 2020 to take up the role of Head of School of the Melbourne Dental School until late 2024. Prior to that, he developed his own lab at Cardiff University, and was awarded his personal chair in 2012. He was Head of Oral and Biomedical Sciences at the School of Dentistry between 2010 and 2015, Director of International (2012-2015) and Director of Research (2015-2017). He was Director of the Cardiff Institute for Tissue Engineering and Repair at Cardiff University and appointed Head of School at Cardiff University School of Dentistry in 2017 before moving to Melbourne.

Alastair Sloan's research is multi-disciplinary and in the broad field of mineralised connective tissues. He is interested in the reparative potential and behaviour of the dentine-pulp complex and bone, specifically the potential therapeutic manipulation of the dental pulp stem cells : (DPSCs). This includes understanding the heterogeneity within dental pulp progenitor populations and potential therapeutic roles of these DPSCs in the wider context of regenerative medicine. His lab is also focused on development of 'smart' materials and drug delivery systems for use in oral and dental medicine and development of novel tissue culture systems to address 3Rs challenges.

Alastair has authored several books and book chapters in his field, as well as having his research widely published in leading medical, dental, tissue engineering and health policy journals.

He has been interviewed by and written articles for Newspaper and TV media including the BBC, the Wall Street Journal, the Irish Daily Mail, The Daily Mail and The Times of India

He is currently President of the Australian and New Zealand Division of the IADR. and Chair of the Australian Board of the Australian and New Zealand Council for the Care of Animals in Research and Teaching (ANZCCART).

== Selected publications ==
Sloan has published more than 100 articles and book chapters in a large number of journals on dentistry, bone repair and general health, including:

- Alraies A, Waddington RJ, Sloan AJ, Moseley R (2020). Evaluation of dental pulp stem cell heterogeneity and behaviour in 3D type I collagen gels.
- Teoh L, Sloan AJ, McCullough MJ, Thompson W (2020). Measuring antibiotic stewardship in primary healthcare: An umbrella review of studies in medical care and a systematic review of dentistry.
- Bennett JH, Beeley JA, Anderson P, Belfield L, Brand H, Didilescu A, Dymock D, Guven Y, Hector MP, Holbrook P, Jayashinge JAP, O'Sullivan J, Riggio M, Roger-Leroi V, Scheven B, Sloan AJ, K Vandamme, Manzanares MC. (2020) Eur J Dent Educ.
- Avery SJ, Ayre WN, Sloan AJ, Waddington RJ (2020) Interrogating the Osteogenic Potential of Implant Surfaces In Vitro: A Review of Current Assays. Tissue Eng Part B (Rev)
- Serra E, Saubade F, Ligorio C, Whitehead K, Sloan A, Williams DW, Hidalgo-Bastida A, Verran J, Malic S. (2020). Methylcellulose Hydrogel with Melissa officinalis Essential Oil as a Potential Treatment for Oral Candidiasis. Microorganisms.
- Bender L, Boostrom HM, Varricchio C, Zuanon M, Celiksoy V, Sloan A, Cowpe J, Heard CM (2020) A Novel Dual Action Monolithic Thermosetting Hydrogel Loaded With Lidocaine And Metronidazole As a Potential Treatment For Alveolar Osteitis. Eur J Pharm Biopharm.
- Lim SY, Dafydd M, Ong J, Ord-McDermott LA, Board-Davies E, Sands K, Williams D, Sloan AJ, Heard CM (2019) Mucoadhesive thin films for the simultaneous delivery of microbiocide and anti-inflammatory drugs in the treatment of periodontal disease. Int. J. Pharm.
- Alraies A, Canetta E, Waddington RJ, Moseley R, Sloan AJ (2019). Discrimination of dental pulp stem cell regenerative heterogeneity by single cell Raman spectroscopy. Tissue Eng Part C Methods.
- Munir A, Døskeland A, Avery SJ, Fuoco T, Mohamed-Ahmed S, Lygre H, Finne-Wistrand A, Sloan AJ, Waddington RJ, Mustafa K, Suliman S (2019). Efficacy of copolymer scaffolds delivering human demineralised dentin matrix for bone regeneration. J Tissue Eng.
- Jiang W, Wang D, Alraies A, Lu Q, Zhu B, Sloan A, Ni L, Song B (2019). Wnt-GSK3b/b-catenin Regulates the Differentiation of Dental Pulp Stem Cells into Bladder Smooth Muscle Cells. Stem Cells Int.
- Prokopovich P, Rivera M, Perni S, Sloan AJ. (2018). Anti-inflammatory drug-eluting implant model system to prevent wear particles induced periprosthetic osteolysis.
- Alraies A, Cole DK, S Rees J, Glasse C, Young N, Waddington RJ, Sloan AJ. (2018). Real-Time Binding Kinetic Analyses of the Interaction of the Dietary Stain Orange II with Dentin Matrix. J Dent.
- Yusop N, Battersby P, Alraies A, Sloan AJ, Moseley R, Waddington RJ (2018). Isolation and Characterisation of Mesenchymal Stem Cells from Rat Bone Marrow and the Endosteal Niche: A Comparative Study. Stem Cells Int.
- Nishio Ayre W, Melling G, Cuveillier C, Natarajan M, Roberts JL, Marsh LL, Lynch CD, Maillard JY, Denyer SP, Sloan AJ. (2018). Enterococcus faecalis Demonstrates Pathogenicity through Increased Attachment in an Ex Vivo Polymicrobial Pulpal Infection. Infect Immun.
- Melling GE, Colombo JS, Avery SJ, Ayre WN, Evans SL, Waddington RJ, Sloan AJ. (2018). Liposomal Delivery of Demineralized Dentin Matrix for Dental Tissue Regeneration.
- SJ Avery, L Sadaghiani, AJ Sloan, RJ Waddington (2017). Analysing the Bioactive Makeup of Demineralised Dentine Matrix on Bone Marrow Mesenchymal Stem Cells for enhanced bone repair. European Cells & Materials. 10;34:1-14
- Sadaghiani L, Gleeson HB, Youde S, Waddington RJ, Lynch CD, Sloan AJ. (2016) Growth Factor Liberation and DPSC Response Following Dentine Conditioning.
- Jordan RP, Marsh L, Ayre WN, Jones Q, Parkes M, Austin B, Sloan AJ, Waddington RJ (2016). An assessment of early colonisation of implant-abutment metal surfaces by single species and co-cultured bacterial periodontal pathogens.
- Castillo-Dalí G, Castillo-Oyagüe R, Terriza A, Saffar JL, Batista-Cruzado A, Lynch CD, Sloan AJ, Gutiérrez-Pérez JL, Torres-Lagares D. (2016). Pre-prosthetic use of poly(lactic-co-glycolic acid) membranes treated with oxygen plasma and TiO2 nanocomposite particles for guided bone regeneration processes.
- Board-Davies E, Moses R, Sloan A, Stephens P, Davies L. (2015) Oral Mucosal Lamina Propria-Progenitor Cells Exert Antibacterial Properties via the Secretion of Osteoprotegerin and Haptoglobin. Stem cells Translational Med, 4(11): 1283-1293
- Howard-Jones R, Colombo JS, Waddington RJ, Errington RJ, Sloan AJ (2015) A 3-D ex vivo mandible slice system for longitudinal culturing of transplanted dental pulp progenitor cells Cytometry Part A. 87(10): 921-928
- Lee CP, Colombo JS, Ayre WN, Waddington RJ, Sloan AJ (2015) Evaluating the Bioactivity of Demineralised Dentine Matrix Extract on the Cellular Behaviour of Clonal Dental Pulp Stem Cells in Orchestrating Dental Tissue Repair J. Tissue Engineering. May 14
- Bender L, Boostrom HM, Varricchio C, Zuanon M, Celiksoy V, Sloan A, Cowpe J, Heard CM (2020) A Novel Dual Action Monolithic Thermosetting Hydrogel Loaded With Lidocaine And Metronidazole As a Potential Treatment For Alveolar Osteitis. Eur J Pharm Biopharm. Jan 27
- Lim SY, Dafydd M, Ong J, Ord-McDermott LA, Board-Davies E, Sands K, Williams D, Sloan AJ, Heard CM (2019) Mucoadhesive thin films for the simultaneous delivery of microbiocide and anti-inflammatory drugs in the treatment of periodontal disease. Int. J. Pharm. Nov 20:118860.
- Prokopovich P, Rivera M, Perni S, Sloan AJ. (2018). Anti-inflammatory drug-eluting implant model system to prevent wear particles induced periprosthetic osteolysis.
- Nishio Ayre W, Melling G, Cuveillier C, Natarajan M, Roberts JL, Marsh LL, Lynch CD, Maillard JY, Denyer SP, Sloan AJ. (2018). Enterococcus faecalis Demonstrates Pathogenicity through Increased Attachment in an Ex Vivo Polymicrobial Pulpal Infection. Infect Immun.:86(5). pii: e00871-17.
- Sadaghiani L, Gleeson HB, Youde S, Waddington RJ, Lynch CD, Sloan AJ. (2016) Growth Factor Liberation and DPSC Response Following Dentine Conditioning. J. Dent. Res. 95: 1298-1307

== Awards ==
Professor Sloan has received multiple international awards including:

- Winner, BSODR, Mineralised Tissue Group Research Award
- Recipient, IADR Distinguished Scientist Award, Young Investigator Award
- Fellow, Royal Society of Biology
- Adjunct Professor, College of Medicine and Health, University College, Cork (2019-date)
- Honorary Professor, College of Biomedical and Life Sciences, Cardiff University (2020-date)
- Honorary Fellow, International College of Dentists(2020)
- Ad Eundem Fellow, Faculty of Dentistry, Royal College of Surgeons Ireland (2021)
- IADR Distinguished Scientist Award, the Isaac Schour Memorial Award (2021)
