= George Britton Halford =

George Britton Halford

George Britton Halford (26 November 1824 – 27 May 1910) was an English-born anatomist and physiologist, founder of the first medical school in Australia, University of Melbourne School of Medicine.

== Creationism ==
Halford was a creationist who rejected evolution. He criticized the idea of common descent and challenged the views of T. H. Huxley. He argued that humans and apes shared no common ancestor. In his book on snake venom he wrote that the snake had been designed by "some omnipotent power with infinite will."

== Publications ==
- On the Time and Manner of Closure of the Auriculo-Ventricular Valves (1861)
- Not Like Man, Bimanous and Biped, nor yet Quadrumanous, but Cheiropodous (1863)
- Lines of Demarcation Between Man, Gorilla, & Macaque (1864)
- Thoughts, Observations and Experiments on the Action of Snake Venom on the Blood (1894)

== See also ==
- Royal College of Physicians
