= John Iliffe (dentist) =

- Born: 19 November 1846; Coventry
- Died: 2 August 1914 (aged 67); Prahran
- Occupation: Dentist
- Spouse(s): Lavinia Cook, née Edwards

John Iliffe (19 November 1846 – 2 August 1914) was an English-born dentist, active in Australia.

Iliffe was born in Coventry to ribbon manufacturer Francis Iliffe and his wife Maria, née Simmons.

After apprenticing as a dentist, probably in London, Iliffe moved Melbourne in 1866.

He helped to form the Odontological Society of Victoria in 1884, where he became treasurer in 1884–1888, president in 1888-1896 and treasurer again from 1896 to 1914.

In 1890, he was instrumental in opening The Royal Dental Hospital of Melbourne.

In 1898, he became editor of the Australian Journal of Dentistry.

Iliffe died in Prahran, Victoria of cerebrovascular disease. He is buried in Melbourne General Cemetery.
