= Dental pulp stem cell =

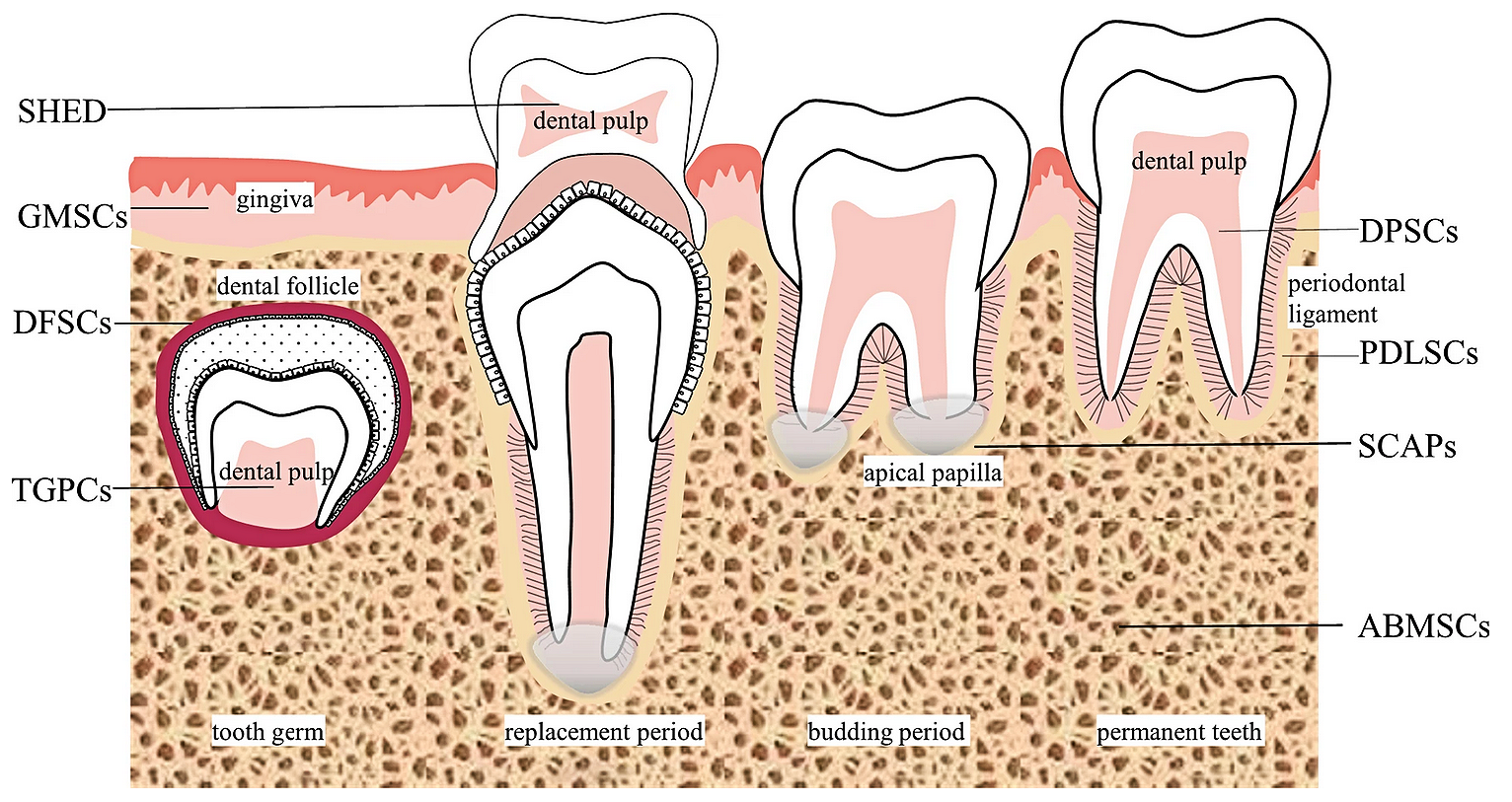
Stem cells in the oral cavity

Dental pulp stem cells (DPSCs) are stem cells present in the dental pulp, which is the soft living tissue within teeth. DPSCs can be collected from dental pulp by means of a non-invasive practice. It can be performed with an adult after simple extraction or to the young after surgical extraction of wisdom teeth. They are pluripotent, as they can form embryoid body-like structures (EBs) in vitro and teratoma-like structures that contained tissues derived from all three embryonic germ layers when injected in nude mice. DPSCs can differentiate in vitro into tissues that have similar characteristics to mesoderm, endoderm and ectoderm layers. They can differentiate into many cell types, such as odontoblasts, neural progenitors, osteoblasts, chondrocytes, and adipocytes. DPSCs were found to be able to differentiate into adipocytes and neural-like cells. DPSC differentiation into osteogenic lines is enhanced in 3D condition and hypoxia. These cells can be obtained from postnatal teeth, wisdom teeth, and deciduous teeth, providing researchers with a non-invasive method of extracting stem cells. The different cell populations, however, differ in certain aspects of their growth rate in culture, marker gene expression and cell differentiation, although the extent to which these differences can be attributed to tissue of origin, function or culture conditions remains unclear. As a result, DPSCs have been thought of as an extremely promising source of cells used in endogenous tissue engineering.

Studies have shown that the proliferation rate of DPSCs is 30% higher than in other stem cells, such as bone marrow stromal stem cells (BMSSCs). These characteristics of DPSCs are mainly due to the fact that they exhibit elevated amounts of cell cycling molecules, one being cyclin-dependent kinase 6 (CDK6), present in the dental pulp tissue. Additionally, DPSCs have displayed lower immunogenicity than MSCs.

Atari et al., established a protocol for isolating and identifying the subpopulations of dental pulp pluripotent-like stem cells (DPPSC). These cells are SSEA4+, OCT3/4+, NANOG+, SOX2+, LIN28+, CD13+, CD105+, CD34-, CD45-, CD90+, CD29+, CD73+, STRO1+, and CD146-, and they show genetic stability in vitro based on genomic analysis with a newly described CGH technique.

== Role in regenerative dentistry ==
The human mouth is vulnerable to craniofacial defects, microbial attacks, and traumatic damages. Although preclinical and clinical partial regeneration of dental tissues has shown success, the creation of an entire tooth from DPSCs is not yet possible.

=== Distraction osteogenesis ===
Distraction osteogenesis (DO) is a method of bone regeneration, commonly used in the surgical repair of large craniofacial defects. The area in which the defect is present is purposely broken in surgery, allowed to heal briefly, and then the bone segments are gradually separated until the area has healed satisfactorily. A study conducted in 2018 by Song et al. found that DPSCs transfected with Sirtuin-1 (SIRT1) in rabbits were more effective in promoting bone formation during DO. SIRT1 directly regulated MSCs into osteoblasts which then shows the accumulation of significantly higher levels of calcium after osteogenic differentiation in vitro, suggesting the potential role of DPSCs in enhancing the efficiency of DO.

=== Calcined tooth powder ===
Calcine tooth powder (CTP) is obtained by burning extracted teeth, destroying the potential infection-causing material within the tooth, resulting in tooth ash Tooth ash has been shown to promote bone repair. Although recent studies have shown that calcine tooth powder- culture media (CTP-CM) does not affect proliferation, they have shown that CTP-CM has significantly increased levels of osteo/odontogenic markers in DPSCs.

== Stem cells from human exfoliated deciduous teeth ==
Stem cells from human exfoliated deciduous teeth (SHED) are similar to DPSCs in the sense that they are both derived from the dental pulp, but SHED are derived from baby teeth, whereas DPSCs are derived from adult teeth. SHED are a population of multipotent stem cells that are easily collected, as deciduous teeth either shed naturally or are physically removed in order to facilitate the proper growth of permanent teeth. These cells can differentiate into osteocytes, adipocytes, odontoblast, and chondrocytes in vitro. Recent work has shown the enhanced proliferative capabilities of SHED when compared with that of dental pulp stem cells.

=== Potential therapeutic use of SHED ===
Studies have shown that under the influence of oxidative stress, SHED (OST-SHED) displayed increased levels of neuronal protection. The properties of these cells exhibited in this study suggest that OST-SHED could potentially prevent of oxidative stress-induced brain damage and could aid in the development of therapeutic tools for neurodegenerative disorders. After SHED injection into Goto-Kakizaki rats, type II diabetes mellitus (T2DM) was ameliorated, suggesting the potential for SHED in T2DM therapies.

Recent studies have also shown that the administration of SHED in mice ameliorated the T cell immune imbalance in allergic rhinitis (AR), suggesting the cells' potential in future AR treatments. After introducing SHED, mice experienced reduced nasal symptoms and decreased inflammatory infiltration. SHEDs were found to inhibit the proliferation of T lymphocytes, increase levels of an anti-inflammatory cytokine, IL-10, and decrease the levels of a pro-inflammatory cytokine, IL-4.

Additionally, SHED can potentially treat liver cirrhosis. In a study conducted by Yokoyama et al. (2019), SHED were differentiated into hepatic stellate cells. They found that when hepatic cells derived from SHED were transplanted into the liver of rats, liver fibrosis was terminated, allowing for the healing of the liver structure.

== History ==
- In 2000, a population of odontogenic progenitor cells with high self-renewal and proliferative capacity was identified in the dental pulp of humans permanent third molars.
- 2007 DPSC 1st animal studies begin for bone regeneration.
- 2007 DPSC 1st animal studies begin for dental end uses.
- 2008 DPSC 1st animal studies begin for heart therapies.
- 2008 IDPSC 1st animal study began for muscular dystrophy therapies.
- 2008 DPSC 1st animal studies begin for regenerating brain tissue.
- 2008 DPSC 1st advanced animal study for bone grafting announced. Reconstruction of large size cranial bone defects in rats.
- 2010 IDPSC 1st human trial for cornea replacement
