= Royal Australasian College of Dental Surgeons =

Australian postgraduate professional education body

The Royal Australasian College of Dental Surgeons (RACDS) is a postgraduate professional education body established in 1965 to provide a broad range of activities to enhance the professional development of both general and specialist dentists through individually actioned studies and examinations leading to Membership or Fellowship of the College.

== Overview ==
RACDS was established to promote high standards of postgraduate education in the dental profession, and to recognise both general and specialist dentists who have undertaken postgraduate training. RACDS provides ongoing professional development, mentoring and networking opportunities to its thousand of candidates, Fellows and Members. While it is a global organisation, its headquarters are in the Sydney CBD in Sydney, Australia.

== Fellowship ==
Successful completion of college examinations provides RACDS candidates with Membership or Fellowship with the College, and as such allows the use of prestigious post-nominals (MRACDS or FRACDS). Membership or Fellowship is awarded in the following disciplines:

1. General Dental Practice
2. Specialist Dental Practice - Dental Public Health, Endodontics, Orthodontics, Periodontics, Dento-Maxillofacial Radiology, Oral Medicine, Paediatric Dentistry and Prosthodontics
3. Oral & Maxillofacial Surgery

== Key Personnel ==
Board Members 2026–2027

- Dr Erin Mahoney – President
- Prof John Boucher AM
- Mr Tony Evans
- Dr Ankit Garg
- Dr Charmaine Hall
- Dr Sara Li
- Dr Isaac Liau – Vice President
- Dr Amanda Phoon Nguyen
- Dr Robin Whyman
- Dr Barbara Woodhouse

Senior Management Team

- Director of Education – Chris Little
- Eithne Irving, Chief Executive Officer
- Director of Corporate Services – Michael Feliciano
- Director of Marketing – Emma Gibson (Acting – Susan Hando)

== Patronage ==
- Her Excellency The Rt Honourable Dame Cindy Kiro Governor-General of New Zealand.

== See also ==
- Australian Dental Association
- List of Australian organisations with royal patronage
- Bernadette Drummond, past president and honorary fellow
