= Australian Dental Association =

Australian professional organisation

- Formation: 1928; 98 years ago
- Region served: Branches in New South Wales, Northern Territory, Queensland, South Australia, Tasmania, Victoria and Western Australia
- Website: https://ada.org.au/

The Australian Dental Association (ADA) is a national body for the dental profession in Australia.
