= Bureau of Medicine and Surgery =

Agency of the U.S. Department of the Navy that manages health care activities

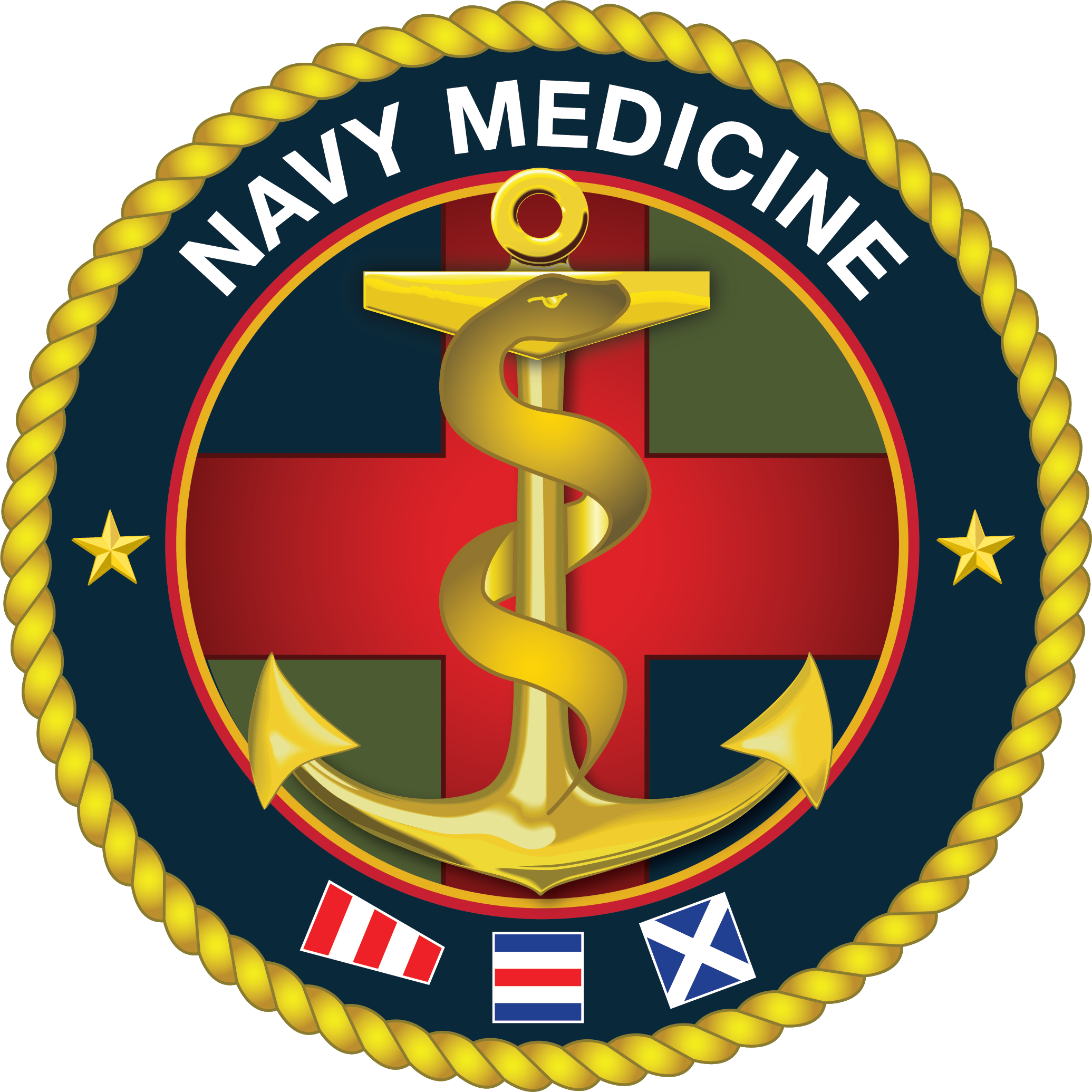
- Active: 180+ Years
- Country: United States
- Branch: United States Navy
- Type: Medical
- Size: 41930
- Part of: United States Department of the Navy
- Website: https://www.med.navy.mil

Commanders
- Acting Surgeon General of the United States Navy: RDML Rick Freedman
- Acting Deputy Surgeon General of the United States Navy: Dr. Mike McGinnis
- Command Senior Enlisted Leader: FORCM PatrickPaul C. Mangaran

The Bureau of Medicine and Surgery (BUMED) is an agency of the United States Department of the Navy that manages health care activities for the United States Navy and the United States Marine Corps. BUMED operates hospitals and other healthcare facilities as well as laboratories for biomedical research, and trains and manages the Navy's many staff corps related to medicine. Its headquarters is located at the Defense Health Headquarters in Fairfax County, Virginia. BUMED has 41,930 medical personnel and more than a million eligible beneficiaries.

== History ==
BUMED was one of the original five Navy bureaus formed in 1842 to replace the Board of Navy Commissioners. It is one of two bureaus still in existence. BUMED was headquartered at the Old Naval Observatory from 1942 until 2012.

In 2005, Navy Medicine aligned its shore facilities into four overarching commands: Navy Medicine East, Navy Medicine West, Navy Medicine National Capital Area, and Navy Medicine Support Command. In 2012, Navy Medicine Support Command was renamed and realigned into the Navy Medicine Education and Training Command, with its non-training units becoming independent under BUMED. Navy Medicine National Capital Area's largest component, the National Naval Medical Center in Bethesda, Maryland, was merged in 2011 with Walter Reed Army Medical Center to form the joint Walter Reed National Military Medical Center as a result of the 2005 Base Realignment and Closure Commission. The merged facility came under the jurisdiction of the new Joint Task Force National Capital Region/Medical, and in 2013, Navy Medicine National Capital Area was disestablished, with its few remaining facilities transferred to Navy Medicine East.

While a 2006 report of the Defense Business Board recommended that the Army, Navy, and Air Force medical commands be merged into a single joint command, citing savings in budget and personnel, this recommendation was not carried out and in 2012 the Defense Health Agency (DHA) was established separately from the military medical commands. All three military medical commands were, however, all moved to share the new Defense Health Headquarters facility in Falls Church with DHA, again as a result of the 2005 Base Realignment and Closure.

== Organization ==
=== Departments ===
The commanding officer of BUMED is the Surgeon General of the United States Navy, a Vice Admiral. BUMED is divided into ten departments, each referred to with an alphanumerical code. Each of the staff corps is headed by a rear admiral, except for the Hospital Corps, which is headed by a force master chief petty officer because of its status as an enlisted rating. The other department heads are mostly either rear admirals or civilians.

- M00: Corps Chiefs
  - M00C1: Chief, Medical Corps
  - M00C2: Chief, United States Navy Dental Corps Dental Corps
  - M00C3: Chief, Nurse Corps
  - M00C4: Director, Medical Service Corps
  - M00C5: Director, Hospital Corps
  - M00C6: Director, Civilian Corps
- Deputy Chief, Total Force (DCTF)
  - Assistant Deputy Chief, Manpower and Resources (M1)
  - Assistant Deputy Chief, Education and Training (M7)
- Deputy Chief, Business Operations (DCBO)
  - Assistant Deputy Chief, Fleet Support & Logistics (M4)
  - Assistant Deputy Chief, Information Management & Technology (M6)
- Deputy Chief, Resource Management/Comptroller (DCRM/C)
  - Deputy Director, Financial Management (M8)
  - Assistant Deputy Chief, Capabilities Requirements (M9)
- Deputy Chief, Operations, Plans & Readiness (OP&R)
  - Assistant Deputy Chief, Research and Development (M2)
  - Assistant Deputy Chief, Health Care Operations (M3)
  - Assistant Deputy Chief, Patient Safety, Clinical Quality & High Reliability/Office of the Chief Medical Officer (M5)

=== Subordinate commands ===
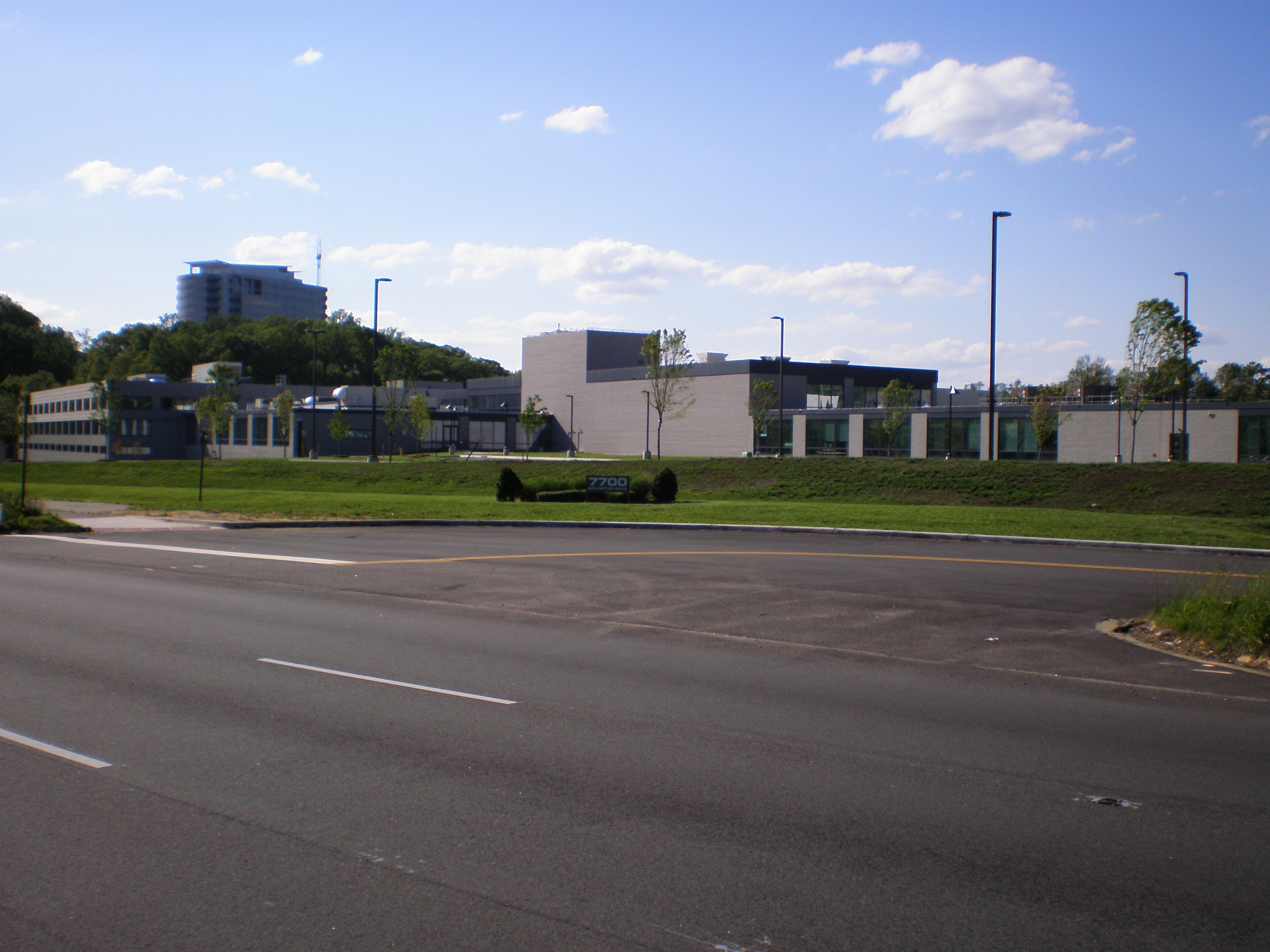
Defense Health Headquarters, Falls Church, Virginia

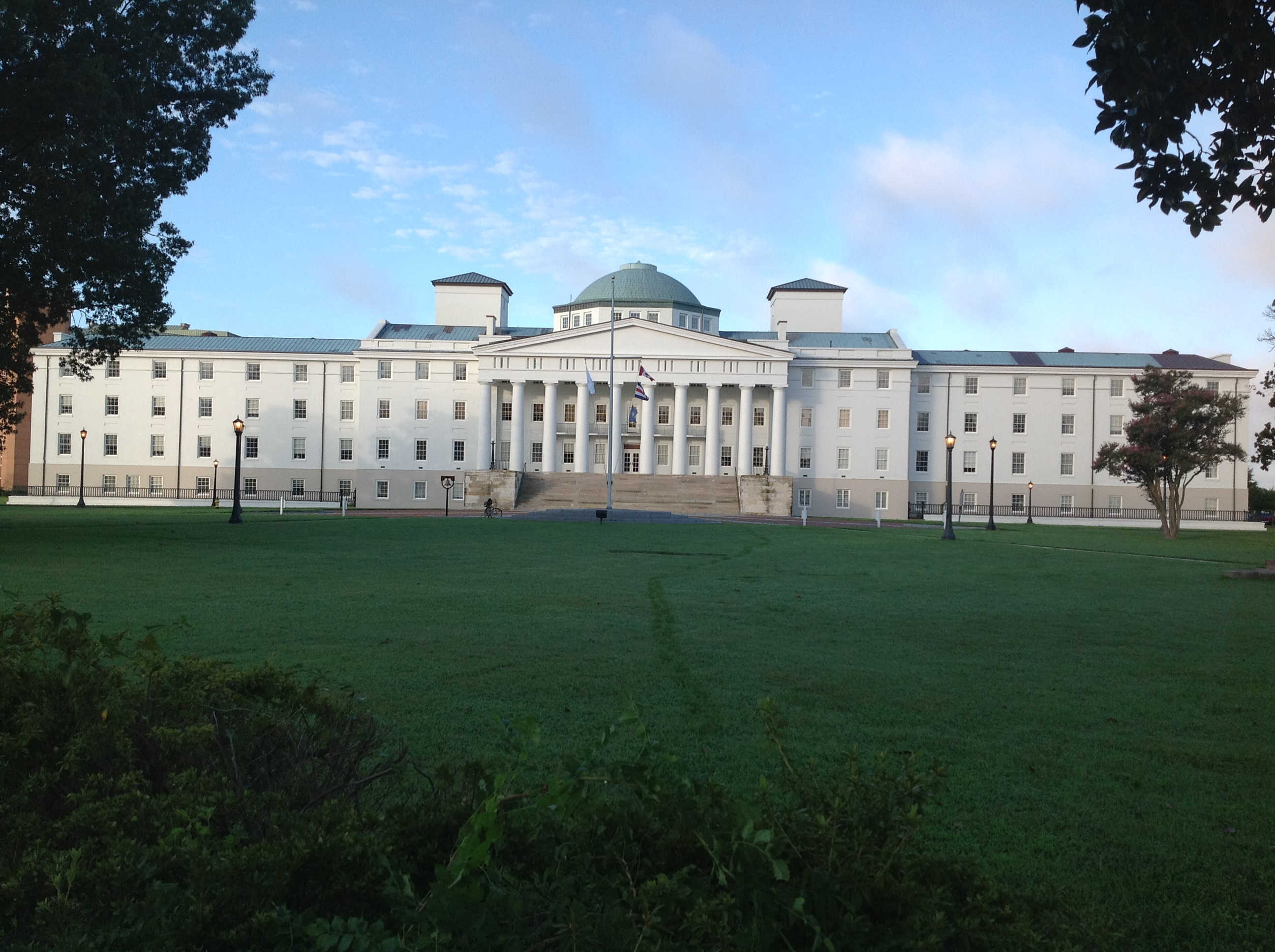
Naval Medical Center Portsmouth, Virginia

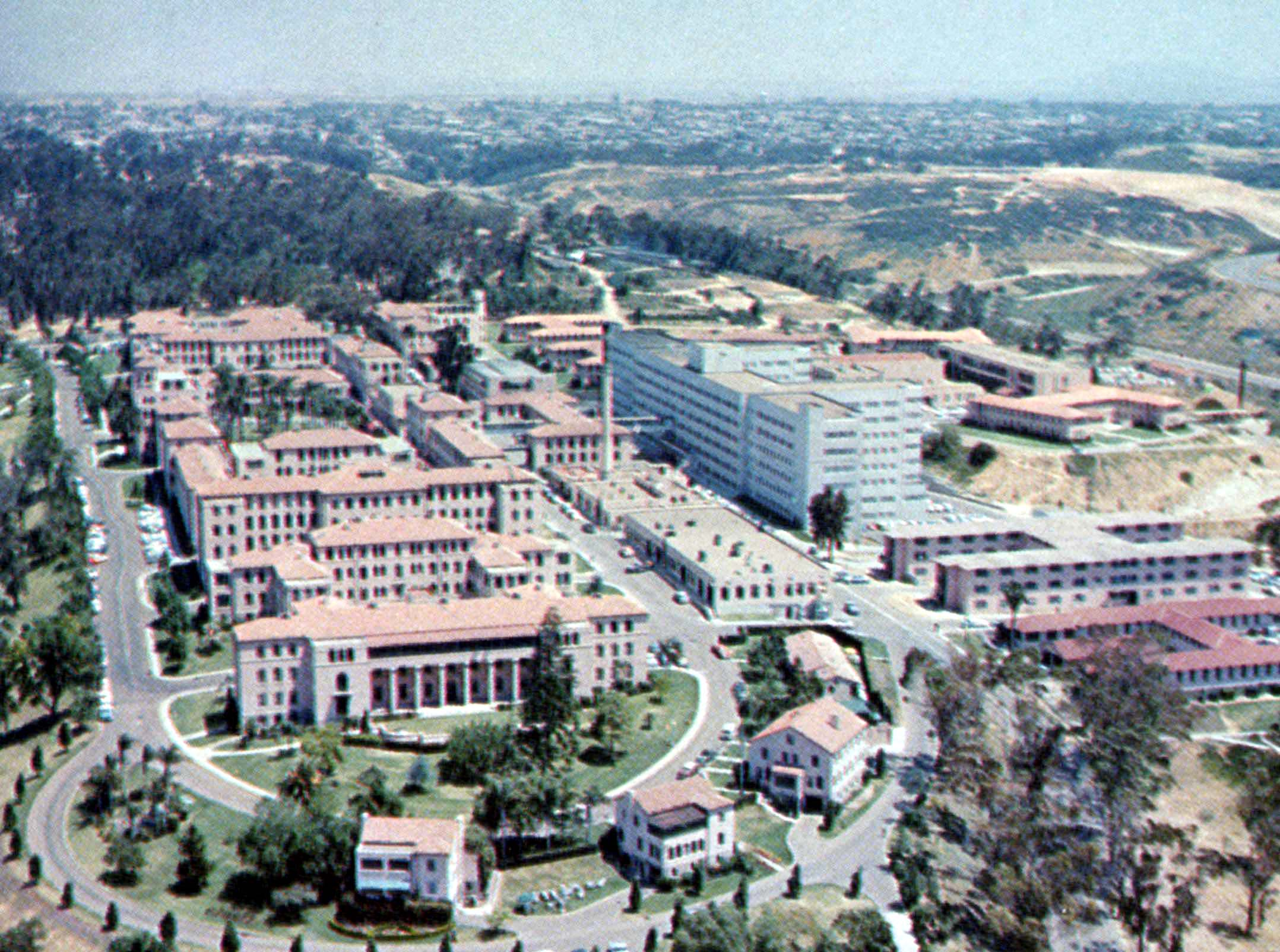
Naval Medical Center San Diego, California

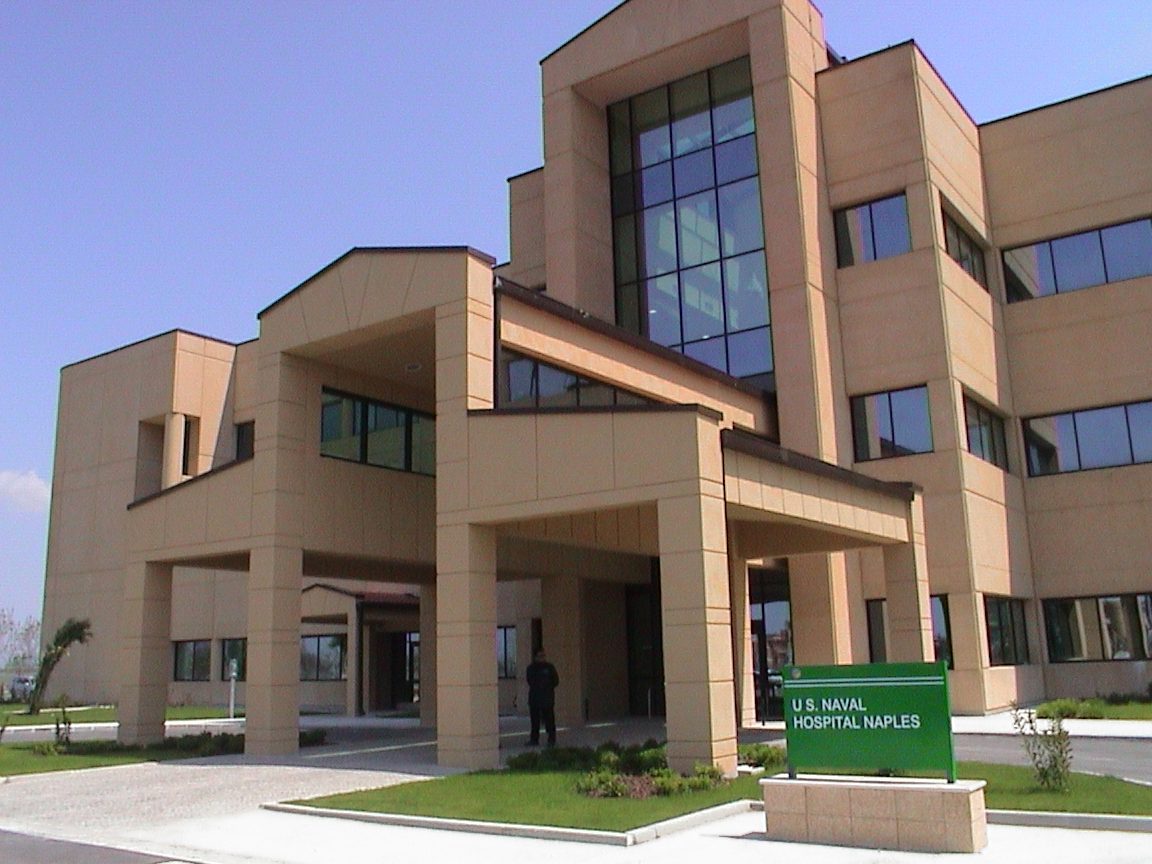
Naval Hospital Naples, Italy

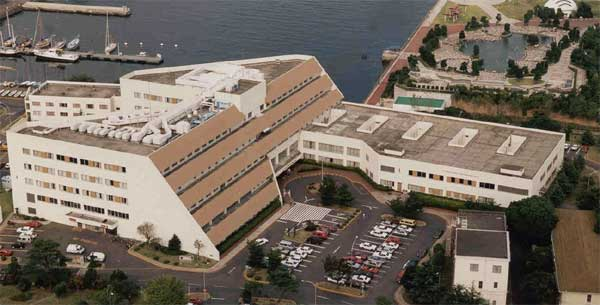
Naval Hospital Yokosuka Japan

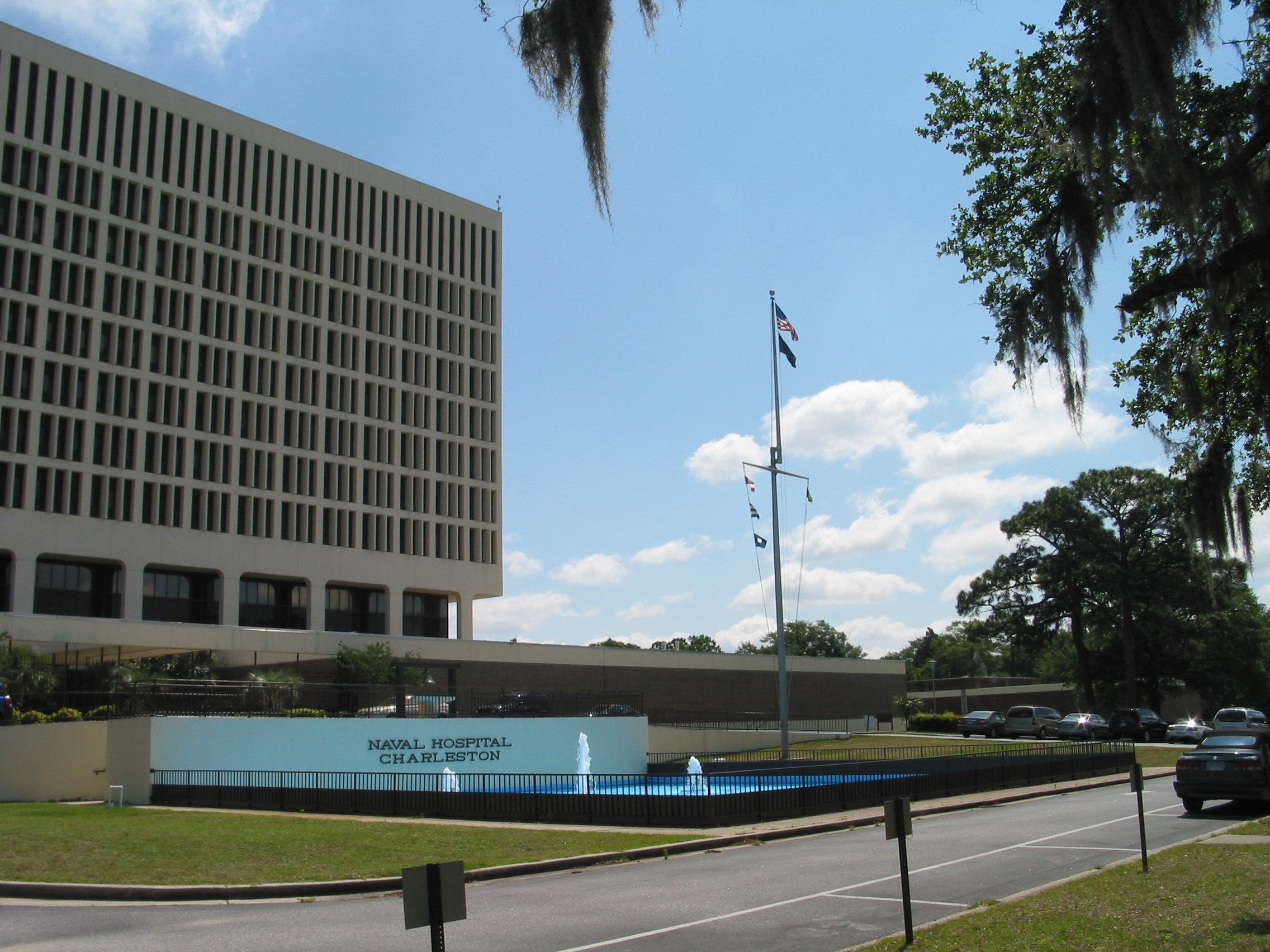
Naval Health Clinic Charleston, South Carolina

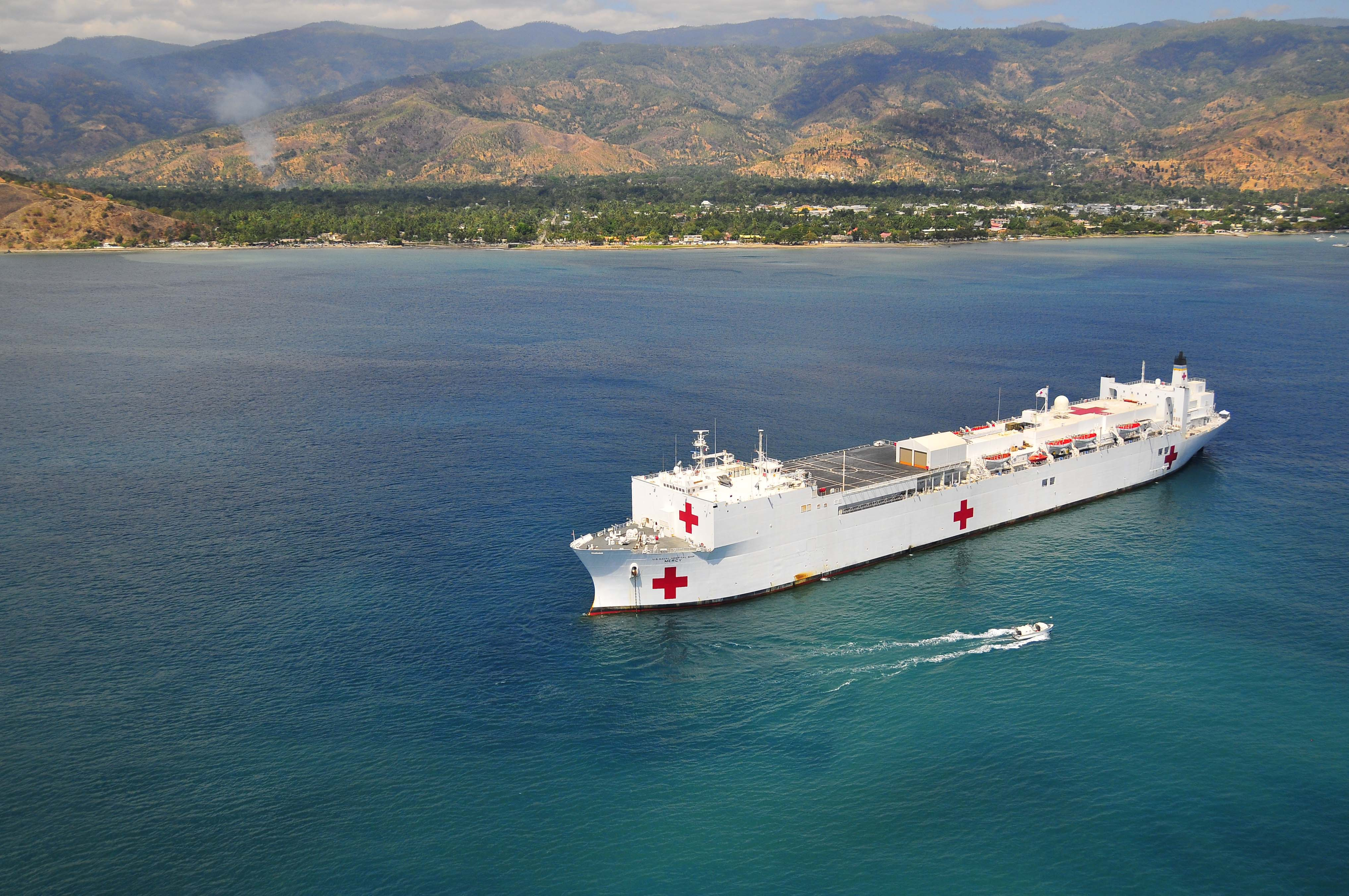
USNS Mercy (T-AH-19) off the coast of East Timor

BUMED operates the following facilities and commands:

- Bureau of Medicine and Surgery, Falls Church, Virginia

Naval Medical Forces Atlantic:

- Naval Medical Forces Atlantic, Portsmouth, Virginia
  - Naval Medical Center Portsmouth, Portsmouth, Virginia
  - Naval Hospital Beaufort, Beaufort, South Carolina
  - Naval Hospital Camp Lejeune, Camp Lejeune, North Carolina
  - Naval Hospital Guantanamo Bay, Guantanamo, Cuba
  - Naval Hospital Jacksonville, Jacksonville, Florida
  - Naval Hospital Naples, Naples, Italy
  - Naval Hospital Pensacola, Pensacola, Florida
  - Naval Hospital Rota, Rota, Cádiz, Spain
  - Naval Hospital Sigonella, Sigonella, Italy
  - Captain James A. Lovell Federal Health Care Center, Great Lakes, Illinois
  - Naval Health Clinic Annapolis, (previously Naval Hospital Annapolis) Annapolis, Maryland
  - Naval Health Clinic Charleston, North Charleston, South Carolina
  - Naval Health Clinic Cherry Point, Cherry Point, North Carolina
  - Naval Health Clinic Corpus Christi, Corpus Christi, Texas
  - Naval Health Clinic New England, Newport, Rhode Island
  - Naval Health Clinic Patuxent River, Patuxent River, Maryland
  - Naval Health Clinic Quantico, Quantico, Virginia
  - 2nd Dental Battalion, Camp Lejeune, North Carolina

Naval Medical Forces Pacific:

- Naval Medical Forces Pacific, San Diego, California
  - Naval Medical Center San Diego, San Diego, California
  - Naval Hospital Bremerton, Bremerton, Washington
  - Naval Hospital Camp Pendleton, Camp Pendleton, California
  - Naval Hospital Lemoore, Lemoore, California
  - Naval Hospital Oak Harbor, Oak Harbor, Washington
  - Naval Hospital Twentynine Palms, Twentynine Palms, California
  - Naval Hospital Guam, Agana Heights, Guam
  - Naval Hospital Okinawa, Okinawa, Japan
  - Naval Hospital Yokosuka Japan, Yokosuka, Japan
  - Naval Health Clinic Hawaii, Pearl Harbor, Hawaii
  - 1st Dental Battalion, Camp Pendleton, California
  - 3rd Dental Battalion, Okinawa, Japan

Naval Medical Forces Support Command:

- Naval Medical Forces Support Command, San Antonio, Texas
  - Walter Reed National Military Medical Center, Bethesda, Maryland
  - Navy Medicine Operational Training Command, Pensacola, Florida
  - Navy Medicine Training Support Command, San Antonio, Texas
  - Naval Medical Leader and Professional Development Command, Bethesda, Maryland

Other commands:

- Naval Medical Research Command, Silver Spring, Maryland
  - Naval Health Research Center, San Diego, California
  - Naval Submarine Medical Research Laboratory, Groton, Connecticut
  - Naval Medical Research Unit Dayton, Dayton, Ohio
  - Naval Medical Research Unit San Antonio, San Antonio, Texas
  - Naval Medical Research Unit 2, Phnom Penh, Cambodia
  - Naval Medical Research Unit 3, Cairo, Egypt
  - Naval Medical Research Center Asia, Singapore
  - Naval Medical Research Unit 6, Lima, Peru
- Navy and Marine Corps Force Health Protection Command, Portsmouth, Virginia
- Naval Medical Logistics Command, Fort Detrick, Maryland
  - Naval Ophthalmic Support and Training Activity, Yorktown, Virginia
- Navy Medicine Information Systems Support Activity, San Antonio, Texas
- Navy and Marine Corps Public Health Center, Portsmouth, Virginia
  - Navy Drug Screening Lab Jacksonville, Jacksonville, Florida

Hospital ships:

While the Medical Treatment Facility on each hospital ship is operated by BUMED's medical personnel, the ships themselves are operated by civilian mariners employed by Military Sealift Command.

- USNS Mercy (T-AH-19), San Diego, California
- USNS Comfort (T-AH-20), Norfolk, Virginia

== See also ==
- Army Medical Department (United States)
- United States Air Force Medical Service
- United States Public Health Service
