= Naval Health Clinic Cherry Point =

Navy clinic in North Carolina, United States

The Naval Health Clinic, Cherry Point
- United States Navy
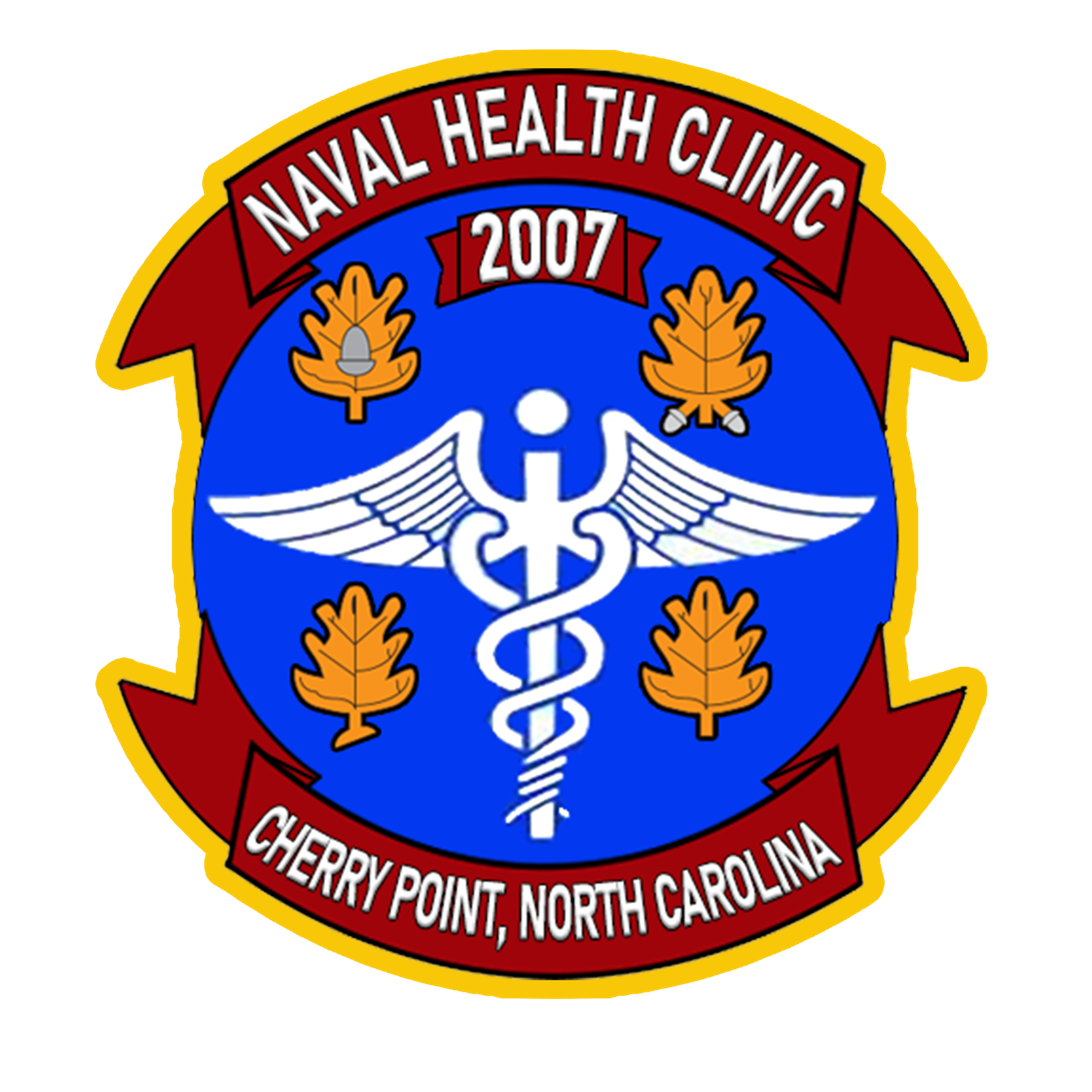

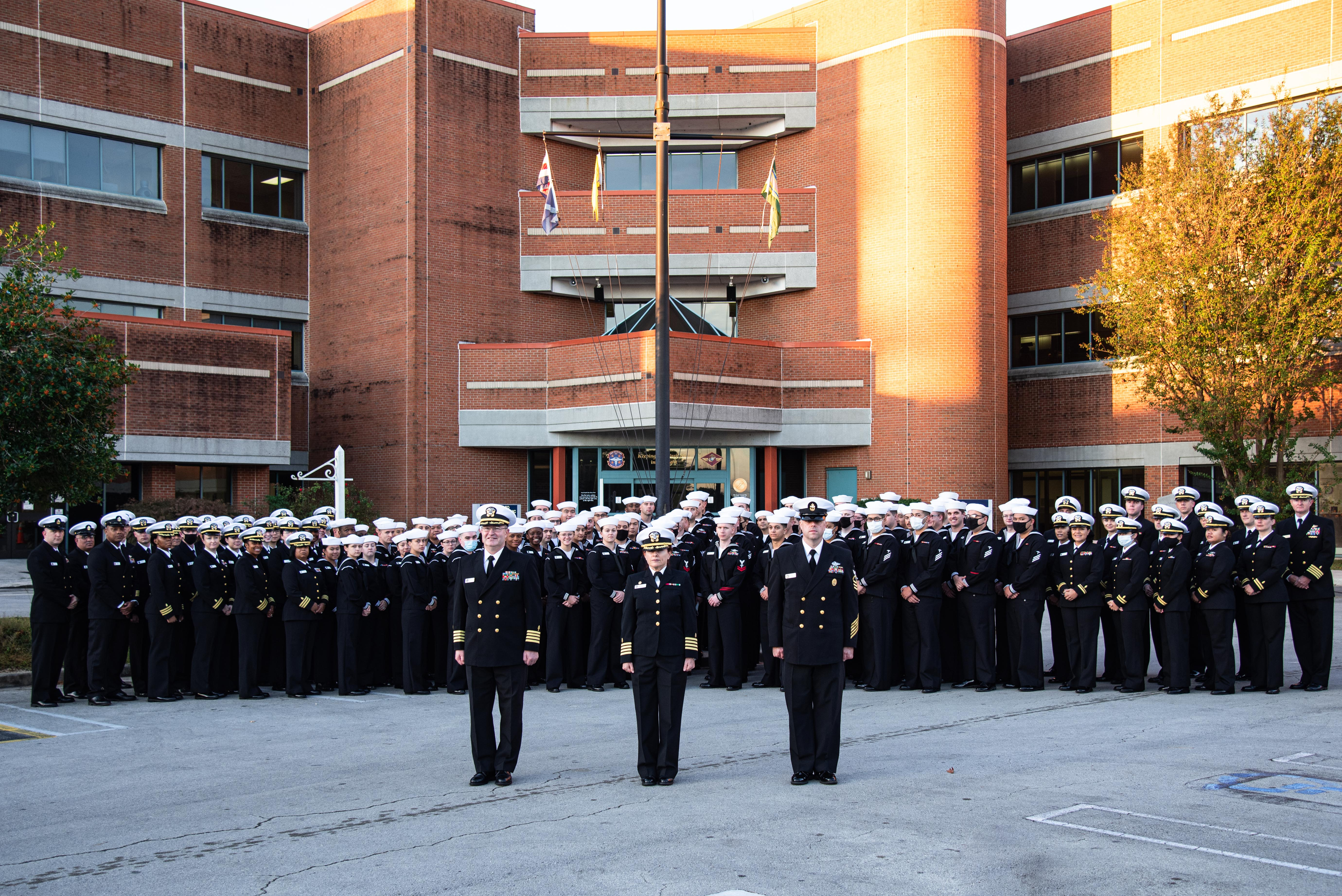
- The Officers and Sailors of Naval Health Clinic Cherry Point

Geography
- Location: Havelock, North Carolina, United States
- Coordinates: 34.895344476678716°N 76.90845258964313°W

Organization
- Care system: Tricare
- Type: Clinic

History
- Former names: Dispensary at Slocum Point (1941-1968); Naval Hospital, Cherry Point (1968-2007)
- Opened: 1941

Links
- Website: cherrypoint.tricare.mil
- Lists: Hospitals in North Carolina

The Naval Health Clinic, Cherry Point is a military treatment facility located aboard Marine Corps Air Station Cherry Point providing medical care to United States uniformed service members, beneficiaries and retirees living and serving in the Eastern North Carolina region. The clinic's motto "Keeping the Warfighter in the Fight" reflects its commitment to ensuring the base's tenet units assigned to the 2nd Marine Aircraft Wing and Fleet Readiness Center East attain and sustain the highest state of medical readiness.

== Leadership ==
Navy Captain James J. Driscoll assumed command of Naval Health Clinic Cherry Point on January 16, 2025.

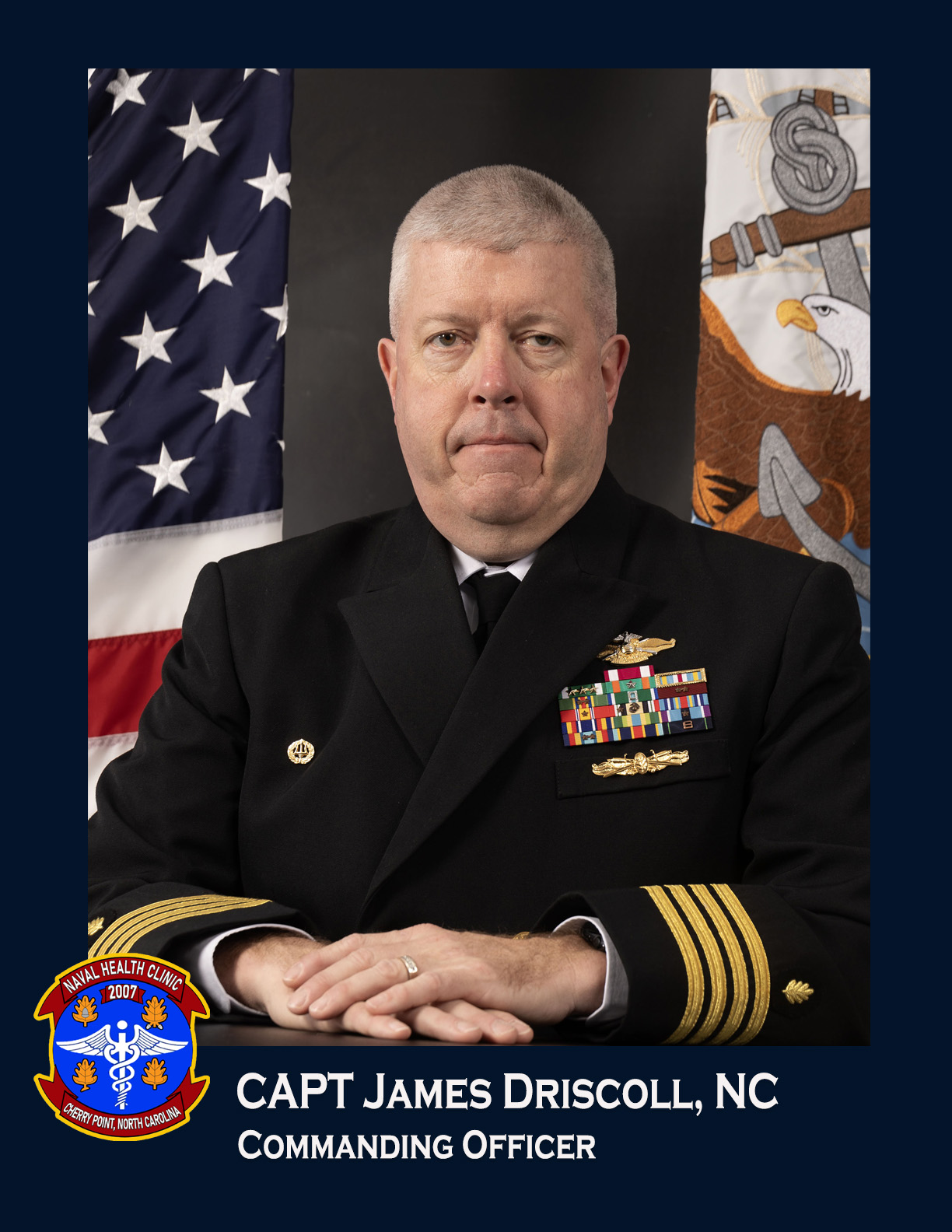
Captain James J. Driscoll assumed command of Naval Health Clinic Cherry Point in January, 2025.

== History ==
=== Early history: 1941–1968 ===
On July 9, 1941, Congress authorized the establishment of what would become Marine Corps Air Station Cherry Point, requiring the presence of medical facility and Navy Medicine personnel to provide day-to-day sick call. The first Navy Medical Officer assigned to the dispensary was Lt. Cmdr. Everette J. Olnick. Olnick's primary mission was to control the spread of Malaria since the newly established airfield was situated among eastern Carolina swampland infested with mosquitos. The scope and scale of the dispensary continued to grow as the airfield's mission took on increased importance during the nation's involvement in World War II.

=== Post World War II: 1968–2007 ===
The facility was formally commissioned as Naval Hospital Cherry Point on July 1, 1968, with oversight held by the Navy's Bureau of Medicine and Surgery. Twenty-nine years later, construction began on a state-of-the-art facility with a total of 201,806 sq. feet at a cost of approximately $34 million designed by Rogers, Lovelock, and Fitz, Inc. The new facility, at its current location on Beaufort Road, was dedicated October 1, 1994 in the memory of Posthumous Medal of Honor recipient Pharmacist's Mate Second Class William D. Halyburton and became fully functional October 3, 1994.

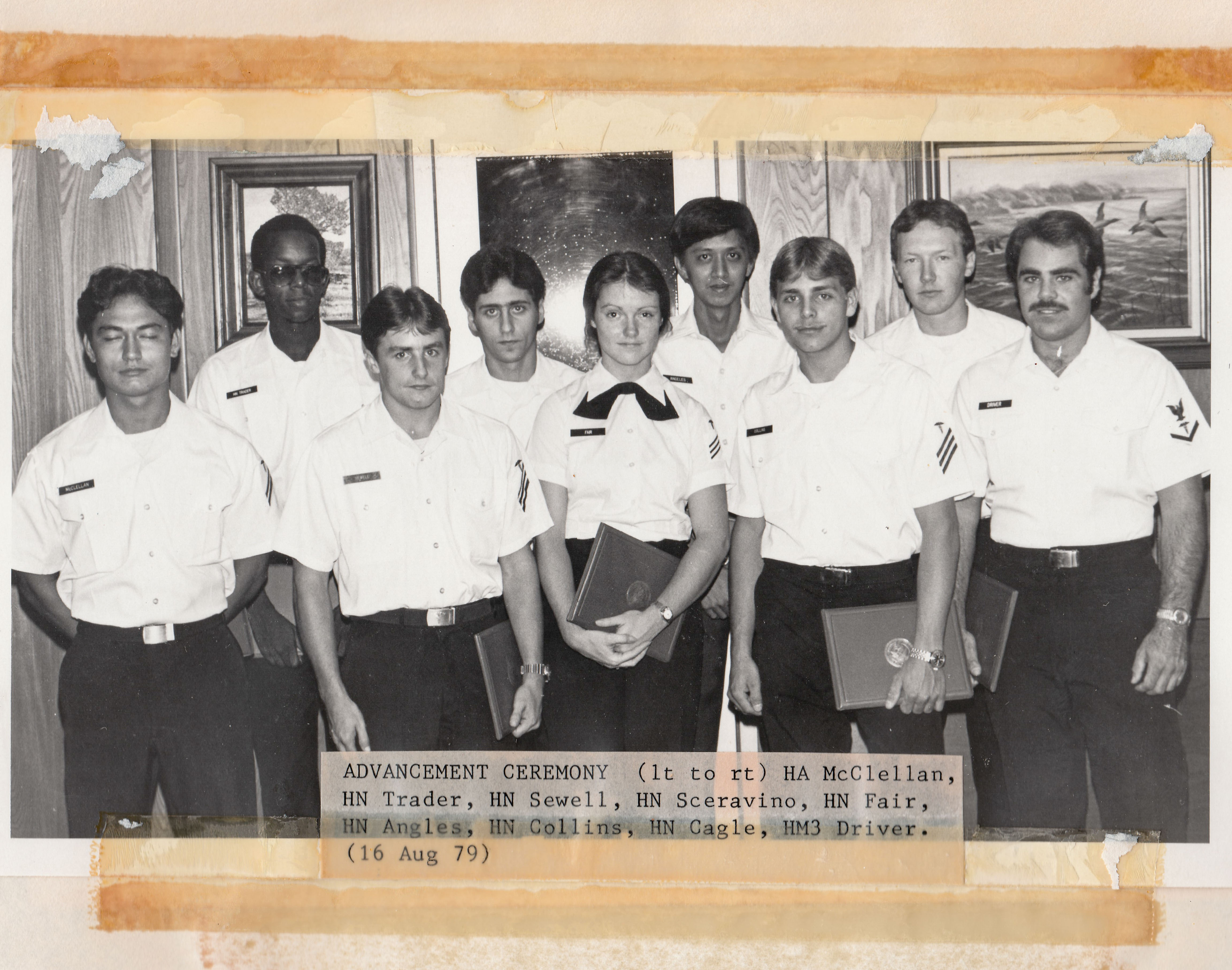
Sailors serving aboard Naval Hospital Cherry Point photographed August 16, 1979.

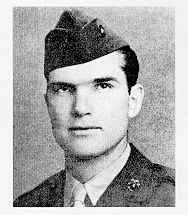
Pharmacist's Mate 2nd Class William D. Halyburton

Naval Health Clinic Cherry Point honors the memory of Pharmacist's Mate 2nd Class William David Halyburton, Jr., a Medal of Honor Recipient who posthumously received the Medal of Honor for his actions May 10, 1945 on the Island of Okinawa while assigned to the 2nd Battalion, 5th Marine Regiment, 1st Marine Division Halyburton's Medal of Honor was officially donated to the clinic in May, 2016, where it is currently on display on the 1st floor. Naval Hospital Cherry Point realigned to Naval Health Clinic Cherry Point on October 1, 2007, as a result of recommendations made by Base Realignment and Closure. The realignment refocused the clinic's scope of care for service members, beneficiaries and retirees while divesting its ability to deliver babies, provide emergency services and maintain overnight patients.

=== Establishment of the Coastal North Carolina Marketplace: 2021 ===
On August 25, 2021, Naval Health Clinic Cherry Point joined in partnership with Naval Medical Center Camp Lejeune to form the Coastal North Carolina Market under the Defense Health Agency. This partnership streamlines patient care between the two medical facilities while sharing resources. The market is estimated to service a population of approximately 170,000 eligible beneficiaries.

=== The Joint Commission Accreditation Survey: 2022 ===
On July 11–13, Naval Health Clinic Cherry Point underwent an accreditation visit by The Joint Commission. Several departments within the clinic received commendations, to include medicine management, behavioral health and facilities with no major deficiencies found by the inspectors.

=== Establishment of the Defense Health Network Atlantic: 2023 ===
In October 2023, Naval Health Clinic Cherry Point became a member of the Defense Health Network Atlantic.

== Navy Medicine Readiness Training Command Cherry Point ==
Naval Health Clinic Cherry Point also serves as Navy Medicine Readiness Training Command Cherry Point with the mission to train and provide Sailors ready to deploy in support of operations inside the United States and abroad.

== Defense Health Network Atlantic ==
As of October 2023, Naval Health Clinic Cherry Point is a component of the Defense Health Network Atlantic.

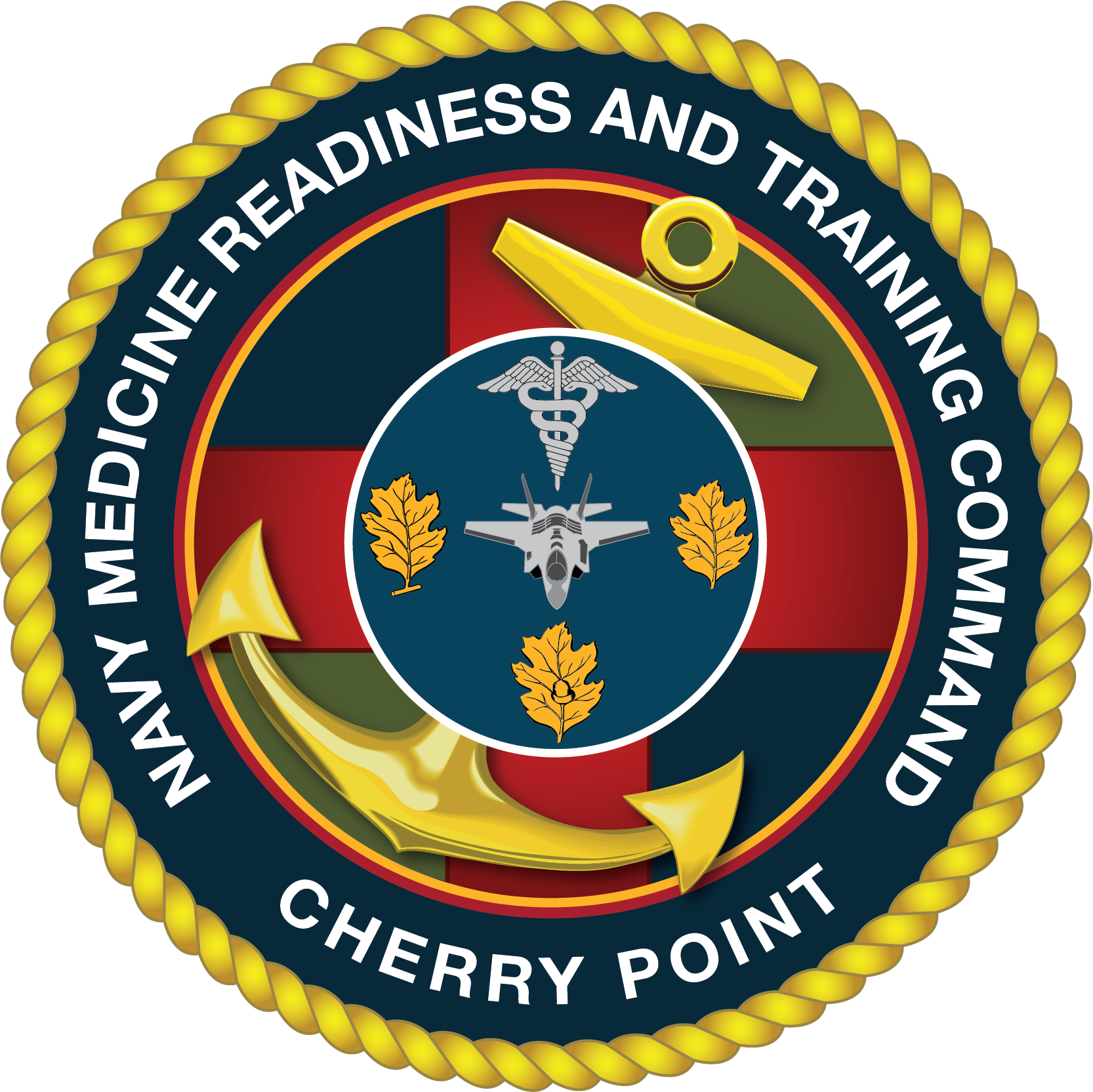
The Crest of Navy Medicine Readiness and Training Command Cherry Point, located aboard Marine Corps Air Station Cherry Point

== Patient Care and Current Operations ==
Naval Health Clinic Cherry Point's current operating hours are from 07:30 A.M. to 4:00 P.M. EST. The clinic offers a variety of out-patient medical services, to include physical therapy, behavioral health, family medicine and pharmacy. In mid-2022, the Cherry Point Women's Health Clinic opened in the facility's Medical Homeport Red Team area. The walk-in clinic operates every Tuesday from 8AM to 12 PM and offers a variety of contraceptives with no appointment necessary.
