= NMRI =

NMRI may refer to:

- Nuclear magnetic resonance imaging
- Naval Medical Research Institute, now part of the U.S. Navy's National Naval Medical Center
