= Naval Medical Research Unit Three =

U.S. Navy biomedical research laboratory

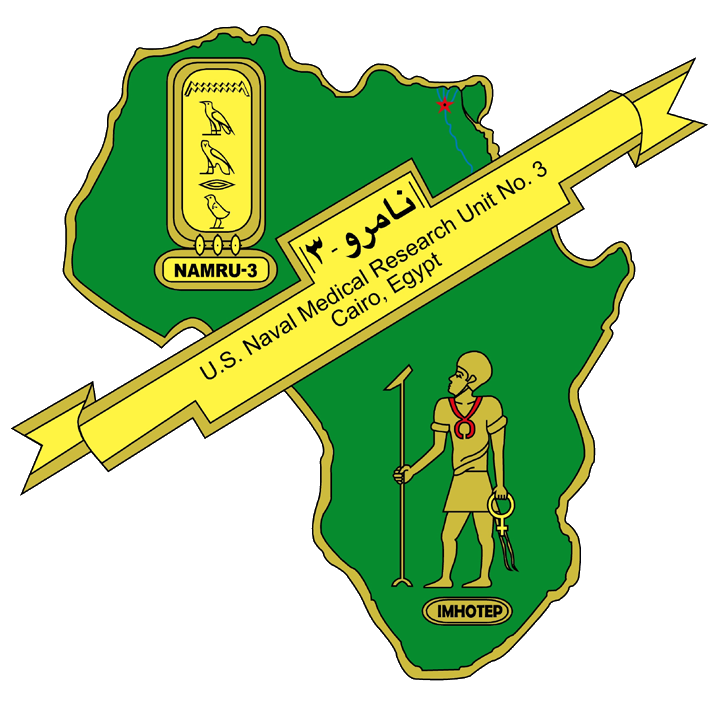
- Logo of NAMRU-3
- Active: 1946–present; 2019- in Sigonella
- Country: United States of America
- Branch: United States Navy
- Role: NAMRU-3 is the primary source of infectious diseases research in Africa and the middle east region for the US Navy.
- Part of: Naval Medical Research Center (NMRC)

Commanders
- Current commander: Captain CAPT Marshal R. Monteville

Naval Medical Research Unit Three (NAMRU-3) is a biomedical research laboratory of the US Navy located in Sigonella, Italy. Previously it was located in Cairo, Egypt. NAMRU-3 is the oldest U.S. overseas military medical research facility that has remained in the same location, and one of the largest medical research laboratories in the North Africa-Middle East region. The laboratory has been in continuous operation despite periods of political tension and a seven-year lapse in U.S.-Egyptian relations (1967–1973) since 1942.

NAMRU-3 is the first overseas Department of Defense research laboratory to receive the College of American Pathologists (CAP) Laboratory Accreditation for infectious diseases clinical diagnostics. NAMRU-3 is the only research institution in North Africa with an AAALAC International (Association for Assessment and Accreditation of Laboratory Animal Care International) accredited animal research facility and is one of only two institutions in Africa with a Biosafety Level 3 (BSL-3) laboratory. Animal research conducted at NAMRU-3 is subject to approval by an Institutional Animal Care and Use Committee (IACUC) and is focused on tropical viral, bacterial and parasitic diseases; infection of blood-feeding arthropods; and tissue harvesting techniques training. In addition to these assets, NAMRU-3 has modern laboratory spaces, a centralized medical library and access to the US National Library of Medicine. All human research conducted by NAMRU-3 is conducted under supervision of duly constituted Institutional Review Boards (IRBs).

== Mission ==
NAMRU-3's mission is to study, monitor, and detect emerging and re-emerging disease threats of military and public health importance; develop mitigation strategies against these threats in partnership with host nations and international and U.S. agencies in CENTCOM, EUCOM, and AFRICOM areas of responsibility. NAMRU-3 basic science, epidemiologic, and clinical investigations have included numerous tropical and subtropical infectious diseases such as enteric diseases, acute respiratory infections, hepatitis, tuberculosis, meningitis, HIV, and various parasitic, rickettsial, and arboviral infections that are endemic and important public health problems to the region.

The modern mission of the NAMRUs is threefold:

1. To investigate prophylactic agents such as vaccines and pharmaceuticals against tropical infectious diseases which cause severe mortality or morbidity to the US military member in the deployed environment. Generally the focus of study is ”orphan” illnesses with little or no investment by major pharmaceutical companies and include parasitic infection such as malaria and leishmaniasis, viral diseases such as dengue fever and other arboviruses, and bacterial illnesses like traveler's diarrhea (ETEC, campylobacter, shigella).
2. To augment public health and military medical infrastructure of host and partner nations by assisting in surveillance of outbreaks and providing laboratory surge capacity during pandemics.
3. To provide assistance in training host nation scientists in epidemiologic techniques or modern laboratory molecular biology methods. Via these collaborations with partner nations, the NAMRU gets to conduct research on diseases that threaten troops on deployment but are not commonly seen in the US, and to get advanced notice of impending pandemics such as avian influenza that might affect military operational readiness. The host nation benefits by getting access to state of the art treatments and protection against diseases endemic to their country and a more robust public health infrastructure and better trained microbiology and physician population. This results in both military and political benefits to both nations and as such all NAMRU personnel are considered diplomats and counted as members of the US embassy in the host country.

NAMRU-3 collaborators include the Egyptian Ministry of Health, the U.S. National Institutes of Health (NIH), the World Health Organization (WHO), the U.S. Agency for International Development (USAID) and the U.S. Centers for Disease Control and Prevention (CDC). NAMRU-3 has been a WHO Collaborating Center for HIV/AIDS since 1987. NAMRU-3 also serves as a WHO reference laboratory for influenza and meningitis in the Eastern Mediterranean Region (EMRO) and is in the process of being recognized as an Avian Influenza reference laboratory by WHO. Research partnerships exist with the countries of Yemen, Saudi Arabia, Oman, Syria, Sudan, and the Republics of Ukraine, Uzbekistan, Kyrgyzstan, Kazakhstan, and Azerbaijan.

== History ==
NAMRU-3 was informally established in Egypt in 1942 when the U.S. Typhus Commission placed a research laboratory staffed by American military scientists and technicians to work with Egyptian physicians adjoining Abbassia Fever Hospital, Cairo, Egypt, thus averting a serious typhus outbreak in the city during and following World War II. After the war, the U.S. Navy was invited by the Egyptian Government to study, prevent, and control epidemic diseases and diseases endemic in subtropical areas and NAMRU-3 was formally established by the Secretary of the Navy in the same buildings formerly occupied by the Typhus commission in 1946.

Working with the Egyptian ministry of Health, initial diseases studied included brucellosis, cholera, meningitis, schistosomiasis, smallpox and tick-borne illnesses. Dr. Harry Hoogstraal founded the Department of Medical Zoology in 1949 and amassed the world's largest collection of ticks at NAMRU-3, almost 600 unique species from over 160 countries. The lab has played a critical role in understanding several diseases. In 1962 NAMRU-3 investigators described the natural infection cycle of West Nile fever, which involves mosquitoes and birds as primary vectors and hosts. NAMRU-3 through a collaboration with the WHO in the early 1970s was instrumental in developing typhoid and Group A Meningococcal meningitis vaccines. In 2000, NAMRU-3 successfully investigated the first outbreak of Rift Valley fever outside Africa in Yemen.

In 1965 NAMRU-3 opened an Addis Ababa Detachment in Ethiopia and a collecting station in Gambela, Ethiopia and in the early 1970s a similar detachment in the Sudan focusing on malaria and leishmaniasis research. The Ethiopian detachment would go on to become NAMRU-5 in 1974. In 1967 a break in U.S.-Egyptian relations required all US diplomats to leave the country. The commanding officer was allowed to return after several months and from 1967-1974 an Egyptian co-director and the unit's Egyptian staff ran the laboratory's functions and research receiving supplies through the Embassy of Spain. In 1983 a $10 million six story biosciences building was constructed on the grounds. In the 1990s NAMRU-3 pioneered studies into prophylaxis of traveler's diarrhea with norfloxacin and treatment with ciprofloxacin and lopramide.

In 1998, NAMRU-3 became part of the newly reorganized Naval Medical Research Center.

NAMRU-3 began conducting joint malaria research projects with Ghana in 1995 and established a detachment there in 2001 with the aim of preparing skills and facilities for malaria vaccine trials. In 1999, the US Department of Defense Global Emerging Infections System (GEIS) program was established which expanded NAMRU-3's mandate to include public health activities and capacity building in host countries. In 2001 NAMRU-3 was recognized as a WHO Collaborating Center for Emerging/Re-Emerging Infectious Diseases. From 2001-11 NAMRU-3 conducted 69 disease outbreak investigations in 25 different countries. In 2007 NAMRU-3 established a detachment at Camp Lemonnier Djibouti for diarrheal disease surveillance.

== Current Activities ==
- Surveillance of avian influenza-NAMRU-3 is active in the global response to the threat of avian and pandemic influenza.
- Surveillance of febrile illness and traveler's diarrhea-It also monitors infectious disease trends among US Department of Defense personnel deployed to operational bases in Turkey, Afghanistan, and Iraq.
- Malaria vaccine research and drug resistant falciparum malaria epidemiology
- Investigation of Multi-drug resistant Nosocomial bacterial infection
- Outbreak Investigation

== Previous commanding officers ==
- CDR Robert A. Phillips
- CAPT John Seale
- CAPT James H. Boyers
- CAPT Lloyd F. Miller
- CAPT Henry A. Sparks
- CAPT Walter F. Miner
- CAPT Craig K Wallace 1982-4
- CAPT James N. Woody 1984-1988
- CAPT Al Mateczun
- CAPT Michael E. Kilpatrick
- CAPT Richard G. Hibbs jr.
- CAPT Louis E Antosek 1999-2002
- CAPT Trueman W. Sharp 2002-5
- CAPT Bruce Boynton 2005-7
- CAPT Kenneth Earhart 2007-10
- CAPT Robin Wilkening 2010-2012
- CAPT Buhari A. “Tony” Oyofo 2012-2014
- CAPT John Gilstad 2014-2016
- CAPT Andrew F. Vaughn 2016-2019
- CAPT Marshal R. Monteville 2019-2022
- CAPT Virginia S. Blackman 2022-
