= Naval Medical Research Command =

Medical research and development command of the United States Navy

Coordinates: 39°00′07″N 77°05′40″W

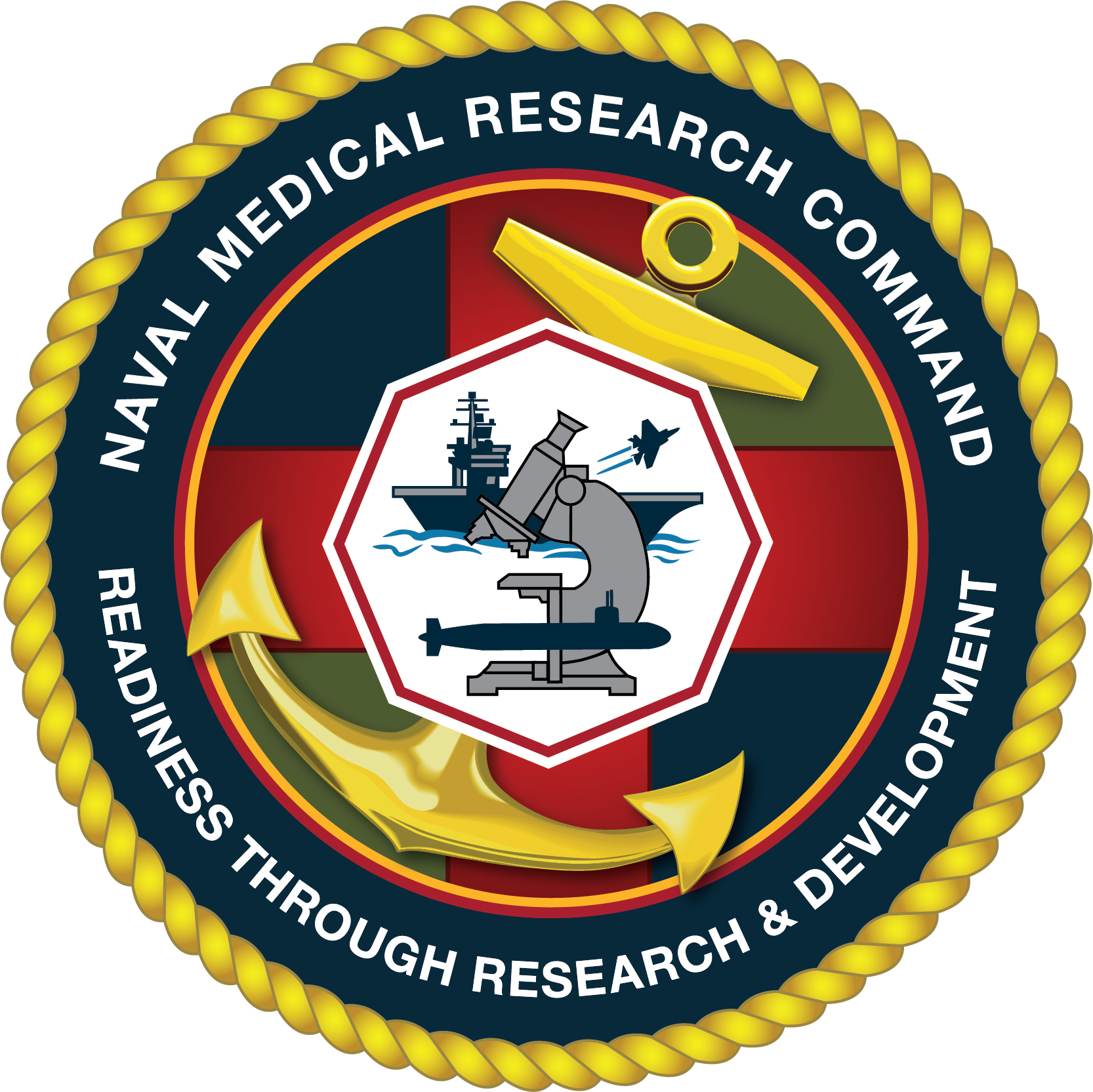
- The seal of the Naval Medical Research Command shows an optical microscope juxtaposed with outlines of an airplane, aircraft carrier, and submarine.
- Active: 1942–present
- Country: United States
- Branch: United States Navy
- Type: Research and Development
- Size: 1600+
- Part of: Bureau of Medicine and Surgery

Commanders
- Commanding Officer: Capt. Eric Welsh

The Naval Medical Research Command (NMRC) is an agency that performs basic and applied biomedical research to meet the needs of the United States Navy and United States Marine Corps. Its areas of focus include study of infectious diseases, biodefense, military medicine, battlefield medicine, and bone marrow research. NMRC is under the United States Department of the Navy's Bureau of Medicine and Surgery.

== History ==
NMRC was originally the Naval Medical Research Institute, founded in 1942, and was located on the campus of the National Naval Medical Center in Bethesda, Maryland. Besides researching health and safety issues for shipboard environments, it was involved in early radiobiology research after the development of atomic weapons, astronaut training during the 1960s Space Race, as well as the establishment of the Navy Tissue Bank and the National Marrow Donor Program.

The Navy Toxicology Unit, which had been founded in 1959 in response to air quality issues within USS Nautilus as well as toxicity concerns about replacements for flammable hydraulic fluids, was incorporated into the Naval Medical Research Institute in 1975 and moved the following year from Bethesda to Wright-Patterson Air Force Base in Dayton, Ohio so it could share resources with the Aerospace Medical Research Laboratory's Toxic Hazards Division. The unit later became the Environmental Health Effects Laboratory at Naval Medical Research Unit Dayton.

In 1998, the Naval Medical Research Institute was reorganized into the Naval Medical Research Center and became an umbrella organization for several other subordinate commands elsewhere in the nation and abroad. Since 1999, it has been located in the Forest Glen Annex in Silver Spring, Maryland. The Forest Glen Annex was originally an annex of the Walter Reed Army Medical Center, but as a result of the Base Realignment and Closure process the facility was transferred to the command of Fort Detrick in 2008. NMRC occupies the Daniel K. Inouye Building, named for the late Senator Daniel Inouye, along with the Walter Reed Army Institute of Research.

In 2023, Naval Medical Research Center was renamed to Naval Medical Research Command, to better reflect the organization's command status.

== Organization ==
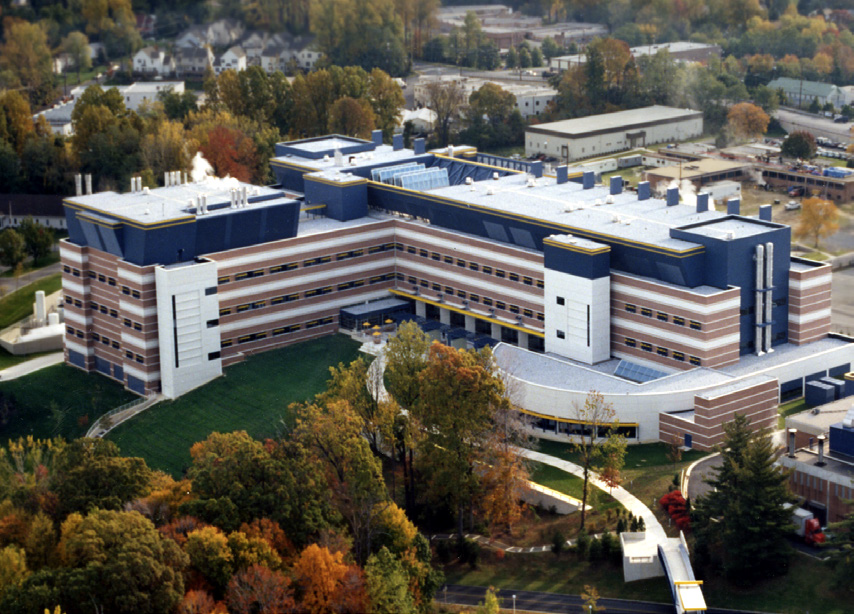
NMRC headquarters at the Daniel K. Inouye Building in the Forest Glen Annex, Silver Spring, Maryland

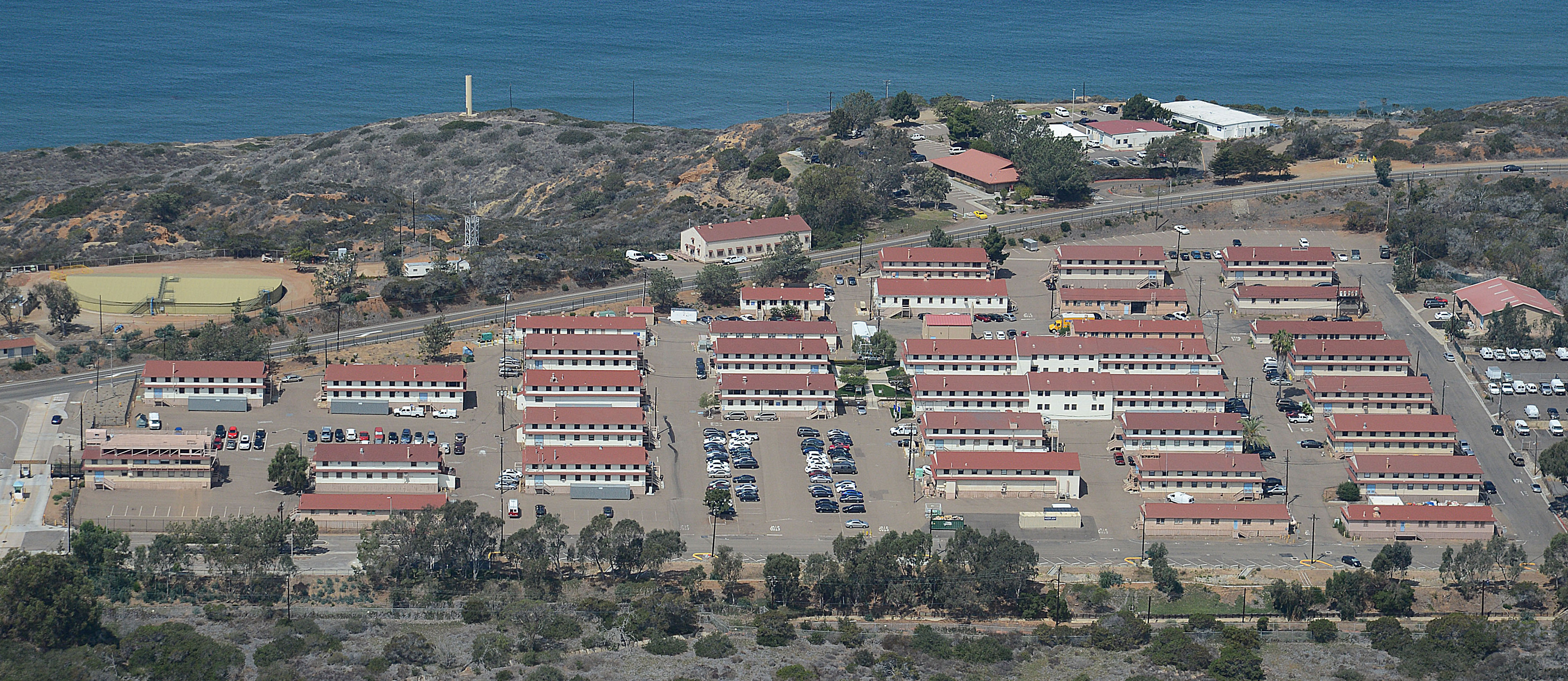
Naval Health Research Center at Naval Base Point Loma, San Diego, California

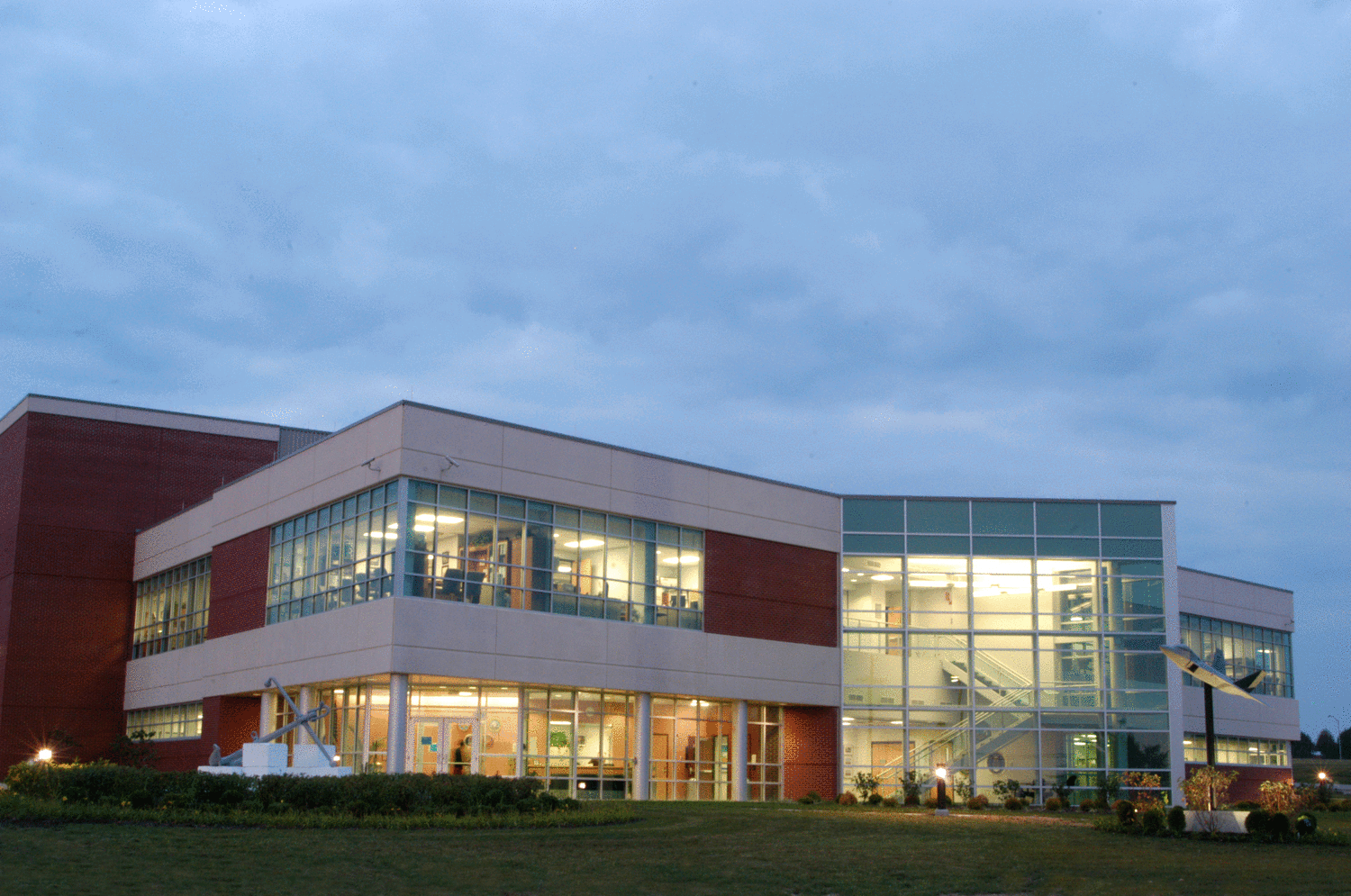
Naval Medical Research Unit Dayton at Wright-Patterson Air Force Base, Dayton, Ohio

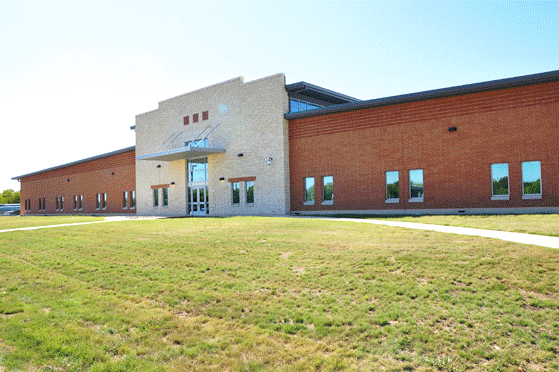
Naval Medical Research Unit San Antonio at Brooke Army Medical Center, Joint Base San Antonio, San Antonio, Texas

NMRC has 1600 employees. Its main campus in Silver Spring is divided into seven directorates:

- The Administration Directorate provides direction and support to the other directorates and sets the policy required to ensure a coordinated effort in support of command requirements.
- The Biological Defense Research Directorate researches ways to protect military personnel in the event of a biological attack.
- The Bone Marrow Research Directorate provides military contingency support for casualties with marrow toxic injury due to radiation or chemical warfare agents.
- The Infectious Diseases Directorate conducts research on infectious diseases that are considered to be significant threats to our deployed sailors, marines, soldiers, and airmen.
- The Operational and Undersea Medicine Directorate conducts medical research, development, testing, and evaluation to develop new information and technologies to enhance the health, safety, performance, and deployment readiness of Navy and Marine Corps personnel.
- The Research Services Directorate' acts as a bridge for the community's scientific investigators, and opens NMRC scientific endeavors to research applications and developments.
- The Resource Management Directorate advises the Commanding Officer on financial functions within the command.

The Naval Infectious Diseases Diagnostic Laboratory is also located in the Silver Spring facility. It provides clinical diagnostic laboratory services for active military and their families worldwide, specializing in less-common diseases not covered by the standard military treatment facilities of the Military Health System.

NMRC also has seven subordinate commands:

- Naval Health Research Center (NHRC) at Naval Base Point Loma, San Diego, California
- Naval Submarine Medical Research Laboratory (NSMRL) at Submarine Base New London, Groton, Connecticut
- Naval Medical Research Unit Dayton (NAMRU-D) at Wright-Patterson Air Force Base, Dayton, Ohio
- Naval Medical Research Unit San Antonio (NAMRU-SA) at Joint Base San Antonio, San Antonio, Texas
- Naval Medical Research Unit Three (NAMRU-3) at Sigonella Naval Air Station, Sicily, Italy
- Naval Medical Research Unit South (NAMRU SOUTH) at Centro Medico Naval, Lima, Peru
- Naval Medical Research Unit Indo Pacific (NAMRU INDO PACIFIC) at Singapore Naval Base, Singapore

Naval Medical Research Units One, Four, and Five were disestablished in the 1970s, prior to the other units' incorporation into NMRC in 1998. NAMRU-2 became NAMRU INDO PACIFIC, and NAMRU-6 became NAMRU SOUTH, in 2023.

== Former commanding officers ==
=== Naval Medical Research Institute ===
- Capt William L. Mann, MC, USN (Oct 1942–Jul 1943)
- Capt E.G. Hakanssen, MC, USN (Jul 1943–Apr 1948)
- Capt Charles F. Behrens, MC, USN (Apr 1948–Jul 1951)
- Capt Wilbur E. Kellum, MC, USN (Jun 1951–Feb 1956)
- Capt Otto E. Van Der Aue, MC, USN (Feb 1956–Dec 1960)
- Capt Henry G. Wagner, MC, USN (Dec 1960–Jul 1961)
- Capt John R. Seal, MC, USN (Jul 1961–Aug 1965)
- Capt Herschel C. Sudduth, MC, USN (Aug 1965–Jul 1970)
- Capt Tor Richter, MC, USN (Jul 1970–May 1974)
- Capt Kenneth W. Sell, MC, USN (May 1974–Sep 1977)
- Capt Walter F. Miner, MC, USN (Sep 1977–Sep 1980)
- Capt James Vorosmarti Jr, MC, USN (Sep 1980–Jan 1983)
- Capt Raymond L. Sphar, MC, USN (Jan 1983–May 1986)
- Capt Otis P. Daily, MSC, USN (May 1986–Aug 1986)
- Capt Kurt Sorensen, MC, USN (Aug 1986–Aug 1989)
- Capt Larry W. Laughlin, MC, USN (Aug 1989–Oct 1992)
- Capt Robert G. Walter, DC, USN (Oct 1992–Jun 1995)
- Capt Thomas J. Contreras, MSC, USN (Jun 1995–Oct 1998)

=== Naval Medical Research Center ===
- Capt Thomas J. Contreras, MSC, USN (Jun 1995–Oct 1998)
- Capt Richard G. Hibbs, MC, USN (Jul 1999–Jul 2001)
- Capt Richard B. Oberst, MSC, USN (Jul 2001–Oct 2004)
- Capt Edward L. Antosek, MC, USN (Oct 2004–Oct 2006)
- Capt J. Christopher Daniel, MC, USN (Oct 2006–Aug 2009)
- Capt Richard L. Haberberger Jr, MSC, USN (Aug 2009–Aug 2012)
- Capt John W. Sanders III, MC, USN (Aug 2012–Jul 2015)
- Capt Jacqueline D. Rychnovsky, NC, USN (Jul 2015–Apr 2017)
- Capt Adam W. Armstrong, MC, USN (May 2017-June 2021)
- Capt William M. Deniston, MC, USN (June 2021- July 2023)

=== Naval Medical Research Command ===
- Capt William M. Deniston, MC, USN (June 2021-July 2023)
- Capt Franca M. Jones, USN (July 2023-August 2025)
- Capt Eric R. Welsh, MSC, USN (August 2025-Current)
