= Robert Allan Phillips =

American scientist and leader in global health

Robert Allen Phillips
- Born: July 16, 1906; Clear Lake, Iowa
- Died: September 20, 1976 (aged 70); Clark Air Base, Philippines
- Education: Iowa State University; Washington University in St. Louis
- Occupation: research scientist
- Spouse: Hope N. Fuess
- Children: Seven

Robert Allan Phillips MD (July 16, 1906, in Clear Lake, Iowa – September 20, 1976) was a research scientist whose research contributed to a transformation in the treatment of cholera.

== Education ==
Phillips received his undergraduate degree at Iowa State University. He studied medicine at Washington University School of Medicine, graduating in 1929. He received a National Research Council Fellowship at Harvard Medical School and also received surgical training at Yale School of Medicine.

== Career ==
During World War II he developed battlefield methods to evaluate hemoglobin levels using specific gravity saving many lives. This method is used in blood donor clinics to determine whether a person is healthy enough to donate blood. He worked extensively on typhus during the war, including with the United States of America Typhus Commission in Cairo, Egypt and establishing a typhus laboratory at Dachau concentration camp following its liberation.

Continuing in the Navy his research turned to cholera where he spearheaded the efforts of Naval Medical Research Unit Two to develop a cure for the disease. He evaluated the course of the disease and developed the protocol for rehydration used today which has saved millions of lives. His research lead the Lasker Foundation to award him a prize in 1967. In his retirement, he collaborated with the University of Washington and the Chinese Government doing research in kidney failure again using hydration as a solution in remote areas of China where dialysis was not available.

== Marriage and family ==
He married Helena de Kay Gilder in 1938. He later married Hope N. Fuess, with whom he had several children.

== Death ==
Philipps died on September 20, 1976, at the Clark Air Base in the Philippines.
