= Naval Submarine Medical Research Laboratory =

U.S. Navy research unit for submarine and diving medicine

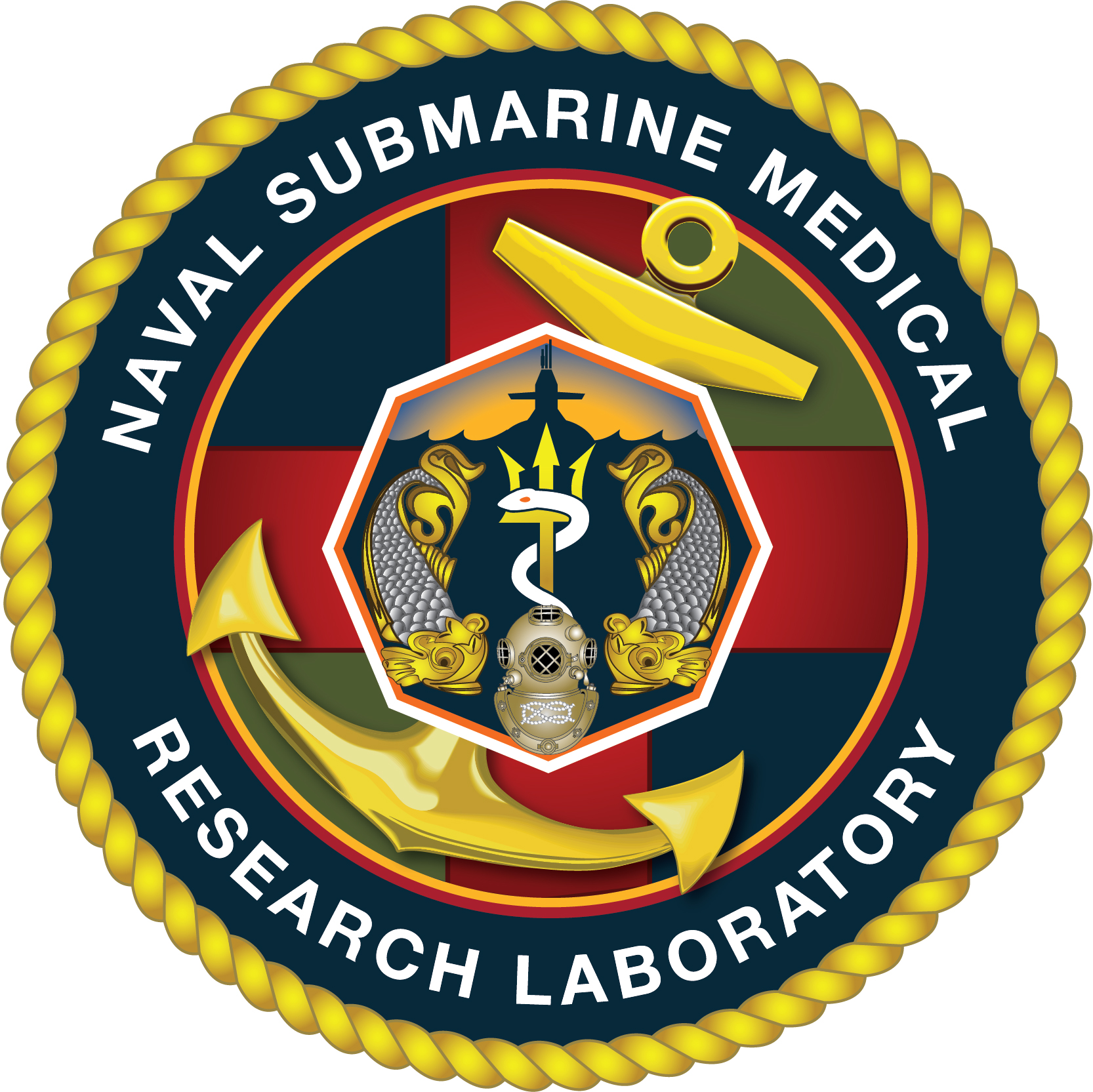
- Active: 1942-Present
- Country: United States of America
- Branch: United States Navy
- Role: NSMRL is the primary source of submarine medicine and safety information for the U.S. Navy.
- Part of: Navy Medicine Research and Development (NMRDC)
- Garrison/HQ: New London Submarine Base, Groton, Connecticut

Commanders
- Current commander: Captain Tatana M. Olson

The Naval Submarine Medical Research Laboratory (NSMRL) is located on the New London Submarine Base in Groton, Connecticut. It is a subordinate command of the Navy Medicine Research and Development Command.

== History and overview ==
NSMRL was established during World War II with a three-fold mission: select personnel for training in the Naval Submarine School; instruct hospital corpsmen and medical officers in submarine medicine, and research the medical aspects of submarine and diving operations, including night and color vision, human engineering, and personnel selection. Today NSMRL's core research and capabilities include undersea warfighter health and performance, submarine atmospheric monitoring, bioeffects of underwater sound and blast, submariner psychological fitness, submarine human systems integration, diving and hyperbaric research, submarine survival, escape, and rescue, hearing conservation, and undersea health research.

NSMRL is located in Groton, Connecticut near the mouth of the Thames River and Long Island Sound.

== Facilities ==
- Two hyperbaric chambers, saturation and hypobaric capability
- 1000 m^{3} anechoic chamber
- 145 m^{3} reverberant chamber
- Ten sound-proof audio testing booths
- Vision and auditory research suites
- Technical library
- Waterfront access (submarines and diving)
- Diving work boat

The NSMRL auditory laboratory includes a large, 1,000 m^{3} anechoic chamber. The suspended cable floor and fiberglass wedges provide an "echo-free" environment that is essential for efforts on spatialized auditory displays and transducer evaluation. Additionally, there are ten instrumented sound-proof booths and a reverberant room. These facilities are integral to the work on human-machine interfaces, combat systems displays, hearing conservation, audio signal enhancement, noise reduction techniques, and diver hearing.

The laboratory has a 142 m^{3} enclosed atmosphere testing environment and facilities for cardiopulmonary and metabolic workload assessment. It also has maintained close collaboration with the Royal Navy and its facilities at Alverstoke, England on several projects. NSMRL's diving research program is supported by a saturation diving chamber certified to pressures simulating 350 fsw and a fully instrumented hyperbaric treatment chamber. Both chambers are capable of supporting multi-diver teams and associated medical, physiological, and exercise equipment. The laboratory also maintains an enclosed 25-foot Boston Whaler equipped with GPS and radar to support open water diving research.

=== NSMRL Officers in Charge ===
CAPT Charles W. Shilling, MC, USN	Jan 1942 - Sept 1947
CAPT Thomas L. Willmon, MC, USN	Sept 1947 - Aug 1951
CDR Gerald J. Duffner, MC, USN	Aug 1951 - Sept 1956
CAPT Joseph Vogel, MC, USN	Sept 1956 - May 1959
CAPT George F. Bond, MC, USN	May 1959 - June 1964
CDR Earl H. Ninow, MC, USN (Acting)	July 1964 - Nov 1964
CAPT Walter F. Mazzone, MSC, USN (Acting)	Dec 1964 - July 1965
LCDR Paul G. Linaweaver, MC, USN	Oct 1965 - Feb 1966
CAPT Jack L. Kinsey, MC, USN (Ret) (Acting)	Feb 1966 - July 1967
CAPT Charles F. Gell, MC, USN (Ret) (Acting)	July 1967 - July 1968
CDR Joseph D. Bloom, MSC, USN	Aug 1968 - July 1972
CAPT John H. Baker, MC, USN	July 1972 - May 1973
CAPT Raymond L. Sphar, MC, USN (Acting)	June 1973 - July 1973
CAPT Raymond L. Sphar, MC, USN	July 1973 - Dec 1974

=== NSMRL Commanding Officers ===
CAPT Raymond L. Sphar, MC, USN	Dec 1974 - June 1978
CAPT Robert A. Margulies, MC, USN	June 1978 - Aug 1981
CAPT William C. Milroy, MC, USN	Aug 1981 - Aug 1985
CAPT Claude C. Harvey, MC, USN	Aug 1985 - Aug 1989
CAPT Robert G. Walter, DC, USN	Aug 1989 - Oct 1992
CAPT Paul K. Weathersby, MSC, USN	Oct 1992 - Aug 1994
CDR Stephen F. Blacke, MSC, USN	Aug 1994 - July 1995
CAPT Robert G. Walter, DC, USN	July 1995 - Aug 1997
CAPT Mark T. Wooster, MSC, USN	Aug 1997 - July 1999
CAPT Michael D. Curley, MSC, USN	July 1999 - July 2002
CAPT Garry A. Higgins, MSC, USN	July 2002 - Oct 2004
CAPT J. Christopher Daniel, MC, USN	Oct 2004 - Sept 2006
CAPT David G. Southerland, MC, USN	Sept 2006 - Sept 2009
CAPT Paul C. Kelleher, MC, USN	Sept 2009 - June 2012
CAPT Steven M. Wechsler, MC, USN	June 2012 - May 2015
CAPT Frederick E. Yeo, MC, USN	May 2015 - Aug 2018
CAPT Kim L. Lefebvre, MSC, USN	Aug 2018 - Aug 2020
CAPT Katharine K. Shobe, MSC, USN	Aug 2020 - Jul 2022
CAPT Matthew H. Jamerson, MSC, USN	Jul 2022 - Aug 2025

== See also ==
- National Board of Diving and Hyperbaric Medical Technology – Non-profit organization for education and certification in diving and hyperbaric medicine
- Institute of Naval Medicine, of the Royal Navy
- Naval Medical Research Command – Medical research and development command of the United States Navy
- Bureau of Medicine and Surgery – Agency of the U.S. Department of the Navy that manages health care activities
- United States Navy Experimental Diving Unit – US military research and development unit

== Other external links ==
- NSMRL Website
