= Naval Health Research Center =

Medical research center of the United States Navy

Coordinates: 32.700729°N 117.247547°W

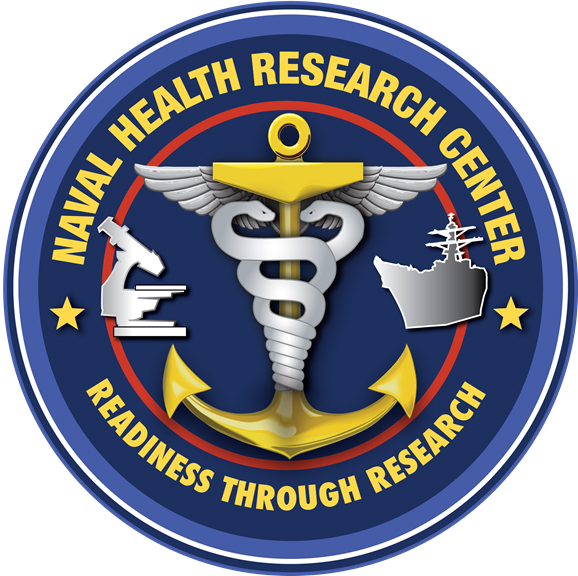
- Active: 1959 - present
- Country: United States of America
- Branch: United States Navy
- Role: Conducting research to improve and optimize the readiness of US Armed Forces.
- Part of: Naval Medical Research Command (NMRC)
- Garrison/HQ: Naval Base Point Loma (San Diego, California)

Commanders
- Current commander: Captain William M. Deniston

The Naval Health Research Center (NHRC) is a U.S. Department of Defense research center based out of Naval Base Point Loma in San Diego, California. The center undertakes research into operational readiness and infectious diseases.

The NHRC is a subordinate command of the Naval Medical Research Command, which itself is a major subordinate command of the United States Navy Bureau of Medicine (BUMED). The center now occupies 22 former barracks buildings that have been converted into research labs on the base.

== History ==
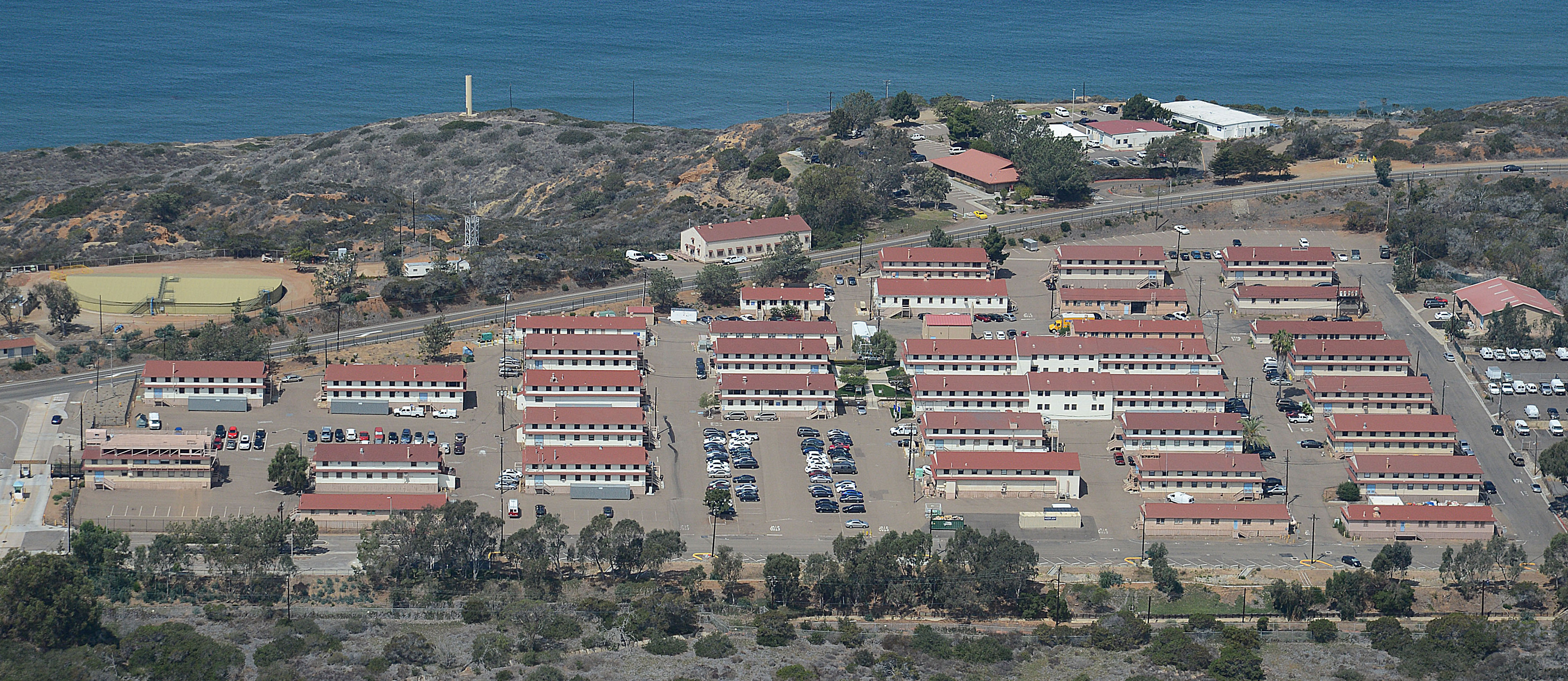
Naval Health Research Center facilities at Naval Base Point Loma

The center was originally formed in 1959 as the U.S. Navy Medical Neuropsychiatric Research Unit. It was refocused in 1974 to focus on the health on all naval personnel. It was later given the responsibility for all US armed forces personnel.

== Research ==
The NHRC undertakes research into a number of areas to increase the performance of armed forces personnel from looking at diet, sleep, environment and various other physiological factors.

The center has virtual reality suites to simulate combat environments.
