= United States Unified Medical Command =

Proposed American joint military command responsible for all aspects of healthcare

The United States Unified Medical Command was a proposed Unified Combatant Command within the United States Department of Defense. The plan was rejected in December 2006 due to heavy resistance from Air Force Surgeon General Lieutenant General James G. Roudebush, who cited mission and cultural differences among the services as justification for keeping medical assets separate.

The unified command would have merged the medical assets of the United States Navy, Air Force, and Army and reduced the duplication of effort that currently exists.

The Department of Defense instead created a governance plan that creates joint oversight in four key areas: medical research, medical education and training, health care delivery in major military markets, and shared support services.

Specifically, the Department of Defense will implement the following measures:

- Military medical research would become the responsibility of the Army Medical Research and Materiel Command at Fort Detrick, Maryland.
- Enlisted military members from all services will receive medical training at a joint center at Fort Sam Houston, Texas.
- Major military markets, particularly those in metropolitan areas such as San Antonio, Texas, and Washington, D.C., will consolidate their operations and be the responsibility of a single service.
- Support services such as information management and technology, facilities management, contracting and procurement, and logistical and financial functions will all be consolidated

To implement these changes, the Department of Defense will be creating a transition team to review options and recommend steps for implementation. The implementation process is expected to take at least two years.

Additionally, the TRICARE Management Activity will be maintained, but with more focus on health insurance, contractor management and benefit delivery. Other responsibilities such as information technology will be transferred to the support services command.
