= Naval Medical Research Unit South =

U.S. Navy biomedical research laboratory

U.S. Naval Medical Research Unit SOUTH
- Active: 1983–present
- Country: United States of America
- Branch: United States Navy
- Role: NAMRU SOUTH is the primary source of infectious diseases research in the Latin American region for the US Navy.
- Size: 16 Active duty, 300 civilians
- Part of: Naval Medical Research Command (NMRC)
- Garrison/HQ: Hospital Centro Médico Naval; Callao, Peru
- Website: https://www.med.navy.mil/Naval-Medical-Research-Command/R-D-Commands/Naval-Medical-Research-Unit-SOUTH/

Commanders
- Current commander: Captain Michael G. Prouty

Naval Medical Research Unit (NAMRU) SOUTH, formerly known as Naval Medical Research Unit Six, is a biomedical research laboratory of the U.S. Navy located in Callao, Peru. It is the only U.S. military command located in South America. Its mission is to identify infectious disease threats of military and public health importance and to develop and evaluate interventions and products to mitigate those threats.

NAMRU SOUTH consists of 143,182 square feet (13,302.0 m^{2}) of laboratory and office space in Lima and 5000 square feet of lab space in Iquitos, Peru. The Lima facility includes Biosafety Level 3 (BSL-3) facilities, while the other two laboratories are only biosafety level 2 rated. The Lima facility also contains a vivarium for animal research that is Association for Assessment and Accreditation of Laboratory Animal Care International (AAALAC) certified.

== Mission ==
Implementation of NAMRU SOUTH's mission is via threefold means:

1. to investigate prophylactic agents such as vaccines and pharmaceuticals against tropical infectious diseases which cause severe mortality or morbidity to the US military member in the deployed environment. Generally the focus of study is ”orphan” illnesses with little or no investment by major pharmaceutical companies and includes parasitic infection such as malaria and leishmaniasis, viral diseases such as dengue fever and other arboviruses, and bacterial illnesses like traveler's diarrhea (ETEC, campylobacter, shigella).
2. to augment public health and military medical infrastructure of host and partner nations by assisting in surveillance of outbreaks and providing laboratory surge capacity during pandemics.
3. to provide assistance in training host nation scientists in epidemiologic techniques or modern laboratory molecular biology methods. Via these collaborations with partner nations, the NAMRU gets to conduct research on diseases that threaten troops on deployment but are not commonly seen in the US, and to get advanced notice of impending pandemics such as avian influenza that might affect military operational readiness. The host nation benefits by getting access to state-of-the-art treatments and protection against diseases endemic to their country and a more robust public health infrastructure and better trained microbiology and physician population. This results in both military and political benefits to both nations and as such all NAMRU personnel are considered diplomats and counted as members of the US embassy in the host country.

Partner nations include ministries of Defense or Health in Honduras, El Salvador, Nicaragua, Venezuela, Ecuador, Argentina, Bolivia, Paraguay and Colombia. The lab conducts research throughout Peru including the cities and districts of Arequipa, Cuzco, Junin, La Libertad, Lambayeque, Madre De Dios, Piura, San Martin, Tumbes, Puno, Lima, Loreto and Ucayali. All animal research conducted at NAMRU SOUTH is subject to approval by an Institutional Animal Care and Use Committee (IACUC)and all human research conducted by NAMRU SOUTH is conducted under supervision of duly constituted Institutional Review Board (IRB).

== History ==
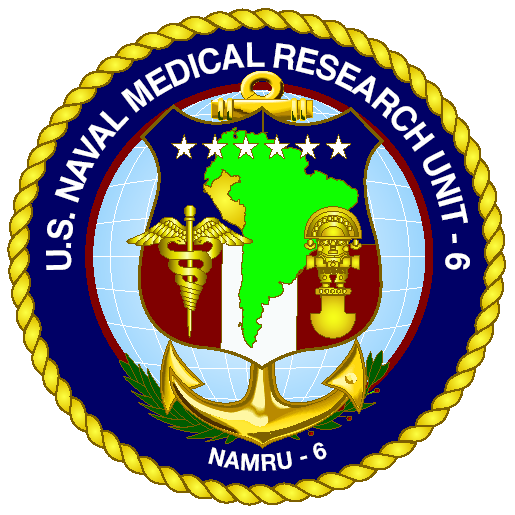
Former NAMRU-6 logo

The idea for what would become NAMRU SOUTH originated in 1978 with an idea of ADM Dileo-Paoli, the Peruvian Surgeon General, who proposed to the US Navy Surgeon General to establish a program of tropical medicine with joint participation between the US and Peruvian Navies. The command began with the arrival of 4 US Navy Active-duty members under the Officer in Charge, CDR Michael Kilpatrick on January 20, 1983.

The detachment was signed into agreement on October 21, 1983, in Lima between Fernando Schwalb Lopez Aldan, Minister of Foreign Affairs of Peru and Ambassador Frank V. Ortiz. This agreement was further signed by RADM Jorge Tenorio De la Fuente, the Peruvian Surgeon General and VADM Lewis H. Seaton the US Navy Surgeon General in Washington, D.C., on November 14, 1983. On Jan 6th 1984, The US Chief of Naval Operations established the laboratory as a detachment of Naval Medical Research Institute, Bethesda, Maryland, it was then known as the acronym NMRID. In December 1983, Rear Admiral Roger F Milnes represented the US Navy Surgeon General in a ceremony laying the cornerstone of the new 7330 meter facility, jointly funded by the Peruvian and US Navies. This first building was inaugurated on July 4, 1985, by the President of Peru, the Architect Fernando Belaunde Terry and the US Ambassador David Jordan. An annex building for animal research was inaugurated in 1987. The facility was one of the first in Peru to be able to work with BSL-3 agents such as Brucella melitensis, Yersinia pestis and Venezuelan Equine Encephalitis. Additionally in July 1985, the first clinics of investigation were inaugurated on the grounds of the Naval Clinic in Iquitos, Peru.

In 1998, NMRID became part of the newly reorganized Naval Medical Research Command. The Base Re-alignment and Closure (BRAC) process had ordered the closure of NMRI on the Bethesda campus and its relocation to the Walter Reed Forest Glen Annex with Walter Reed Army Institute of Research, where it was established as Naval Medical Research Center (NMRC), NAMRID was subsequently renamed as Naval Medical Research Center Detachment (NMRCD) to reflect the change of name of its parent command. On 16 November 2010, NMRCD officially changed its command status from a detachment of NMRC with an officer-in-charge, to a full command, U.S. Naval Medical Research Unit No. 6 (NAMRU-6), with a commanding officer.

A modern laboratory facility was constructed and inaugurated in Iquitos in July 2005 by US Ambassador Curtis Struble and Vice Admiral Jose Ricardo Rafael Aste Daffos, the head of Amazonian Operations for the Peruvian Navy.

The civilian staff has been awarded the Department of the Navy Award of Merit for Group Achievement twice, once in 1990 and again from 1995 to 1997. Important scientific achievements include completing a cholera vaccine field efficacy trial on 18,000 volunteers in Peru in 1993, development of an FDA approved rapid malaria diagnostic test (BinaxNow) from 1996 to 2001, the first clinical descriptions of Mayaro virus in 1999, the first identification of novel strains of dengue in Peru in 2000–1, investigations of HIV and hepatitis, conducting field efficacy trials resulting in region specific national malaria treatment guidelines in 2000, association of spotted fever rickettsia with an outbreak of febrile illness in 2004, demonstrating superiority of glucantime to pentamidine therapy for cutaneous leishmaniasis in 2005, developing non-human primate models of campylobacter and Enterotoxigenic Escherichia coli diarrhea, a field trial of two yellow fever vaccines in children in 2005, and the discovery of Iquitos virus in 2010.

In 2023, the laboratory was renamed U.S. Naval Medical Research Unit SOUTH to better reflect its geographical mission and commitment to Navy and regional partners in Central and South America.

== Current activities ==
- Surveillance of influenza: NAMRU SOUTH is active in the global response to the threat of avian and pandemic influenza including an outbreak of H1N1 on Peruvian ship Mollendo in 2009.
- Surveillance of febrile illness in four countries.
- Electronic Surveillance in militaries of Peru, Paraguay, Uruguay, and Ecuador using the Vigilia open-source system developed by Johns’ Hopkins Applied Physics lab
- Investigation of Multi-drug resistant Nosocomial bacterial infection
- Surveillance of traveler's diarrhea at a Spanish school in Cuzco Peru.
- Pre-clinical investigation of vaccines for Enterotoxigenic E. coli, Shigella, Campylobacter jejuni, Dengue, malaria in an Aotus nancymaae model of infection
- Development of a point of care diagnostic assay for Dengue fever
- Evaluation of insecticide treated curtains
- Evaluation of lethal ovitraps for mosquito control
- Developing a Plasmodium vivax infected mosquito model
- Evaluation of the trans-oceanic highway on disease ecology in the Amazon rainforest.
- Training in outbreak investigation methods
- Joint training in a Master's of epidemiology program
