= Naval Medical Research Unit Dayton =

U.S. Navy biomedical research laboratory

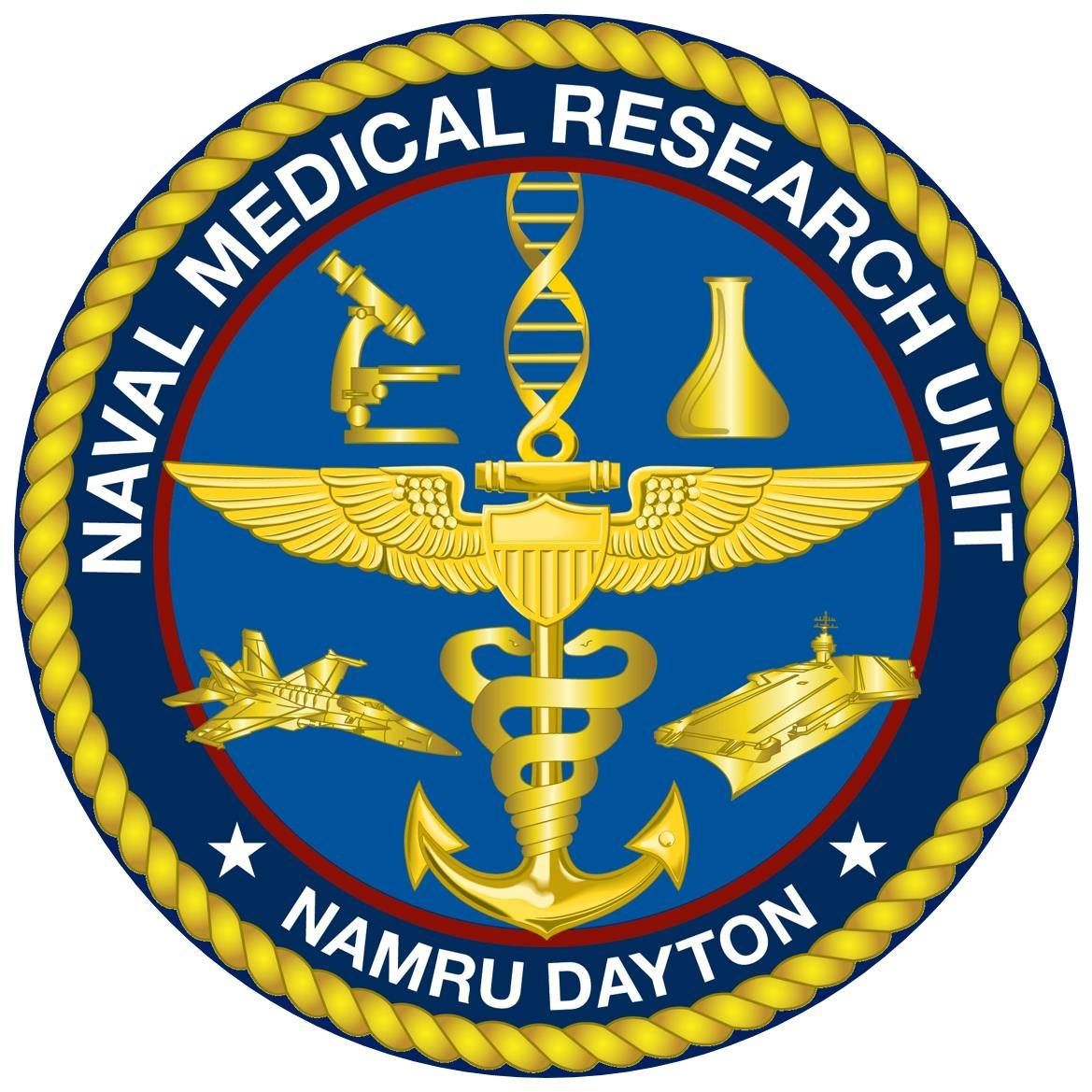
- Naval Medical Research Unit Dayton logo
- Country: United States
- Branch: United States Navy
- Type: Research and Development
- Part of: Naval Medical Research Center

Commanders
- Current commander: Captain Walter W. Dalitsch III

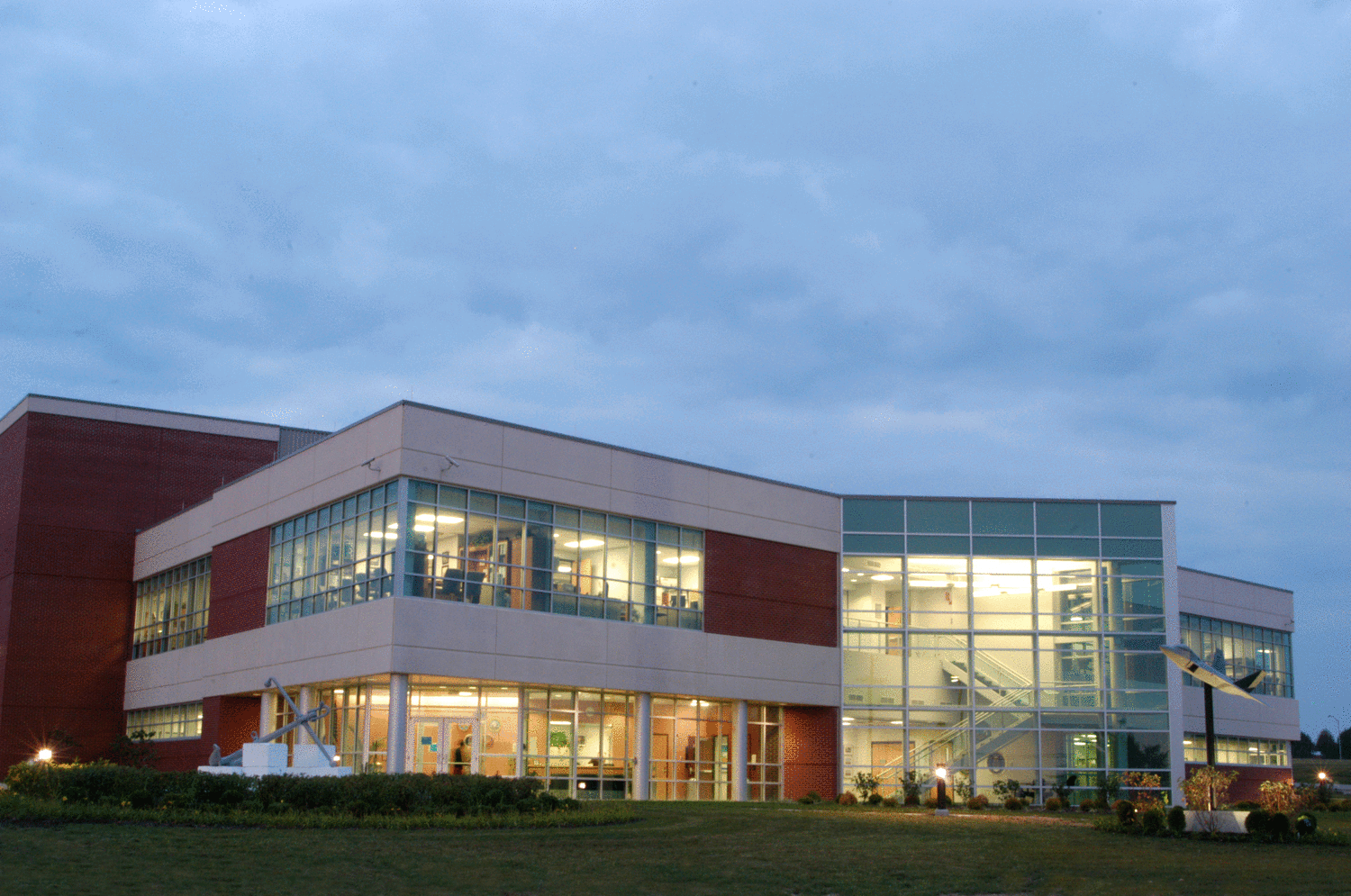
Naval Medical Research Unit Dayton building at Wright-Patterson Air Force Base

Naval Medical Research Unit Dayton (NAMRU-D) is a biomedical research laboratory of the United States Navy in Dayton, Ohio. It is one of seven subordinate commands of the Naval Medical Research Command and incorporates two research divisions. The Environmental Health Effects Laboratory was established in 1959 in Bethesda, Maryland, and moved to Dayton in 1976. NAMRU-D's predecessor organization, the Naval Aerospace Medical Research Laboratory (NAMRL), dates back to 1939 when it was established as an aviation medical research unit at Naval Air Station Pensacola, Florida. Pursuant to a 2005 Base Realignment and Closure Commission decision, NAMRL began incrementally relocating to Dayton in late 2010. and was formally disestablished at NAS Pensacola in September 2011. Despite being a Navy activity, NAMRU-D was set up on the grounds of Wright-Patterson Air Force Base at Dayton so it could be co-located with similar U.S. Air Force activities.

== History ==
The U.S. Navy Toxicology Unit was established in January 1959 in response to air quality issues within the first nuclear-powered submarine, USS Nautilus, as well as toxicity concerns about replacements for flammable hydraulic fluids. It was initially based at the National Naval Medical Center in Bethesda, Maryland, and by 1965 had 22 personnel. Around that time, its building was condemned because of structural deficiencies, but due to funding difficulties for a new building they continued to occupy it through 1976, when the building was about to be lost to termites. In May 1975, the Navy Toxicology Unit was incorporated into the Naval Medical Research Institute. The following year it was relocated to Wright-Patterson Air Force Base in Dayton, increasing collaboration with the Air Force toxicology program.

An aviation medicine research and training unit was established in 1939 at Naval Air Station Pensacola, which in 1946 became part of the newly established Naval School of Aviation Medicine, later called the Naval Aerospace Medical Institute (NAMI). In 1974 it was separated into its own independent command as the Naval Aerospace Medical Research Laboratory (NAMRL). Multiple different research projects have been conducted at NAMRL, such as research on human performance limitations by LCDR Justin S. Brown, USN, the Reduced Oxygen Breathing Device (ROBD), and the Tactile Situation Awareness System (TSAS) by Capt. Angus Rupert, USN. In June 2010, it moved to Ohio and merged with the Environmental Health Effects Laboratory to form NAMRU-D as part of the 2005 Base Realignment and Closure process.

== Leadership ==
=== Environmental Health Effects Laboratory ===
Officer	Date(s) of Tenure	Title	Unit	Location
CAPT J. Siegel, MSC	1959–1971	Officer in Charge	Navy Toxicology Unit, National Naval Medical Center	Bethesda, Maryland
LCDR T. A. Hill, MSC	1971–1972	Officer in Charge	Navy Toxicology Unit, National Naval Medical Center	Bethesda, Maryland
LCDR L. J. Jenkins, MSC	1972–1975	Officer in Charge	Navy Toxicology Unit, National Naval Medical Center	Bethesda, Maryland
CDR L. J. Jenkins, MSC	1975–1980	Officer in Charge	Toxicology Detachment, Naval Medical Research Institute	Wright–Patterson Air Force Base, Dayton, Ohio
LCDR L. L. Pitts, MSC	1980–1982	Officer in Charge	Toxicology Detachment, Naval Medical Research Institute	Wright–Patterson Air Force Base, Dayton, Ohio
CAPT D. Uddin, MSC	1982–1987	Officer in Charge	Toxicology Detachment, Naval Medical Research Institute	Wright–Patterson Air Force Base, Dayton, Ohio
CAPT D. A. Macys, MSC	1987–1994	Officer in Charge	Toxicology Detachment, Naval Medical Research Institute	Wright–Patterson Air Force Base, Dayton, Ohio
CAPT K. R. Still, MSC	1994–1998	Officer in Charge	Toxicology Detachment, Naval Medical Research Institute	Wright–Patterson Air Force Base, Dayton, Ohio
CAPT K. R. Still, MSC	1998–2002	Officer in Charge	Environmental Health Effects Laboratory, Naval Health Research Center	Wright–Patterson Air Force Base, Dayton, Ohio
CDR W. W. Jederberg, MSC	2002–2004	Officer in Charge	Environmental Health Effects Laboratory, Naval Health Research Center	Wright–Patterson Air Force Base, Dayton, Ohio
CDR G. Chapman, MSC	2004–2009	Officer in Charge	Environmental Health Effects Laboratory, Naval Health Research Center	Wright–Patterson Air Force Base, Dayton, Ohio
CDR R. Erickson, MSC	2009–2010	Officer in Charge	Environmental Health Effects Laboratory, Naval Health Research Center	Wright–Patterson Air Force Base, Dayton, Ohio

=== Naval Aerospace Medical Research Laboratory ===
Officer	Date(s) of Tenure	Title	Unit	Location
CAPT Ashton Graybiel, MC	1945–1966	Director of Research	Naval School of Aviation Medicine	Naval Air Station Pensacola, Florida
Dr. Ashton Graybiel (after retiring from active duty)	1966–1970	Director of Research	Naval School of Aviation Medicine	Naval Air Station Pensacola, Florida
CAPT N. W. Allebach, MC	1970–1974	Officer in Charge	Naval Aerospace Medical Research Laboratory	Naval Air Station Pensacola, Florida
CAPT N. W. Allebach, MC	1974–1975	Commanding Officer	Naval Aerospace Medical Research Laboratory	Naval Air Station Pensacola, Florida
CAPT Robert E. Mitchell, MC	1975–1980	Commanding Officer	Naval Aerospace Medical Research Laboratory	Naval Air Station Pensacola, Florida
CAPT W. M. Houk, MC	1980–1985	Commanding Officer	Naval Aerospace Medical Research Laboratory	Naval Air Station Pensacola, Florida
CAPT J. O. Houghton, MC	1985–1988	Commanding Officer	Naval Aerospace Medical Research Laboratory	Naval Air Station Pensacola, Florida
CAPT J. A. Brady, MSC	1988–1991	Commanding Officer	Naval Aerospace Medical Research Laboratory	Naval Air Station Pensacola, Florida
CAPT A. J. Mateczun, MC	1991–1994	Commanding Officer	Naval Aerospace Medical Research Laboratory	Naval Air Station Pensacola, Florida
CAPT J. C. Patee, MSC	1994–1996	Commanding Officer	Naval Aerospace Medical Research Laboratory	Naval Air Station Pensacola, Florida
CAPT L. H. Frank, MSC	1996–1998	Commanding Officer	Naval Aerospace Medical Research Laboratory	Naval Air Station Pensacola, Florida
CAPT C. G. Armstrong, MSC	1998–2000	Commanding Officer	Naval Aerospace Medical Research Laboratory	Naval Air Station Pensacola, Florida
CAPT M. A. Anderson, MC	2000–2003	Commanding Officer	Naval Aerospace Medical Research Laboratory	Naval Air Station Pensacola, Florida
CAPT D. M. Murdoch, MSC	2003–2005	Commanding Officer	Naval Aerospace Medical Research Laboratory	Naval Air Station Pensacola, Florida
CDR D. R. Street, MSC	2005–2008	Officer in Charge	Naval Aerospace Medical Research Laboratory	Naval Air Station Pensacola, Florida
CDR R. G. Simmon, MSC	2008–2010	Officer in Charge	Naval Aerospace Medical Research Laboratory	Naval Air Station Pensacola, Florida

=== Naval Medical Research Unit Dayton ===
Commanding Officer	Date(s) of Tenure
CAPT Keith A. Syring, MSC	2010–2012
CAPT C. D. Forcino, MSC	2012–2013
CAPT Jeffrey M. Andrews, MSC	2013–2016
CAPT R. L. Lee, MC	2016–2018
CAPT Matthew W. Hebert, MSC	2018–2019
CAPT Nimfa C. Teneza-Mora, MC	2019–2021
CAPT Walter W. Dalitsch III, MC	2021–present
