= Naval Medical Research Unit Indo Pacific =

U.S. Navy biomedical research laboratory

Naval Medical Research Unit Two
- Active: 1944–present
- Country: United States of America
- Branch: United States Navy
- Role: NAMRU-2 is the primary source of infectious diseases research in the Asia/Pacific region for the US Navy.
- Part of: Naval Medical Research Center (NMRC)
- Garrison/HQ: Phnom Penh, Cambodia

Commanders
- Current commander: Captain Patrick Blair

The Naval Medical Research Unit Indo Pacific, formerly known as Naval Medical Research Unit Two (NAMRU-2), is a biomedical research laboratory of the US Navy established with the purpose to study infectious diseases of potential military significance in Asia. NAMRU-2 is officially registered as a subordinate command of Naval Medical Research Command located on Silver Spring, Maryland, U.S. and considered as the center network of laboratories around the world.

NAMRU-2 operates in several countries in Southeast Asia, including Vietnam, Laos, Singapore, Philippines, Thailand, and Indonesia. In Phnom Penh, Cambodia, NAMRU-2 opened, outfitted, and staffed a satellite laboratory to conduct regional infectious disease outbreak research, and diagnostic laboratory support within the Office of Defense Cooperation, U.S. Embassy Singapore.

== Location ==
NAMRU-2 was founded as Naval Medical Research Unit 2, at Rockefeller University in New York City in 1944 with Captain Thomas Rivers as commanding officer. It moved to Guam in 1945 to study medical problems of the Navy and Marine Corps during World War II Pacific operations. In 1955 Commander Robert Allan Phillips convinced US naval leadership that a research presence was needed in the Pacific region. NAMRU-2 was reestablished in Taipei, Taiwan in 1955 with Captain Phillips as its commanding officer. Phillips would remain as commander for the next 10 years. In 1966, NAMRU-2 opened a detachment at the Naval Support Activity Hospital in Da Nang, South Vietnam. It was here that Lieutenant Myron Tong performed some of his seminal research into pathogens infecting combat wounds resulting in the first descriptions of acinetobacter baumannii infection in combat casualties. The research detachment would remain until 1970 when it was disestablished.

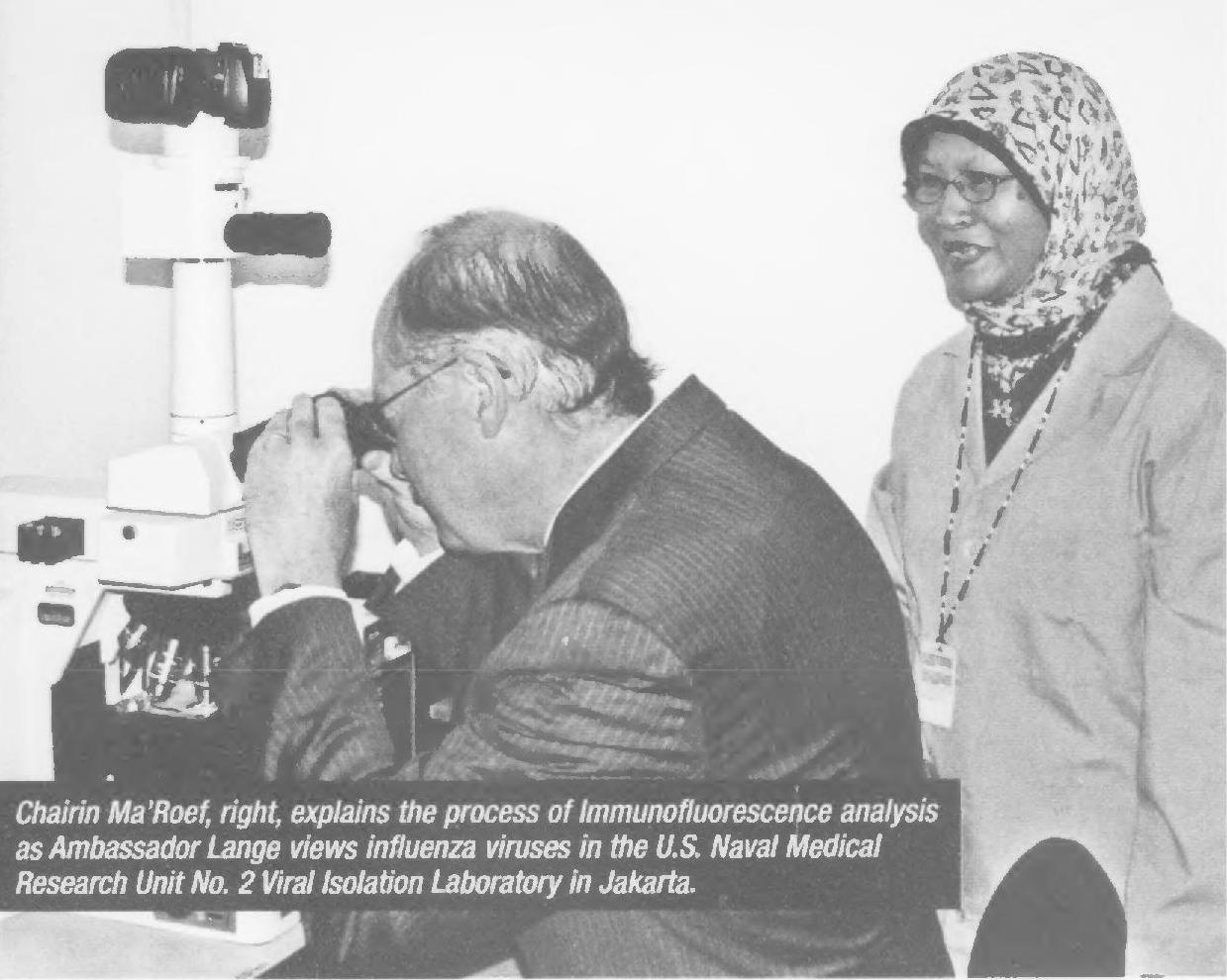
Special Representative on Avian and Pandemic Influenza John E. Lange at the Jakarta facility in 2006

In 1970, NAMRU-2 would establish a detachment in Jakarta, Indonesia upon the invitation of Indonesian Ministry of Health officials. In 1979, U.S. diplomatic recognition of the People's Republic of China resulted in the relocation of the NAMRU-2 Command from Taipei to Manila, Philippines and in 1990 due to political upheaval and possible threats to US personnel it was again relocated to Jakarta, Indonesia. The facility in Jakarta is located in 62,000 square feet of laboratory, office and storage spaces in three buildings within the Indonesian Ministry of Health, National Institutes of Health (Badan LITBANGKES) compound. In the 1990s NAMRU-2 performed cutting-edge research on the use of primaquine as primary prophylaxis for plasmodium falciparum malaria in Javanese men living in Irian Jaya. In 2000, the agreement with the Indonesian government expired and the facility was closed.

In 1998, NAMRU-2 became part of the newly reorganized Naval Medical Research Center.

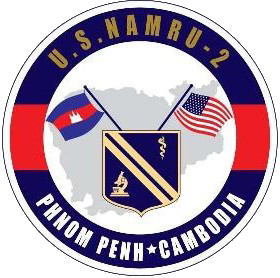
Former NAMRU-2 logo

In 2002, Phnom Penh activities were established by NAMRU-2 to conduct regional infectious disease research and diagnostic laboratory support, operating out of a laboratory located at the National Institutes of Public Health, Phnom Penh, Cambodia. In 2007, to reflect Navy Medicine's priorities in response to global emerging infectious disease threats, NAMRU-2 recognized the activities in Phnom Penh as a detachment, while at the same time opening a detachment within the Office of Defense Cooperation, U.S. Embassy Singapore.

== Achievement ==
In 1946, NAMRU-2 was redesignated the U.S. Naval Institute of Tropical Medicine (NITM) reflecting its focus on tropical infections of interest to the military such as malaria and Dengue fever. In 1947 NAMRU-2 developed a therapeutic regimen for cholera utilizing whole blood and plasma-specific gravity as guides, this work was a breakthrough in determining life-saving extracellular fluid requirements. However NITM was disestablished shortly thereafter.

NAMRU-2 would respond to Cholera epidemics in Bangkok, Thailand in 1958, Sulawesi, Indonesia and the Philippines in 1961, where it became a world leader in cholera research and treatment. In 1961 it established a collaborative research site at San Lazaro Hospital in Manila to assist in the El tor cholera outbreak in the Philippines, here several key hypotheses of correct intravenous fluid rehydration for cholera treatment were proven.

In 1969 researchers at NAMRU-2 would be the first to demonstrate the role of attenuated Rubella vaccine in preventing naturally acquired disease in man.

== Current Activities ==
- Surveillance of febrile illness
- Surveillance of avian influenza
- Investigation of Shigellosis morbidity
- Investigation of drug resistant malaria
- Medical entomology studies

== Previous commanding officers ==
- CAPT Robert Allan Phillips 1955-65
- CAPT Raymond H. Watteb 1965-1974
- CAPT Kurt Sorensen 1976-1980
- CAPT William H. Schroder 1980-1984
- CAPT Vernon D. Schinski 1984-1985
- CAPT Larry W. Laughlin 1985-1988
- CAPT James C. Coolbaugh 1988-1991
- CAPT Kurt Sorensen 1991-1992
- CAPT F. Stephen Wignall 1992-1996
- CAPT Henrik V. Peterson 1996-1999
- CAPT James R. Campbell 1999-2001
- CAPT Harry J. Beecham 2001-2004
- CAPT Mark T. Wooster 2004-2006
- CAPT Trevor R. Jones 2006-2010
- CAPT Gail L. Hathaway 2010–2012
- CAPT George B. Schoeler 2012–2013
- CAPT John Gilstad, Acting 2013
- CAPT Carlos I. LeBron 2013–2014
- CAPT Marshall R. Monteville 2014–2017
- CAPT Patrick J. Blair 2017–2020
- CAPT Jonathan M. Stahl 2020–Present

== Sources ==
- Navy Research timeline
- A Legacy in 20th-Century Medicine: Robert Allan Phillips and the Taming of Cholera
- Indonesia Turns Screw More: Booting Out US Naval Medical Laboratory?
- Tong, M. J. (1972). "Septic complications of war wounds". JAMA: The Journal of the American Medical Association. 219 (8): 1044–1047. doi:10.1001/jama.1972.03190340050011. PMID 4621762.
- Fryauff, D. J.; Baird, J. K.; Basri, H.; Sumawinata, I.; Purnomo; Richie, T. L.; Ohrt, C. K.; Mouzin, E.; Church, C. J.; Richards, A. L.; Ohrt, C.; Subianto, B.; Sandjaja, B.; Hoffman, S. (1995). "Randomised placebo-controlled trial of primaquine for prophylaxis of falciparum and vivax malaria". Lancet. 346 (8984): 1190–1193. doi:10.1016/S0140-6736(95)92898-7. PMID 7475658.
