= Naval Medical Research Unit Five =

Former US Navy research unit

Naval Medical Research Unit Five (NAMRU-5) was a research laboratory of the US Navy which was founded as a field facility of Naval Medical Research Unit 3 in Addis Ababa Ethiopia with a collecting station in Gambella on December 30, 1965 under an agreement between the US and Ethiopian governments. In 1974 NAMRU-5 was established as its own command and was housed in the Ethiopian Health and Nutrition Research Institute (former Imperial Central Laboratory Research Institute). The mission of NAMRU-5 was to conduct research and development on infectious diseases of military importance in sub-Sahara Africa. Gambella became the focus of a major malaria control effort and studies on malaria immunology. Applied research focused on the general areas of insect repellents, insecticide resistance, insect attractants and louse control.

Members of the NAMRU-5 staff were also among the last Americans to ever see smallpox before its eradication. NAMRU-5 built collaborative research efforts with the U.S. Centers for Disease Control and Prevention; with local medical facilities, including the Haile Selassie University Medical School and various hospitals in Addis Ababa; and with the London School of Tropical Medicine, the University of Washington, Case Western Reserve University Department of Medicine and the University of Maryland School of Medicine. NAMRU-5 was disestablished in April 1977 following the communist takeover of the government of Ethiopia which ordered all members out of the country in 4 days. Fields of study included:

- Louse borne typhus
- Leptospirosis
- Onchocerciasis
- Congenital syphilis
- Brancroftian filariasis
- Trypanosomiasis (African Sleeping Sickness)
- Crimean-Congo Hemorrhagic Fever
- Leishmaniasis
- Malaria
- Yellow Fever
- West Nile fever

== Commanding officers ==
- Captain Craig K. Wallace (1974-1976)
