= Naval Medical Center Camp Lejeune =

US Navy medical facility in North Carolina

Coordinates: 34°43′35″N 77°21′29″W

- Part of Defense Health Agency
- Onslow County, near Jacksonville, North Carolina

Site information
- Type: Military hospital
- Controlled by: Defense Health Agency, United States Navy

Site history
- Built: 1943

Garrison information
- Current commander: Captain Reginald Ewing, Medical Corps, United States Navy
- Past commanders

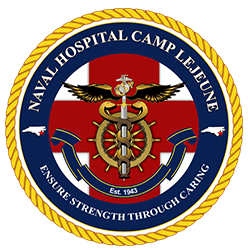

Naval Medical Center Camp Lejeune is a Defense Health Agency facility that is located on Marine Corps Base Camp Lejeune in North Carolina, USA.

Residing on one of the largest military installations on the East Coast, the hospital serves more than 150,000 active-duty military personnel, retirees, and family members alike.

In 2024, Anja Dabelić became the first female commander of Naval Medical Center Camp Lejeune.
