= Alexander Lyle (disambiguation) =

Alexander Lyle was a naval officer.

Alexander Lyle may also refer to:

- Alexander Lyle of the Lyle baronets
- Sandy Lyle (born 1958), Scottish golfer
- Alexander Lyle-Samuel (1883–1942), British businessman and politician
