= John Otto Siegel =

United States Army Medal of Honor recipient (1892–1943)

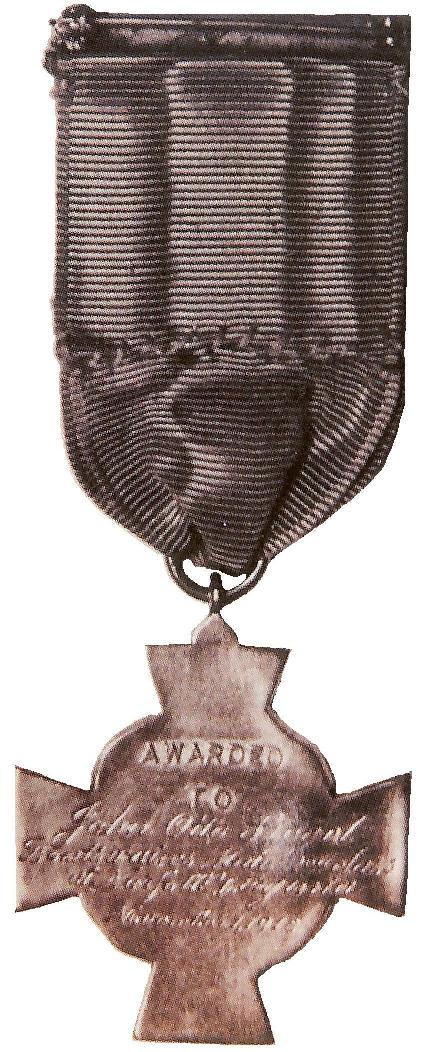
- Reverse of John Otto Siegel's; Tiffany Cross Medal of Honor
- Born: April 21, 1892; Germany
- Died: August 15, 1943 (aged 51); Gary, Indiana
- Burial place: Mt. Mercy Cemetery
- Other names: Jack Atto Siegel; John Robert Siegel
- Spouse(s): Theresa Nealis; Mary Lou
- Relatives: (Daughter) Margaret Jean Siegel
- Military career
- Allegiance: United States
- Branch: United States Navy
- Service years: 20 May 1909 - 20 Oct. 1920
- Rank: Boatswain's Mate Second Class
- Units: USS Constellation (1854) USS Hancock (AP-3); USS Virginia (BB-13); USS Franklin (1864); USS North Dakota (BB-29) Mohawk (YT-17)
- Conflicts: World War I
- Awards: Tiffany Cross Medal of Honor

John Otto Siegel (April 21, 1892 – August 15, 1943) was a United States Navy Boatswain's Mate Second Class who earned the Medal of Honor for extraordinary heroism while serving on board of the Mohawk (YT-17) during World War I.

== Early life ==
John Otto Siegel was the adopted son of Julius N. Siegel and Annie Vance, both of Germany. John was brought to the US from Germany arriving in New York via Canada in October 1899 with his mother and father. They lived for a short time in Winnipeg, Manitoba where Julius, listed as a Roman Catholic, worked as an architect. By 1903, Julius Siegel was living in Milwaukee and still working as an architect. By 1905, John and his mother are also with Julius in Milwaukee.

== Naval career ==
=== First enlistment ===
Siegel enlisted with the Navy on 21 May 1909 in Milwaukee, Wisconsin with his parents' consent just after turning 17 years of age. Siegel spent his first 7 months of service aboard USS Constellation (1854) as an "Ordinary Seaman" during the year of 1909. In 1910 Siegel transferred to USS Hancock (AP-3) for a month, then transferred to USS Virginia (BB-13) which was docked at Hampton Roads, Virginia in 1909 for modifications. During this time he spent 25 days in Norfolk Naval Hospital suffering from dementia. Siegel continued to live with his aging parents at 418 12th Street Milwaukee, WI. In December 1910 he transferred to USS Franklin (1864) where he remains until June 1911.

In 1911, Siegel was shown as an "agent" and still living with his father in Milwaukee. By the end of June he was working aboard USS North Dakota (BB-29) where he would serve the remainder of his first enlistment. In 1912, Siegel now was listed as a "sailor" at the same address with his parents.

On 22 September 1912, John married his first wife Teresa Rose Neilas, age 19 years. The marriage took place at St. James Catholic Church, Newark, New Jersey. The parents of John are listed as Julius Siegel and Anna Vance, and the parents of Teresa are listed as John Neilas and Margaret Buckley. John and Theresa moved to 156 Green Street in Newark, New Jersey.

Just two days after the marriage Siegel went on leave and was set to return to USS North Dakota on the morning of September 25, 1912. Siegel failed to return to duty and was wanted for desertion. On 23 January 1915 a reward was posted for Siegel giving his last known address and physical description. On 1 February 1915 Siegel was captured and on 6 February he was brought into the receiving ship at New York City by Detective W. L. Beers of 60 Wall Street New York City. For his desertion of two years and four months Seaman Siegel was sentenced by General Court-Martial to one and one half years of confinement and hard labor and to be dishonorably discharged at the conclusion of his sentence. His original sentence was reduced to one year but after serving only eight months Siegel was released due to his excellent conduct. During his sentence Siegel began a campaign to be re-enlisted and had recommendations, including one from the Commander of the prison ship USS Southrey where he was held.

=== Second enlistment ===
On 15 December 1917 Siegel was re-enlisted with the Navy. His draft card states he and Teresa have one child, Margaret Jean "Virginia" Siegel. His draft card also shows that he is a wagon driver "teamster" working for Wells Fargo Company Express. For the first year of his second enlistment Siegel spent his time working in the Navy Yard at Norfolk, VA.

On 1 November 1918, Siegel was working as a Boatswain's Mate 2nd Class for the US Navy on board the tugboat Mohawk (YT-17). Working in the Norfolk Naval Shipyard the Mohawk rushed to give aid to a burning ship, the schooner Hjeltenaes, which was tied up along the Beltline Bridge. Siegel was able to rescue two men from the crew's quarters and was going back a third time when he was trapped by a burst steam pipe. Overcome by the smoke, Siegel collapsed and had to be rescued by his shipmates. Medical officers worked on him most of the night fearing he would die. For his actions Siegel was recommended and awarded the Medal of Honor along with a $100 gratuity.

After a short recovery Siegel went back to the Receiving Ship in Norfolk, VA until March 1919 when he transferred to the USS Hopewell. On 16 June 1919 Siegel was once again wanted for desertion for a period of three months and six days. He was sentenced to six months restriction to Ship or Station and maintain a satisfactory record to terminate at any time after three months at the discretion of the commanding officer. Approved on 22 October 1919, the restrictions were to terminate 27 January 1920. However, on 15 March 1920 he was charged for falsehood and attempting to obtain money under false pretenses and the Commanding Officer ordered the dishonorable discharge of his second enlistment. Prior to his court-martial Siegel underwent a mental evaluation during which he stated he had been worried and exceedingly nervous for several months prior to his nomination for the Medal of Honor. He had been worried over domestic affairs and depressed after recently learning that he was adopted. However he was found fit for trial.

== Medal of Honor citation ==
- Rank and organization: Boatswain's Mate Second Class, United States Navy.

Citation:

For extraordinary heroism while serving on board the Mohawk in performing a rescue mission aboard the schooner Hjeltenaes which was in flames on 1 November 1918. Going aboard the blazing vessel, Siegel rescued 2 men from the crew's quarters and went back the third time. Immediately after he had entered the crew's quarters, a steam pipe over the door bursted, making it impossible for him to escape. Siegel was overcome with smoke and fell to the deck, being finally rescued by some of the crew of the Mohawk who carried him out and rendered first aid.

Medal Inscription

AWARDED
TO
John Otto Siegel
Boatswain's Mate 2nd Class
at Norfolk Virginia
November 1, 1918

== Later life ==
By 1920, after Siegel received a "less than honorable" discharge from the Navy, he continued to work as a driver. Later, it is believed Siegel worked as an ironworker on the Brooklyn Bridge or simply a bridge in Brooklyn, according to family.

In May 1929 Siegel wrote to the Navy and requested they give him a 3rd enlistment. He was unsuccessful in his plea. He was living at the Hotel Delaware in Milwaukee, Wisconsin.

Around 1930, Siegel abandoned his wife and daughter and headed to Oklahoma to work in the oil fields. They never divorced and he started a new life, never having any contact with them again.

In 1935, Siegel is found to be in Lavagas (believing it to be Las Vegas) per the 1940 Census records, and in 1940, Siegel is found in Baltimore, Maryland, working as a lineman in a shipyard and living with his second wife, 20 years his younger, Mary Lou Siegel from Henryetta, Oklahoma.

On 28 May 1935, the New York chapter of the Red Cross wrote a letter on behalf of John Otto Siegel to the Bureau of Navigation, Navy Department, Washington D.C. requesting a duplicate Medal of Honor be issued. The letter states that in November 1934 John was employed as an "Iron Worker" on the Boulder Dam project, in the "Death Valley Junction" of Nevada and that during this time a fire swept through the camp, believed to be Williamsville (known to its inhabitants as Ragtown) destroying all his belongings including his medal and service documents. On June 17, 1935, the Bureau replied with instruction on how to apply for a replacement medal.

On 26 November 1936, Siegel made another request that the Navy allow him to reenlist.

On 5 and 16 April 1941, Siegel wrote to the Navy requesting a replacement Medal of Honor and ribbon bar pin or at least a letter stating he was the holder of the Medal of Honor or a new station. He stated it was lost in a home fire. His return address is listed as 110 Madison Street, San Antonio, Texas. On 31 July 1941, his request is denied due to his dishonorable discharge and his previous replacement medal was sent contrary to existing instructions due to same. His ruling is compared to the Judge Advocate General's ruling on Medal of Honor nominee William Henry Jaeger, for actions 16 July 1900; with two less than honorable discharges he was approved for the Medal of Honor but the medal was not to be delivered.

On 25 April 1942 Siegel filed a World War II Registration Card under the name John Robert Siegel, born in New York City. (In prior official documents John Otto Siegel stated his birth location as Berlin, New York as well as Milwaukee, Wisconsin.) John Robert is living at Hotel London in Janesville, Wisconsin and working in Tulsa, Oklahoma with Mary Lou "someone from Henryetta, Oklahoma".

In 1943, Siegel died in Gary, Indiana of lung cancer at the age of 51. The front of his death certificate shows his middle initial as "O" and the reverse of the document has his middle initial as an "R". He is buried in Mount Mercy Cemetery in Gary, Indiana.

Social Security Application and Claims Index, 1936–2007 show Jack Atto Siegel and John Robert Siegel are the same person. The name change or modification is not explained.

Signatures from official documents of John Otto Siegel and John Robert Siegel show interesting similarities such as the "." placed after each individual name or initial. The change in the "S" is also the same between the 1941 request for a replacement Medal of Honor and the 1942 World War II Registration card. No other documents are found for anyone named John Robert Siegel or Jack Atto Siegel, that have any matching information, outside of these documents.

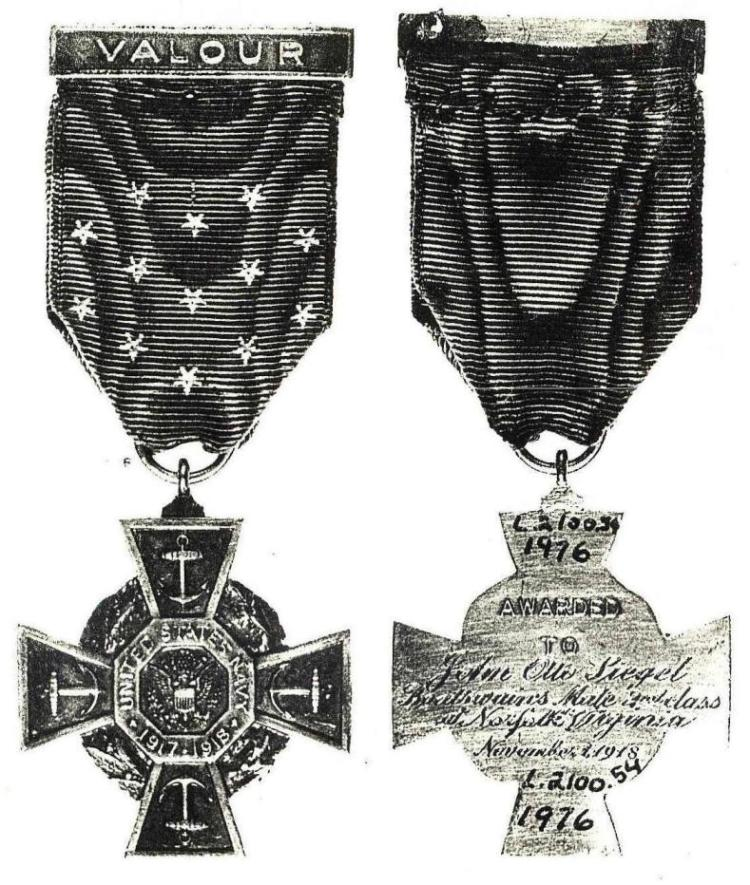
Replacement Medal of Honor issued to John Otto Siegel in 1941
Tiffany Cross Medal of Honor

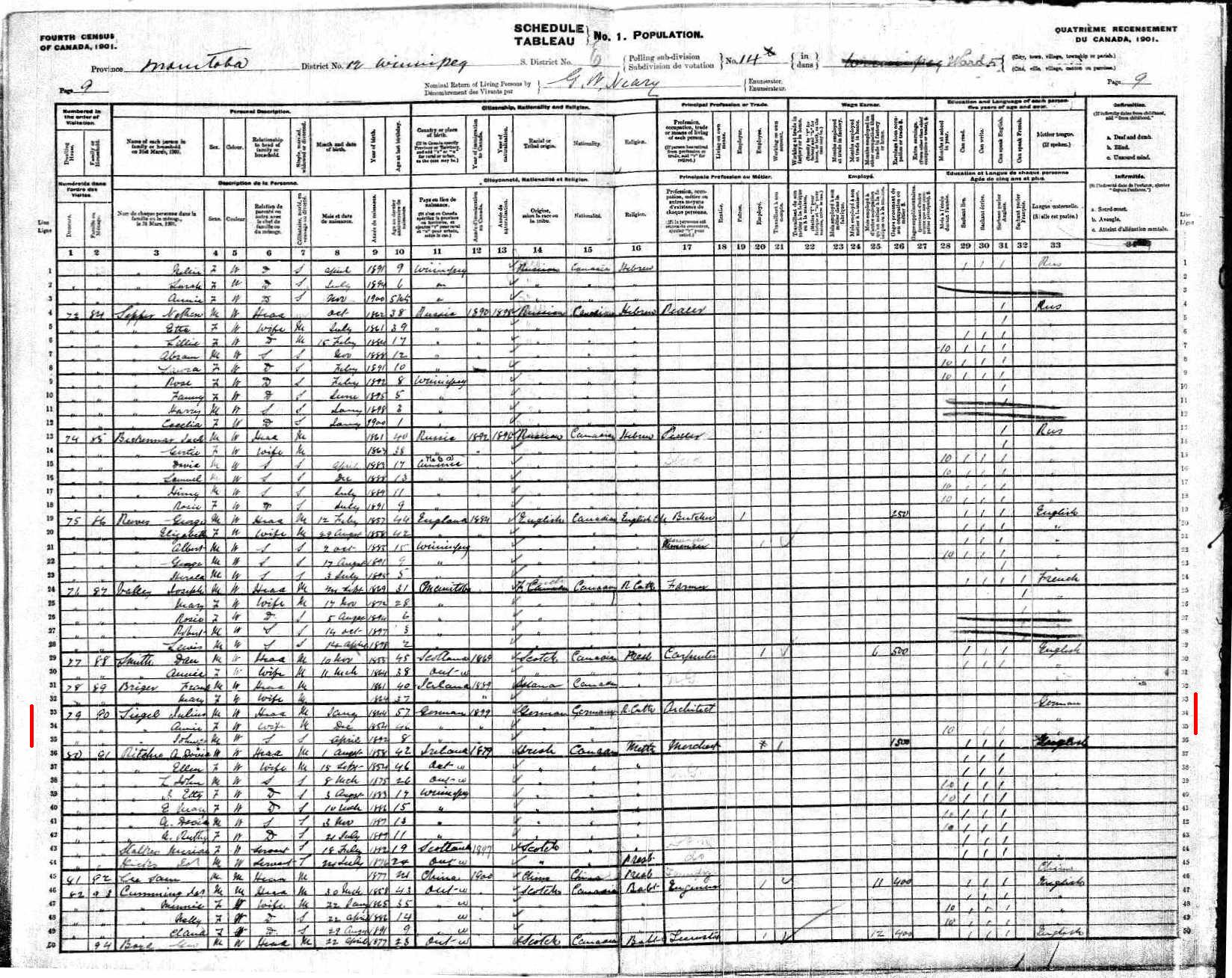
(Fourth Census of Canada, 1901) Manitoba Province, District No. 12 Winnipeg, S. District No. 6, Ward 5, Page 9 (Lines 33, 34, and 35)

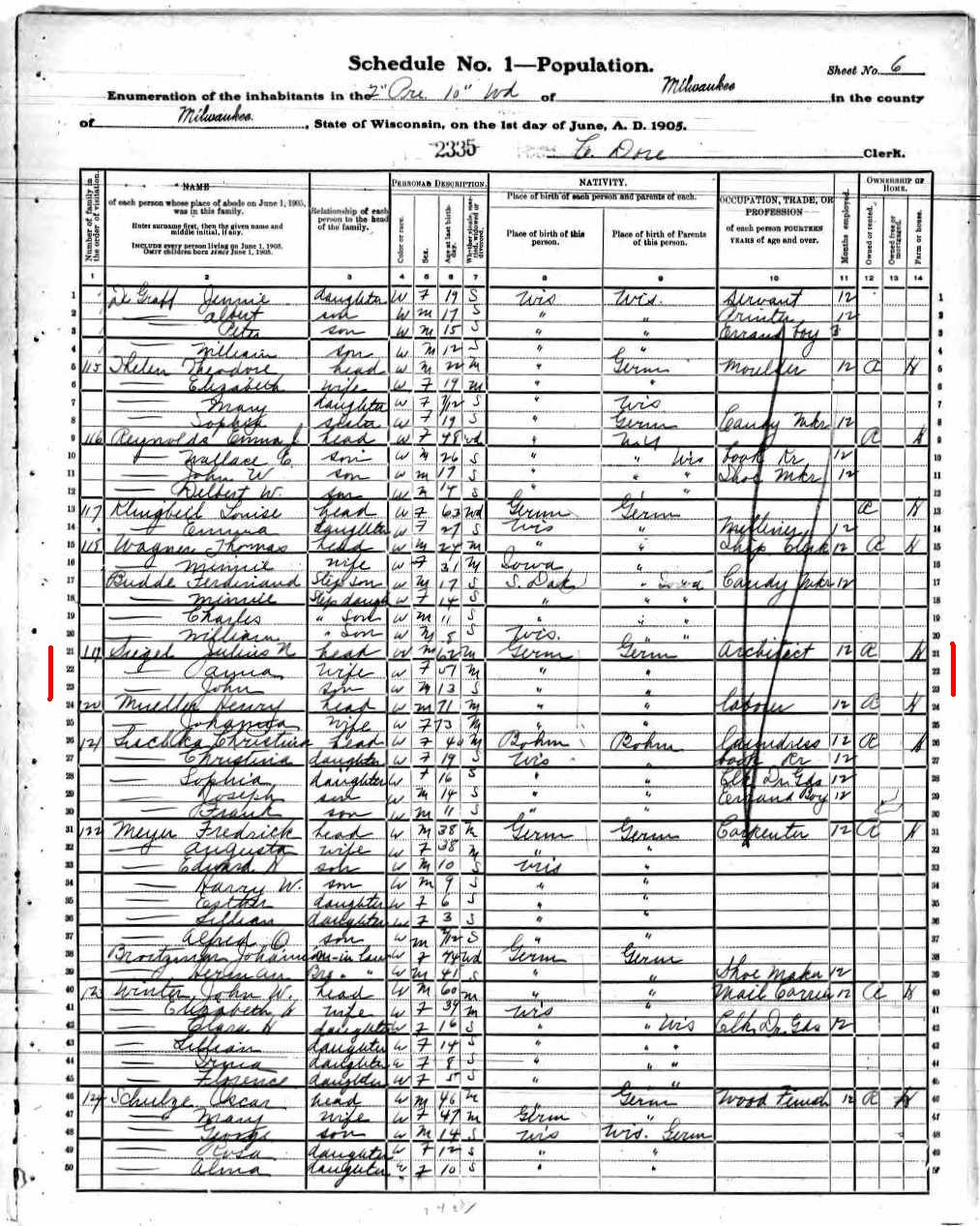
1905 Milwaukee census showing John and his parents

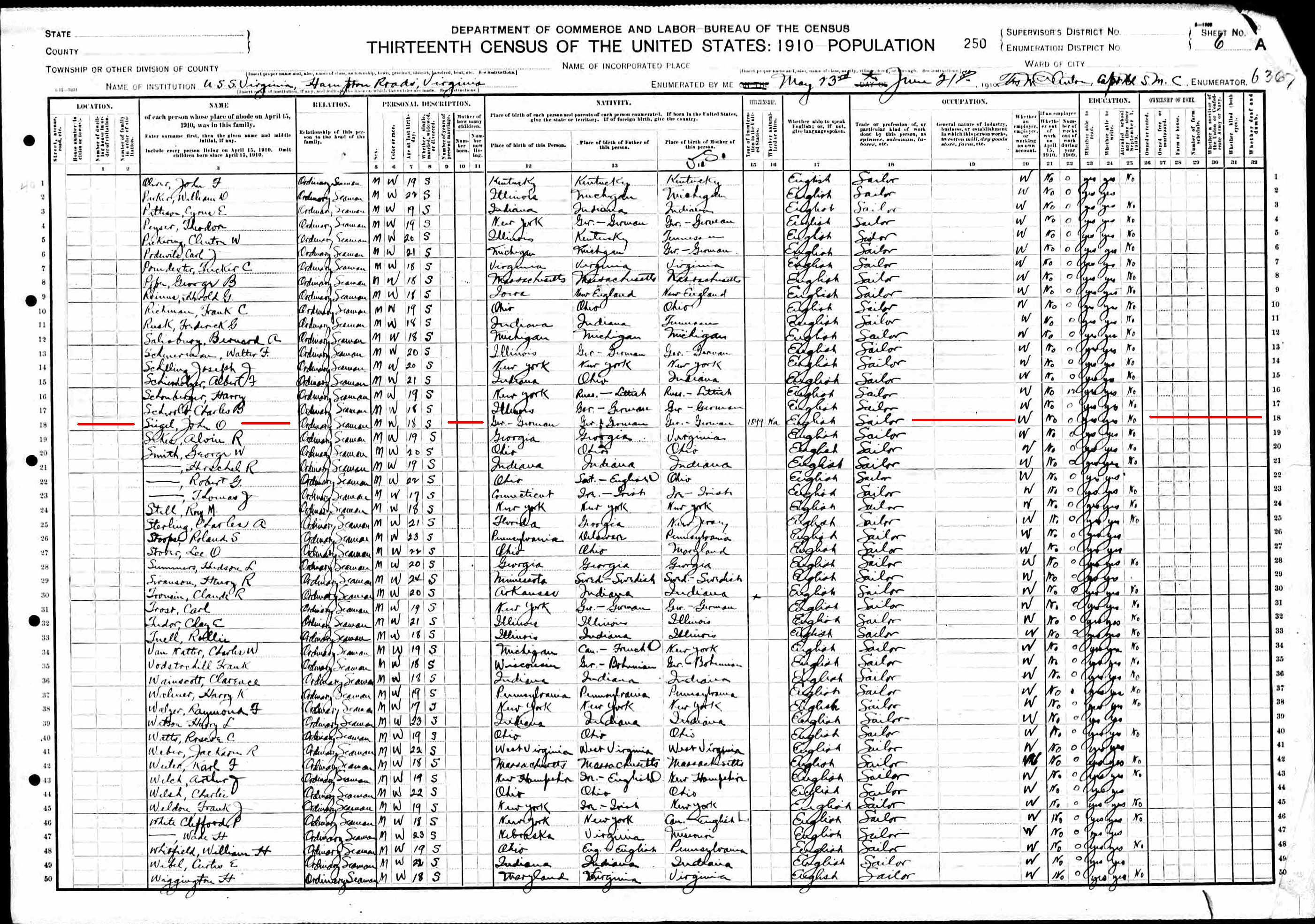
1910 Federal Census showing John on board the USS Virginia

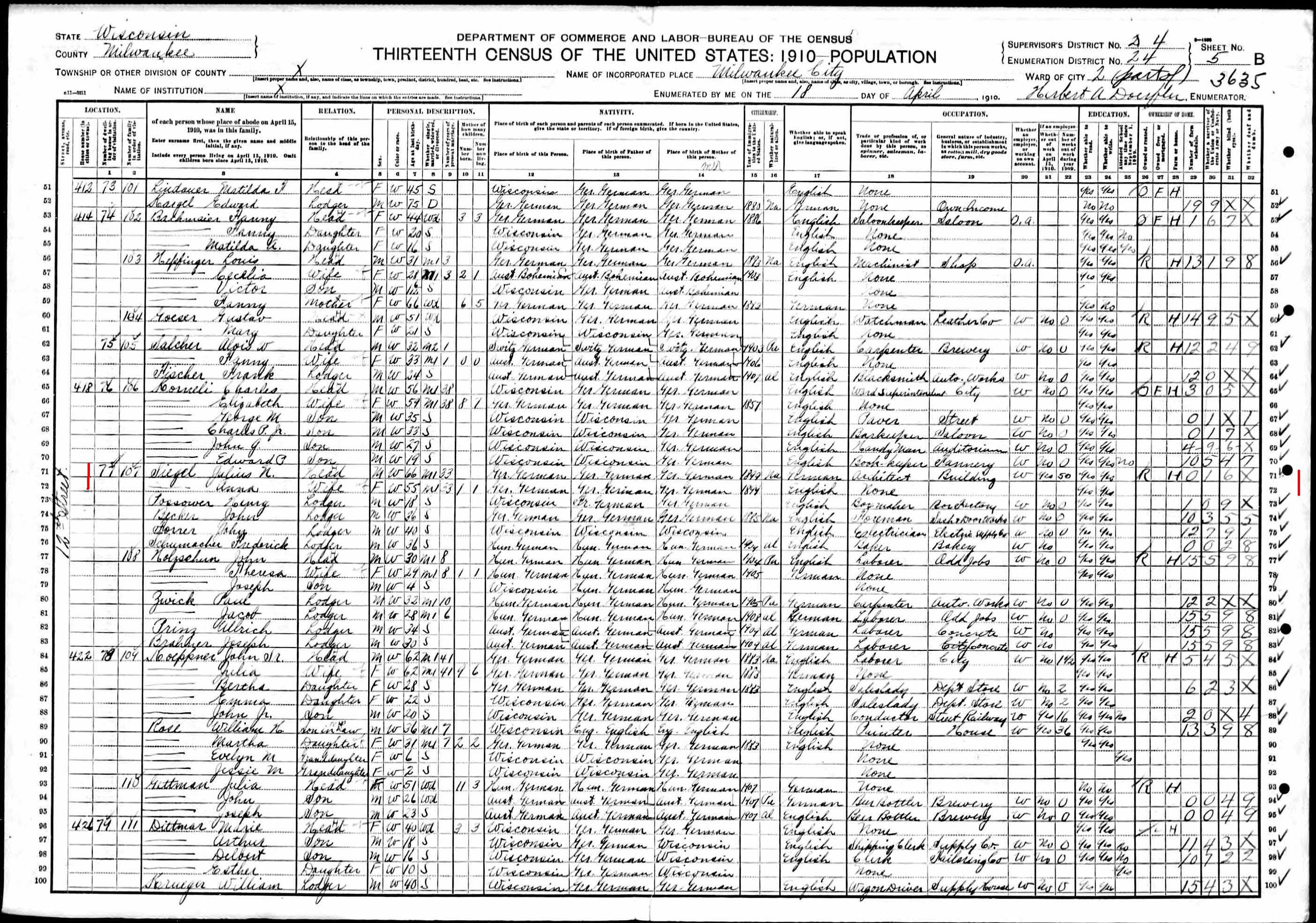
1910 Federal census listing John with his parents in Milwaukee.

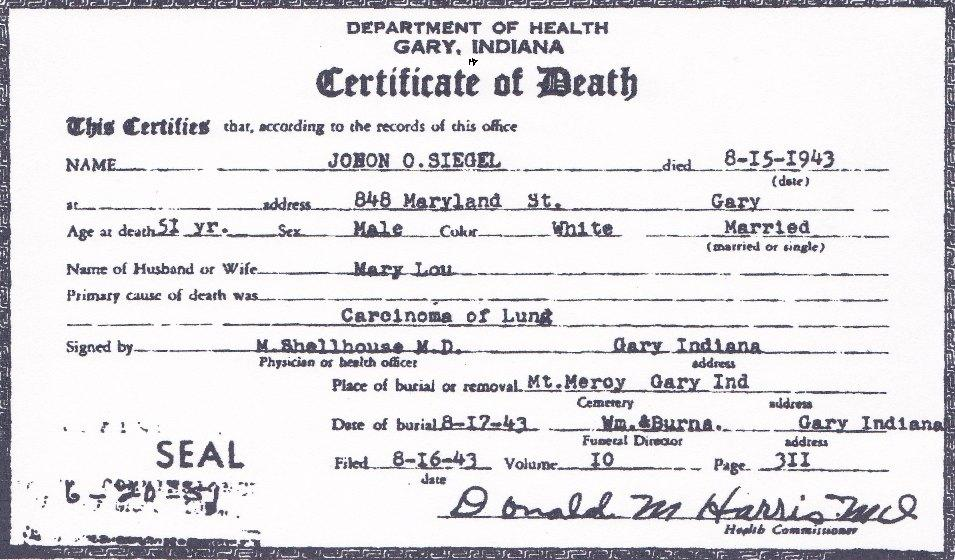
Front of Death Certificate for John Otto Siegel(With errors)

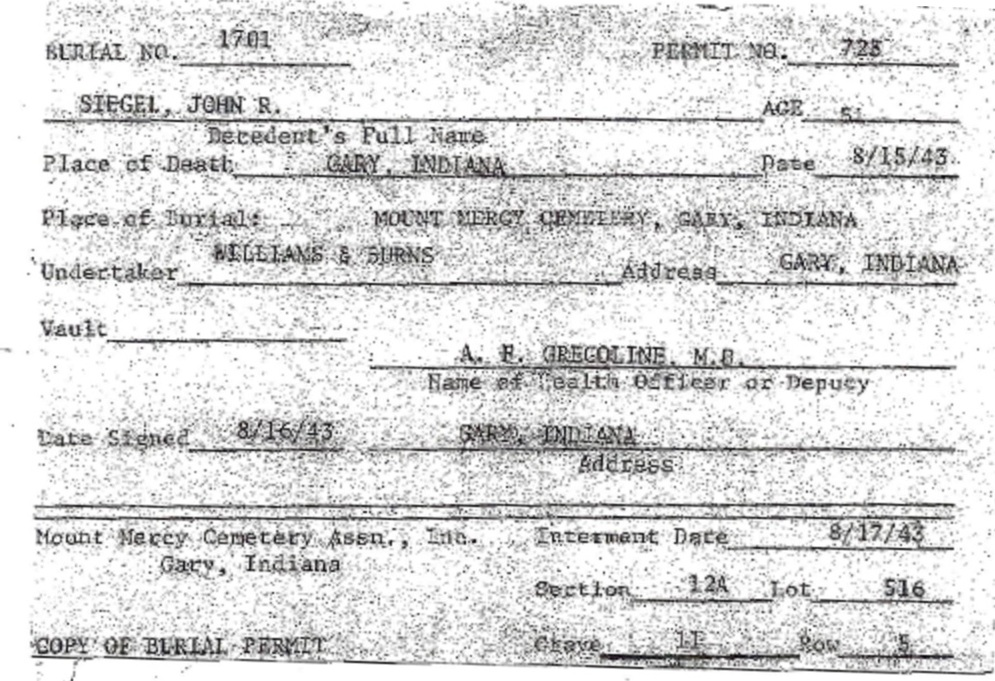
Reverse of Death Certificate for John Otto Siegel (With errors)

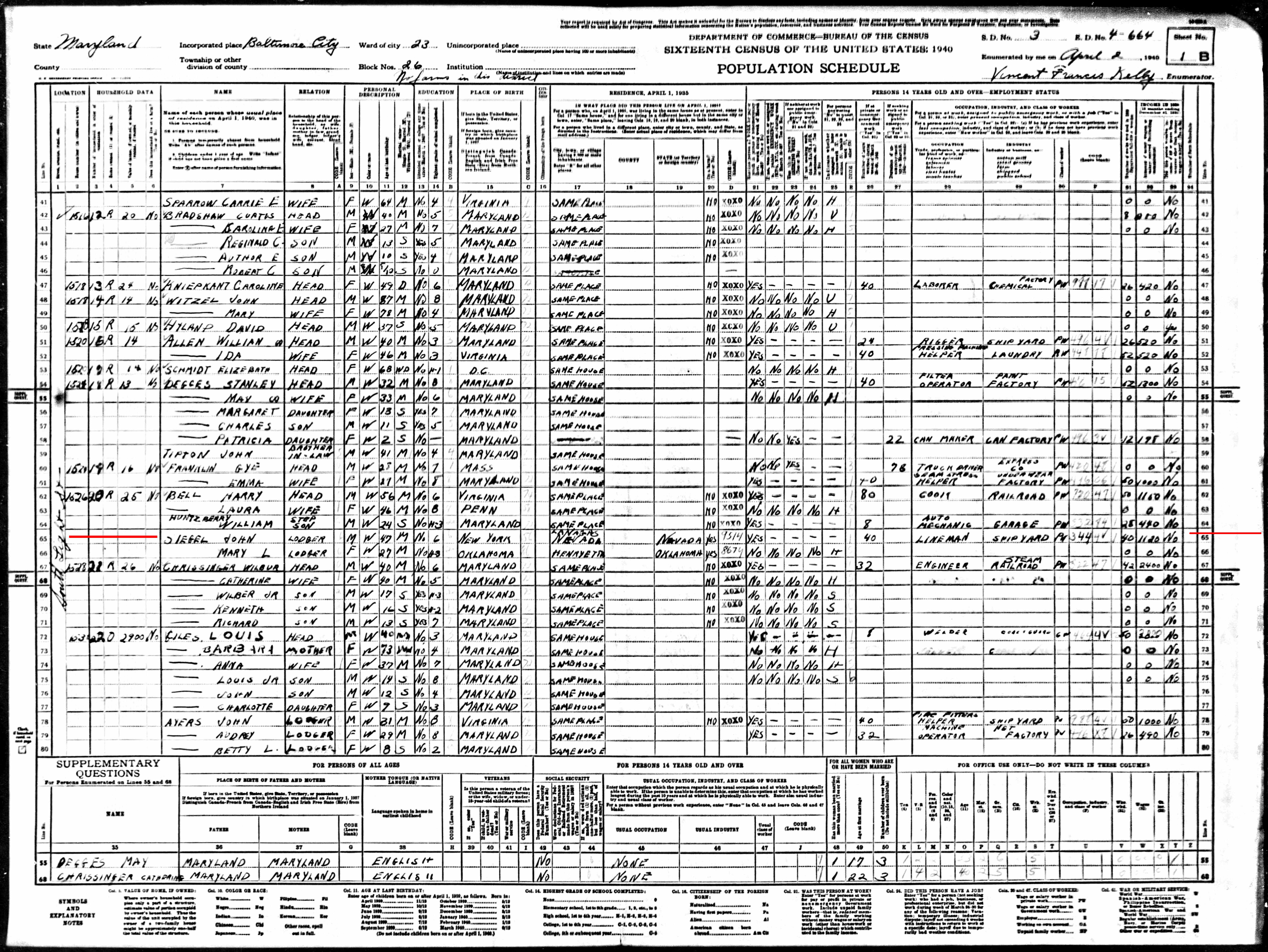
1940 Federal Census (Showing John and Mary)

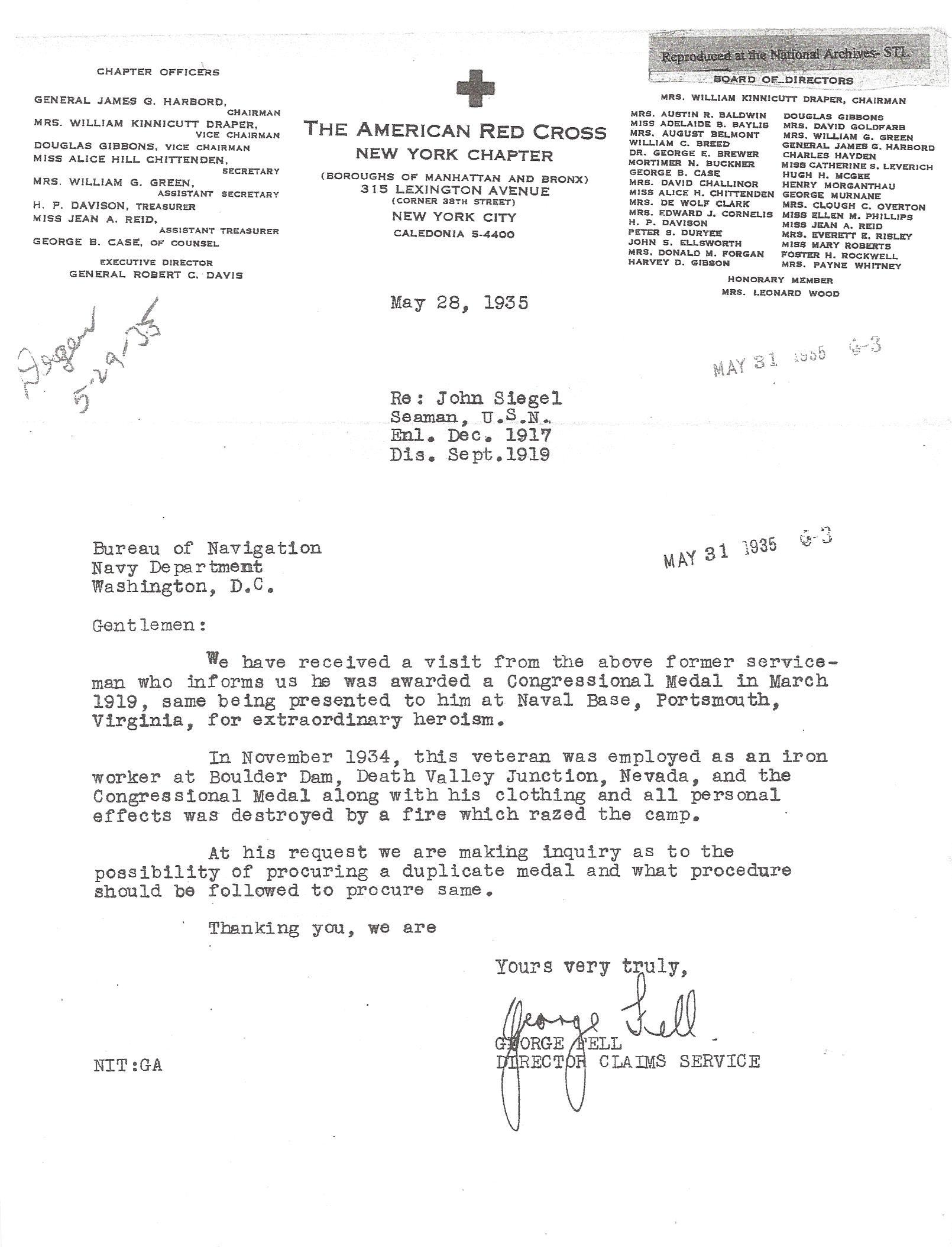
1935 Request for Duplicate Medal of Honor by the NY Red Cross on behalf of Siegel

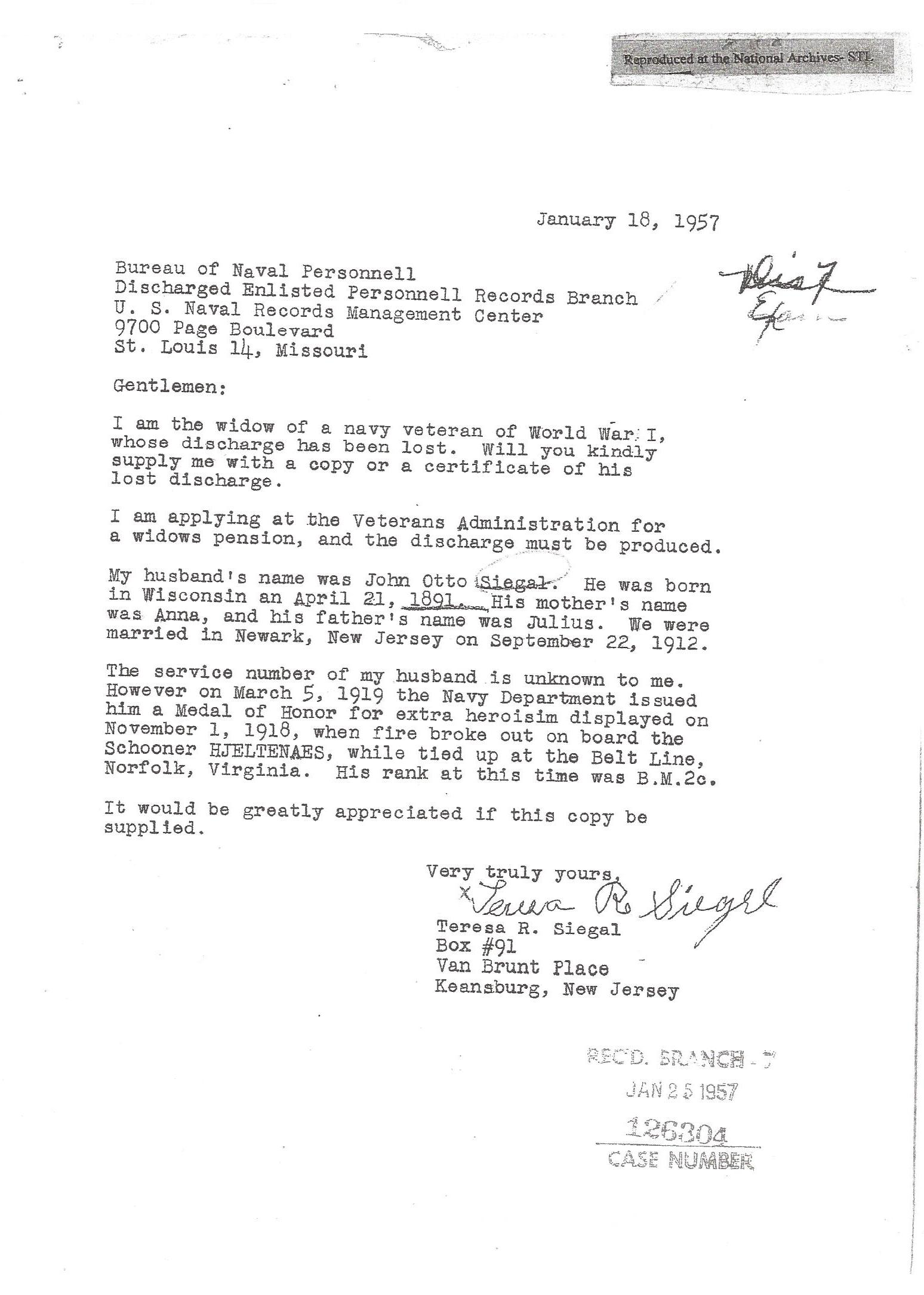
Widow, Theresa Siegel's request for pension

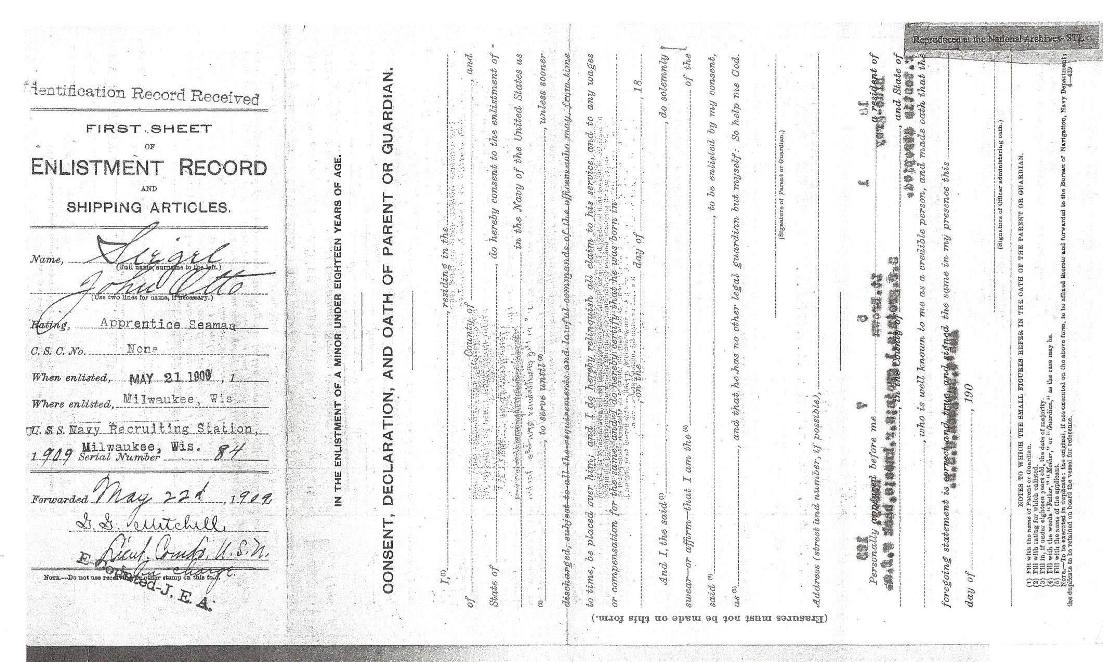
First page of Enlistment record

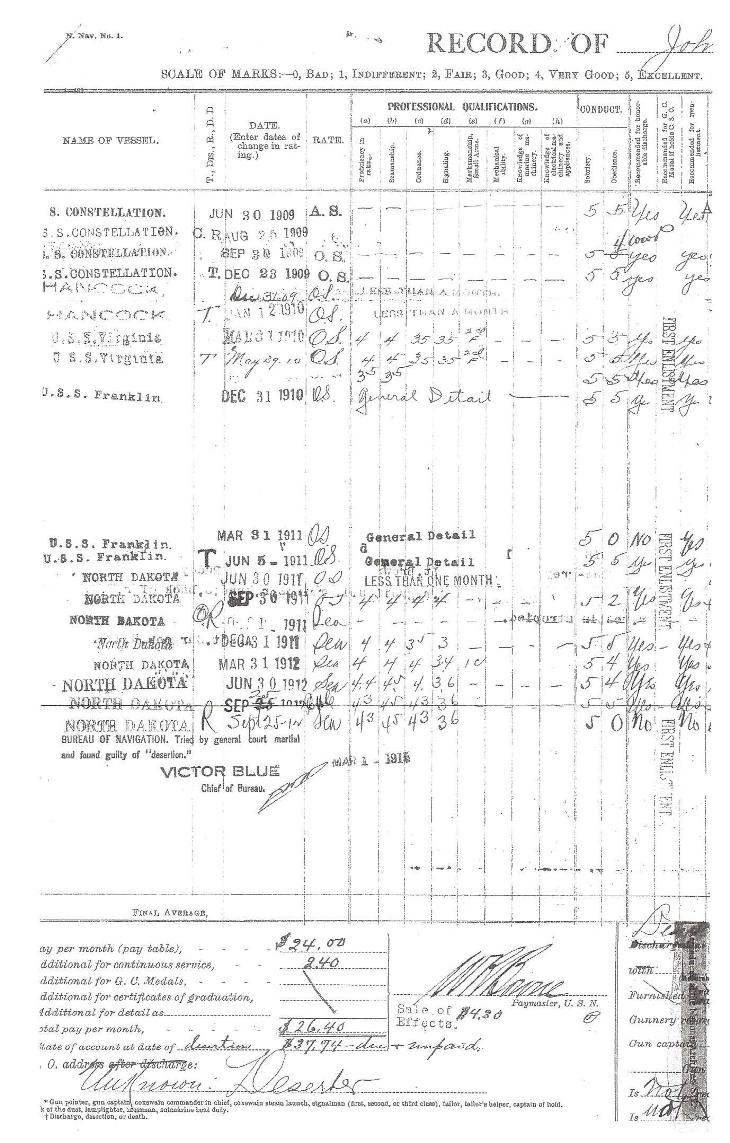
Service record from 1909 to 1912.

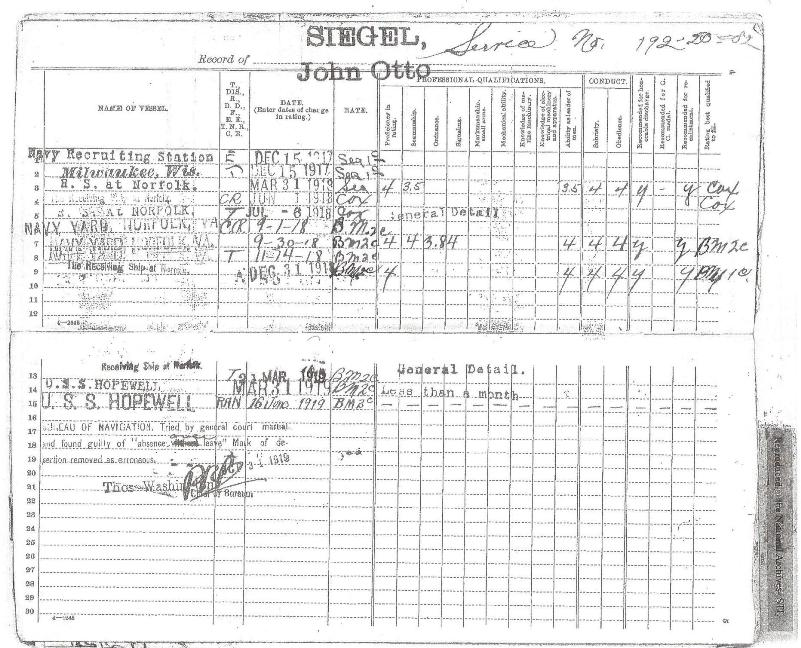
Service record from 1917 to 1919.

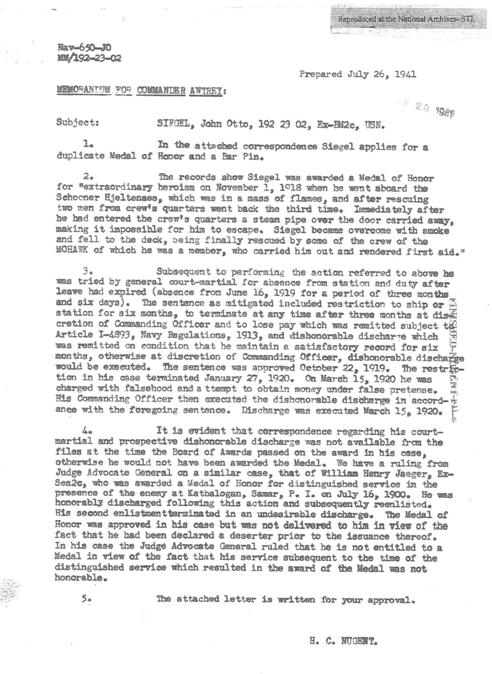
Memorandum for denial of replacement Medal of Honor, 1941.

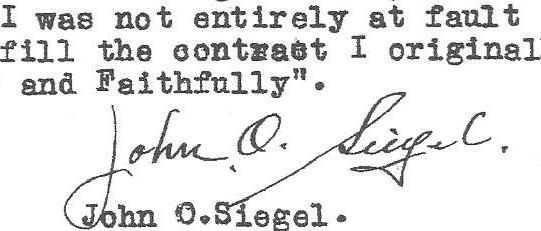
Signature of John Otto Siegel 1920

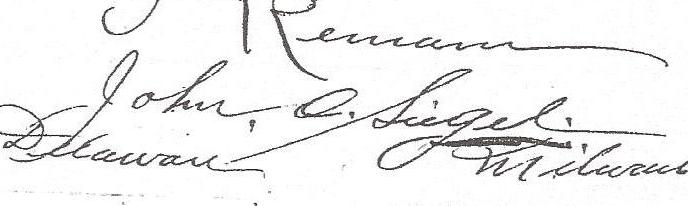
Signature of John Otto Siegel 1929

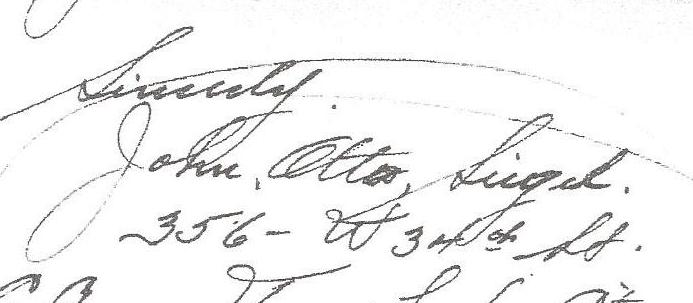
Signature of John Otto Siegel 1936

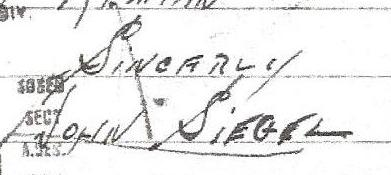
Signature of John Otto Siegel 1941

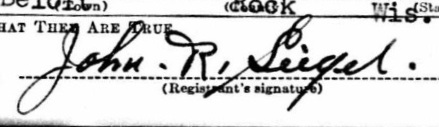
Signature of John Robert Siegel aka Jack Atto Siegel 1942

== See also ==
- List of Medal of Honor recipients for World War I
