= Ben L. Salomon =

United States Army dentist, posthumous recipient of the Medal of Honor

Benjamin L. Salomon
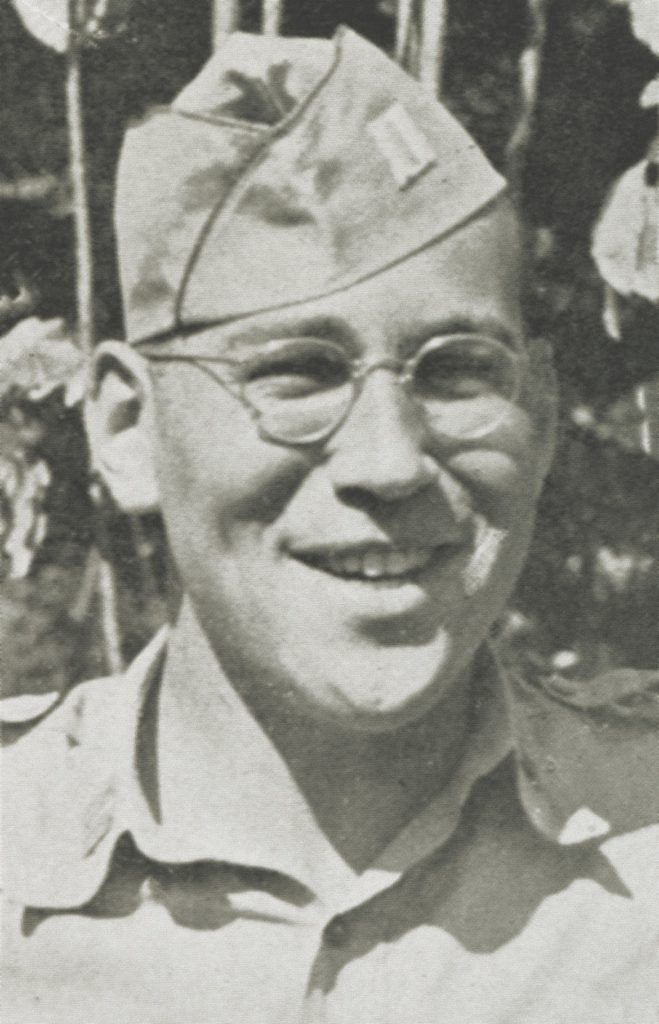
- Born: September 1, 1914; Milwaukee, Wisconsin
- Died: July 7, 1944 (aged 29); Saipan, Northern Mariana Islands, South Pacific Mandate
- Burial place: Forest Lawn Memorial Park, Glendale, California
- Military career
- Allegiance: United States of America
- Branch: United States Army
- Service years: 1940–1944
- Rank: Captain
- Units: 2nd Battalion, 105th Infantry Regiment; 27th Infantry Division
- Conflicts: World War II: Battle of Saipan †
- Awards: Medal of Honor; Purple Heart

Benjamin Lewis Salomon (September 1, 1914 – July 7, 1944) was a United States Army dentist during World War II, assigned as a front-line surgeon. During the Battle of Saipan, when the Japanese started overrunning his hospital, he stood a rear-guard action in which he had no hope of personal survival, allowing the safe evacuation of the wounded, killing as many as 98 enemy troops before being killed himself. In 2002, Salomon posthumously received the Medal of Honor. He is one of only three dental officers to have received the medal, the others being Alexander Gordon Lyle and Weedon Osborne, and is one of three Jewish American soldiers who received the medal for World War II.

== Biography ==
Salomon was born to a Jewish family in Milwaukee, Wisconsin, on September 1, 1914. He was an Eagle Scout, one of nine who were awarded the Medal of Honor. He graduated from Shorewood High School and attended Marquette University, before transferring to the University of Southern California, where he completed his undergraduate degree. He graduated from the USC Dental School in 1937 and began a dental practice.

In 1940, he was drafted into the United States Army and began his military service as an infantry private, qualifying expert in rifle and pistol. In 1942, he was notified that he would become an officer in the Army Dental Corps and was commissioned a first lieutenant. On August 14, 1942, the 102nd Infantry Regt. commanding officer declared him the unit's "best all around soldier". In May 1943, he was serving as the regimental dental officer of the 105th Infantry Regiment, 27th Infantry Division. He was promoted to the rank of captain in 1944.

In June 1944, Salomon saw his first combat — going ashore on Saipan with the 105th Infantry. With little dental work to do during active combat, Salomon volunteered to replace the 2nd Battalion's surgeon, who had been wounded. As the 2nd Battalion advanced, casualties were high. On July 7, Salomon's aid station was set up only 50 yards behind the forward foxhole line. Fighting was heavy and a major Japanese assault soon overran the perimeter, then the aid station. Salomon was able to grab an M1 Garand that was near him, kill the enemy that entered the hospital tent, and ordered the wounded to be evacuated, while he stayed and fired upon the incoming enemy with an M1917A1 Browning machine gun to cover their withdrawal.

When an Army team returned to the site days later, Salomon's body was found slumped over the machine gun, with the bodies of 98 enemy troops piled up in front of his position. His body had 76 bullet wounds and numerous bayonet wounds, up to 24 of which may had been received while he was still alive.

== Medal of Honor recognition ==
Capt. Edmund G. Love, the 27th Division historian, was a part of the team that found Salomon's body. At the request of Brig. Gen. Ogden J. Ross, the assistant commander of the 27th Division, Love gathered eyewitness accounts and prepared a recommendation for the Medal of Honor for Salomon.

The recommendation was returned by Major Gen. George W. Griner, the commanding general of the 27th Division. Officially, Griner declined to approve the award because Salomon was "in the medical service and wore a Red Cross brassard upon his arm. Under the rules of the Geneva Convention, to which the United States subscribes, no medical officer can bear arms against the enemy." However, the guideline for awarding the Medal of Honor to medical non-combatants states that one may not receive the Medal of Honor for actions in an offensive. More recent interpretations of the convention, as well as the US Laws of Land Warfare, allow use of personal weapons (i.e., rifles and pistols) in self-defense or in defense of patients and staff, as long as the medical soldier does not wear the Red Cross. Part of the problem in Salomon's citation was that a machine gun is considered a "crew-served" weapon, not an individual one.

In 1951, Love again resubmitted the recommendation through the Office of the Chief of Military History. The recommendation was returned without action with another pro-forma reason: the time limit for submitting World War II awards had passed. In 1969, another Medal of Honor recommendation was submitted by Lt. Gen. Hal B. Jennings, the Surgeon General of the United States Army. In 1970, Stanley R. Resor, Secretary of the Army, recommended approval and forwarded the recommendation to the Secretary of Defense. The recommendation was returned without action.

In 1998, the recommendation was re-submitted by Dr. Robert West (USC Dental School) through Congressman Brad Sherman, with the support of Maj. Gen. Patrick D. Sculley, new chief of the Army Dental Corps. Finally, on May 1, 2002, President George W. Bush presented Salomon's Medal of Honor to Dr. West. West then presented the Medal to Sculley for permanent placement in the Army Medical Department Museum in San Antonio, Texas. A replica of Salomon's Medal of Honor is displayed at the USC Dental School. The Army Medical Department, at this point, was supportive.

== Medal of Honor citation ==
CAPTAIN BEN L. SALOMON
UNITED STATES ARMY

For conspicuous gallantry and intrepidity at the risk of his life above and beyond the call of duty:

Captain Ben L. Salomon was serving at Saipan, in the Marianas Islands on July 7, 1944, as the Surgeon for the 2nd Battalion, 105th Infantry Regiment, 27th Infantry Division. The Regiment’s 1st and 2d Battalions were attacked by an overwhelming force estimated between 3,000 and 5,000 Japanese soldiers. It was one of the largest attacks attempted in the Pacific Theater during World War II. Although both units fought furiously, the enemy soon penetrated the Battalions’ combined perimeter and inflicted overwhelming casualties. In the first minutes of the attack, approximately 30 wounded soldiers walked, crawled, or were carried into Captain Salomon’s aid station, and the small tent soon filled with wounded men. As the perimeter began to be overrun, it became increasingly difficult for Captain Salomon to work on the wounded. He then saw a Japanese soldier bayoneting one of the wounded soldiers lying near the tent. Firing from a squatting position, Captain Salomon quickly killed the enemy soldier. Then, as he turned his attention back to the wounded, two more Japanese soldiers appeared in the front entrance of the tent. As these enemy soldiers were killed, four more crawled under the tent walls. Rushing them, Captain Salomon kicked the knife out of the hand of one, shot another, and bayoneted a third. Captain Salomon butted the fourth enemy soldier in the stomach and a wounded comrade then shot and killed the enemy soldier. Realizing the gravity of the situation, Captain Salomon ordered the wounded to make their way as best they could back to the regimental aid station, while he attempted to hold off the enemy until they were clear. Captain Salomon then grabbed a rifle from one of the wounded and rushed out of the tent. After four men were killed while manning a machine gun, Captain Salomon took control of it. When his body was later found, 98 dead enemy soldiers were piled in front of his position. Captain Salomon’s extraordinary heroism and devotion to duty are in keeping with the highest traditions of military service and reflect great credit upon himself, his unit, and the United States Army.

== Awards ==

Badge	Combat Medical Badge Retroactively Awarded, 1945		
1st row	Medal of Honor		
2nd row	Bronze Star Medal Retroactively Awarded, 1947	Purple Heart	American Defense Service Medal
3rd row	American Campaign Medal	Asiatic-Pacific Campaign Medal with 1 Campaign star	World War II Victory Medal
Unit awards	Presidential Unit Citation		

27th Infantry Division Insignia

== Namesake ==
The US Army Dental Corps Dental Clinic on Fort Moore (Georgia) was named for Captain Salomon, which is called the Salomon Dental Clinic.

== See also ==
- List of Medal of Honor recipients
- List of Jewish Medal of Honor recipients
- List of Medal of Honor recipients for World War II
