= Order of the Yugoslav Crown =

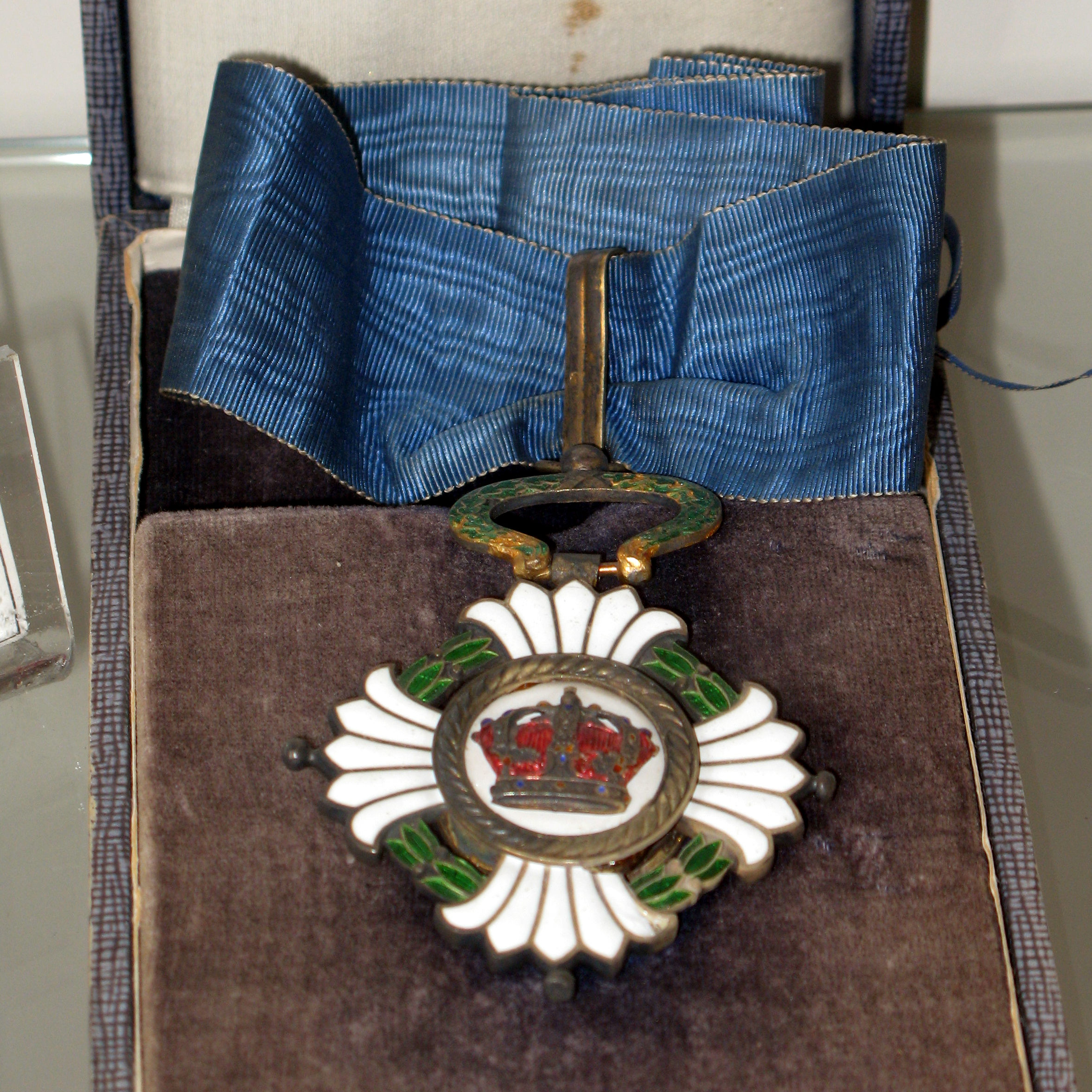
- Order of The Yugoslav Crown, 3rd class
- Type: State Order (1930–1945); House Order (after 1945)
- Awarded for: National unity and cooperation, or for merit towards the Crown, State and Nation in public service, as well as to the foreign nationals for diplomatic merit.
- Presented by: Kingdom of Yugoslavia
- Eligibility: Yugoslavian citizens and foreign nationals.
- Status: Discontinued
- Established: 5 April 1930
- First award: 6 September 1930

Highlights
- Total: Unknown
- Ribbon bar of the order

Precedence
- Next (higher): Order of the White Eagle
- Equivalent: Order of St. Sava

The Order of the Yugoslav Crown was instituted by King Alexander I of Yugoslavia on 5 April 1930, to commemorate his changing of the name of the Kingdom of the Serbs, Croats and Slovenes to the Kingdom of Yugoslavia.

It continues as a dynastic order, with appointments currently made by Alexander, Crown Prince of Yugoslavia.

== History ==
King Alexander ascended the Throne in 1921. During a political crisis in 1929 the strong separatist movements within the country forced the King to temporarily suspend the Constitution to declare a dictatorship and to place greater emphasis on national unity, which resulted in the name of the country to Yugoslavia. The order was awarded to Yugoslavian citizens who enhanced national unity or for merit towards the Crown or State in public service, as well as to the foreign nationals who had assisted the country. The Order of the Yugoslav Crown was senior to Order of St. Sava.

== Description ==
Insignia of the Order were made by the French firm Artis Bertrand and Swiss firm Huguenin. The Order of Yugoslav Crown five degrees' insignia are suspended from a ribbon of dark blue moire. The center of the cross contains the image of the Yugoslav royal crown and is part of the decoration of all degrees of the order. On the reverse side of the insignia is engraved the date "3-X-1929 and the royal monogram "A" (for 3 October 1929 and Alexander). The First and Second classes of the order also wear the star of the Order on the left side of his chest. The third, fourth, and fifth classes only wear the insignia of the Order. The First class of the order is worn on a blue moire riband over his right shoulder. The Second and Third class of the Order worn on a blue moire neck ribbon. The Fourth and Fifth class of the Order worn on a triangular blue moire ribbon on the left breast.

== Recipients ==
- Prince Tomislav of Yugoslavia
- Prince Paul of Yugoslavia
- Alexander, Crown Prince of Yugoslavia
- Peter II of Yugoslavia
- Prince Alexander of Yugoslavia
- Petar Bojović (1930)
- Prince Andrew of Yugoslavia
- Viktor Alexander
- Nikola Tesla (1931)
- Artur Phleps (1933)
- Josipina Eleonora Hudovernik (1937)
- Walther von Brauchitsch (1939)
- Fedor von Bock (1939)
- Louis Cukela
- Dominik Mandić
- Milutin Milanković
- Sepp Janko
- Stewart Menzies
- Geoffrey Fisher
