= Louis Cukela =

American Medal of Honor recipient (1888–1956)

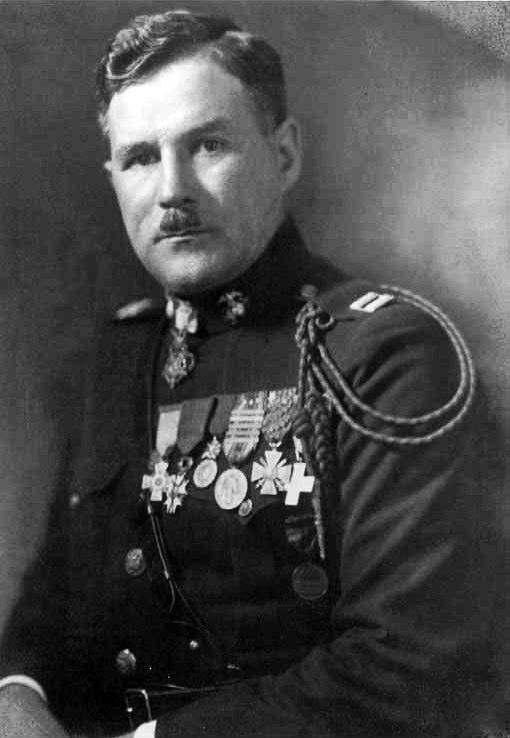
- Louis Cukela, c. 1921–1930
- Born: May 1, 1888; Split, Kingdom of Dalmatia, Austria-Hungary
- Died: March 19, 1956 (aged 67); Bethesda, Maryland, U.S.
- Burial place: Arlington National Cemetery
- Military career
- Allegiance: United States of America
- Branch: United States Army; United States Marine Corps
- Service years: 1914–1916 (US Army); 1917–1946 (USMC)
- Rank: Corporal (Army); Major (Marine Corps)
- Units: 5th Marines
- Conflicts: World War I: Battle of Belleau Wood; Battle of Soissons (1918); Meuse-Argonne Offensive; World War II
- Awards: Medal of Honor (2); Silver Star (3); Légion d'honneur (Chevalier); Order of the Yugoslav Crown (Cmdr.); Médaille militaire Croix de guerre (2 palms, silver star); Croce al Merito di Guerra

Louis Cukela (May 1, 1888 – March 19, 1956) was a Croatian American United States Marine numbered among the nineteen two-time recipients of the Medal of Honor. Cukela was awarded the Medal by both the United States Army and the United States Navy for the same action during the Battle of Soissons in World War I. He was also awarded decorations from France, Italy, and Kingdom of Yugoslavia.

== Biography ==
Vjekoslav Cukela was born on May 1, 1888, in the Dalmatian city of Split, today's Croatia (at the time Kingdom of Dalmatia, Austro-Hungarian Empire). His family soon moved from Split to Šibenik. (Note: A USMC History Division biography says he had been born in Šibenik.) His parents were Đuro Cukela, from the village of Koljane near Vrlika, and Ivanica (née Bubrić) from Kaštel Lukšić, and he was the oldest of four siblings, having three sisters. His mother died in 1900. He was educated in the grade schools of Split, then attended the Merchant Academy and later, the Royal Gymnasium, both for two year courses. Between 1907 and 1911 he served in the Austro-Hungarian Army.

In 1911, Cukela emigrated to the United States. He settled in Minneapolis, Minnesota. On September 21, 1914, he enlisted in the United States Army. He was serving as a corporal in Company H, 13th Infantry Regiment in the Philippines. He was honorably discharged on June 12, 1916.

In a 1931 Politika interview with Berislav Angjelinović, Cukela said he had heard that his father back home had been imprisoned by the Austrian authorities at the start of World War I. Believing that the Marine Corps would be deployed to Europe sooner than the Army, he paid 175 dollars to be discharged so he could transfer.

=== World War I ===
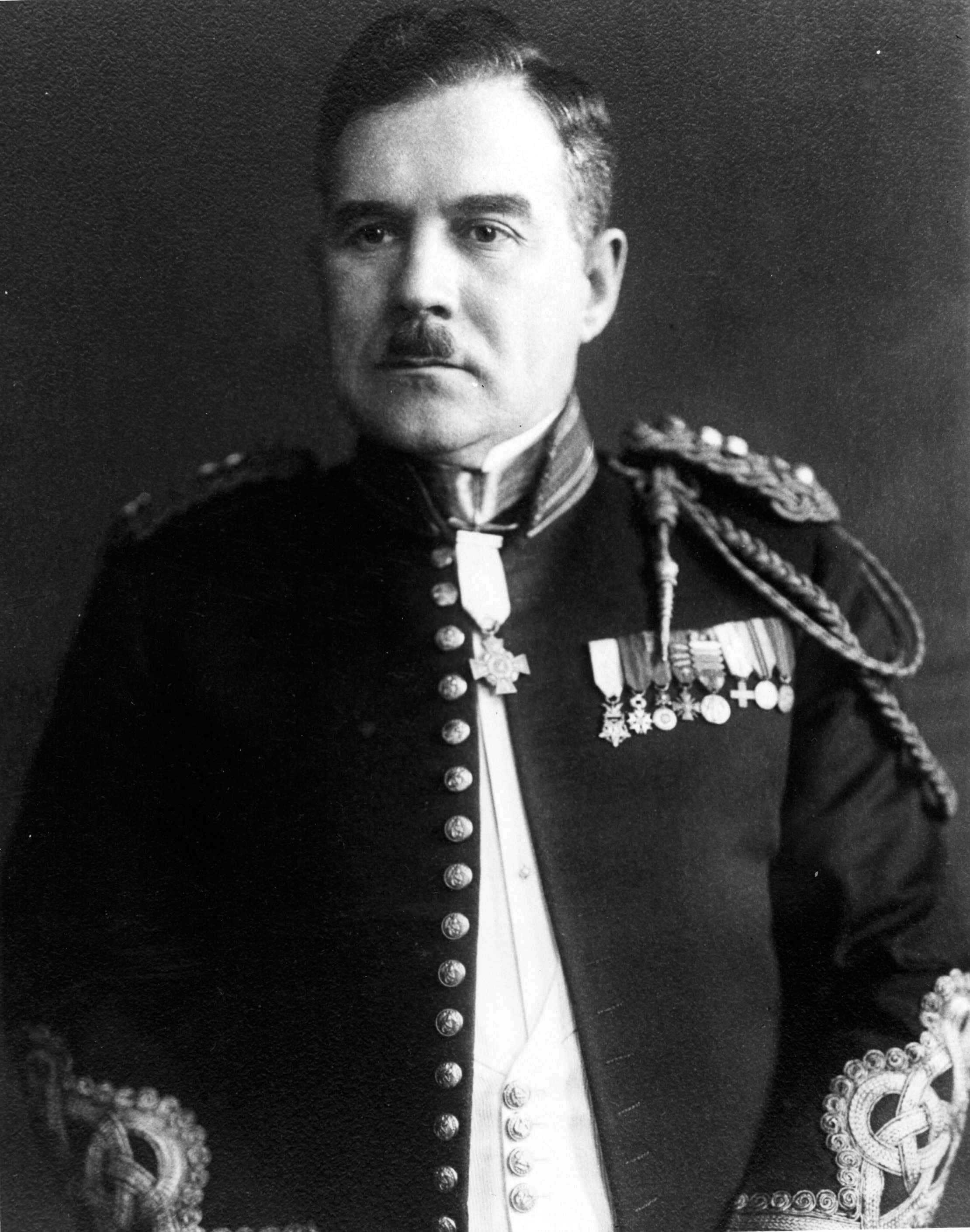
Captain Cukela with the Tiffany Cross Medal of Honor at his neck and the Army Medal of Honor in miniature on his chest.

Seven months after his discharge, on January 31, 1917, prior to the United States entry into World War I, Cukela enlisted in the United States Marine Corps. He became a member of the 66th Company, 1st Battalion, Fifth Marine Regiment.

He was deployed to France in 1918 and fought in all the engagements in which the 5th Marines participated, from Belleau Wood to the Meuse River Crossing. Along the way he earned a commission as a second lieutenant, as well as the Medal of Honor and four Silver Star citations. From the French, there was the Légion d'honneur, the Médaille militaire (the first award of this prestigious decoration to a Marine officer) and the Croix de guerre 1914–18 with two palms and one silver star. Italy decorated him with the Croce al Merito di Guerra, while Yugoslavia weighed in with the Commander's Cross of the Royal Order of the Crown of Yugoslavia.

He was awarded the Medal of Honor by both the Army and the Navy (in the "Tiffany Cross" pattern) for the same action on the morning of July 18, 1918, near Villers-Cotterêts, France, during the Soissons engagement. The 66th Company, 5th Marines, in which Cukela was then a gunnery sergeant, was advancing through the Forest de Retz when it was held up by an enemy strong point. Despite the warnings of his men, the gunnery sergeant crawled out from the flank and advanced alone towards the German lines. Getting beyond the strong point despite heavy fire, "Gunny" Cukela captured one gun by bayoneting its crew. Picking up their hand grenades, he then demolished the remaining portion of the strong point from the shelter of a nearby gun pit. He took four prisoners and captured two undamaged machine guns.

Cukela was wounded in action twice but since there is no record of either wound at the Navy's Bureau of Medicine and Surgery, he was never awarded the Purple Heart. The first wound was suffered at Jaulny, France, on September 16, 1918, during the St. Mihiel engagement. Cukela was wounded again during the fighting in the Champagne sector. Neither wound was serious.

In addition to the two Medals of Honor, Cukela was awarded the Silver Star by the Army; the Médaille militaire (he was the first Marine officer ever to receive this medal), the Legion of Honour in the rank of Chevalier, the Croix de guerre with two palms, another Croix de guerre with Silver Star, all by France; the Croce al Merito di Guerra by Italy; and Commander's Cross of the Royal Order of the Crown of Yugoslavia. He also received three Second Division citations. Cukela received a field appointment to the rank of second lieutenant in the Marine Corps Reserve on September 26, 1918, and was selected for a commission in the regular Marine Corps on March 31, 1919. Promoted to first lieutenant on July 17, 1919, he was advanced to the rank of captain on September 15, 1921. His promotion to major was effected on the day of his retirement, June 30, 1940.

=== After World War I ===
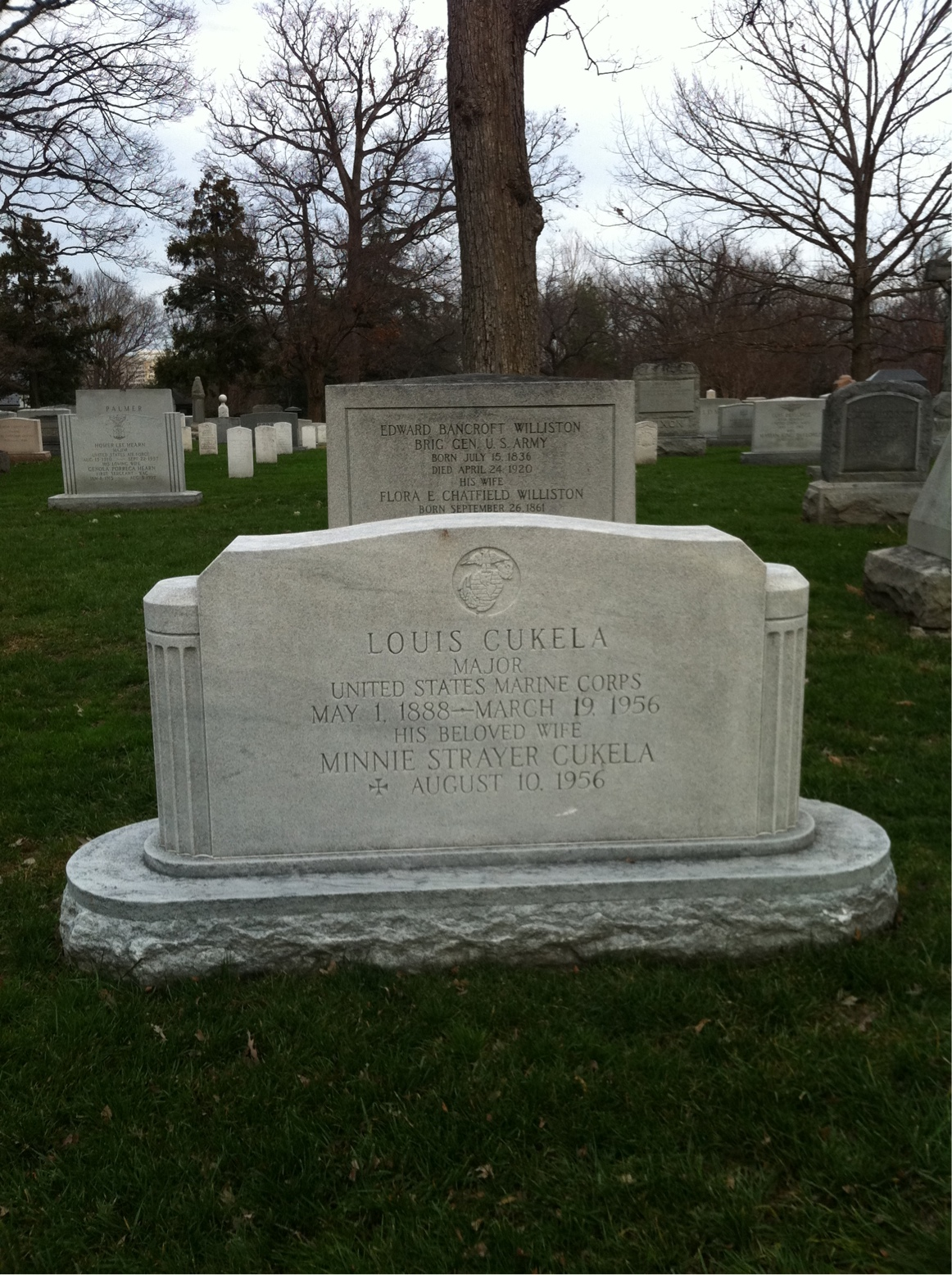

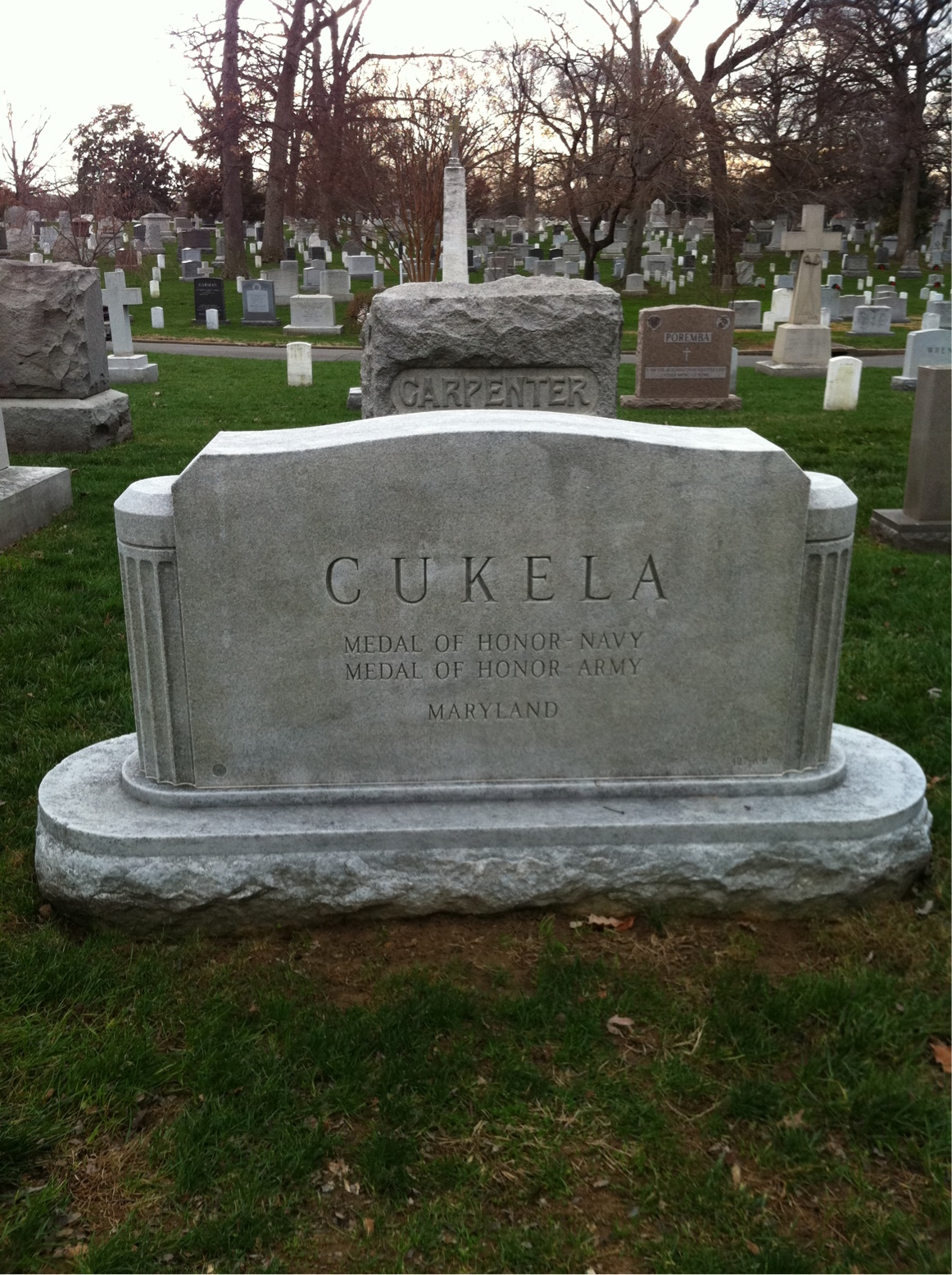
Grave at Arlington National Cemetery

After the war, Cukela served at overseas bases in Haiti, Santo Domingo, the Philippines, and Tianjin, China, and at domestic stations in Quantico, Virginia; Philadelphia, Pennsylvania; Norfolk, Virginia; Hampton Roads, Virginia; Mare Island, California; Washington, D.C.; Nashville, Indiana, and Fort Knox, Kentucky.

Cukela served as a second lieutenant of United States Marine Corps stationed at Maissade, Republic of Haiti in the times of the Second Caco War of 1919–1920. By 1919, Haitian Charlemagne Péralte had organized more than a thousand armed guerrillas (called cacos), to militarily oppose the United States Marine occupation. The Marines responded to the resistance with a counterinsurgency campaign that razed villages, killed thousands of Haitians, and destroyed the livelihoods of even more. Cukela was one of the US military personnel questioned by a US Senate committee for the atrocities he committed and abuse of power. Cukela executed a group of prisoners in the middle of a Marine camp there. For this atrocity he was not court martialed rather transferred to another camp.

General Barnett, Marine Corps Commandant in 1920 set up a board headed by Colonel John H. Russell Jr. to decide which wartime temporary officers would be retired, demoted, or discharged. Educated men of good family were preferred over formerly enlisted men with little formal education. As a consequence of those criteria Cukela was demoted from first lieutenant to second lieutenant despite his wartime heroism.

By 1927 Cukela was a captain of the 75th Company of Marines serving in Tianjin, China.

From June 1933 to January 1934, Cukela served as a company commander with the Civilian Conservation Corps. His last years in the Marine Corps were spent at Norfolk, where he served as the post quartermaster. Retired as a major on June 30, 1940, he was recalled to active duty on July 30, of the same year.

During World War II the major served at Norfolk and Philadelphia.

=== Retirement and death ===
Cukela finally returned to the inactive retired list on May 17, 1946. Cukela served a few days less than 32 years of active duty in the army and Marines.

On March 19, 1956, he died at the U.S. Naval Hospital, Bethesda, Maryland. Following services at St. Jane Frances de Chantel Church, Bethesda, he was buried at Arlington National Cemetery.

== Legacy ==
He was famous for his broken English, best exemplified by his unforgettable saying, "If I want[ed] to send a goddamned fool, I'd go myself" (when a messenger came back with a stupid garbled reply).

Cukela was profiled in the August 2018 issue of Naval History magazine.

== Decorations ==
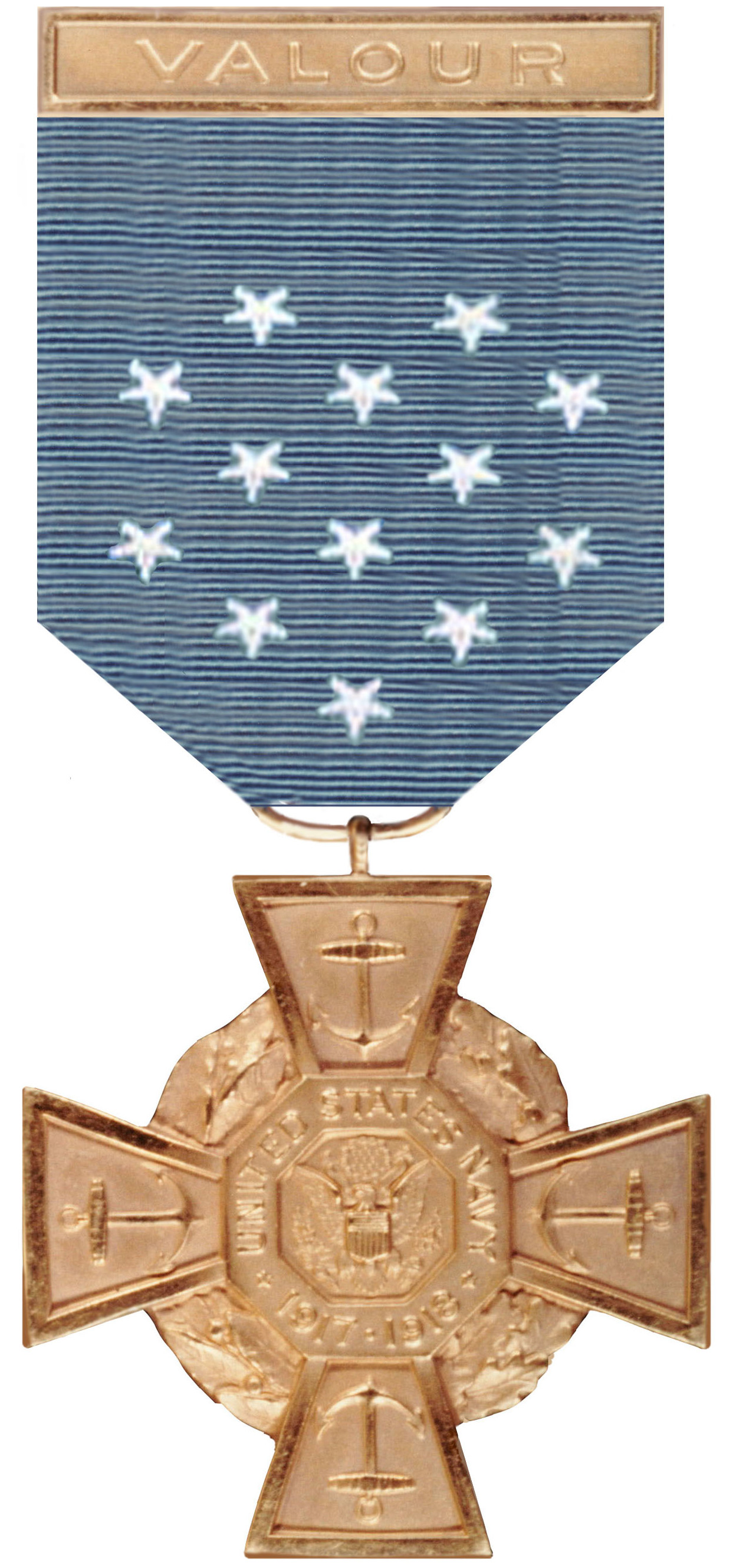
Navy's Tiffany Cross Medal of Honor

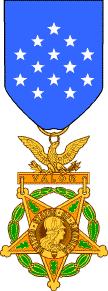
Army Medal of Honor

Major Cukela had the following decorations and medals:

- Medal of Honor (Navy)
- Medal of Honor (Army)
- Silver Star
- World War I Victory Medal with Aisne, Aisne-Marne, St. Mihiel, Meuse-Argonne, and Defensive Sector clasps and three silver stars
- Haitian Campaign Medal
- Marine Corps Expeditionary Medal with one star
- Yangtze Service Medal
- American Defense Service Medal
- American Campaign Medal
- World War II Victory Medal
- Médaille militaire
- Légion d'honneur (Chevalier)
- Croix de guerre with two palms and silver star;
- Croce al Merito di Guerra
- Commander's Cross of the Royal Order of the Crown of Yugoslavia
- French Fourragère

=== Medal of Honor citations ===
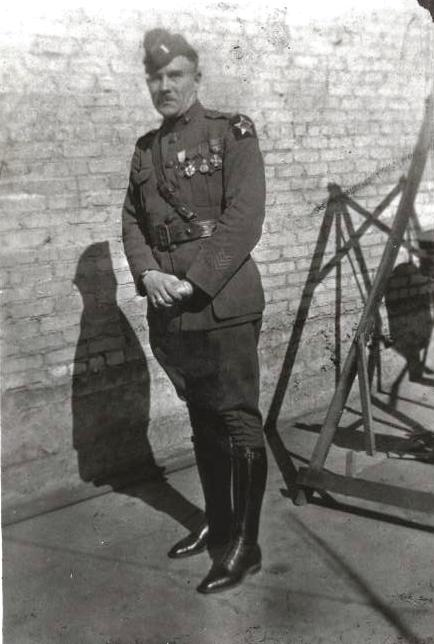
Cukela after his return to the U.S. from France

Navy citation:

For extraordinary heroism while serving with the 66th Company, 5th Regiment, during action in Forest de Retz, near Viller-Cottertes, France, 18 July 1918. Sgt. Cukela advanced alone against an enemy strong point that was holding up his line. Disregarding the warnings of his comrades, he crawled out from the flank in the face of heavy fire and worked his way to the rear of the enemy position. Rushing a machine-gun emplacement, he killed or drove off the crew with his bayonet, bombed out the remaining part of the strong point with German hand grenades, and captured two machineguns and four men.

Army citation:

When his company, advancing through a wood, met with strong resistance from an enemy strong point, Sgt. Cukela crawled out from the flank and made his way toward the German lines in the face of heavy fire, disregarding the warnings of his comrades. He succeeded in getting behind the enemy position and rushed a machinegun emplacement, killing or driving off the crew with his bayonet. With German hand grenades he then bombed out the remaining portion of the strong point, capturing 4 men and 2 damaged machineguns.

== Personal life ==
Cukela visited his childhood home of Šibenik in 1925, publicly displaying his many decorations. He also visited Yugoslavia in 1931 for a congress of expatriates that toured several major cities, and he was also granted an audience with King Alexander. In 1938, he learned of the Yugoslav training ship Jadran visiting Boston, so he went out there to greet them as well.

In 1952, a Yugoslav military delegation visited the United States, and a colonel who was a cousin of Cukela's visited him in his home in Bethesda, where Major Cukela had also had an old gusle on display.

Cukela was married to Minnie Myrtle Strayer of Mifflintown, Pennsylvania, on December 22, 1923, in Washington, D.C. Mrs. Cukela died on August 10, 1956, just months after Major Cukela. At the time of his death, Major Cukela was also survived by a sister, Mrs. Zorka Cukela Dvoracek, of Šibenik, Croatia.

== See also ==
- List of Medal of Honor recipients
- List of Medal of Honor recipients for World War I
- List of historic United States Marines
