= Josipina Eleonora Hudovernik =

Slovenian composer, music educator and headmistress (1863–1945)

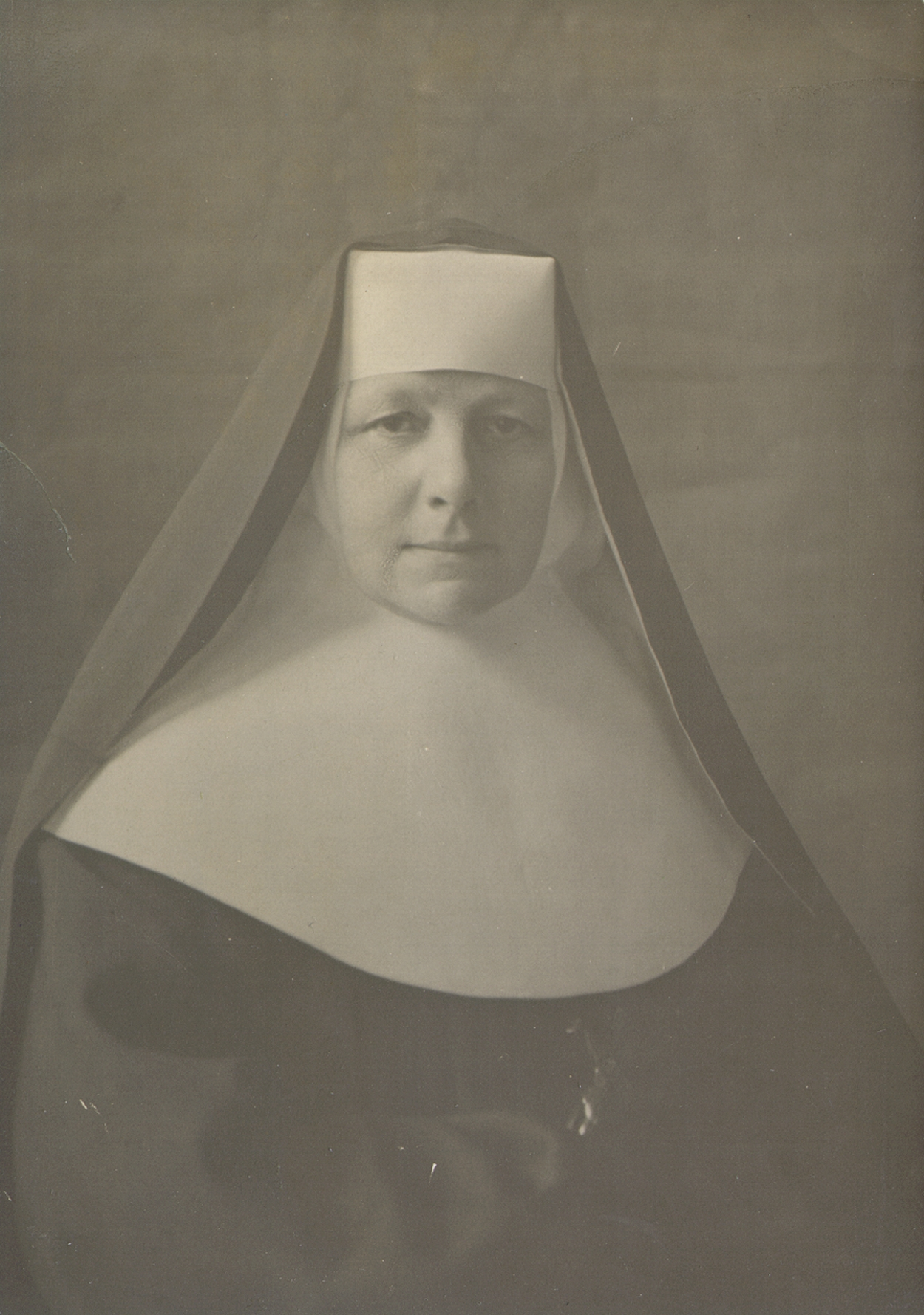
- Born: Josipina Hudovernik; March 25, 1863; Radovljica
- Died: March 1, 1945 (aged 81); Ljubljana
- Occupations: music teacher, headmistress, composer
- Notable work: "Dete rajsko, Dete sveto" (Heavenly Child, Holy Child)

Josipina Hudovernik, sister Marija Eleonora, (March 25, 1863 – March 1, 1945) was a Slovenian music teacher, headmistress and composer. She wrote and composed the popular Slovenian Christmas carol "Dete rajsko, Dete sveto" (Heavenly Child, Holy Child).

== Early life ==
Josipina Eleonora was born on March 25, 1863 in Radovljica into a religious Slovene family.Her mother was an innkeeper, Lucija Oman, and her father was an innkeeper and merchant, Jernej Hudovernik (1816–1893). She attended school in Radovljica and the then 8th grade school and a private teacher training school with the Ursulines in Ljubljana. She entered the Ursuline order in 1881. In 1891 she passed the qualifying exam for teacher in elementary school. The following year she passed the qualifying exam for teacher in middle-class school. She later studied French and Italian.

== Career ==
She studied music privately, piano with conservatory teacher Valentine Karinger and organ with Anton Foerster. She later studied singing with Berta de Pop-Stockert. She passed the special examination in singing, piano and organ with distinction in 1893. Due to her talent, she soon became a recognized organist and composer. She first worked as a music teacher at a school for girls, and later was its headmistress between 1903 and 1923, when she retired. She is credited with over 120 choral compositions, mostly written for the monastery choir and for the girls' school. She died on March 1, 1945, in Ljubljana.

== Awards ==
In 1937 she received an award for her artistic work: the Order of the Yugoslav Crown, Fifth Class.

== Legacy ==
Her Christmas carol "Dete rajsko, Dete sveto" (Heavenly Child, Holy Child) is one of most popular Slovene Christmas carols.
