= Weedon Osborne =

United States Navy dentist, Medal of Honor recipient (1892–1918)

Weedon Edward Osborne
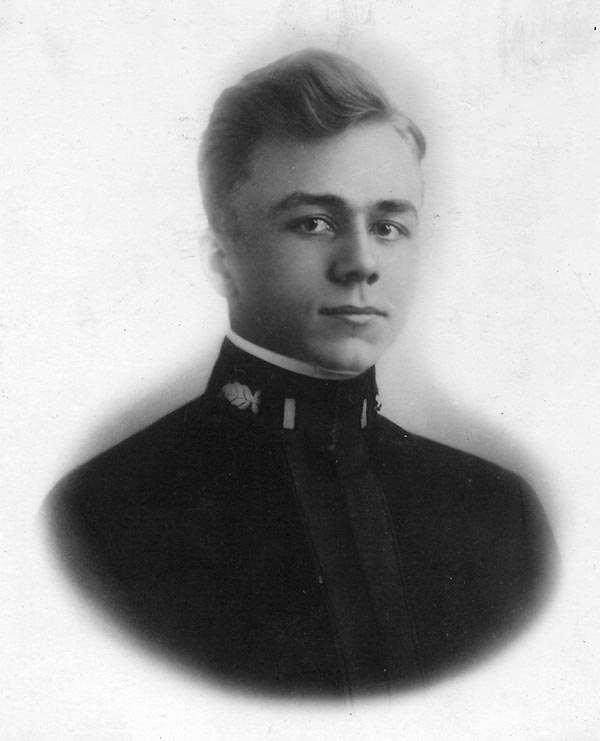
- Lieutenant, Junior Grade, Weedon Osborne
- Born: November 13, 1892; Chicago, Illinois
- Died: June 6, 1918 (aged 25) near Bouresches, France
- Burial place: Aisne-Marne American Cemetery, Belleau, Aisne, France
- Military career
- Allegiance: United States of America
- Branch: United States Navy
- Service years: 1917–1918
- Rank: Lieutenant, Junior Grade
- Units: Navy Dental Corps; 6th Marine Regiment
- Conflicts: World War I; Battle of Belleau Wood †
- Awards: Medal of Honor; Distinguished Service Cross; War Cross (Italy)

Weedon Edward Osborne (November 13, 1892 – June 6, 1918) was a United States Navy officer and a recipient of America's highest military decoration—the Medal of Honor—for his actions in World War I. He is one of only three dental officers to have received the medal, the others being Alexander Gordon Lyle and Ben L. Salomon.

== Biography ==
A Chicago native, Weedon Osborne graduated from Northwestern University Dental School in 1915. He was appointed a U.S. Navy Dental Surgeon with the rank of Lieutenant, Junior Grade, on May 8, 1917. He was assigned duty with the 6th Marine Regiment on March 26, 1918. During the Battle of Belleau Wood, Osborne's unit participated in the advance on Bouresches, France, about a mile southeast of Belleau Wood. Osborne sought to aid the wounded during the battle and was killed while attempting to carry an injured officer to safety on June 6, 1918. He was posthumously awarded the Medal of Honor and the Distinguished Service Cross for his actions on that day.

Weedon Osborne was 25 years old at the time of his death. He was buried in Aisne-Marne American Cemetery, Belleau, Aisne, France.

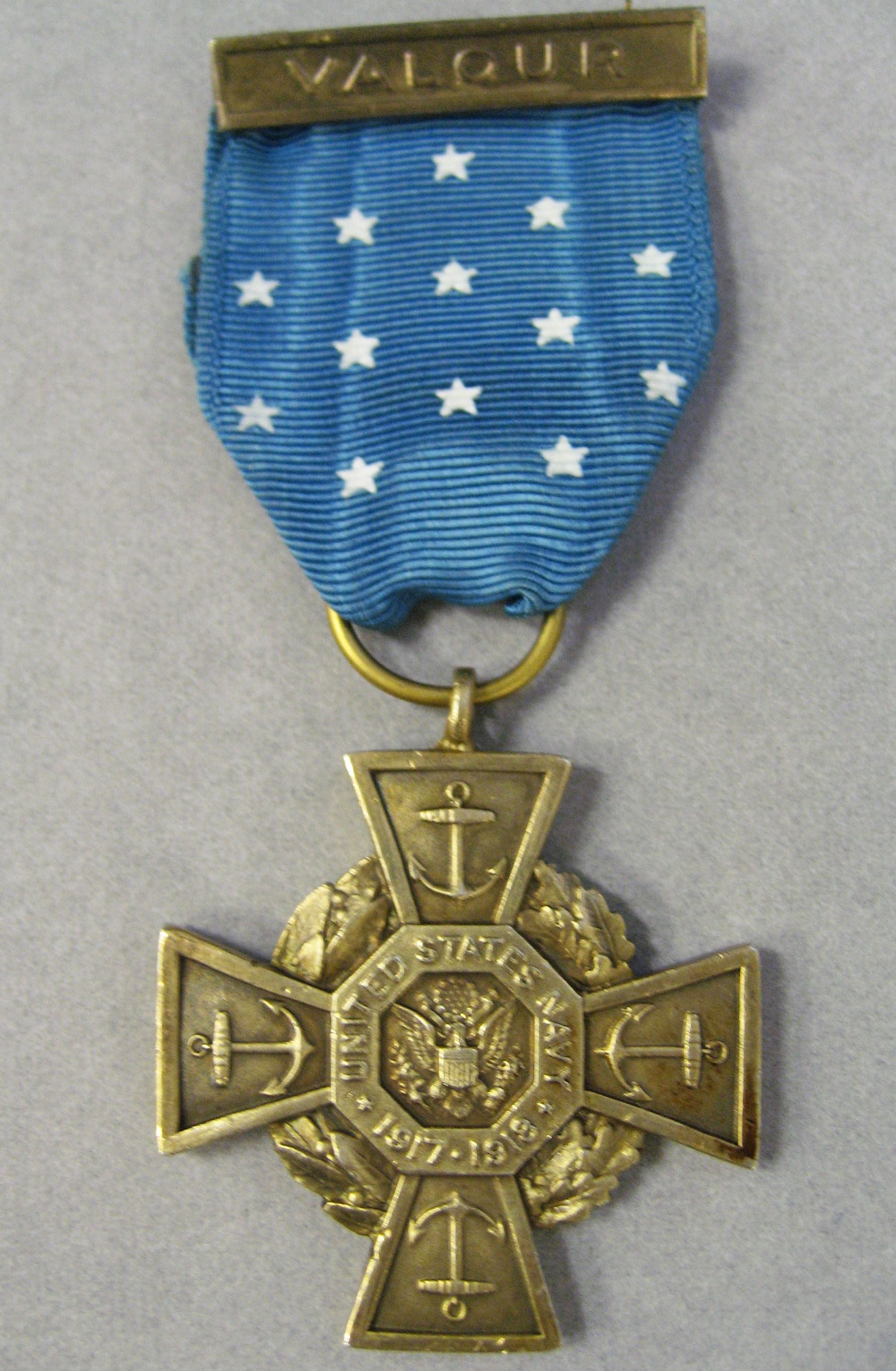
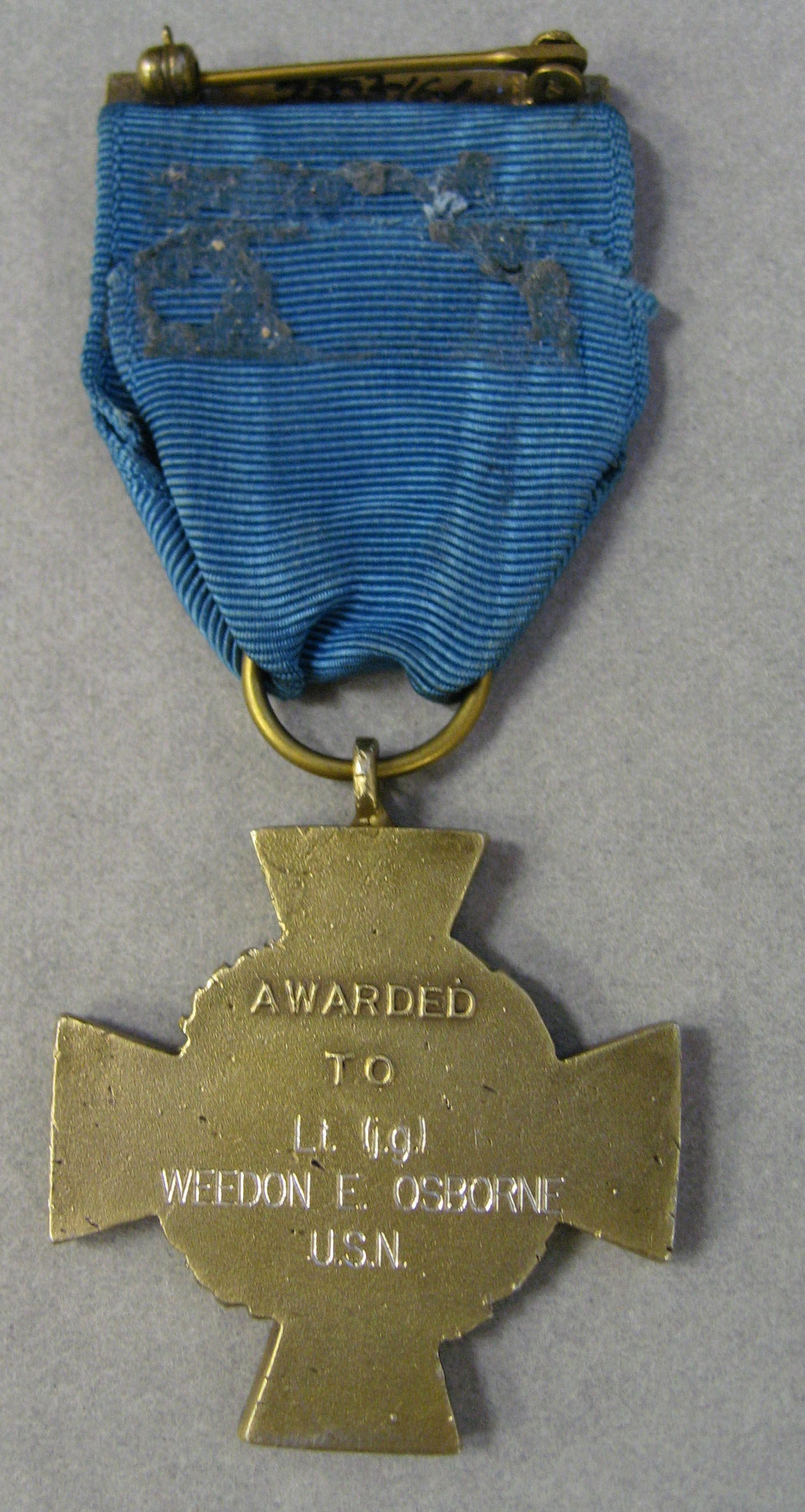
Osborne's Medal of Honor, front and back

Osborne's Medal of Honor, a rare "Tiffany Cross" version, is held by the U.S. Navy Museum in Washington, D.C. The museum acquired the medal in 2003 from the Federal Bureau of Investigation, which had confiscated it the year before after someone had attempted to sell the medal in South Carolina. It is illegal to sell a Medal of Honor within the United States.

== Medal of Honor citation ==
Rank and organization: Lieutenant, Junior Grade, (Dental Corps), U.S. Navy. Born: 13 November 1892, Chicago, Ill. Appointed from: Illinois.

Citation

For conspicuous gallantry and intrepidity at the risk of his life above and beyond the call of duty while attached to the Sixth Regiment, United States Marines, in actual conflict with the enemy and under fire during the advance on Bouresche, France on 6 June 1918. In the hottest of the fighting when the Marines made their famous advance on Bouresche at the southern edge of Belleau Wood, Lieutenant (j.g.) Osborne threw himself zealously into the work of rescuing the wounded. Extremely courageous in the performance of this perilous task, he was killed while carrying a wounded officer to a place of safety. By his exceptional fortitude, inspiring initiative, and selfless devotion to duty, Lieutenant (j.g.) Osborne reflected great credit upon himself and upheld the highest traditions of the United States Naval Service. He gallantly gave his life for his country.

== Namesake ==
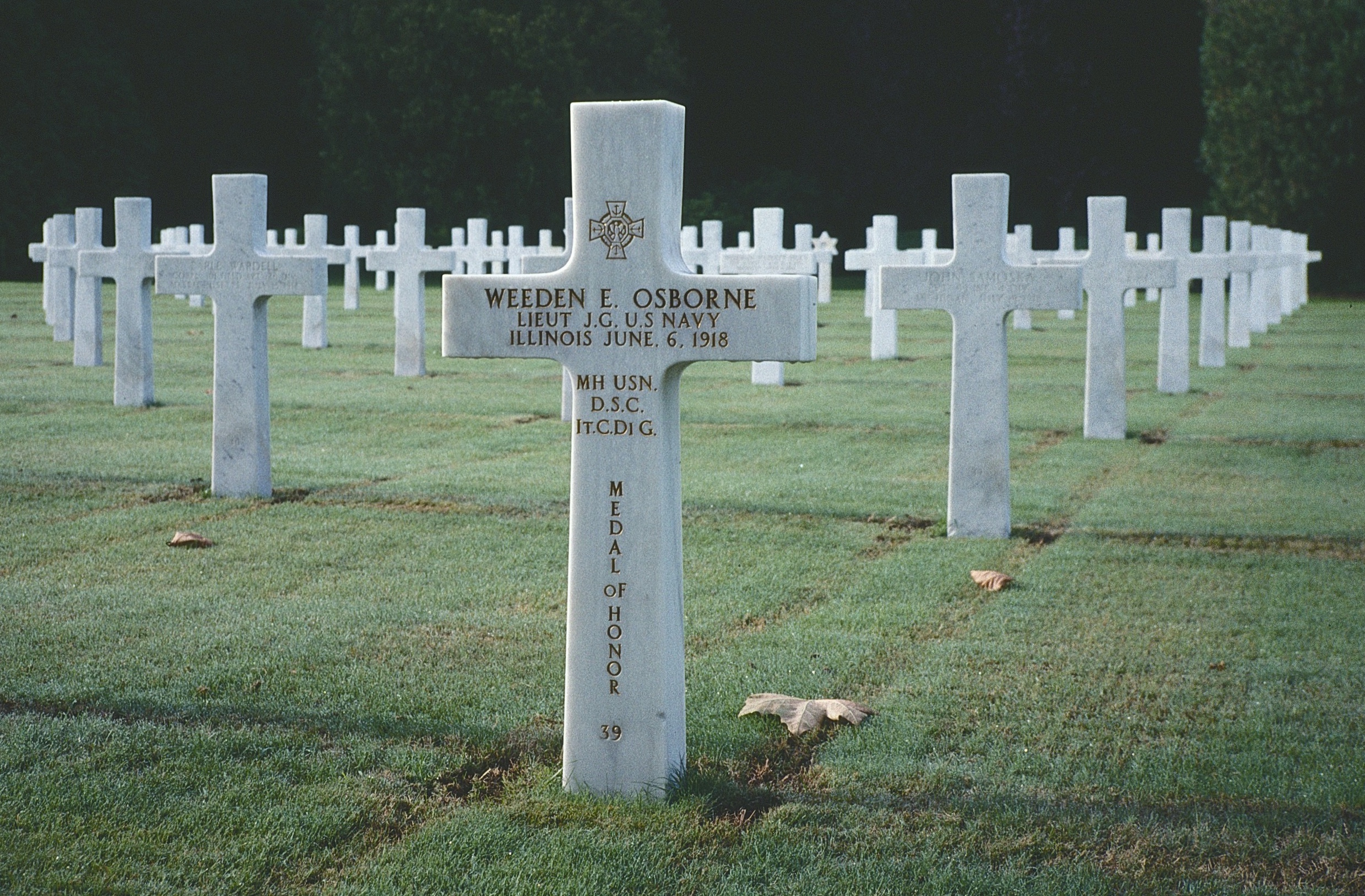
Osborne's grave

The destroyer USS Osborne (DD-295), which served during the 1920s, was named for Lieutenant Osborne.

The USS Osborne Dental Clinic, one of four Branch Dental Clinics within the Captain James A. Lovell Federal Health Care Center in North Chicago, Illinois, is named in honor of Lieutenant, Junior Grade Osborne.

== See also ==
- List of Medal of Honor recipients for World War I
