= Tiffany Cross Medal of Honor =

US Navy award for heroism (1917–1928)

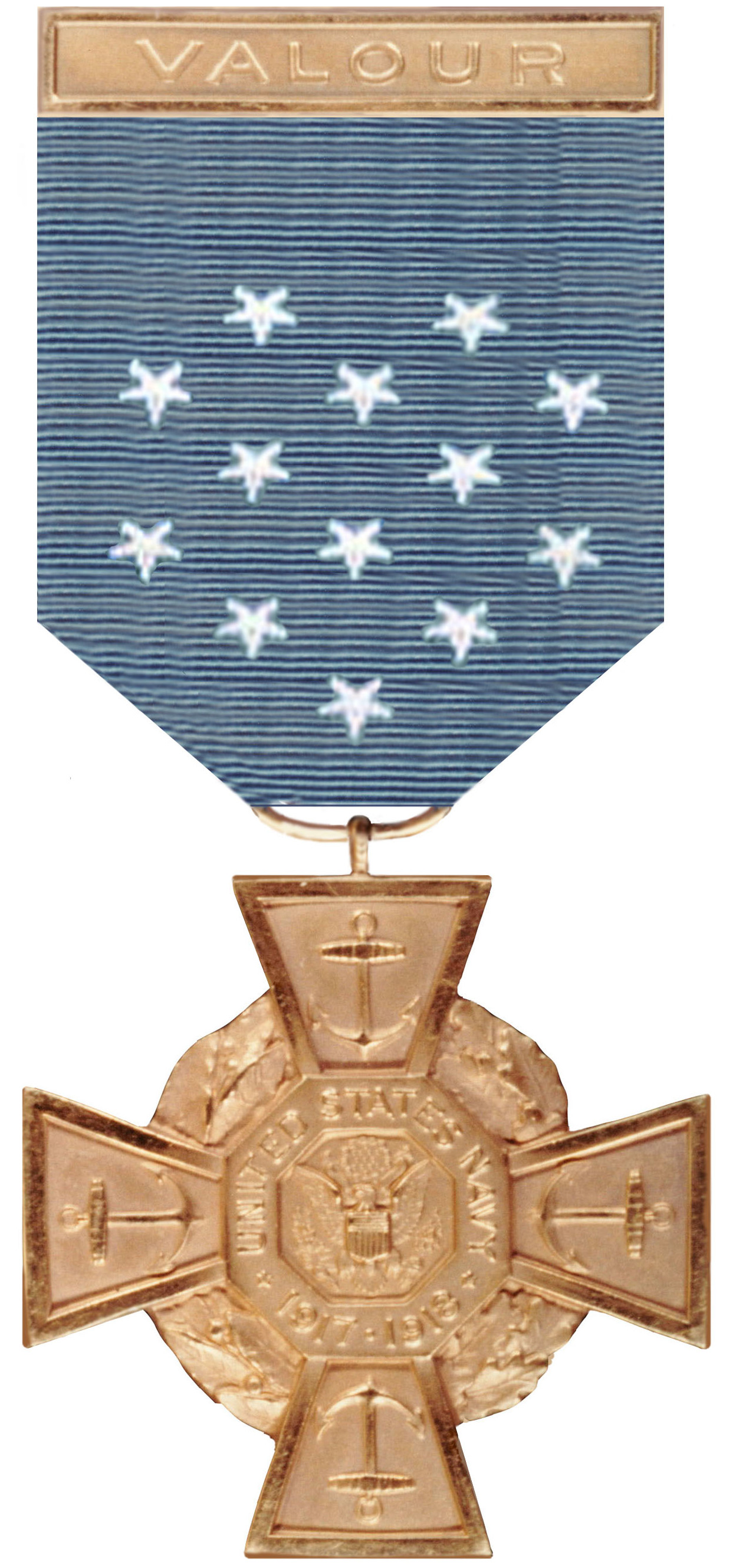
- 1919–1942 Navy "Tiffany Cross" pattern
- Type: Medal (Decoration)
- Awarded for: Gallantry and intrepidity in actual conflict at the risk of one's life above and beyond the call of duty
- Description: Modified cross pattée
- Presented by: the President of the United States in the name of Congress
- Eligibility: US Navy and Marine Corps personnel, 1917–1942
- Motto: VALOUR
- Status: Obsolete 7 August 1942
- Established: 4 February 1919 (retroactive to 6 April 1917)
- First award: 15 October 1917, World War I
- Final award: 8 January 1928, Nicaragua

Highlights
- Total: 22
- Total awarded posthumously: 5
- Total recipients: 22
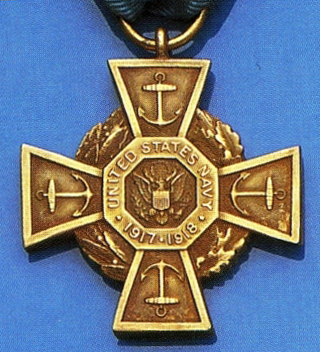
- Details of the Tiffany Cross

Precedence
- Equivalent: Medal of Honor
- Next (lower): Navy Distinguished Service Medal

The Tiffany Cross Medal of Honor arose immediately after World War I, as the U.S. Navy decided to recognize via the Medal of Honor two manners of heroism, one in combat and one in the line of a sailor's profession. The original upside-down star was designated as the non-combat version and a new pattern of the medal pendant, in cross form, was designed by the Tiffany Company in 1919. It was to be presented to a sailor or Marine who "in action involving actual conflict with the enemy, distinguish[es] himself conspicuously by gallantry and intrepidity at the risk of his life above and beyond the call of duty and without detriment to his mission." This pendant became the Tiffany Cross.

== Description ==
The Tiffany Cross is suspended from the light blue Medal of Honor ribbon with 13 white stars. At the ribbon top is a bar with the word "VALOUR". The medal is a gold cross pattée overlaying an oak and laurel wreath on the obverse side, with an antique anchor in each arm of the cross. The center, overlaying the cross, is an octagon with the phrases "UNITED STATES NAVY" to the top and "1917·1918" to the bottom, on the perimeter separated by two stars. The center of the octagon is the Great Seal of the United States. The reverse side is flat, suitable for engraving. Awardees' medals often had intricate inscriptions.

== Authorization ==
On 4 February 1919, in the same act that created the Navy Cross and the Navy Distinguished Service Medal, Congress provided:

That the President of the United States be, and is hereby authorized to present in the name of Congress, a Medal of Honor to any person who, while in the naval service of the United States, shall, in action involving actual conflict with the enemy, distinguish himself conspicuously by gallantry and intrepidity at the risk of his life above and beyond the call of duty and without detriment to the mission of his command or the command to which attached.

Designed by Tiffany Company, this medal became the Tiffany Cross and eligibility was retroactive to 6 April 1917, when the United States entered World War I.

== Inconsistent presentations ==
Despite the "actual conflict" guidelines, the Tiffany Cross was awarded to Floyd Bennett and Richard Byrd for arctic exploration, and to John Siegel for a rescue at sea. In the words of the Congressional Medal of Honor Society, the Tiffany Cross Program was "poorly regulated and documented."

== Unpopularity and deauthorization ==
The Tiffany Cross was unpopular, perhaps because it so closely resembled the German Iron Cross. Recipients, such as Richard E. Byrd, requested, received, and wore the classical inverted star design. Byrd received his Tiffany Cross on 27 February 1927 from President Coolidge. He received his classical Medal of Honor on 20 June 1930 from President Hoover. His motives for the change are not recorded. In 1942, the Navy returned to using only the original 1862 inverted 5-point star design, and ceased issuing the award for non-combat action.

== Next lower award ==
During the Tiffany Cross's active status, the next lower naval award was the Navy Distinguished Service Medal, followed by the Navy Cross. By congressional action on 7 August 1942, in the same act that terminated the Tiffany Cross, the Distinguished Service Medal and the Navy Cross swapped places, with the Navy Cross also becoming solely a combat award.

== Recipients ==
The US Naval History & Heritage Command asserts that 28 sailors and Marines received the Tiffany Cross, but does not provide a list. The Navy's assertion of 28 recipients is believed to be derived from the fact that 21 Sailors and 7 Marines were awarded the Medal of Honor for actions during World War I. However, a review of:

- presentation photographs to Medal of Honor recipients,
- photographs or paintings of recipients wearing a Tiffany Cross,
- photographs of engravings on the medal's reverse side (many on the Naval History website),
- museum displays of recipient medals,
- recipient headstone markers,
- newspaper accounts of the presentation ceremony and
- application of the "actual conflict" criterion

make a nearly complete list of 22 recipients. Based on analysis of all recipients of the Navy version of the Medal of Honor from 1919 to 1942, these 22 recipients are believed to be the only individuals that received the Tiffany Cross version of the Medal of Honor. There are at least three recipients (Byrd, Bennett, Siegal) who were awarded the Tiffany Cross for non-combat actions. There may be other in-period recipients, but these are not known and would require similar investigation.

=== List ===
Lavender background and † indicates that the
Medal of Honor was awarded posthumously.

Image	Name	Service	Date of action	Combat	Action (Note: Unless otherwise indicated, all actions sourced from the US Army Center of Military History.)
	Osmond K. Ingram †	Navy	15 October 1917	Yes	Ingram was killed while attempting to release depth charges in the face of an oncoming torpedo. He is one of thirteen recipients receiving the Tiffany Cross from a single Department of the Navy announcement issued 11 November 1920, many of whom present photographic evidence. His action meets the "actual conflict" criterion. Osmond K. Ingram's Tiffany Cross medal, and other military decorations, are part of the collection of the Birmingham, AL Museum of Art.
	Alexander G. Lyle	Navy, Dental Corps	23 April 1918	Yes	Lyle exposed himself to hostile fire to treat a wounded man. He is one of thirteen recipients receiving the Tiffany Cross from a single Department of the Navy announcement issued 11 November 1920, many of whom present photographic evidence. He has a museum display, (Note: On display at the Walter Reed National Military Medical Center, Bethesda, MD.) and meets the "actual conflict" criterion. There is a photo of the recipient wearing his Tiffany Cross.
	Daniel A. J. Sullivan	Naval Reserve	21 May 1918	Yes	Sullivan secured a group of live depth charges. He is one of thirteen recipients receiving the Tiffany Cross from a single Department of the Navy announcement issued 11 November 1920, many of whom present photographic evidence. He meets the "actual conflict" criterion.
	Edouard V. M. Izac	Navy	21 May 1918	Yes	Izac gathered intelligence while a prisoner of war; he then escaped and brought the information to the Allies. There is a photograph of his medal's engraving. (Note: One of the 13 recipients reported in the New York Times.)
	Ernest A. Janson	Marine Corps	6 June 1918	Yes (Note: Received both the Army and Navy versions of the Medal of Honor for the same action; one of nineteen people to receive two Medals of Honor.) (Note: Also served under the name Charles F. Hoffman.)	Janson single-handedly attacked and dispersed a machine gun detachment. He meets the "actual conflict" criterion. Janson also received the Army version of the Medal of Honor for the same action. There is a photograph of the recipient wearing his Tiffany Cross.
	Weedon E. Osborne †	Navy, Dental Corps	6 June 1918	Yes	Osborne was killed while rescuing wounded men from under heavy fire. There is a museum display of his medal. The Tiffany Cross medal recovered by the FBI is clearly a replica Tiffany Cross (the casting is poor quality and the engraving is the incorrect style).
	Orlando H. Petty	Naval Reserve, Medical Corps	11 June 1918	Yes	Petty tended the wounded despite artillery and gas attacks, even after his gas mask was rendered useless. There is a photograph of the recipient wearing his Tiffany Cross.
	Louis Cukela	Marine Corps	18 July 1918	Yes	Cukela single-handedly attacked and captured a German strongpoint. There is a photograph of the recipient wearing his Tiffany Cross.
	Matej Kocak †	Marine Corps	18 July 1918	Yes	Kocak single-handedly silenced a machine gun nest and led a successful attack on a second nest. He meets the "actual conflict" criterion.
	Joel T. Boone	Navy, Medical Corps	19 July 1918	Yes	Boone exposed himself to intense fire in order to treat the wounded and bring in supplies. There is a photograph of the recipient wearing his Tiffany Cross.
	Charles H. Hammann	Navy	21 August 1918	Yes	Hammann rescued a fellow pilot who had been shot down. He is one of thirteen recipients receiving the Tiffany Cross from a single Department of the Navy announcement issued 11 November 1920, many of whom present photographic evidence. He meets the "actual conflict" criterion.
	David E. Hayden	Navy	15 September 1918	Yes	Hayden reached a wounded man, treated him, and carried him to safety despite intense fire. He is one of thirteen recipients receiving the Tiffany Cross from a single Department of the Navy announcement issued 11 November 1920, many of whom present photographic evidence. There is a museum display of his medal, (Note: on display at the Legion of Valor Museum, Fresno, California.) and he meets the "actual conflict" criterion.
	John J. Kelly	Marine Corps	3 October 1918	Yes	Kelly single-handedly attacked a machine gun nest under an artillery barrage. There is a painting of the recipient wearing his Tiffany Cross, and there is a museum display of his medal. (Note: On display at the National Museum of the Marine Corps, Quantico, VA.)
	John H. Pruitt †	Marine Corps	3 October 1918	Yes	Pruitt single-handedly captured two machine guns and forty prisoners. There is a museum display of his medal, and he meets the "actual conflict" criterion.
	James J. Madison	Naval Reserve	4 October 1918	Yes	Madison continued to lead his ship after being severely wounded during a U-boat attack. There is a photograph of the recipient wearing his Tiffany Cross.
	John H. Balch	Naval Reserve	5 October 1918	Yes	Balch exposed himself to intense fire in order to treat the wounded and establish a dressing station. He is one of thirteen recipients receiving the Tiffany Cross from a single Department of the Navy announcement issued 11 November 1920, many of whom present photographic evidence. He has a museum display of his medal, (Note: On display at the Walter Reed National Military Medical Center, Bethesda, MD.) and he meets the "actual conflict" criterion.
	Robert G. Robinson	Marine Corps	14 October 1918	Yes	Robinson continued to fire his weapon after being severely wounded in an aerial battle against twelve German planes. There is a photograph of his medal's engraving, and museum display of the medal.
	Ralph Talbot †	Marine Corps	14 October 1918	Yes	Talbot, with gunner Robert G. Robinson, shot down one plane in an aerial battle against twelve German aircraft. He is one of thirteen recipients receiving the Tiffany Cross from a single Department of the Navy announcement issued 11 November 1920, many of whom present photographic evidence. There is a museum display of his medal, and he meets the "actual conflict" criterion.
—	John O. Siegel	Navy	1 November 1918	No	Seigel rescued two men from a burning vessel before being trapped and collapsing from the smoke. There is a museum display of his medal. (Note: Collection of the Natural History Museum of Los Angeles County, Los Angeles, CA.)
	Floyd Bennett	Navy	9 May 1926	No	Bennett's award is for his part in what was thought to be the first successful heavier-than-air flight to the North Pole and back. There is a photograph of the recipient receiving his medal.
	Richard E. Byrd	Navy	9 May 1926	No	Byrd's award is for leading what was thought to be the first successful heavier-than-air flight to the North Pole and back. There is a photograph of the recipient receiving his medal.
	Frank Schilt	Marine Corps	8 January 1928	Yes	Schilt evacuated wounded Marines by plane while under fire. There is a photograph of the recipient wearing his medal.

== See also ==
- List of Medal of Honor recipients for World War I
- List of Medal of Honor recipients during peacetime
- List of Medal of Honor recipients during the Occupation of Nicaragua
