= Mohawk (YT-17) =

US Navy tug

History

United States
- Name: Mohawk
- Namesake: The Mohawk Native American tribe
- Builder: T. S. Marval and Company, Newburgh, New York
- Laid down: 1893
- Launched: 1893
- Acquired: 23 April 1898
- Out of service: 1 October 1946
- Fate: Sunk as an artificial reef 1970
- Notes: Operated as civilian tug T. P. Fowler 1893–1898

General characteristics
- Displacement: 368 tons
- Length: 103 ft 10 in (31.65 m)
- Beam: 24 ft 0 in (7.32 m)
- Draft: 10 ft 9 in (3.28 m)
- Speed: 12 kts

The third Mohawk (YT‑17), later renamed YT-17 and YTL-17, was a tug that served in the United States Navy from 1898 to 1946.

Mohawk was built as the civilian tug T. P. Fowler in 1893 by T. S. Marval and Company, Newburgh, New York. She was acquired by the U.S. Navy from Cornell Steamboat Company on 23 April 1898 for service in the Spanish–American War and assigned to the 5th Naval District.

Mohawk operated in and around Norfolk Navy Yard, Norfolk, Virginia, for nearly half a century, making several voyages a year to naval installations throughout the Potomac River and Chesapeake Bay area, serving the fleet by towing barges and aiding naval vessels.

Designated YT‑17 in 1920, her name was changed from Mohawk to YT-17 in 1942. YT‑17 was renamed YTL‑17 in 1944 and continued service at Norfolk through the end of World War II.

YTL-17 was turned over to the War Shipping Administration for disposal on 1 October 1946 and sold to W. S. Sanders, Norfolk, Va., in 1948. She was subsequently resold to H. B. Stone of Wilmington, North Carolina. She was declared derelict in 1969 and sunk as an artificial reef off Wrightsville Beach, North Carolina, in 1970. The approximate position of the wreck is 34°02′N 077°52′W.
