= Alexander Gordon Lyle =

US Navy admiral and Medal of Honor recipient (1889–1955)

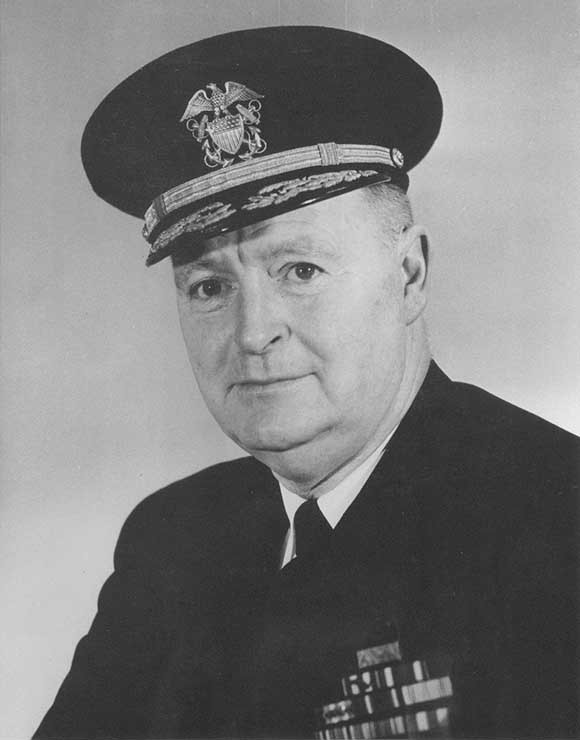
- Alexander Lyle, Medal of Honor recipient
- Born: November 12, 1889; Gloucester, Massachusetts, US
- Died: July 15, 1955 (aged 65); Portsmouth, Rhode Island, US
- Burial place: Arlington National Cemetery Arlington, Virginia
- Military career
- Allegiance: United States of America
- Branch: United States Navy
- Service years: 1915–1948
- Rank: Vice Admiral
- Units: Navy Dental Corps; 5th Marine Regiment
- Conflicts: World War I World War II
- Awards: Medal of Honor; Silver Star (2); Legion of Merit; Navy Commendation Medal

Alexander Gordon Lyle (November 12, 1889 – July 15, 1955) was an officer in the United States Navy who received the Medal of Honor for his actions during World War I. He is one of only three dental officers to have received the medal, the others being Weedon Osborne and Ben L. Salomon.

== Biography ==
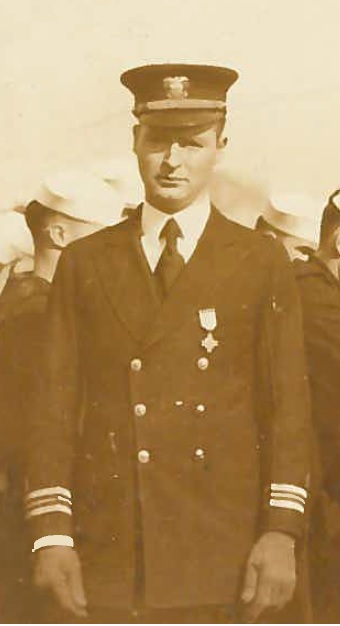
Lyle receiving the Tiffany Cross Medal of Honor (December 1920)

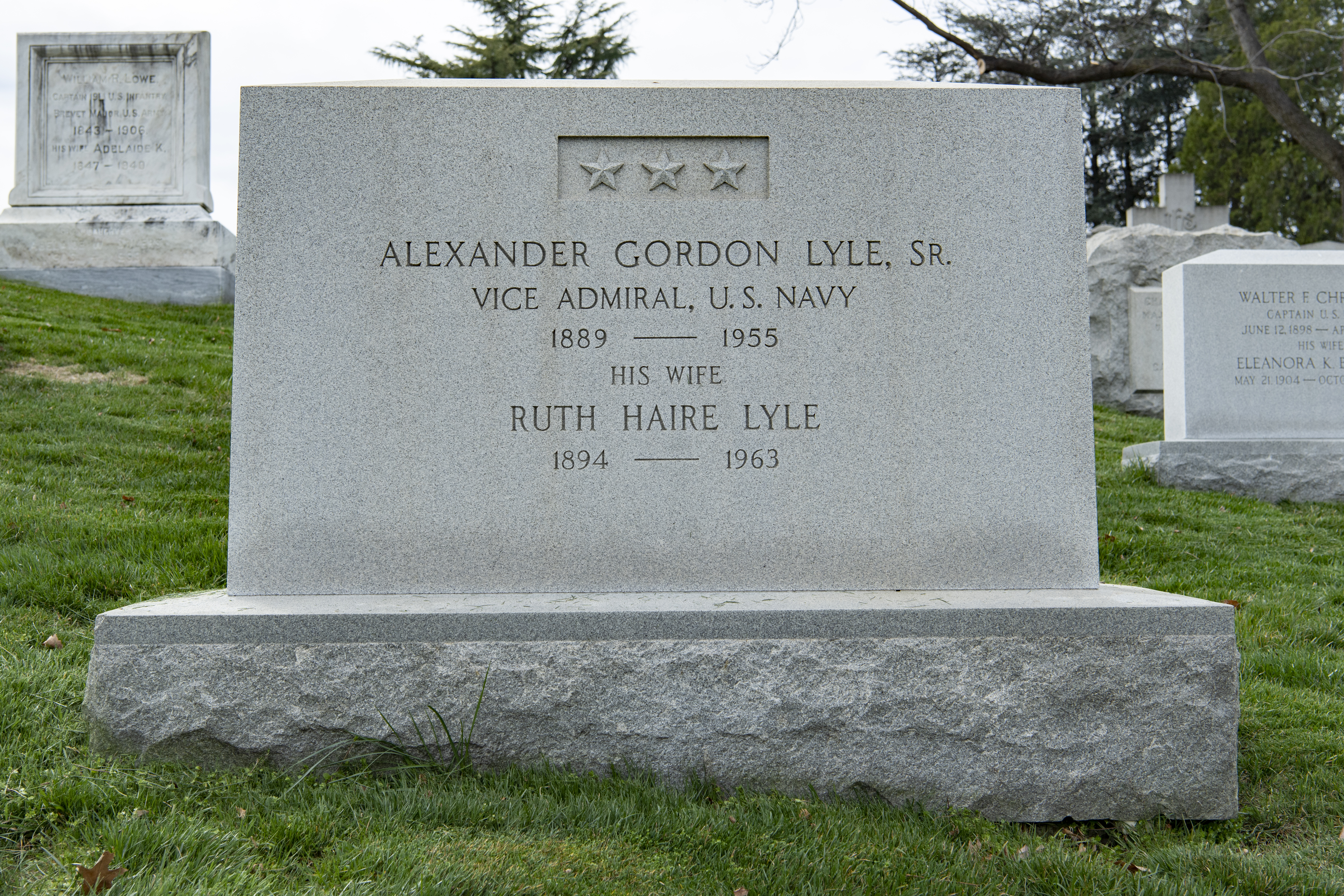
Grave at Arlington National Cemetery

Lyle was born in Gloucester, Massachusetts, on November 12, 1889. After graduating high school he went to Baltimore College, graduating in 1912 with a degree in dentistry. He accepted a commission in the navy as a lieutenant (junior grade) in 1915 while living in Massachusetts and retired August 1, 1948, at the rank of vice admiral.

Lyle was serving as a dental officer with the 5th Regiment of the United States Marine Corps on the French front during World War I. On April 23, 1918, he risked his life to rescue a corporal who had been seriously wounded during heavy shellfire. He saved the corporal's life by treating his wounds using surgical aid and became one of only three dental officers in history to receive the Medal of Honor. At the time of the award the navy still had two different versions of the Medal of Honor, one for combat operations and one for noncombat operations. For his actions saving the corporal's life, Lyle received the combat version of the Medal, known as the Tiffany Cross.

He died July 15, 1955, in Portsmouth, Rhode Island, and is buried with his wife Ruth Haire Lyle (1894–1963) at Arlington National Cemetery, in Arlington, Virginia.

Vice Admiral Lyle's medal can be seen on display at the National Naval Medical Center, Bethesda, Maryland. In addition to the Medal of Honor, Lyle also received the Legion of Merit, the Silver Star (with palms) and the Italian War Cross.

== Medal of Honor citation ==
Rank and organization: Lieutenant Commander (Dental Corps), U.S. Navy. Born: November 12, 1889, Gloucester, Mass. Appointed from: Massachusetts. Other Navy award: Legion of Merit.

Citation:

For extraordinary heroism and devotion to duty while serving with the 5th Regiment, U.S. Marine Corps. Under heavy shellfire, on April 23, 1918, on the French Front, Lt. Comdr. Lyle rushed to the assistance of Cpl. Thomas Regan, who was seriously wounded, and administered such effective surgical aid while bombardment was still continuing, as to save the life of Cpl. Regan.

== See also ==
- List of Medal of Honor recipients
- List of Medal of Honor recipients for World War I
