= United States Naval Hospital =

United States Naval Hospital may refer to Naval Hospitals:

== In the United States ==
- Naval Health Clinic New England
- Naval Medical Research Center
- Banning General Hospital, a military hospital in Banning, California
- Naval Hospital Lemoore at Naval Air Station Lemoore, California
- Naval Medical Center San Diego, informally referred to as "Balboa Hospital", in California
- Naval Hospital Jacksonville, at Naval Air Station Jacksonville, in Jacksonville, Florida
- Naval Hospital Pensacola, in Florida
- Captain James A. Lovell Federal Health Care Center, in Chicago, Illinois
- Naval Health Clinic Annapolis, at United States Naval Academy in Maryland
- Walter Reed National Military Medical Center, Bethesda, Maryland
- Naval Hospital Camp Lejeune, in North Carolina
- United States Naval Hospital Beaufort, in Port Royal, South Carolina
- Naval Medical Center Portsmouth, in Portsmouth, Virginia
- Old Naval Hospital, in Washington, D.C.
- Naval Hospital Bremerton, in Bremerton, Washington

== In other countries ==
- Naval Hospital Yokosuka Japan
- U.S. Naval Hospital, Subic Bay, Philippines

== Former Naval Hospitals in California ==
- McCornack General Hospital (World War 2 only), in Pasadena
- Naval Hospital Corona (World War 2 only), in Norco
- Naval Convalescent Hospital, Santa Cruz
- Yosemite Naval Convalescent Hospital at the Ahwahnee Hotel (World War 2 only)
- San Leandro Naval Hospital (World War 2 only)
- Long Beach Naval Hospital (1964-1994), now Long Beach Towne Center
- Naval Hospital Long Beach (1941-1950), now a VA health center
- Naval Hospital Oakland (1942-1996), also known as Oak Knoll Naval Hospital
- Naval Convalescent Hospital Beaumont
- Naval Convalescent Hospital Arrowhead Springs
- Alameda Naval Hospital (1941-1975)
