= Naval Hospital =

Naval Hospital may refer to:

== Hospitals in the United States ==
- Alameda Naval Hospital, California (1941-1975)
- Naval Hospital Camp Pendleton, Camp Pendleton, California
- Naval Hospital Lemoore, at Naval Air Station Lemoore, Lemoore Station, California
- Mound City Civil War Naval Hospital, Mound City, Illinois
- Naval Hospital Oakland, Oakland, California
- Bob Wilson Naval Hospital, San Diego, California
- Naval Hospital Jacksonville, at Naval Air Station Jacksonville, Florida
- Naval Hospital Pensacola, Florida
- Naval Hospital Corps School (1913–2011), Lake County, Illinois
- Bethesda Naval Hospital, Bethesda, Maryland
- Naval Hospital Boston Historic District, Chelsea, Massachusetts
- Naval Hospital Beaufort, South Carolina
- Naval Medical Center Portsmouth, Virginia, formerly known as Naval Hospital Portsmouth
- Naval Hospital Bremerton, Bremerton, Washington
- Naval Medical Center Camp Lejeune, North Carolina
- Naval Hospital Guam

=== World War II hospitals ===
- Naval Hospital Corona (1941–1949, re-opened for the Korean War), California
- Naval Convalescent Hospital, Santa Cruz (1943–1946), California
- Yosemite Naval Convalescent Hospital (1943–?) at the Ahwahnee Hotel, California
- San Leandro Naval Hospital (1944–1946), Oakland, California
- Naval Hospital Long Beach (1941-1950), now VA Long Beach Healthcare System
- Naval Convalescent Hospital Beaumont (1942–1945), California
- Naval Convalescent Hospital Arrowhead Springs (1942-1945)

== Hospitals elsewhere ==
- Naval Hospital of Puerto Williams, Chile, Chile Navy, (1953- )
- Naval Hospital Yokosuka Japan
- U.S. Naval Hospital, Subic Bay, Philippines

== See also ==
- Naval Medical Research Center, United States
- Royal Naval Hospital (disambiguation)
- United States Naval Hospital (disambiguation)
