= U.S. Naval Hospital =

U.S. Naval Hospital may refer to:

- Walter Reed National Military Medical Center, Bethesda, Maryland
- U.S. Naval Hospital, Subic Bay, the main medical facility of the U.S. Naval Forces, Philippines
- Naval Medical Center San Diego
- Naval Hospital Yokosuka Japan
- U.S. Naval Hospital, Naples
- Naval Hospital Guam
