= Philippine Republic Presidential Unit Citation =

Philippine Presidential Unit Citation Badge
- Philippine Republic Presidential Unit Citation Badge
- Type: Service ribbon
- Awarded for: Extraordinary meritorious service
- Description: Is a ribbon bar consisting of equal portions starting from the left side, of blue, white, and red encased in a gold colored frame decorated with laurel leaves.
- Presented by: The Republic of the Philippines
- Eligibility: Military Personnel and Police Personnel
- Status: Currently awarded
- Established: September 14, 1946
- First award: 1940s
- Final award: Ongoing
- Streamer

Precedence
- Next (higher): Philippine Liberation Medal
- Next (lower): Long Service Medal
- Related: Presidential Unit Citation (US)

The Philippine Presidential Unit citation Badge is a unit decoration of the Republic of the Philippines. It has been awarded to certain units of the United States military and the Philippine Commonwealth military for actions both during and subsequent to the Second World War.

== Appearance and wear ==
When the Philippine Presidential Unit Citation is worn on the Philippine military uniform (right side) it is as a blue, white, and red ribbon 1 3/8 inches (35 mm) wide surrounded by a gold frame. No U.S. ribbon devices are authorized for wear with this award.

=== Smaller version ===
Foreign military unit members who are authorized to wear this unit award, either wear the award on the right side of the uniform (e.g., United States Army) with any other same size unit award emblems or wear the slightly smaller size version of the award on the left side of the uniform (e.g., United States Navy, United States Marine Corps, United States Coast Guard, United States Air Force) with their other service ribbons.

== History ==
The Philippine Republic Presidential Unit Citation Badge (PRPUCB) was established by Headquarters, Philippine National Defense Forces, on September 14, 1946, to be award for extraordinary meritorious service during World War II. The award is made in the name of the President of the Republic of the Philippines.

=== World War II ===
All U.S. military units and naval vessels that earned any of the Philippine service stars and certain submarines which maintained physical contact with the newly established armed forces of the Commonwealth of the Philippines and local recognized guerrilla forces during the Japanese occupation of the Philippine Islands during World War II are entitled to the award:

- For service in defense of the Philippines from December 7, 1941, to May 10, 1942
- For service in the liberation of the Philippines from October 17, 1944, to July 4, 1945

=== Disaster relief operations ===
The Philippine Presidential Unit Citation for disaster relief operations was bestowed on:

- The Philippine military and the U.S. Navy Disaster Task Force (September 1 to December 14, 1970) and Navy and Marine Corps Units of Joint U.S. Military Advisory Group, Philippines Amphibious Ready Group Alpha (October 21–26, 1970) for relief efforts during several natural disasters which occurred in the Philippines during August 1 to December 15, 1970 (a series of typhoons) and from July 21 to August 15, 1972 (monsoon rains and associated floods).
- The U.S. Naval Hospital, Subic Bay for the period of August 1, 1987, to November 30, 1991, and
- The guided-missile cruiser USS Sterett (CG-31) for the period of May 1989 to June 1999.
- Joint Task Force 510 and Joint Special Operations Task Force-Philippines in February 2005, by President Gloria Macapagal Arroyo to members of the two units serving between January 31, 2002, and July 31, 2002, in support of RP-US Exercise Balikatan 02–1 in Southern Mindanao. JTF-510/JSOTF-Philippines aimed at reducing the threats of terrorism and provided assistance with training, socio-economic activities and civil engineering projects, particularly in Basilan and Zamboanga City (Ref: RP General Order No. 146, dated Feb 2, 5, Subj: Award of the Philippine Republic Presidential Unit citation Badge).

== See also ==
- Awards and decorations of the Armed Forces of the Philippines
- Presidential Unit Citation
- Presidential Unit Citation (Vietnam)
- Presidential Unit Citation (South Korea)
