= David Fairrington =

American painter (1940–2026)

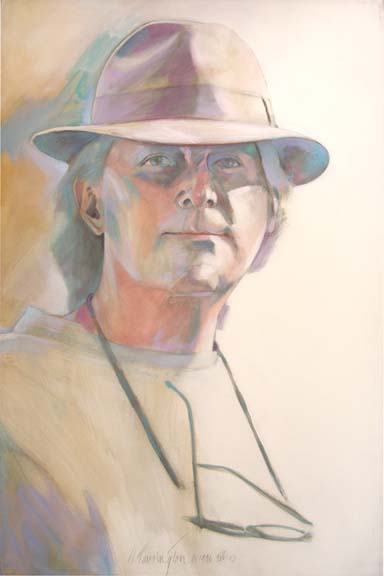
- Self portrait of Fairrington
- Born: David Neal Fairrington; October 18, 1940; Fort Lewis, Washington, U.S.
- Died: June 10, 2026 (aged 85)
- Known for: Painter
- Movement: Portrait
- Awards: Official portrait artist for the Pentagon

David Fairrington (October 18, 1940 – June 10, 2026) was an American artist. Mostly associated with his realistic portraits, Fairrington painted a variety of subjects including landscapes, still life, and western art in a range of styles including abstract, conceptual, fantasy, figurative, impressionist, pop art and romantic. He attributed artist John Singer Sargent and Norman Rockwell as significant influences upon his work.

== Early life ==
Fairrington was born into a military household in 1940 at Fort Lewis. His father, Ralph W. Fairrington was a career soldier in the United States Air Force. His mother was Grace L. Fairrington. Inspired by the popularity of an older brother who could draw, Fairrington tried his hand at sketching airplanes but soon discovered he could draw faces well enough that people were willing to pay him for portraits. His used this talent to help pay his way through Texas Technological College, now known as Texas Tech University. While at Texas Tech, Fairrington also served as a staff artist for the 1961 La Ventana yearbook. He graduated in 1964, with a bachelor's degree in advertising art and design. That year he was also selected as a winning artist in the Motorola National Competitive Exhibition. Fairrington spent the next spent two years working for different advertising agencies.

== Vietnam Combat Art Program ==
In 1966 Fairrington was drafted into the United States Army. He completed basic training at Fort Polk and was assigned to the Postal Department at Fort Sill. During his off-duty hours, he took art classes at South Eastern College in Lawton, Oklahoma.

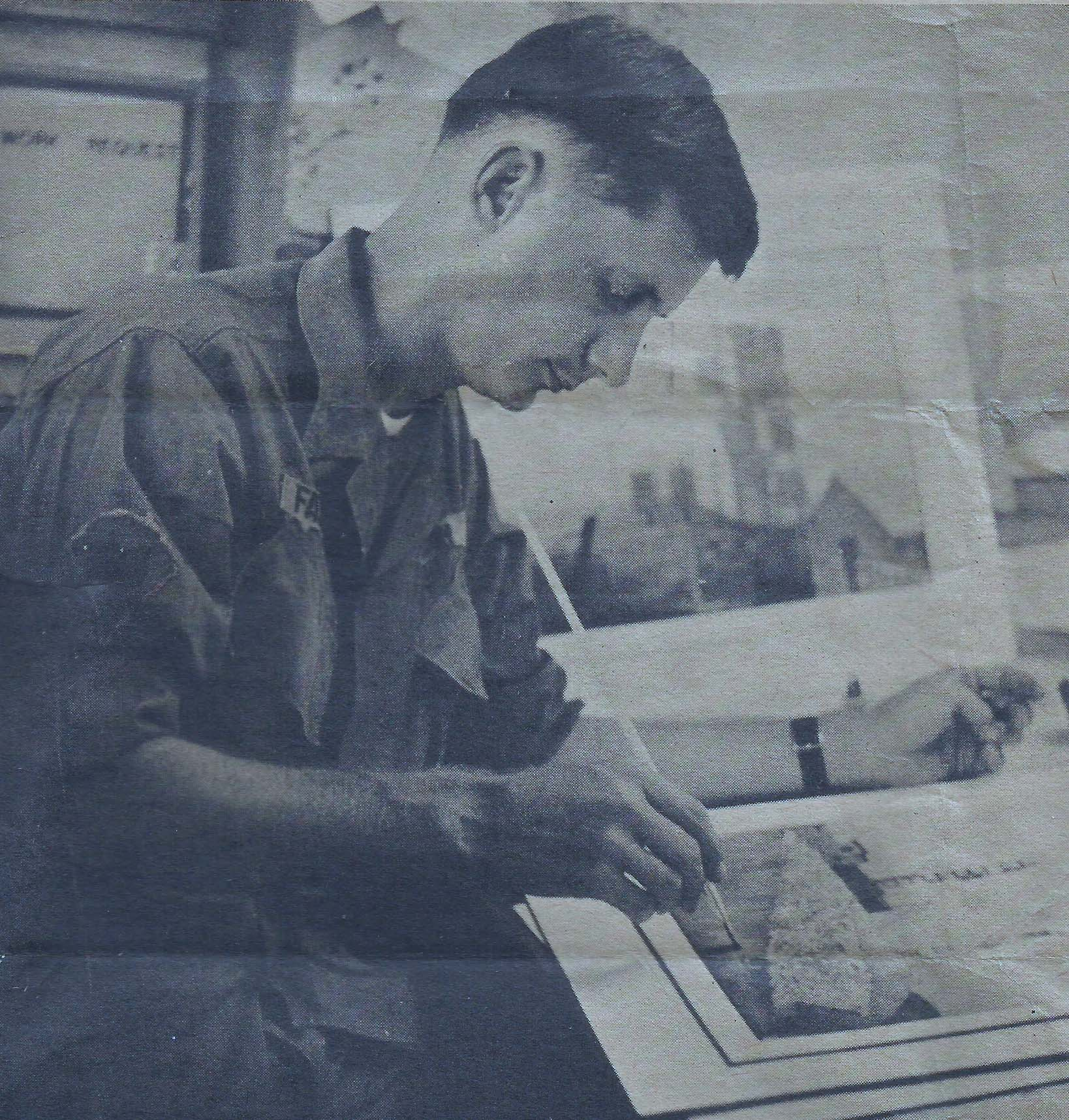
Combat artist Spec. 4 David Fairrington puts the final touches on a painting before it is shipped to the U.S. Army's Center for Military History, 1968

After a year at Fort Sill, Fairrington received orders sending him to the 43rd Signal Battalion based in Pleiku. While there he heard about the Vietnam Combat Artists Program and submitted an application along with a collection of drawings and paintings. He was accepted into the program and assigned to the Army Combat Artist Team VI in Saigon.

After 60 days of temporary duty capturing his impressions in preliminary sketches, Fairrington flew to Hawaii to complete his paintings. His work was exhibited at Ala Moana Center and Schofield Barracks before being shipped back to the Army archives in Washington, D.C. With the artwork complete, he found he still had three weeks of service left and returned to Vietnam to finish his tour of duty.

The art completed by Fairrington during his assignment as a Vietnam soldier-artist is now in the permanent US Army Art collection, maintained by the United States Army Center of Military History (CMH), Washington, D.C. Some of his work was selected for "The Art of Combat: Artists and the Vietnam War, Then and Now" exhibited at the Indianapolis Art Center from October 2000 to January 2001.

Fairrington's art was included in the exhibit "Art of the American Soldier", organized by the U.S. Army Center of Military History that was displayed at the National Constitution Center in Philadelphia, in 2010 and is now maintained online.

== Post-military art career ==
In 1968, following his military service, Fairrington moved to Oakland, California, where he attended the San Francisco Art Institute. In 1969, he secured a position with Jack Wodell Associates, a film advertising agency. In 1972, Fairrington moved to Los Angeles when Wodell Associates opened an office there.

In 1978, Fairrington and a partner, Tami Masuda, opened a small design called New York West that produced graphics for the film industry. They worked on concept and design for over 150 posters for 20th Century Fox, Warner Bros., Columbia Pictures, Universal Pictures, Sony Pictures and Metro-Goldwyn-Mayer.

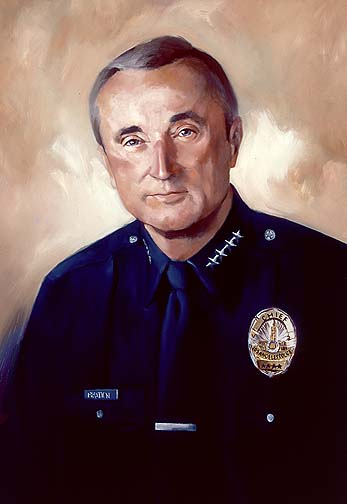
Former Chief of Police for the City of Los Angeles, William Bratton by David Fairrington, oil, 2003.

In 1995, Fairrington closed the design studio so he could concentrate on painting, although he continued to do occasional freelance work. His commissions included former Los Angeles Police Chief William Bratton, California Senator Alan Lowenthal and Democratic U.S. representative, Janice Hahn.

In 2004, Fairrington and his family moved from Los Angeles to Beaumont, California, where he took over the Banning Center for the Arts in nearby Banning, California, for a year. As director, he promoted community outreach by arranging the exhibit of artwork by young developing artists with older established artists. He also supervised and collaborated with artist Lucy Blake Elahi, under the direction of artist Lori Escalera, to work with Culver Park High School students, who produced a mural called "Rivers of the World."

Fairrington taught oil techniques and life drawing at the Desert Art Center in Palm Springs, California. He also conducted two day and week long painting workshops on the principles of portrait painting.

Fairrington also served as a judge in the 2009 Plein Air Exhibition at the Riverside Art Museum. In 2007, Fairrington was the featured artist for three months at the Edward-Dean Museum in Cherry Valley, California. In 2010, his work was exhibited by the Arts Council of the Temecula Valley.

His commissioned portrait of Arthur Ashe, painted for tennis star John McEnroe, appeared in Sports Illustrated magazine. He also occasionally produced celebrity portraits for the Walt Disney Company's ABC Television shows. He painted the stars of Lost, Desperate Housewives, Grey's Anatomy, Scrubs, Extreme Makeover: Home Edition and Legend of the Seeker.

He was named "Master Artist" by International Artist Magazine in 2001. He has also won first place at The National Orange Show's 2010 All-California Juried Art Exhibitionand The National Orange Show's Board of Directors' Purchase Award.

Fairrington was chosen by the U.S. government as one of the official portrait artists for employees of The Pentagon and other government agencies.

His artwork is included in numerous corporate and private collections and is on exhibit at Jack's Fine Art & Frame in Beaumont, California.

Fairrington was commissioned to paint dancers from several ballet companies around the United States, including School of American Ballet and New York City Ballet.

== Personal life and death ==
While teaching design at the Los Angeles County High School for the Arts, Fairrington met his wife, Lilly. The couple had one son, Nicolai. Fairrington was later divorced and resided in Cherry Valley, California. He taught art at the University of Redlands in Redlands, California. Farrington died on June 10, 2026, at the age of 85.

== Gallery ==
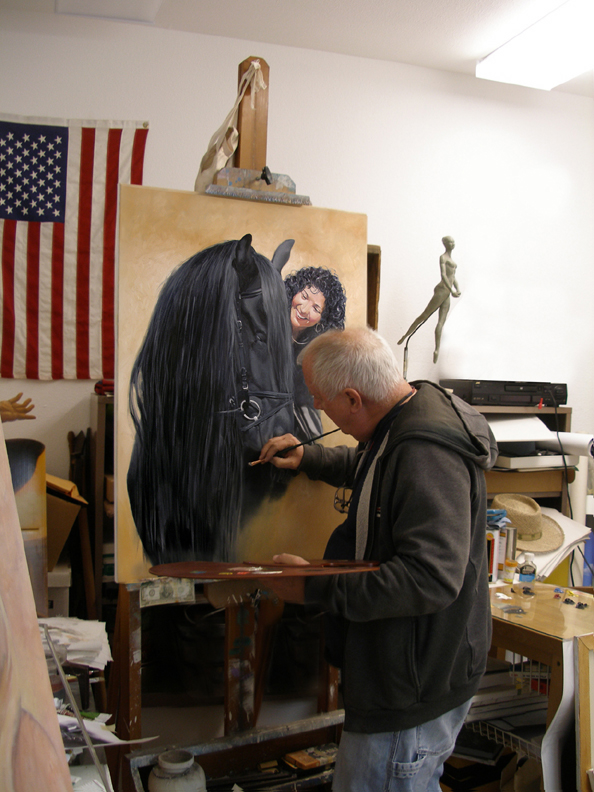
Fairrington Painting Barbara, 2010.

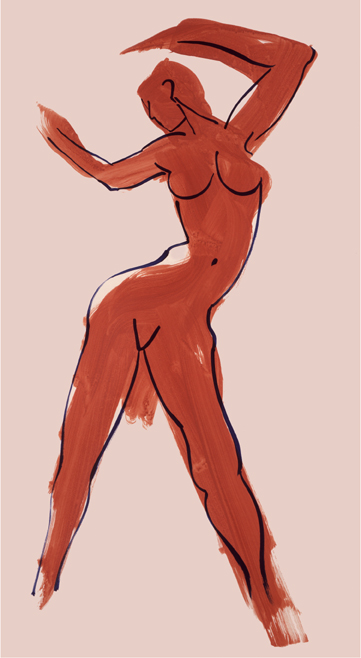
Dancer Orange by David Fairrington, acrylic, 1996.

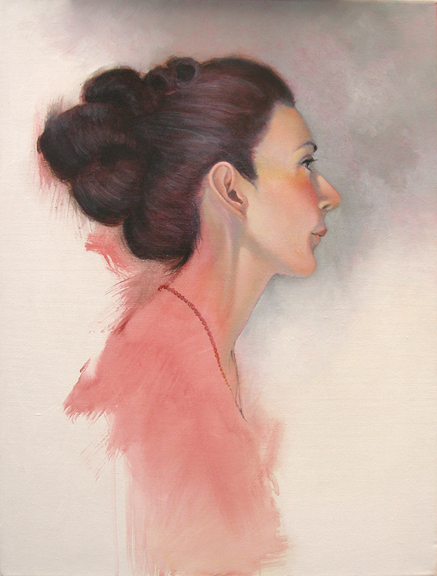
Cindy Carr by David Fairrington, oil, 2009.

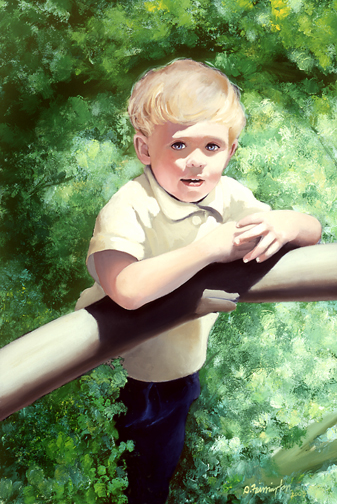
Cameron by David Fairrington, oil, 2007.

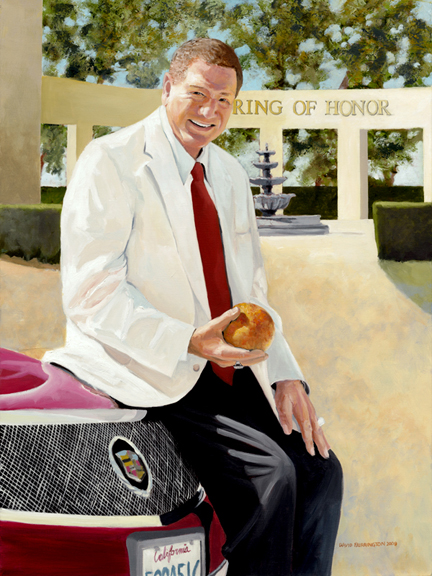
Bob Rochelle by David Fairrington, oil, 2010.

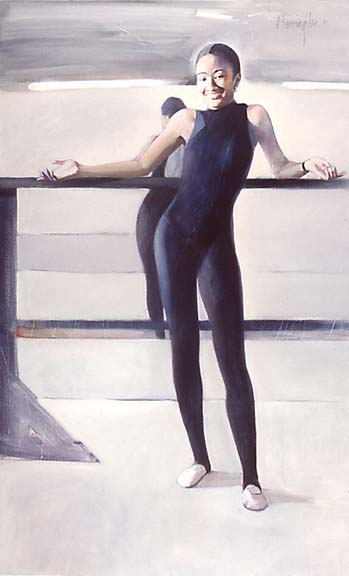
Korey Phillips by David Fairrington, acrylic, 1996.

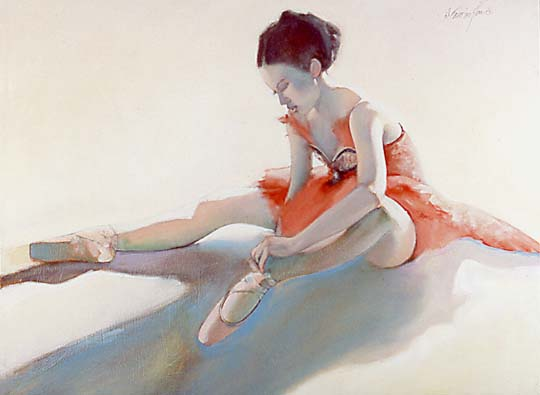
Michelle Sitting by David Fairrington, acrylic, 1996.

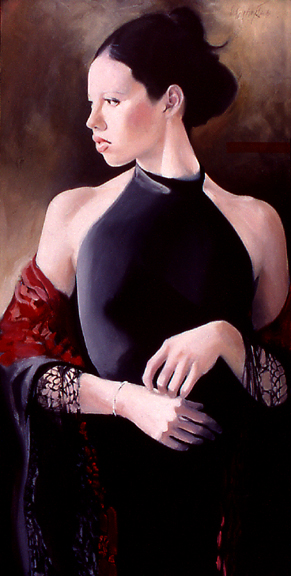
Ballet dancer Michelle Black by David Fairrington, acrylic, 1997.

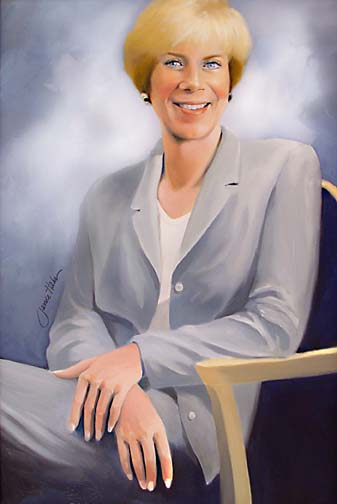
Democratic U.S. representative for California's 36th congressional district Janice Hahn by David Fairrington, oil, 2003.

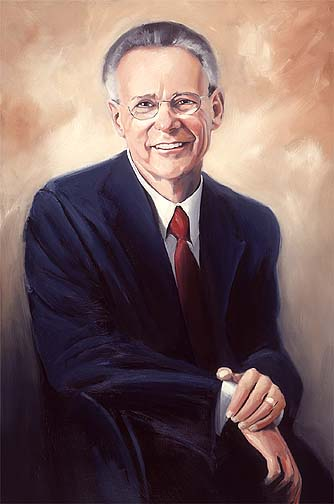
California Senator Alan Lowenthal by David Fairrington, oil, 2003.

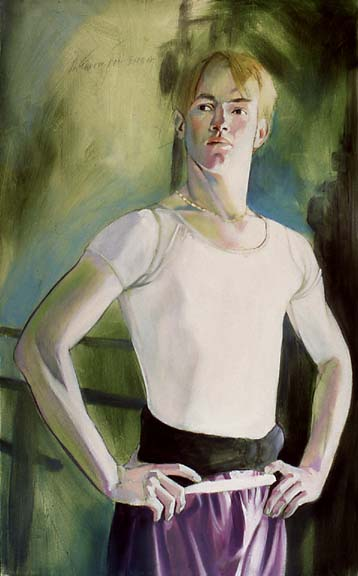
Michael by David Fairrington, acrylic, 1997.

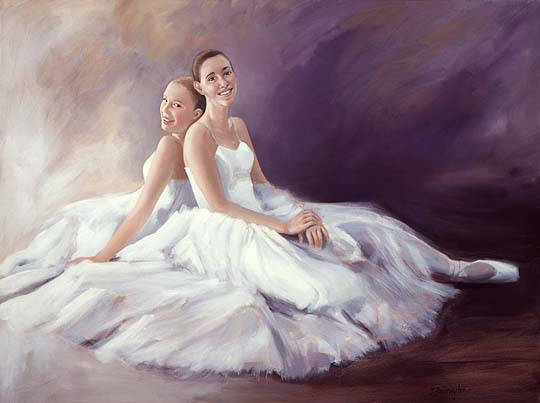
Meghan and Shannon by David Fairrington, oil, 2005.

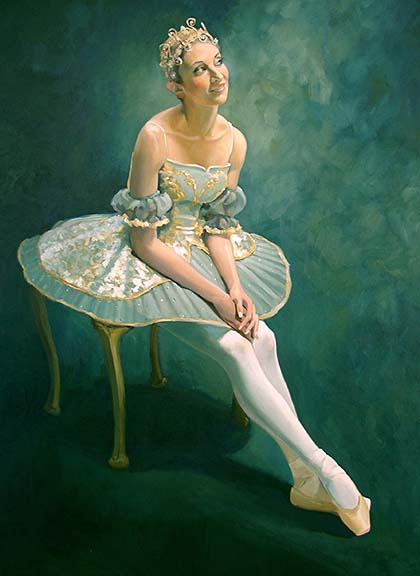
Alyssandra by David Fairrington, oil, 2007.

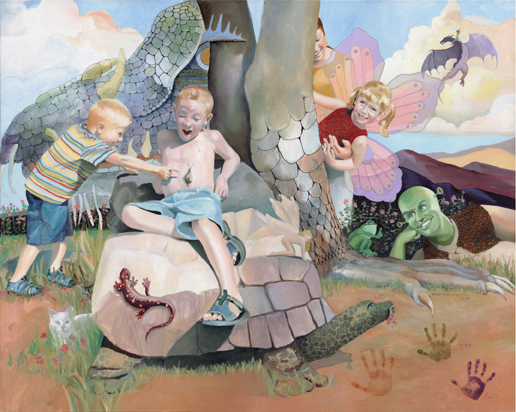
Mystical Adventure by David Fairrington, acrylic, 2009.

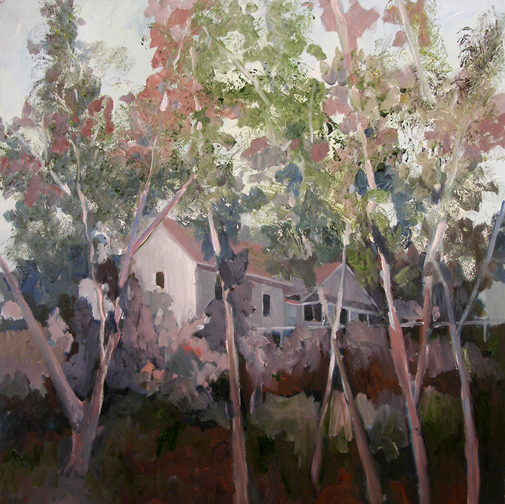
House on Morro Bay by David Fairrington, oil, 2011.

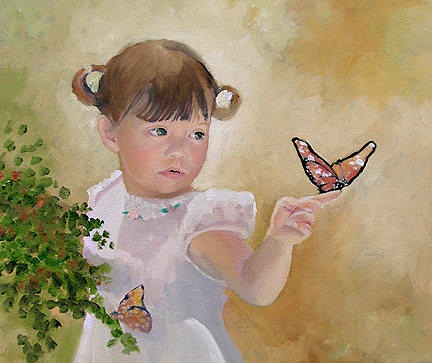
Girl with Butterfly by David Fairrington, oil, 2010.

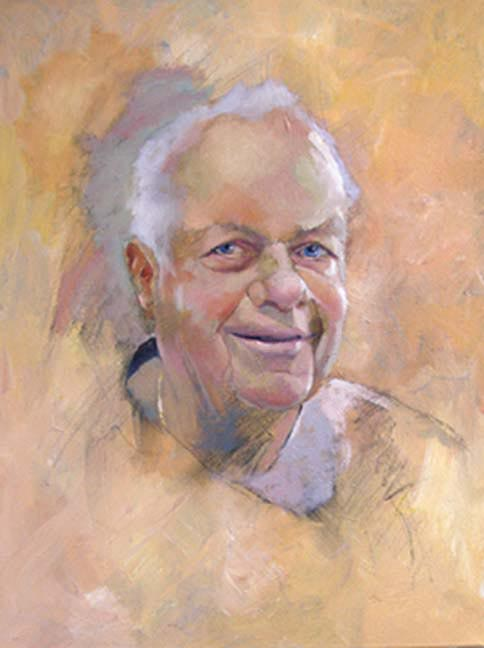
David Shatz by David Fairrington, oil, 2009.

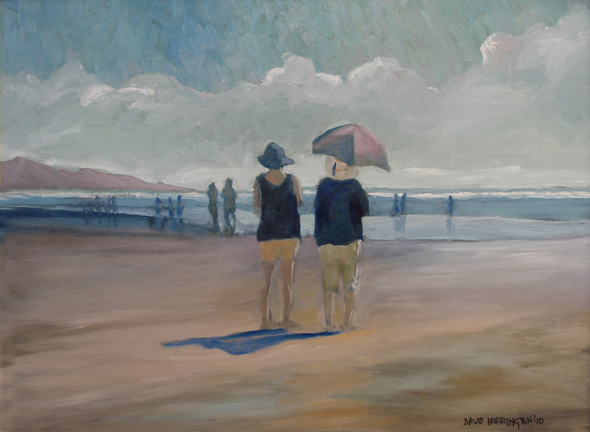
Del Mar by David Fairrington, oil, 2011.

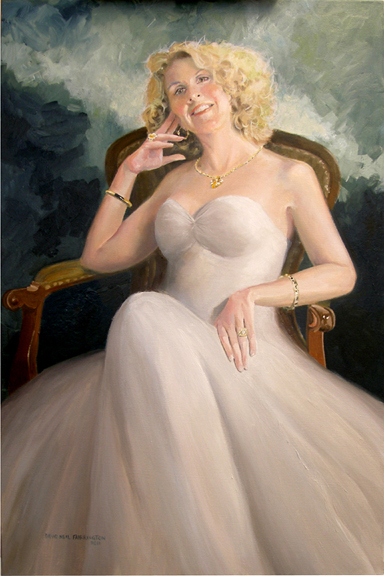
Donna by David Fairrington, oil, 2011.

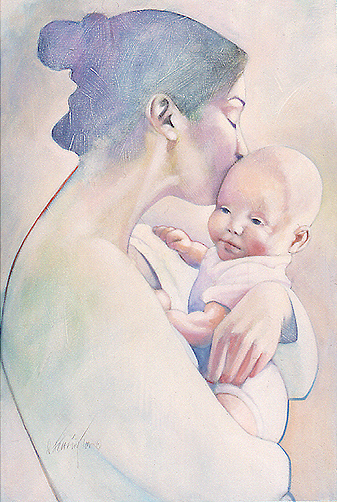
Dylan by David Fairrington, acrylic, 1997.

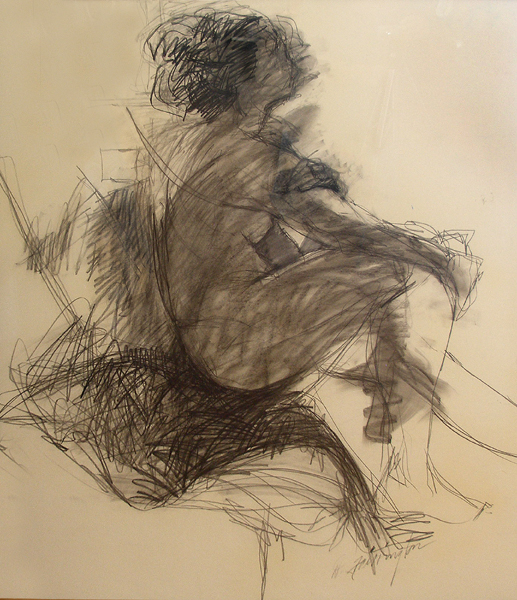
Female Form 1 by David Fairrington, charcoal, 2010.

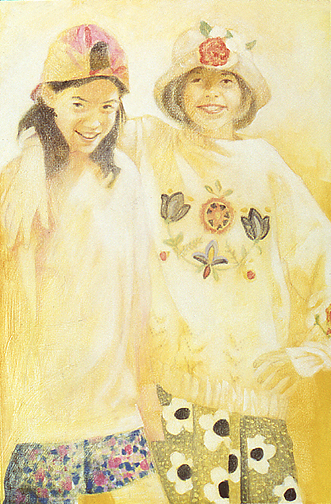
Friends by David Fairrington, acrylic, 2007.

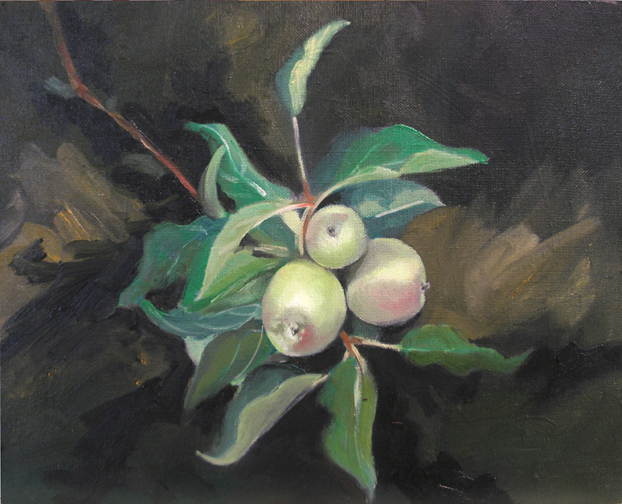
Green Apples by David Fairrington, oil, 2010.

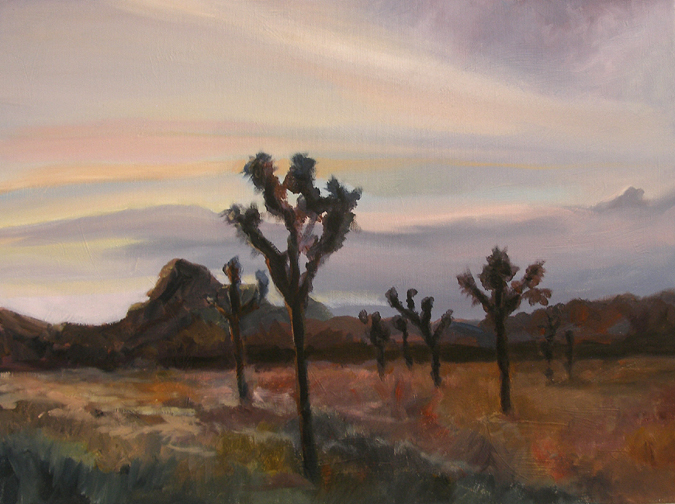
Joshua Tree Evening by David Fairrington, oil, 2001.

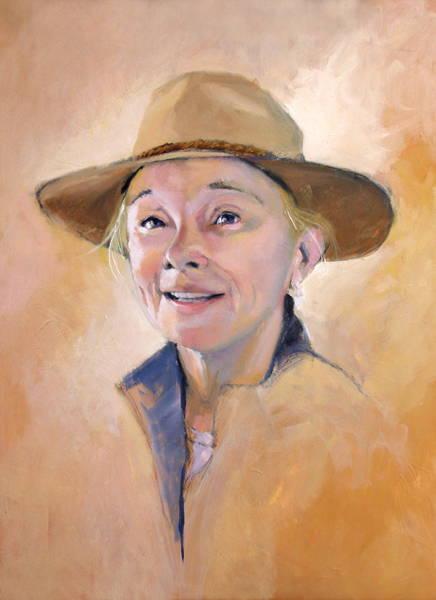
KT by David Fairrington, oil, 2010.

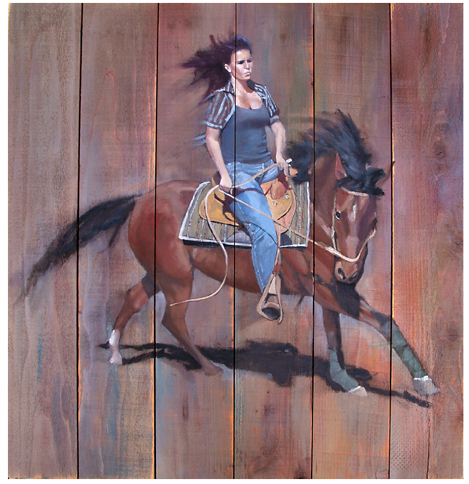
Laynie and Chocolate by David Fairrington, oil on wood, 2009.

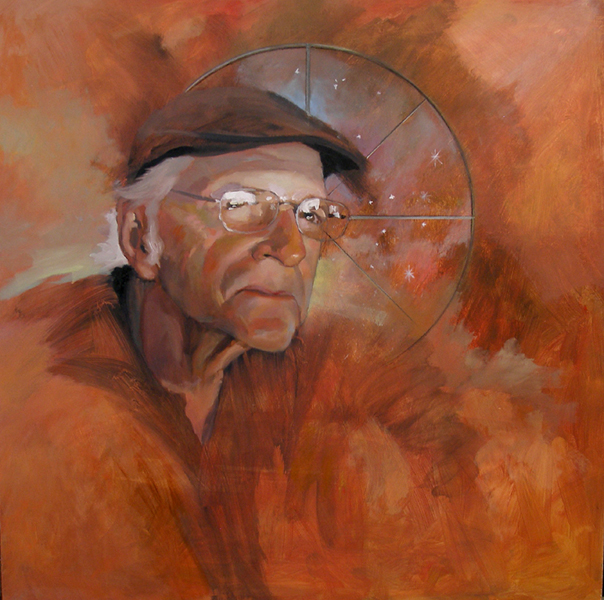
Leon Armantrout by David Fairrington, oil, 2011.

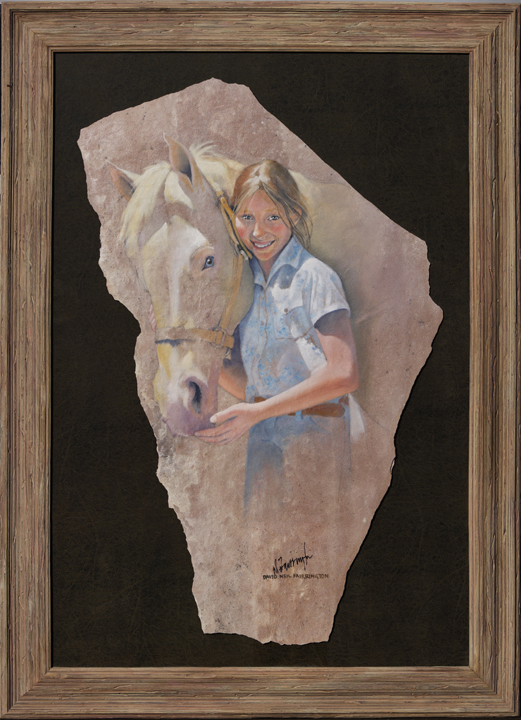
Lindsey by David Fairrington, oil on stone, 2009.

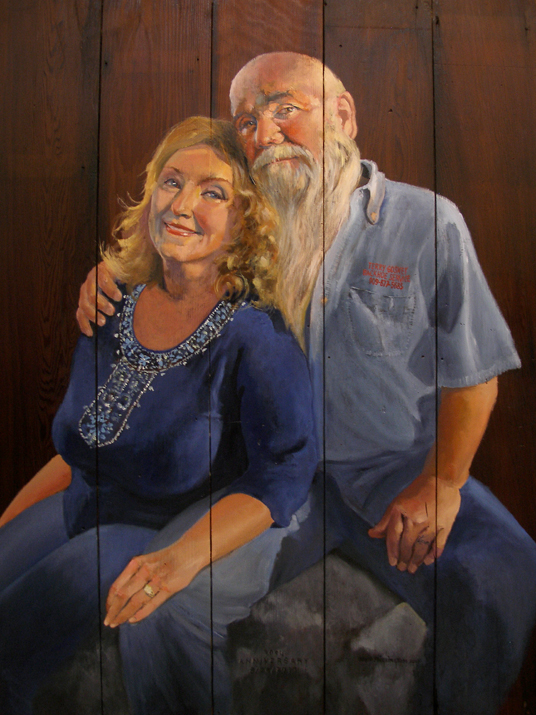
Lou and Terry by David Fairrington, oil on wood, 2011.

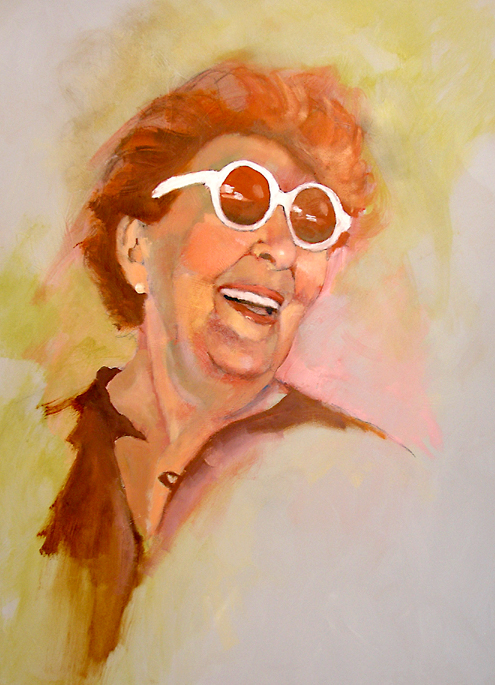
Marilyn by David Fairrington, oil, 2009.

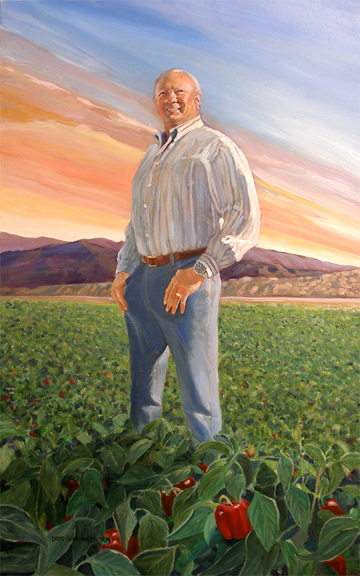
Mark by David Fairrington, oil, 2011.

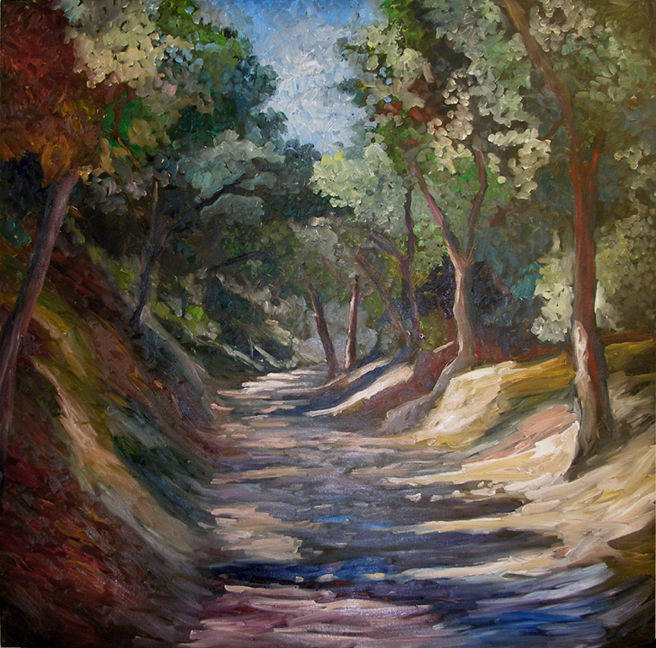
Mile High Road by David Fairrington, oil, 2010.

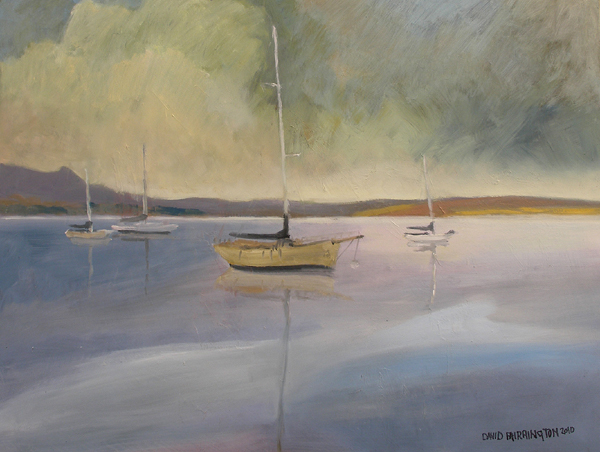
Morro Bay 2 by David Fairrington, 2011.

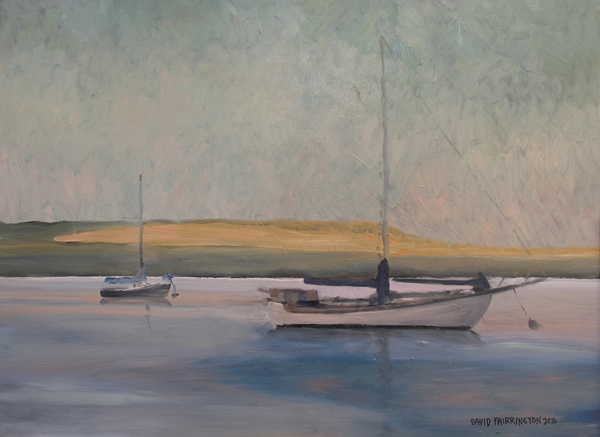
Morro Bay 1 by David Fairrington, 2011.

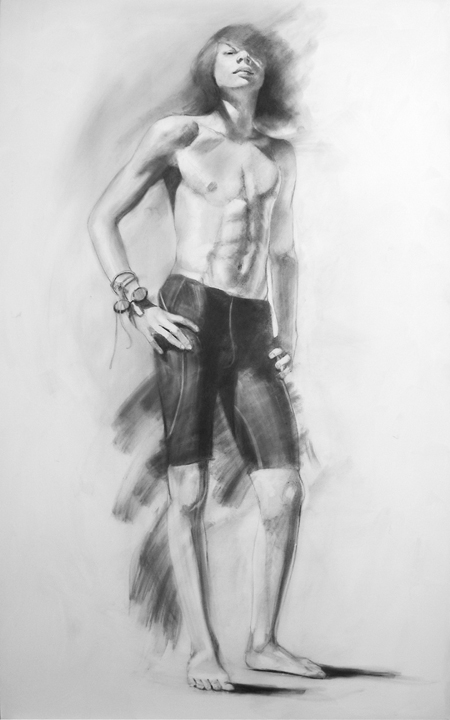
My son the swimmer by David Fairrington, charcoal, 2011.

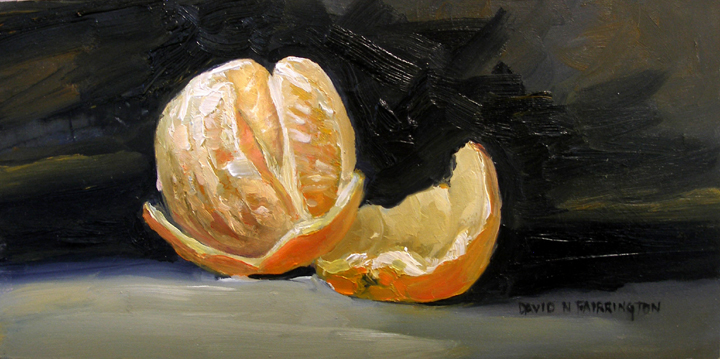
Peeled Orange by David Fairrington, oil, 2010.

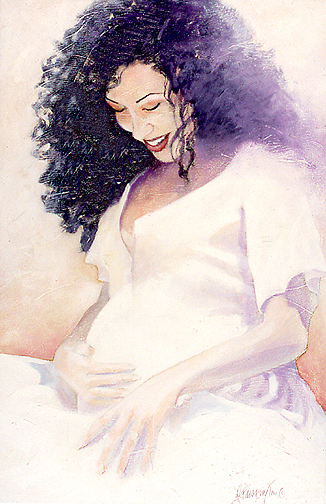
PG Lady by David Fairrington, acrylic, 1997.

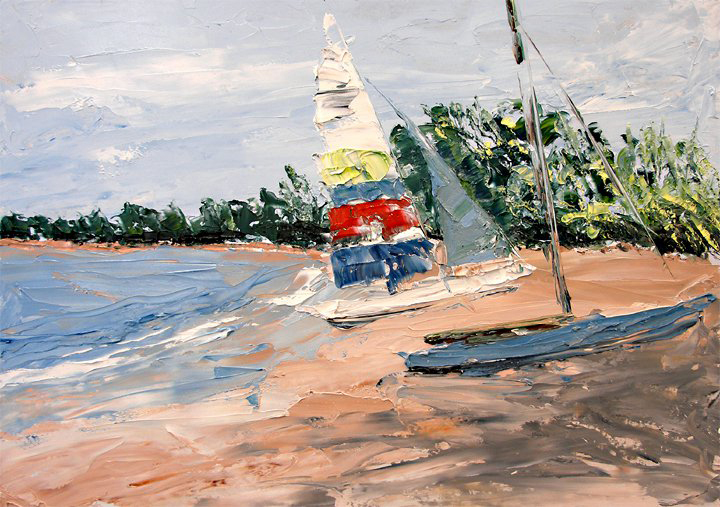
Roz's Sailboat by David Fairrington, oil, 2011.

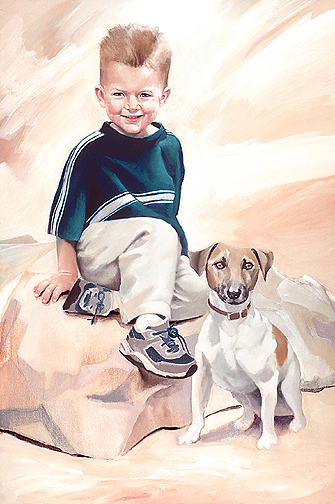
Ryan and Barkley by David Fairrington, oil, 2007.

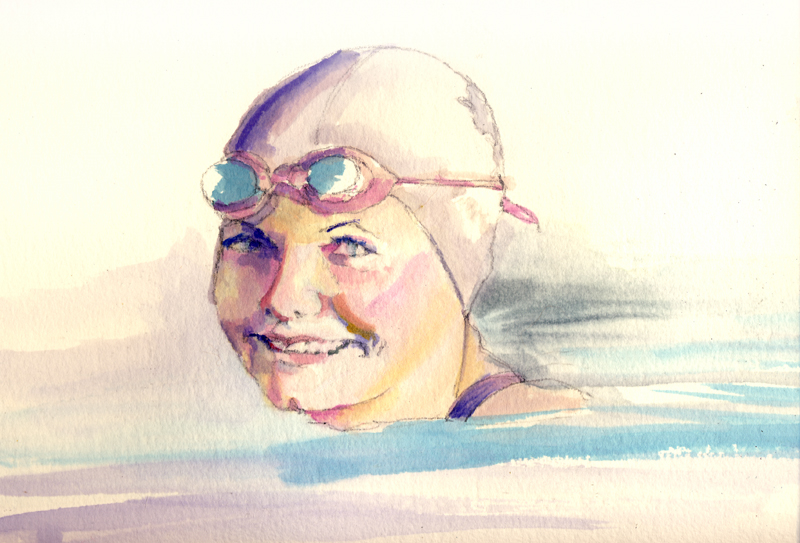
Summer Head by David Fairrington, watercolor, 2011.

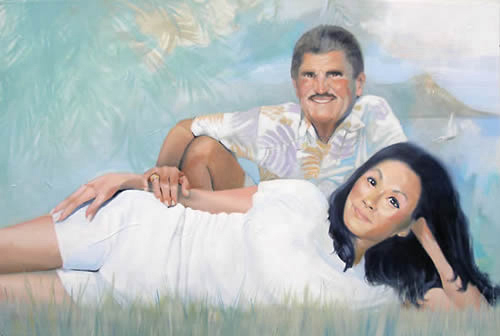
Tami and Fred by David Fairrington, oil, 2008.

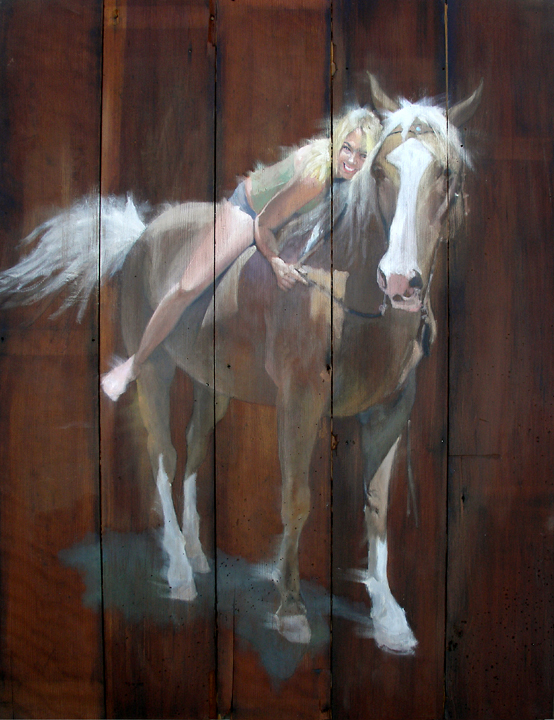
Tass Bareback by David Fairrington, oil on wood, 2009.

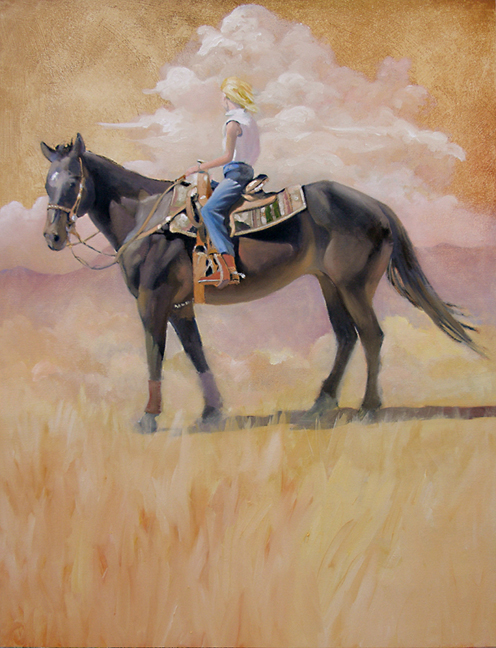
The General by David Fairrington, oil, 2009.

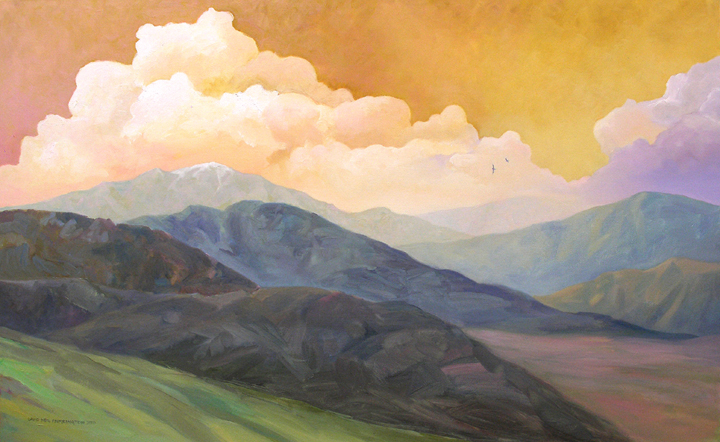
Yucaipa Mountains by David Fairrington, oil, 2010.

=== Military art gallery ===
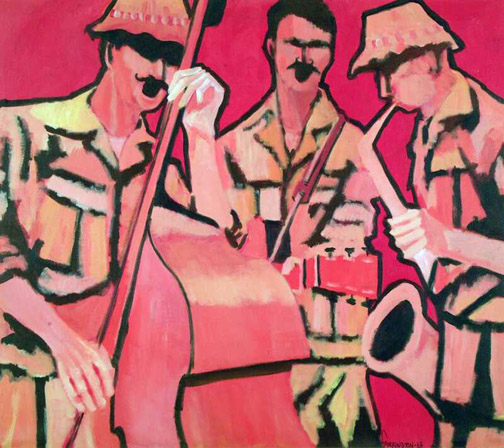
TIME OUT by David N. Fairrington, CAT VI, 1968

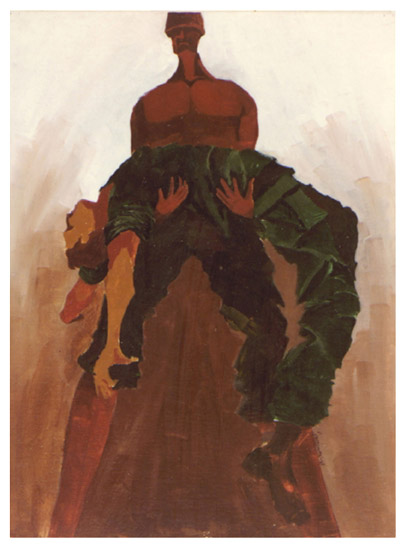
LONG BINH by David N. Fairrington, CAT VI, 1968

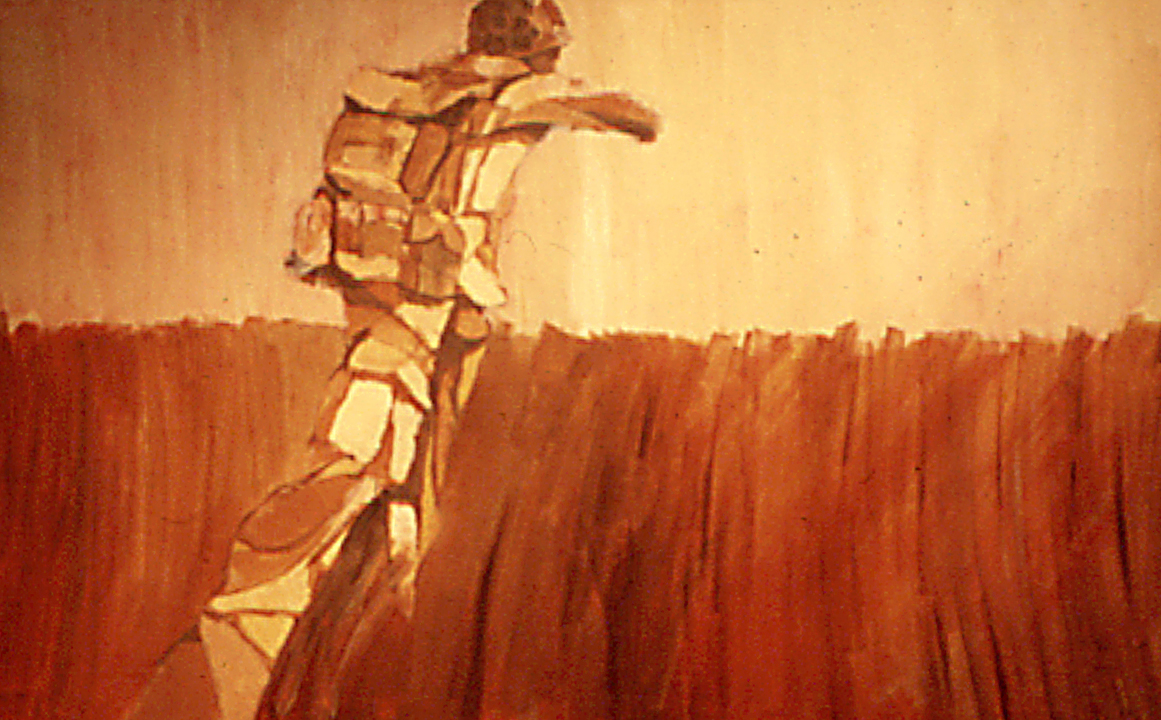
IN THE FIELD by David N. Fairrington, CAT VI, 1968

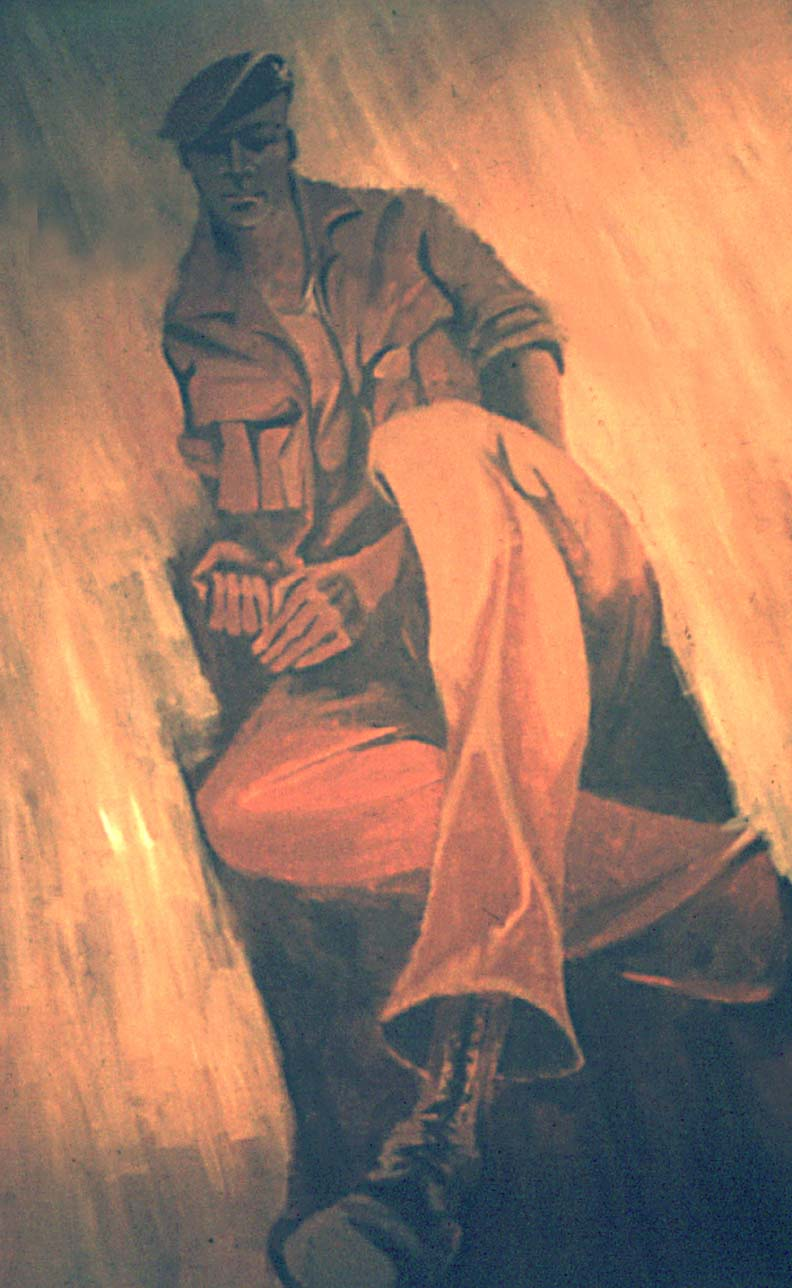
NAVY'S BEST by David N. Fairrington, CAT VI, 1968

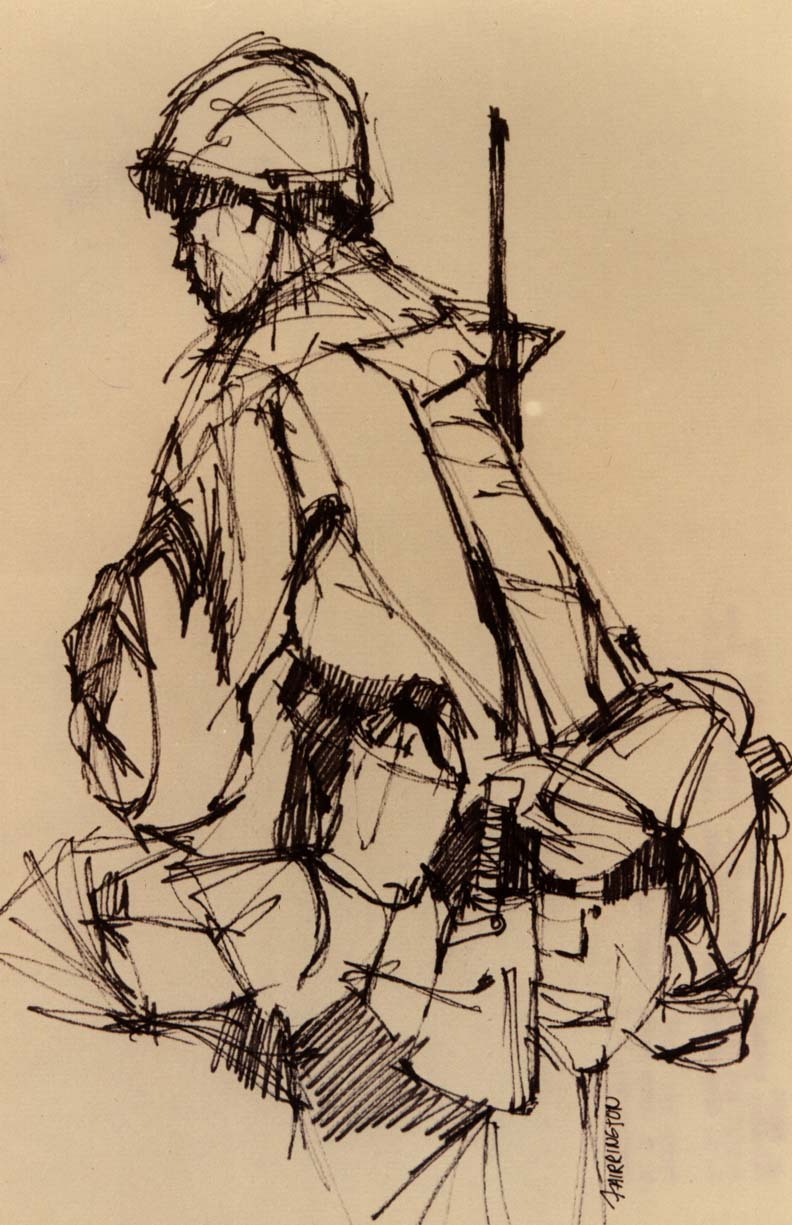
WAITING by David N. Fairrington, CAT VI, 1968

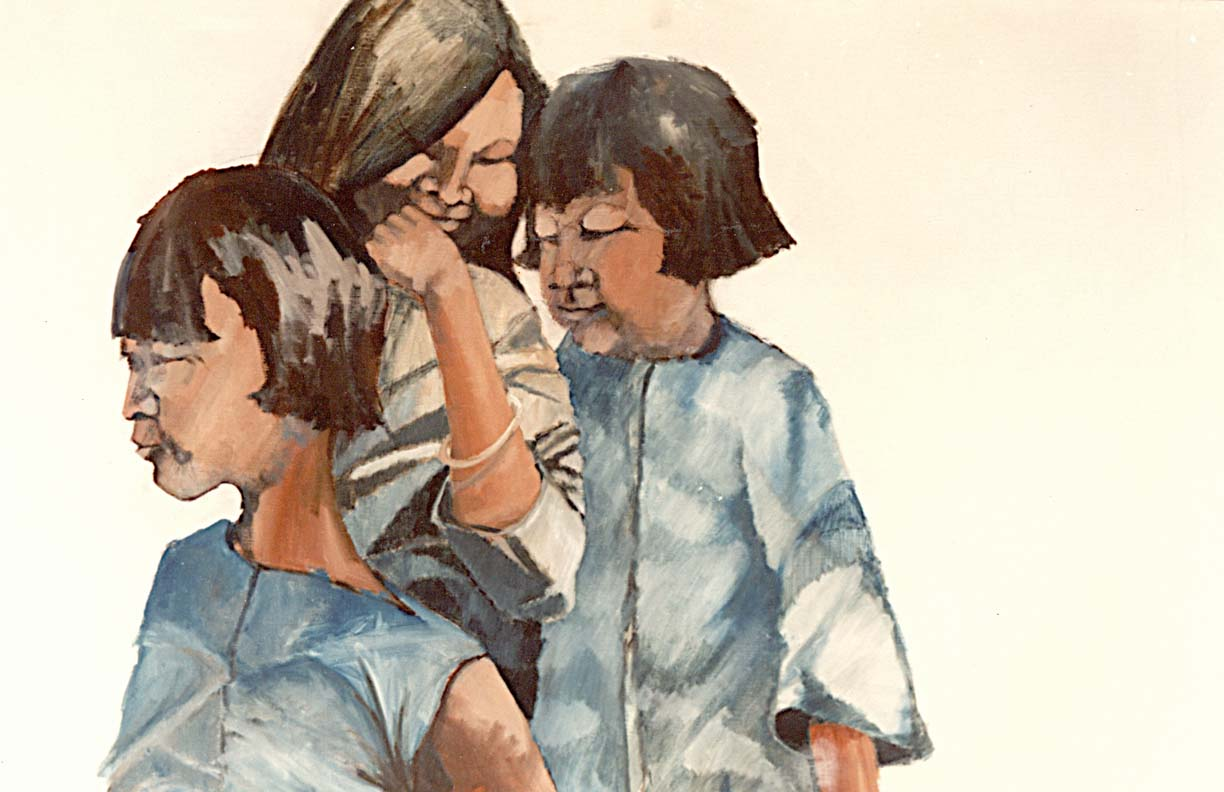
YOUNG GIRLS by David N. Fairrington, CAT VI, 1968

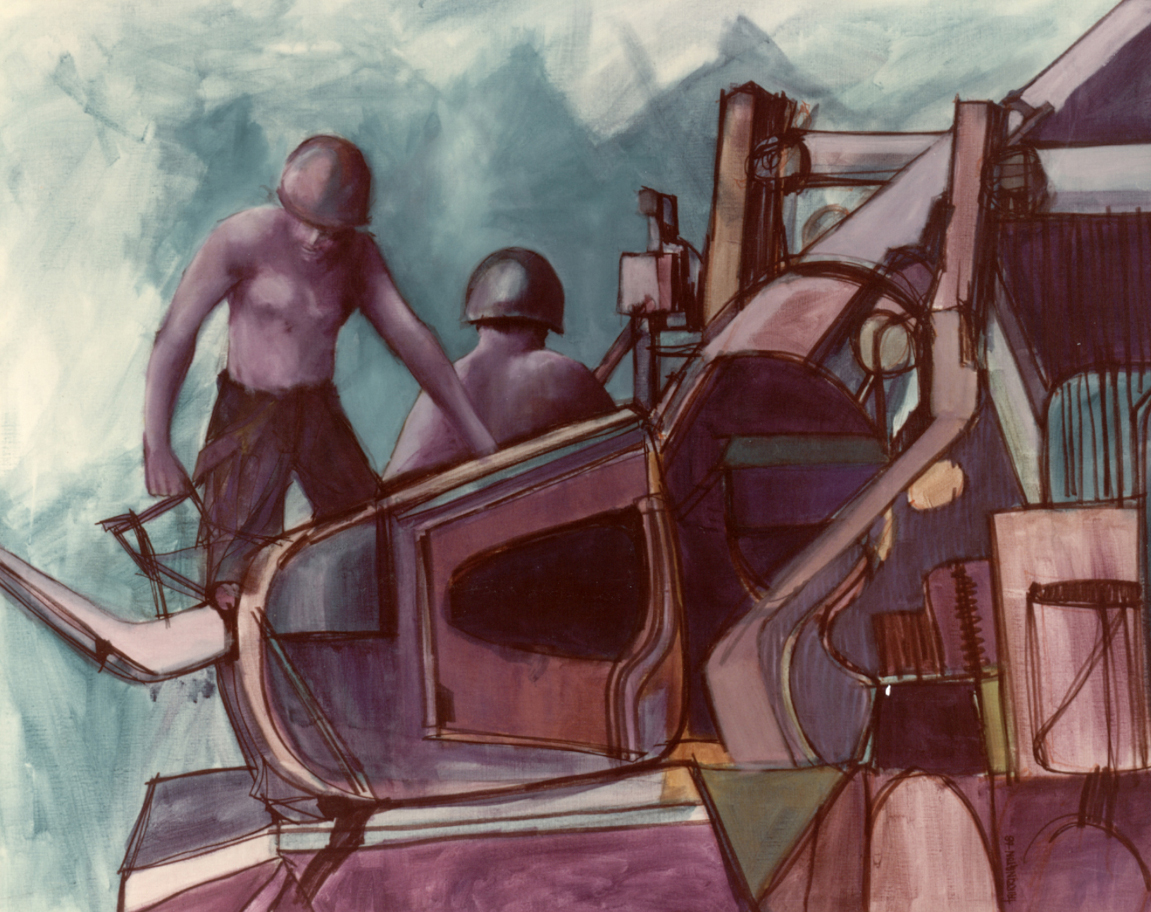
BIG GUNS by David N. Fairrington, CAT VI, 1968

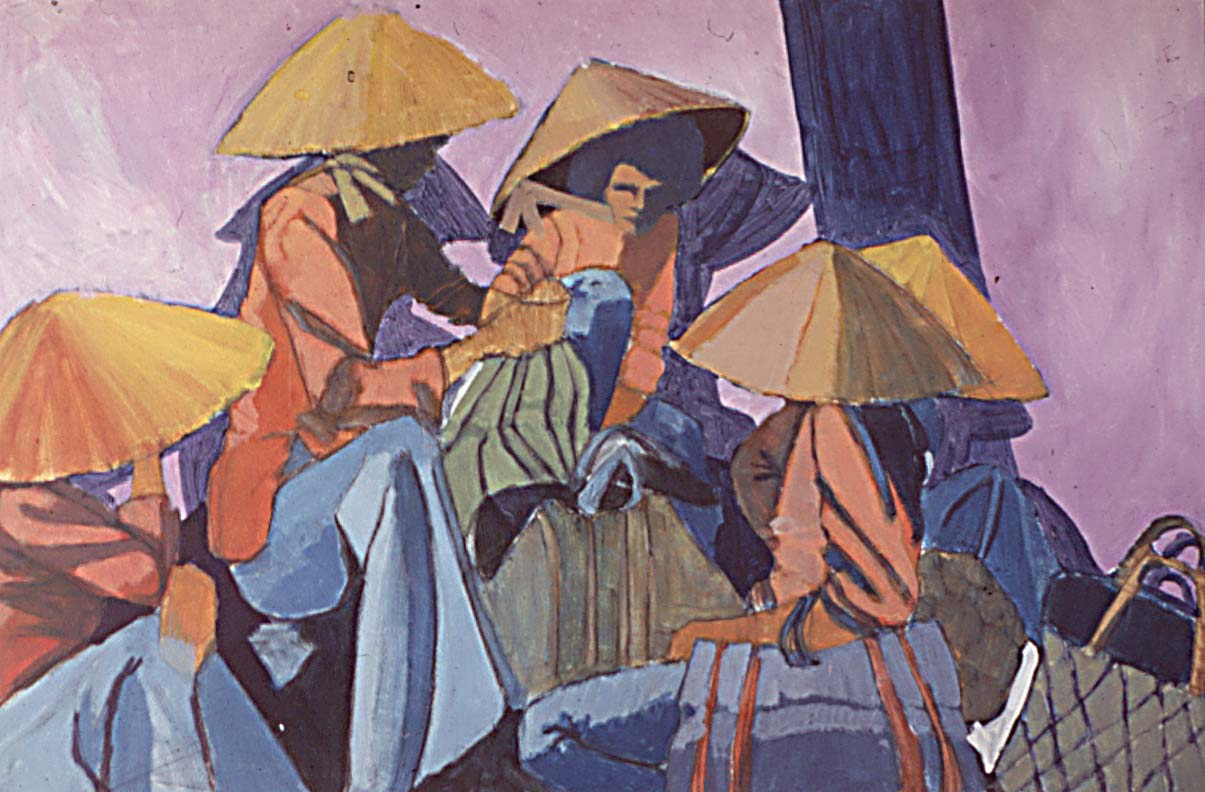
THE LADIES by David N. Fairrington, CAT VI, 1968

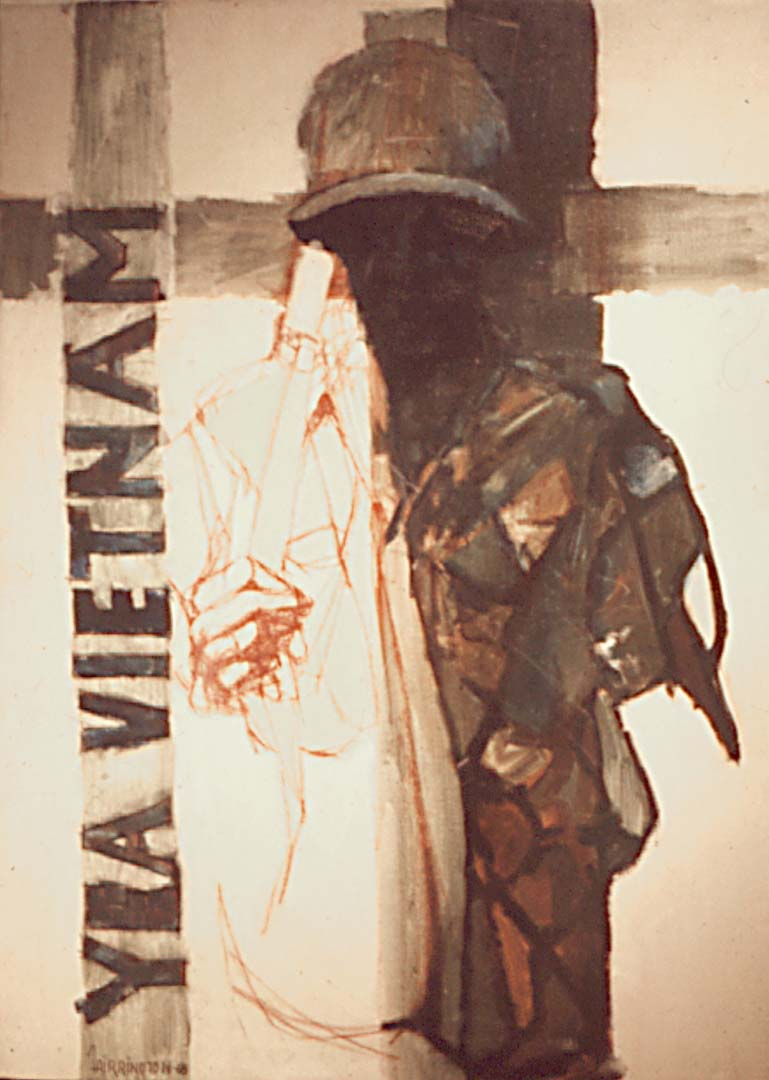
YEA VIETNAM by David N. Fairrington, CAT VI, 1968

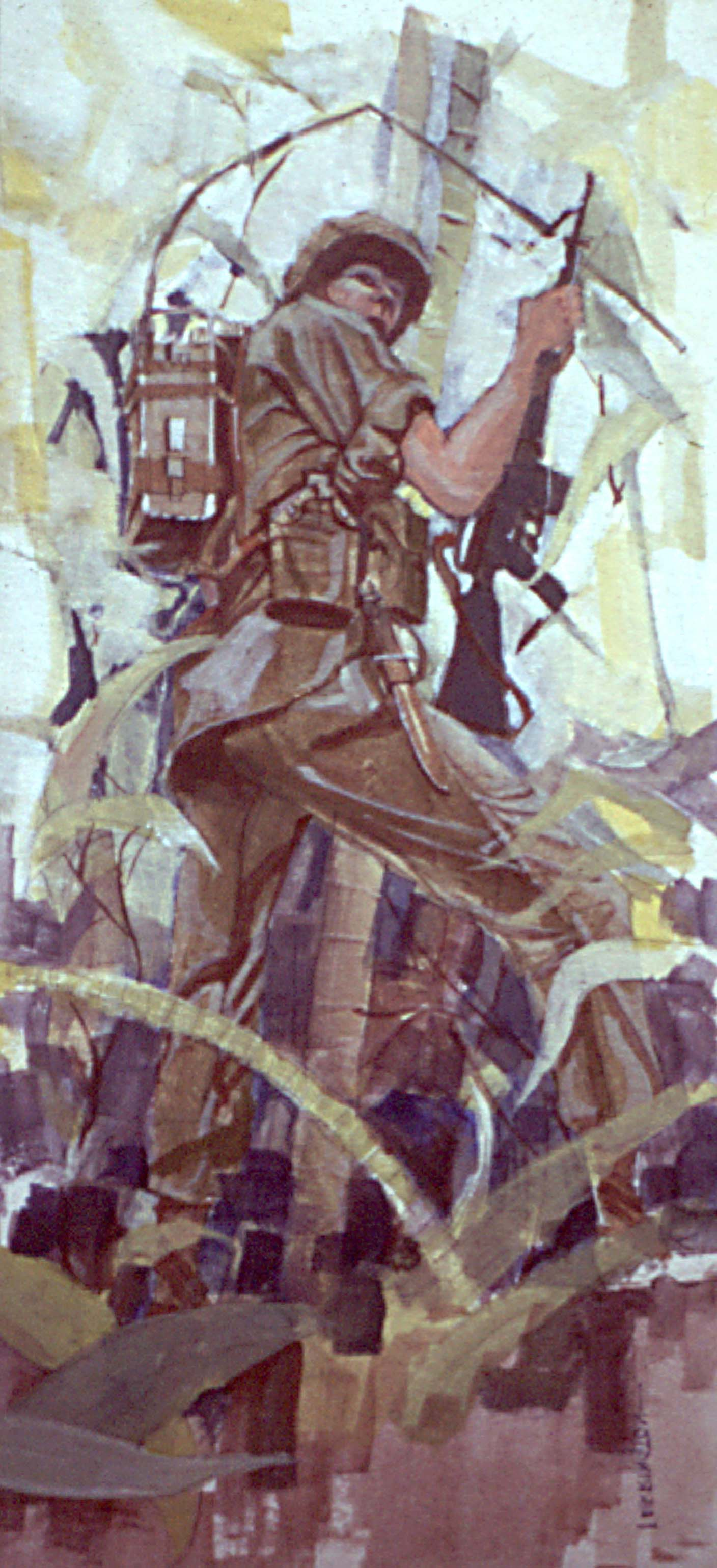
RADIO OPERATOR by David N. Fairrington, CAT VI, 1968
