= John S. Meyer =

American doctor

- Born: 24 February 1924; London, England
- Died: 17 February 2011; Houston, Texas
- Education: Trinity College; Montreal Neurological Institute; McGill University; Yale School of Medicine; Harvard Medical School
- Medical career
- Profession: Physician
- Sub-specialties: Neurology
- Awards: Harold G. Wolff Award (x 3); Mihara International Award for Stroke Research

John Stirling Meyer, M.D. (1924–2011) was an American doctor, known internationally for his work in neurology.

He served in the United States Navy at the Naval Hospital Yokosuka Japan, where he conducted research on head injuries on veterans of World War II and the Korean War. In 1954, he became an instructor at Harvard University, and in 1957, he became the founding professor and Chairman of Neurology at Wayne State University School of Medicine. In 1969, he went to Baylor College of Medicine to serve as the Director of the Neurological Institute. He later became the Chairman of Neurology.

He authored books and many scientific papers, and was involved with many associations, committees and councils related to his field. Among them, he served as the Chairman of the President's Commission on Heart Disease, Cancer and Stroke.

In 1940, he immigrated to the United States.
