= Royal Naval Hospital (disambiguation) =

A Royal Naval Hospital was a hospital operated by the British Royal Navy.

Royal Naval Hospital may also refer to:

== London ==
- Royal Naval Hospital, Greenwich, London
- Royal Naval Hospital, Portland, Dorset
- Royal Naval Hospital, Stonehouse, Plymouth
- Royal Naval Hospital Haslar, Gosport, Hampshire

== Elsewhere ==
- Royal Naval Hospital, Herne Bay, Sydney, Australia
- Royal Naval Hospital (Hong Kong)
- Royal Naval Hospital Gibraltar

== See also ==
- Naval Hospital (disambiguation)
