= Edward-Dean Museum & Gardens =

- Established: 1958
- Location: 9401 Oak Glen Rd; Cherry Valley, California, 92223; United States
- Coordinates: 33.9854°N 116.9708°W
- Type: Decorative arts
- Website: www.edward-deanmuseum.org

The Edward-Dean Museum & Gardens, or EDM, is an historical home on 16 acres that was developed into a museum and gardens by antique dealers Edward Eberle and Dean Stout. They opened the facility to the public in 1958 in Cherry Valley, California. The museum features late 16th to early 19th century European & Asian Decorative arts, and a research library containing 17th, 18th, and 19th century works on a variety of subjects.

The museum and property were deeded to the County of Riverside in 1964, and today it is overseen by the Riverside County Economic Development Agency.

== Noted items in collection ==
- A hand-written account ledger from General George Washington that he kept during the American Revolutionary War.
- A patch box, a box that held artificial beauty marks, that belonged to Marie Antoinette.
