= Cherry Valley, California =

- Census-designated place
- Location in Riverside County and the state of California

- Location in the United States
- Coordinates: 33°58′29″N 116°58′13″W
- Country: United States
- State: California
- County: Riverside

Area
  - Total: 8.02 sq mi (20.77 km^{2})
  - Land: 8.02 sq mi (20.77 km^{2})
  - Water: 0 sq mi (0.00 km^{2}) 0%
- Elevation: 2,820 ft (860 m)

Population (2020)
  - Total: 6,509
  - Density: 811.5/sq mi (313.34/km^{2})
- Time zone: UTC-8 (PST)
  - Summer (DST): UTC-7 (PDT)
- ZIP code: 92223
- Area code: 951
- FIPS code: 06-12916
- GNIS feature IDs: 1660476, 2408019

Cherry Valley is a census-designated place (CDP) in the Inland Empire region of Riverside County, California, United States. The population was 6,509 at the 2020 census, up from 6,362 at the 2010 census. It is situated at the most northwestern point of the San Gorgonio Pass.

The area was planted with many cherry trees, for which Cherry Valley was named. While many of the trees have long since been removed and replaced with homes, a few can still be spotted in backyards throughout the area.

== History ==
In the early 1800s, the area was known as Rancho San Gorgonio, an outpost for the San Gabriel Mission. A large portion of the area was a Spanish Land Grant made to a man by the name of Paulino Weaver. In 1853, Weaver sold some of his land to Dr. Isaac William Smith, who was struck by the land's natural beauty while looking for stray cattle. Dr. Smith purchased a 1,000 acres for $1,000 from Weaver and established Smith Ranch and Highland Springs Ranch & Inn. The original Smith residence stood near where the swimming pool is today. In 1862, Smith's ranch was dubbed "Smith Station" and was made a stagecoach stop. In 1865, a young Wyatt Earp drove the route from San Bernardino to La Paz, Arizona on which Smith Station was a popular stop.

From 1864 to 1866, the route through Highland Springs along the Bradshaw Trail was the single connecting line for passenger, mail and the express travel between Southern California and the eastern regions of the nation. Smith's Station slowly developed into a hotel bustling with traffic. In 1884, the Smith property was purchased by a Los Angeles company that built a three-story hotel on the property called Highland Home. The first cherry trees in the area were planted here, contributing to the name that it is still known by today.

In 1927, Fred and William Hirsch bought the old Smith place, renamed it Highland Springs Resort, and developed it into a health resort. Fred Hirsch himself was made healthy through following the philosophy of Professor Arnold Ehret, who was an early proponent of juice fasting and colon cleansing. The restaurant on the resort was vegetarian and Hirsch grew a lot of the produce served at the restaurant on the property. He also grew his own grapes and operated a small vineyard. The resort became known as "The Last Resort" as many sick people who were not able to get well with traditional methods, were able to recover through Hirsch's health practices while staying at the resort. From 1941 to 1945 there was a large World War 2 medical treatment facility at the site:Cherry Valley Hospital.

== Geography ==
Cherry Valley is located at 33°58′29″N 116°58′13″W (33.974848, -116.970300).

With an elevation of 2,980 feet above sea level, Cherry Valley is at the highest point on the San Gorgonio Pass between San Bernardino and Palm Springs. According to the United States Census Bureau, the CDP has a total area of 8.1 square miles (21 km^{2}), all of it land.

=== Climate ===
According to the Köppen Climate Classification system, Cherry Valley has a hot-summer Mediterranean climate, abbreviated "Csa" on climate maps.

== Demographics ==
Historical population
Census	Pop.	Note	%±
1970	3,165		—
1980	5,012		58.4%
1990	5,945		18.6%
2000	5,891		−0.9%
2010	6,362		8.0%
2020	6,509		2.3%
U.S. Decennial Census; 1860–1870 1880-1890; 1900 1910 1920; 1930 1940 1950; 1960 1970 1980; 1990 2000 2010

Cherry Valley first appeared as an unincorporated place in the 1970 U.S. census; and listed as a census designated place in the 1980 U.S. census.

=== Racial and ethnic composition ===
Cherry Valley CDP, California – Racial and ethnic composition Note: the US Census treats Hispanic/Latino as an ethnic category. This table excludes Latinos from the racial categories and assigns them to a separate category. Hispanics/Latinos may be of any race.
Race / Ethnicity (NH = Non-Hispanic)	Pop 2000	Pop 2010	Pop 2020	% 2000	% 2010	% 2020
White alone (NH)	4,860	4,678	4,360	82.50%	73.53%	66.98%
Black or African American alone (NH)	37	59	99	0.63%	0.93%	1.52%
Native American or Alaska Native alone (NH)	54	75	44	0.92%	1.18%	0.68%
Asian alone (NH)	62	86	146	1.05%	1.35%	2.24%
Native Hawaiian or Pacific Islander alone (NH)	4	4	10	0.07%	0.06%	0.15%
Other race alone (NH)	0	3	21	0.00%	0.05%	0.32%
Mixed race or Multiracial (NH)	86	110	285	1.46%	1.73%	4.38%
Hispanic or Latino (any race)	788	1,347	1,544	13.38%	21.17%	23.72%
Total	5,891	6,362	6,509	100.00%	100.00%	100.00%

=== 2020 census ===
As of the 2020 census, Cherry Valley had a population of 6,509 and a population density of 811.6 inhabitants per square mile (313.4/km^{2}). The median age was 55.1 years. 16.1% of residents were under the age of 18, 6.1% were aged 18 to 24, 18.4% were aged 25 to 44, 27.1% were aged 45 to 64, and 32.4% were 65 years of age or older. For every 100 females, there were 90.5 males, and for every 100 females age 18 and over, there were 89.7 males age 18 and over.

The census reported that 99.0% of the population lived in households, 0.2% lived in non-institutionalized group quarters, and 0.7% were institutionalized. 82.4% of residents lived in urban areas, while 17.6% lived in rural areas.

There were 2,671 households, of which 20.7% had children under the age of 18 living in them. Of all households, 49.9% were married-couple households, 5.1% were cohabiting couple households, 16.8% were households with a male householder and no spouse or partner present, and 28.2% were households with a female householder and no spouse or partner present. About 29.2% of all households were made up of individuals, and 19.3% had someone living alone who was 65 years of age or older. The average household size was 2.41, and there were 1,755 families (65.7% of all households).

There were 2,821 housing units at an average density of 351.7 units per square mile (135.8 units/km^{2}), of which 94.7% were occupied. Of the occupied units, 78.5% were owner-occupied and 21.5% were occupied by renters. 5.3% of housing units were vacant. The homeowner vacancy rate was 2.0% and the rental vacancy rate was 1.4%.

Racial composition as of the 2020 census
Race	Number	Percent
White	4,788	73.6%
Black or African American	106	1.6%
American Indian and Alaska Native	93	1.4%
Asian	150	2.3%
Native Hawaiian and Other Pacific Islander	11	0.2%
Some other race	626	9.6%
Two or more races	735	11.3%

=== Income and poverty ===
In 2023, the US Census Bureau estimated that the median household income was $78,125, and the per capita income was $42,392. About 6.3% of families and 13.9% of the population were below the poverty line.

=== 2010 census ===
At the 2010 census Cherry Valley had a population of 6,362. The population density was 786.7 inhabitants per square mile (303.7/km^{2}). The racial makeup of Cherry Valley was 5,450 (85.7%) White (73.5% Non-Hispanic White), 63 (1.0%) African American, 102 (1.6%) Native American, 87 (1.4%) Asian, 4 (0.1%) Pacific Islander, 451 (7.1%) from other races, and 205 (3.2%) from two or more races. Hispanic or Latino of any race were 1,347 persons (21.2%).

The census reported that 6,203 people (97.5% of the population) lived in households, 98 (1.5%) lived in non-institutionalized group quarters, and 61 (1.0%) were institutionalized.

There were 2,612 households, 540 (20.7%) had children under the age of 18 living in them, 1,375 (52.6%) were opposite-sex married couples living together, 236 (9.0%) had a female householder with no husband present, 98 (3.8%) had a male householder with no wife present. There were 115 (4.4%) unmarried opposite-sex partnerships, and 16 (0.6%) same-sex married couples or partnerships. 769 households (29.4%) were one person and 500 (19.1%) had someone living alone who was 65 or older. The average household size was 2.37. There were 1,709 families (65.4% of households); the average family size was 2.89.

The age distribution was 1,057 people (16.6%) under the age of 18, 448 people (7.0%) aged 18 to 24, 1,039 people (16.3%) aged 25 to 44, 1,967 people (30.9%) aged 45 to 64, and 1,851 people (29.1%) who were 65 or older. The median age was 51.9 years. For every 100 females, there were 90.7 males. For every 100 females age 18 and over, there were 90.0 males.

There were 2,874 housing units at an average density of 355.4 per square mile, of the occupied units 2,098 (80.3%) were owner-occupied and 514 (19.7%) were rented. The homeowner vacancy rate was 4.4%; the rental vacancy rate was 5.5%. Of the population 4,853 people (76.3%) lived in owner-occupied housing units and 1,350 people (21.2%) lived in rental housing units.

According to the 2010 United States Census, Cherry Valley had a median household income of $54,929, with 7.2% of the population living below the federal poverty line.

Cherry Valley unsuccessfully attempted to incorporate into a city in the 1990s and early 2000s.

== Government ==
In the California State Legislature, Cherry Valley is in the 19th senatorial district, represented by Republican Rosilicie Ochoa Bogh, and in the 47th Assembly district, represented by Republican Greg Wallis.

In the United States House of Representatives, Cherry Valley is in California's 41st congressional district, represented by Republican Ken Calvert.

== Infrastructure ==
=== Parks and recreation ===
Parks and recreational activities are provided by the Beaumont-Cherry Valley Recreation and Park District.

=== Points of interest ===
- Edward-Dean Museum & Gardens, features late 16th to early 19th century European & Asian Decorative Arts.

== Education ==
Most of the CDP is in the Beaumont Unified School District while a portion is in Yucaipa-Calimesa Joint Unified School District.
