= Alameda Naval Hospital =

Former Naval Hospital in California

Coordinates: 37.791250°N 122.280856°W

Alameda Naval Hospital was a large US Navy medical treatment facility in Alameda, California on 77 acres (31 ha). The Naval Hospital opened in 1941 to serve World War II troops and their families. The main building was 150,000 square feet with three stories. The hospital was maintained as a state-of-the-art hospital until it closed in 1975. The hospital was near to and supported Naval Air Station Alameda. Alameda Naval Hospital also had a dental unit that operated until closure. By 1960 the hospital was down-sized and used now as a depot to distributing medical supplies and equipment to Navy ships and nearby bases, as the hospital was next to the railroad and truck transportation terminals. Most Navy personnel in need of care were sent to Naval Hospital Oakland starting in 1960. In 1975 the hospital and dental unit closed and only the depot used the building, now called Navy Fleet Industrial Supply Center or Navy FISC Administration Building/Alameda FISC building. The closure of FISC on April 25, 1997, was per Base Realignment and Closure procedures ordered by the US Congress and the United States Department of Defense. The site was abandoned and a March 29, 2009 fire gutted the building and two nearby Army buildings. After the closure the building was used sometimes for urban assault training. Because the building was abandoned for many years it became an Urban legend site. The site of the Alameda Naval Hospital started as a 1930s Army Air Corp base called Benton Field, the land was turned over to the Navy in 1941 for the hospital. The Catellus Development Corporation had planned a development project on the property but canceled. In 2013 Vista Environmental, a hazmat team removed most of the building. On October 19, 2019, the city approved a development plan to use 17 acres (6.9 ha) of the former Naval Hospital land. Catellus Development Corporation has the right now to build on the land. The plan calls for 354 residences, include 30 single-family homes, 93 townhouses, 138 micro townhouses and 96 standard apartments. The new homes are called Bay37 by Pulte Homes.

== See also ==
- California during World War II
- American Theater (1939–1945)
- United States home front during World War II
- Naval Hospital Oakland
