= Long Beach Towne Center =

Shopping district in California

Coordinates: 33.8294°N 118.0867°W

Long Beach Towne Center is a large power center in northeastern Long Beach, California at Carson St. and the I-605, with 1,000,000 square feet (93,000 m^{2}) of retail space on a 100-acre (40 ha) site. It is the largest shopping center in Long Beach.

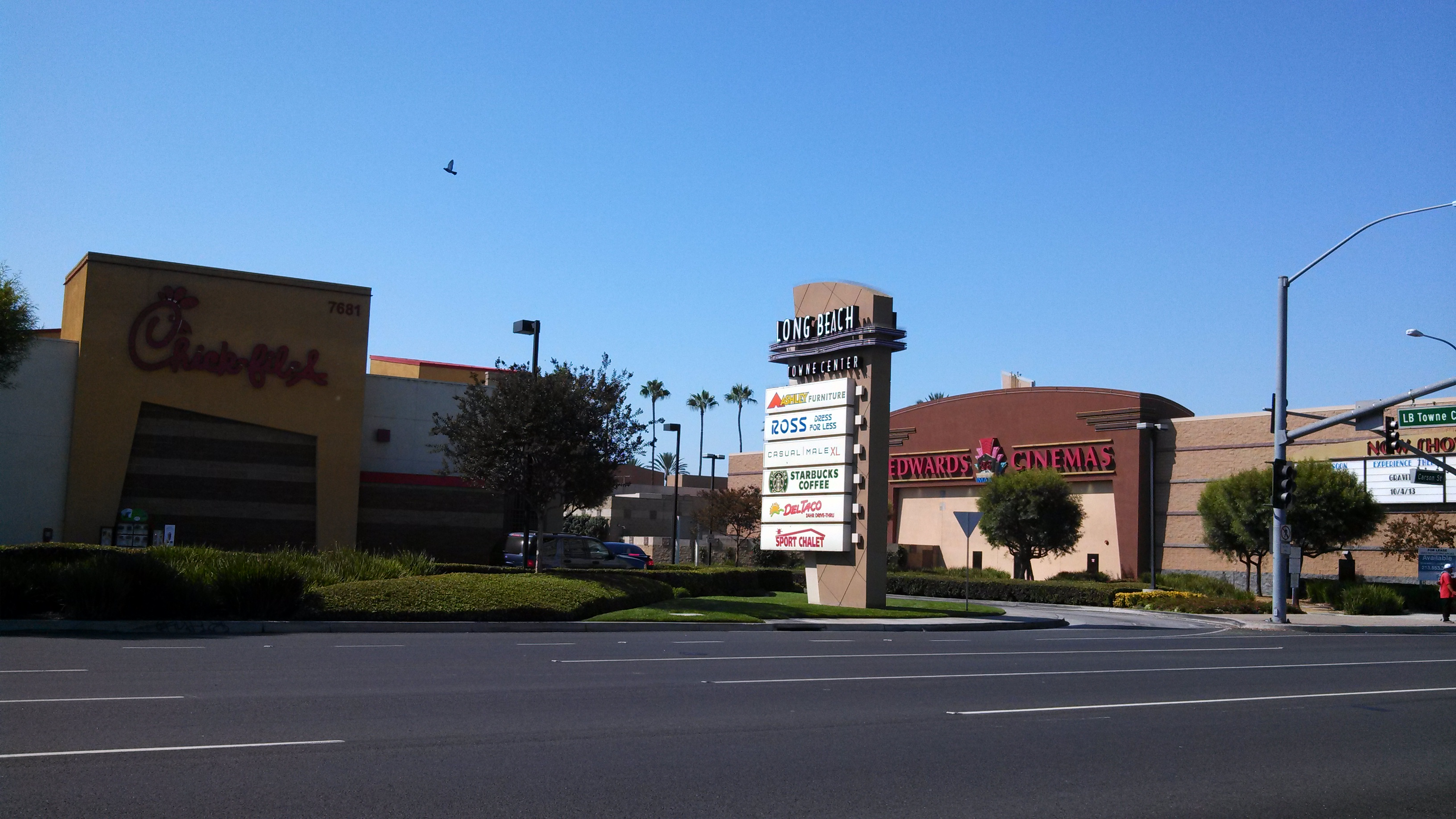
Entrance on Carson Street

== Tenants ==
Tenants include:

- Retail stores: Walmart, Sam's Club, Barnes & Noble, DSW Designer Shoe Warehouse, Ashley Furniture HomeStore, Bob's Discount Furniture, PetSmart, Old Navy, Michaels Stores, IKEA Design Studio, Lowe's
- Restaurants: TGI Fridays, In-N-Out Burger, Chick-fil-A, Lucille's Smokehouse, Original Roadhouse Grill (steakhouse)
- Entertainment: Regal Cinemas, Dave & Buster's

== History ==
The site was empty until 1960, when the United States Navy opened a military hospital on the site. In 1995, operations were transferred to the Veterans Administration, which closed the hospital and moved patients to the VA Long Beach Healthcare System facility near California State University, Long Beach. After disputes with the city of Lakewood over reuse plans, construction began in 1997 and finished in 1999.

In August 2019, the Long Beach Planning Commission approved a plan to demolish about 30,000 square feet of the existing space to make way for a new Dave & Buster's location. In early 2020, the center's food court — which had tenants such as Panda Express, Subway, and Wetzel's Pretzels as tenants at various times — was torn down. It was originally scheduled to open in mid-2020, but work was halted due to the COVID-19 pandemic. Work resumed in the summer of 2021, and the location opened on September 26, 2022.

In 2021, IKEA announced that it would open a smaller-format, 8,000-square-foot (740 m^{2}) "planning studio" stores in the center, which opened in 2022.

CenterCal Properties and DRA Advisors purchased the shopping center for $143 million in 2025.
