= Cherry Valley Hospital =

Former Army and Navy Hospital in California

Coordinates: 33.977024°N 116.985751°W

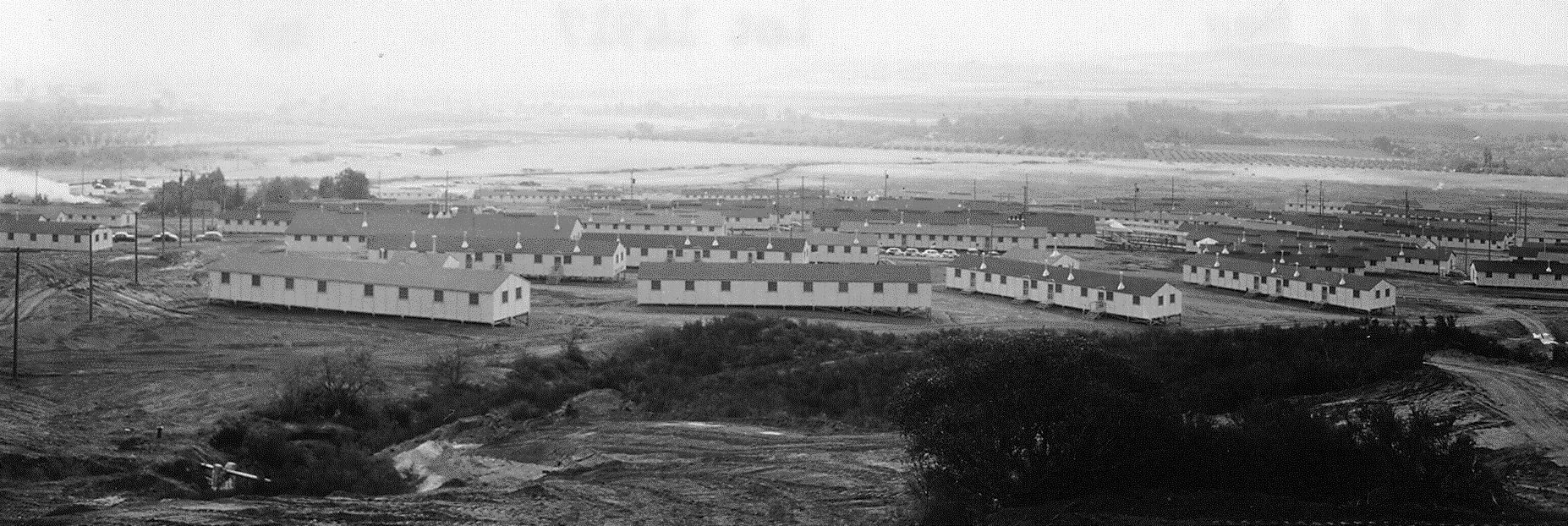
Cherry Valley Hospital in 1942

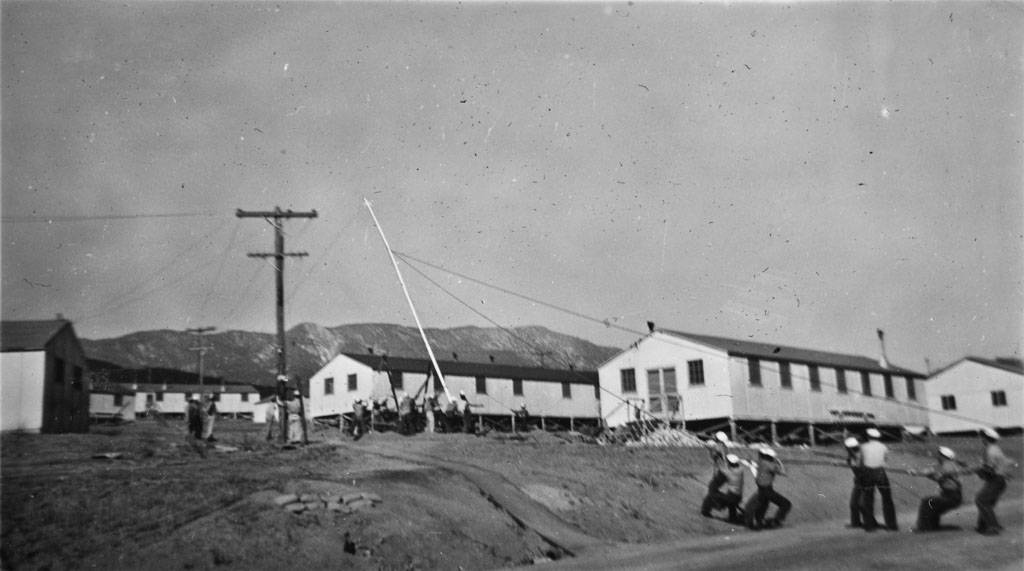
Naval Convalescent Hospital Beaumont in 1943

Cherry Valley Hospital, also called Beaumont General Hospital and then Naval Convalescent Hospital Beaumont was a large medical treatment facility during World War 2 near the City of Beaumont, California in Riverside County. The US Army built a 1,000 bed hospital on the 241-acre site in the spring of 1942. The Hospital had 90 wood buildings, including 34 ward buildings, administrative, water treatment, support and staff quarters. The Hospital was at the base of foothills of the San Bernardino National Forest, 4 miles north of the city. The US Army used the to Hospital to support troops training in the California-Arizona Maneuver Area of the vast Desert Training Center. The vast training center trained US Army and Army Air Forces Troops in 1942 and 1943 to prepare for the North African campaign. The training center started in Pomona, California went eastward almost to Phoenix, Arizona, the south boundary was just outside Yuma, Arizona and north boundary to the southern part of Nevada. At the end of Army training the Cherry Valley Hospital was not needed and on May 26, 1944 the facility was surplus. Cherry Valley Hospital was transferred to the US Navy on July 1, 1944 and renamed Naval Convalescent Hospital Beaumont. The Naval Hospital cared for Troops with convalescent wounds or illness, those recovering from surgery and neuropsychiatric troops who were later discharged. After the war, the Hospital closed on December 31, 1945, all but one building was removed by July 1946. The one building remaining became a hardware store. In 1948 the land was sold by the General Services Administration and developed into residential properties, now in Cherry Valley, California, Cherry Valley Acres.

== See also ==
- California during World War II
- American Theater (1939–1945)
- United States home front during World War II
- DeWitt General Hospital
