= Naval Hospital Bremerton =

- Part of Naval Station Bremerton
- United States
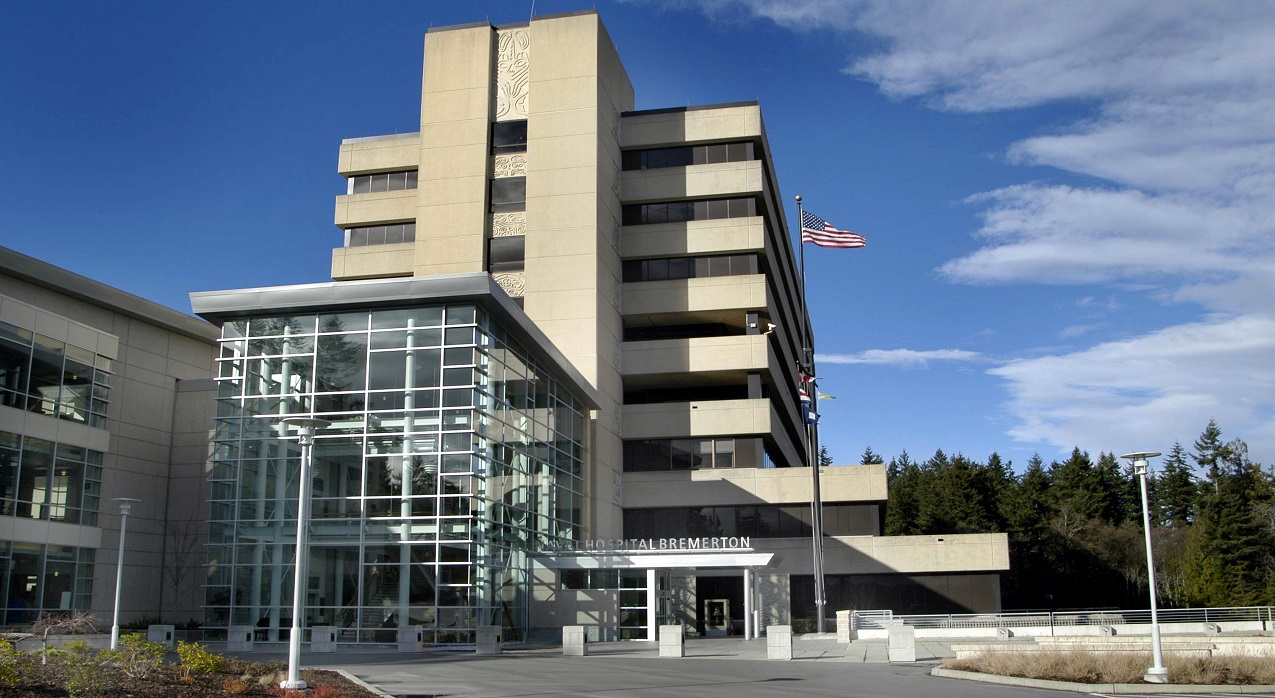

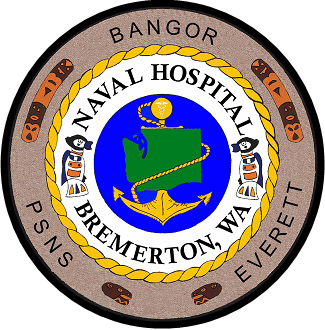

Site information
- Owner: United States Navy

Location
- Coordinates: 47°35′41″N 122°41′30″W

Garrison information
- Current commander: Captain Shannon J. Johnson

The Naval Hospital Bremerton (NHB) is a United States Navy hospital located on Naval Station Bremerton in Bremerton, Washington. Naval Hospital Bremerton is a fully accredited, community-based acute care hospital, currently operating 25 in-patient beds and hosting a variety of ambulatory, acute and specialty clinics.
