= VA Long Beach Healthcare System =

VA Hospital in California

Coordinates: 33.777310°N 118.12177°W

Tibor Rubin VA Medical Center
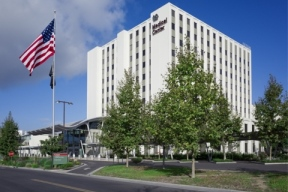

Geography
- Location: 5901 E 7th St, Long Beach, CA 90822-5201, Los Angeles, California, United States

Organization
- Type: Veterans

Links
- Website: www.va.gov/long-beach-health-care/
- Lists: Hospitals in California

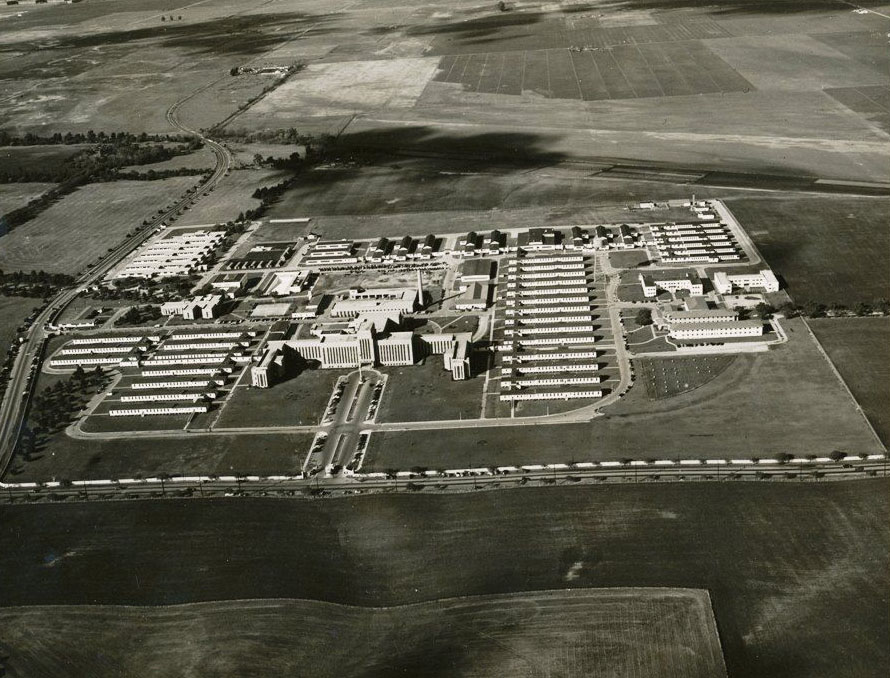
Naval Hospital Long Beach in 1943

VA Long Beach Healthcare System, formerly Naval Hospital Long Beach, is a system of Veterans Administration facilities in Long Beach, California and other nearby cities. The main hospital, the Tibor Rubin VA Medical Center, sits on 100 acres of land at 5901 E 7th St, Long Beach. The healthcare system has primary care, tertiary care, and long-term care in areas of medicine, surgery, psychiatry, physical medicine and rehabilitation, neurology, oncology, dentistry, spinal cord injury, geriatrics, blind rehabilitation and extended care.

The hospital opened in 1942 as a Naval Hospital in 1942 with 300 beds to serve wounded World War 2 servicemen. By the end of the war in 1945, the Naval Hospital had 1800 beds. Naval Hospital Long Beach also served as a major teaching hospital for the US Navy. On June 1, 1950, the Naval Hospital became VA Hospital Long Beach. The Navy purchased the land on September 25, 1941 from the Bixby family of Rancho Los Alamitos.

Congress did not appropriate money for a new Navy hospital until 1960 and provided $9 million to build a 500-bed facility on land sold to the Navy by the city which was located at Carson and the San Gabriel River.

The original site of the Navy hospital constructed at Carson Street and the San Gabriel River is now the Long Beach Towne Center.

== See also ==
- California during World War II
- American Theater (1939–1945)
- United States home front during World War II
- DeWitt General Hospital
- Long Beach Naval Shipyard
