= Naval Hospital Yokosuka Japan =

Japanese military hospital unit

Coordinates: 35°17′11.62″N 139°40′16.7″E

U.S. Naval Hospital Yokosuka, Japan
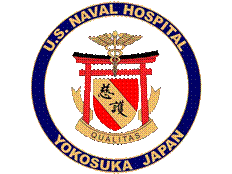
- U.S. Naval Hospital Yokosuka command logo
- Active: September 11, 1950 - present
- Country: Japan
- Allegiance: United States
- Branch: United States Navy
- Type: Hospital
- Part of: Navy Medicine West, Bureau of Medicine and Surgery
- Nickname: USNH Yokosuka
- Motto: Here to SERVE with CARE

Commanders
- Current commander: Captain Carolyn C. Rice, MC, USN

United States Naval Hospital Yokosuka Japan with its eight branch clinics are US Navy medical treatment facilities catering to the medical needs of eligible Sailors, Marines, Soldiers, Airmen, family members, U.S. government employees, retired military service members and other eligible beneficiaries of the Forward Deployed Naval Forces on mainland Japan, Korea and Diego Garcia. The core hospital is located on board Commander Fleet Activities Yokosuka with branch clinics serving Naval Air Facility Atsugi, Combined Arms Training Center Camp Fuji, Commander Fleet Activities Chinhae Korea, Naval Support Activity Diego Garcia, Marine Corps Air Station Iwakuni and Commander Fleet Activities Sasebo.

U.S. Naval Hospital Yokosuka staff is composed of active duty service members, U.S. Civil Servants (USCS), contract employees and Japan Master Labor Contract (MLC) employees.

== History ==
The core hospital (headquarters of U.S. Naval Hospital, Yokosuka) is located on the grounds of the original hospital compound built in 1881 for the Imperial Japanese Navy. Earthquake and fire destroyed those buildings in 1923. The Imperial Japanese Navy rebuilt the hospital in February 1931 as a medical center and training school. At the end of World War II, American Occupational Forces used the facility as a 250-bed hospital dispensary. On September 11, 1950, at the beginning of the Korean War, the hospital was established.

The command received its first Navy Unit Commendation for treatment of over 5,800 casualties from the Korean War. A second Navy Unit Commendation was awarded for services rendered during the Vietnam War. In 1973, the base was revitalized with the arrival of the aircraft carrier USS Midway and the start of the Overseas Family Residency Program. Due to the increased importance of the Middle East and Far East theatres, a new hospital facility was built in 1980 and opened on February 10, 1981.

Shortly before the hospital opened, the command received a Meritorious Unit Commendation Medal for support provided to burn patients from the Marine Corps Training Camp, Camp Fuji, Japan, in October 1979. A second Meritorious Unit Commendation Medal was awarded for superb medical support provided between July 1986 and July 1988. A third Meritorious Unit Commendation Medal was awarded in July 1994 for support provided to victims of an explosion and fire aboard USS Midway in 1990 and victims of the Mt. Pinatubo eruption in the Republic of Philippines in 1991.

In 1999, the Navy Medicine Inspector General recognized USNH Yokosuka as a benchmark command in customer relations and marketing. USNH Yokosuka opened a joint Wellness Center at the Fleet Recreation Center in Yokosuka and the world's first Women, Infants and Children Overseas Office in 2001.

After September 11, 2001 the command reengineered operational readiness training. Throughout 2002, the command strengthened force health protection for the Forward-Deployed Naval Forces and those who support them while simultaneously improving Family Centered Care. In 2003 the command opened a Stork's Nest to assist pregnant women and their families throughout mainland Japan. USNH Yokosuka provided support to USS Kitty Hawk's medical department during and after Operation Iraqi Freedom.

In addition to eligible beneficiaries, U.S. Naval Hospital Yokosuka continues to support Overseas Contingency Operations and humanitarian missions worldwide.

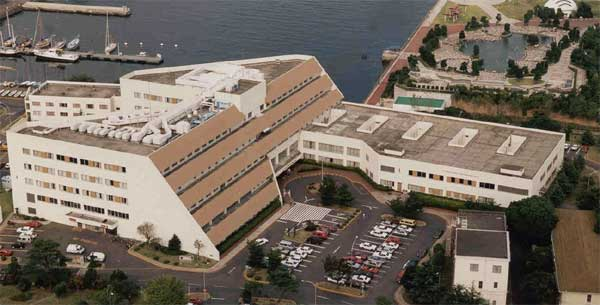
The hospital as it stands today

== Capabilities and Services ==
U.S. Naval Hospital, Yokosuka, provides a comprehensive range of emergency, outpatient and inpatient care services to about 43,000 active duty personnel and authorized beneficiaries. With its regional Educational and Developmental Intervention Services (EDIS), USNH Yokosuka provides care to children with special needs at every military base in mainland Japan.

== Notable personnel ==
- John S. Meyer, physician
