= Naval Hospital Oakland =

Former hospital in California, United States

Coordinates: 37°46′05″N 122°08′46″W

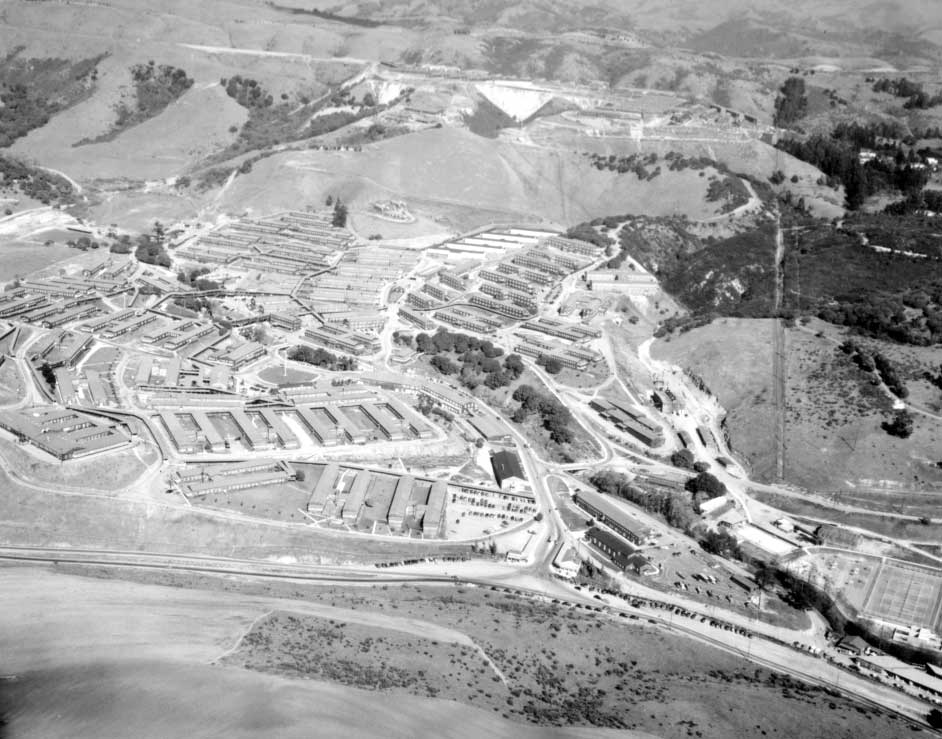
Naval Hospital, Oak Knoll circa 1946

Naval Hospital Oakland, also known as Oak Knoll Naval Hospital, was a U.S. naval hospital located in Oakland, California that opened during World War II (1942) and closed in 1996 as part of the 1993 Base Realignment and Closure program. The 167-acre (68 ha) site is bordered on three sides by Mountain Boulevard and Keller Avenue in the city's Oak Knoll section.

Oak Knoll hospital was built during World War II to treat American military personnel wounded in the Pacific theater. In later years, it also treated those wounded in the Korean and Vietnam wars. The site was previously a golf course and country club that had closed during the Great Depression.

Ground was broken for a new permanent hospital on December 7, 1965; the 597-bed facility was completed by mid-1968 and received its first patients that year. The base was officially closed in 1996 in a Navy ceremony.

The main hospital building was imploded on April 8, 2011.

== Oak Knoll and Lehman Brothers bankruptcies ==
In 2005, a partnership of Lehman Brothers and SunCal (a land developer from Southern California) bought the site for $100 million, planning to build a master-planned community featuring 960 homes, a shopping area, and a 50-acre (20 ha) park. In 2008, SunCal began demolition, but Lehman collapsed in September, cutting off financing for the project. Demolition work stopped for over a year, although SunCal initiated legal action against Lehman in November 2008 to obtain cleanup funds and resolve other issues involving the property.

In October 2009, SunCal secured $550,000 from Lehman, which was used for property-wide weed abatement, cleaning up wood piles, repairing perimeter fences, and providing 24-hour armed security guards to help secure the property from trespassers. In March 2010, SunCal secured a written agreement between the Lehman/SunCal bankruptcy trustee and a remediation firm on a $3.7 million plan to demolish numerous wooden outbuildings throughout the former base; all of these wooden structures have since been removed. The former Club Knoll Officers' Club was spared for future restoration.

In January 2011, the presiding federal judge in Lehman Brothers' bankruptcy approved the release of $1.7 million to complete the major demolition work at Oak Knoll. This allowed demolition of the major concrete and steel buildings to proceed, and the warehouse and the bachelor enlisted quarters have since been removed. The 11-story hospital building, the largest structure on the site, was taken down in the spring of 2011. All structures to be demolished were first cleared of lead and asbestos.

SunCal itself is not in bankruptcy and continues to do business. SunCal still plans to redevelop the property into a master-planned community, but with a new financial partner. However, this is dependent on the outcome of the Lehman Brothers bankruptcy, which continues to proceed through court.

In November 2008, 14 SunCal projects filed for bankruptcy protection following the Lehman Brothers collapse; these were all properties where Lehman was involved. The entity that owns Oak Knoll, SunCal Oak Knoll LLC, filed for Chapter 11 bankruptcy in January 2009. The case is in United States bankruptcy court for the Central District in Santa Ana, CA, case 8:08-bk-17588-ES.

== San Leandro Naval Hospital ==
San Leandro Naval Hospital was built on the rolling hills next to Naval Hospital Oakland to care for troops who needed neuropsychiatric care during World War II. The 500-bed hospital opened on August 15, 1944, and closed on September 1, 1946. Neuropsychiatric care was for what was called shell shock, war neurosis, and combat fatigue, now called Post-traumatic stress disorder (PTSD). The hospital was soon expanded to 1,500 beds. At its closing, it was turned over to Naval Hospital Oakland. In 1951, San Leandro Naval Hospital was reopened for Korean War troop patients. In 1964, the US Navy sold the hospital and its land to a housing developer. The funds from this sale were used to build a modern hospital building at nearby Naval Hospital Oakland. The San Leandro Naval Hospital land is now the Sequoyah Hills housing subdivision.

== See also ==
- Base Realignment and Closure
- Urban Exploration
- California during World War II
