= U.S. Naval Hospital, Subic Bay =

Main medical facility of the U.S. Naval Forces, Philippines

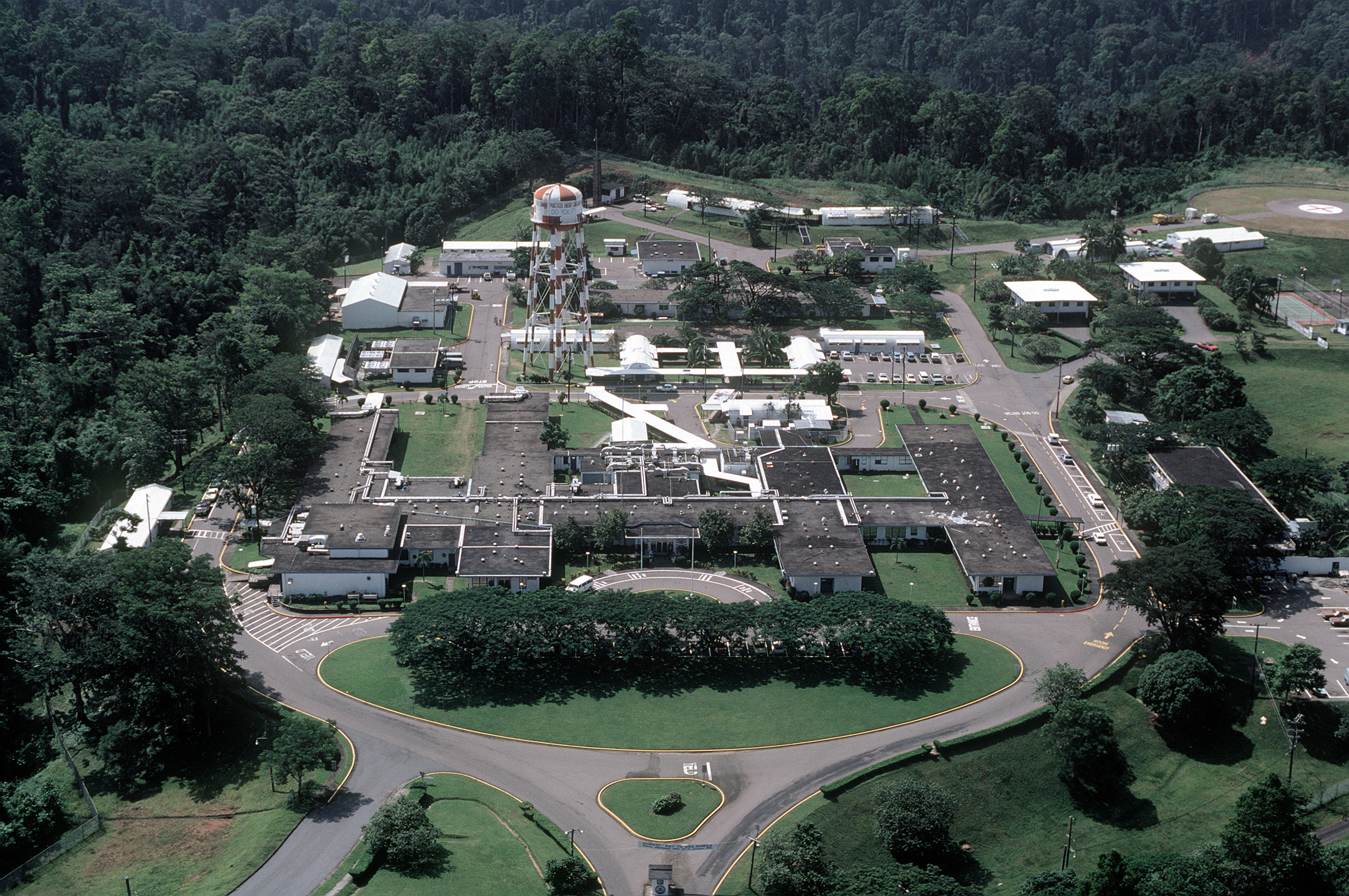
Aerial view of the Naval Regional Medical Center.

U.S. Naval Hospital, Subic Bay (also the Navy Regional Medical Center) was the main medical facility of the U.S. Naval Forces, Philippines. In 1992, after the Philippine government decided not to renew the U.S. bases agreement, the U.S. Naval Base Subic Bay, and the hospital on its grounds, was closed.

== History ==
The U.S. Naval Hospital at Subic Bay was opened on 13 July 1956 as U.S. Naval Station Hospital, Subic Bay. In January 1973, the hospital expanded the scope of its command, adding the dispensaries at Naval Station Subic Bay, Naval Air Station Cubi Point, Naval Communication Transmitting Facility, Capas in Tarlac, Naval Communications Station Philippines San Miguel, and the Joint Military Group Manila. On 7 March 1977, the Hospital was designated as a Regional Medical Center. On 1 August 1983, the Naval Medical Command, Pacific Region, Hawaii became the Subic Bay U.S. Naval Hospital's parent command. In 1989, the Bureau of Medicine and Surgery reorganized, and the hospital began to report directly to the Commander, U.S. Naval Forces, Philippines.

The hospital had 90 beds, with the ability to expand to 141 beds.

The last commanding officer was Captain Vernon M. Peters, MSC, USN. The facility was officially closed in November 1992.
