= Richard C. Vinci =

United States Navy admiral

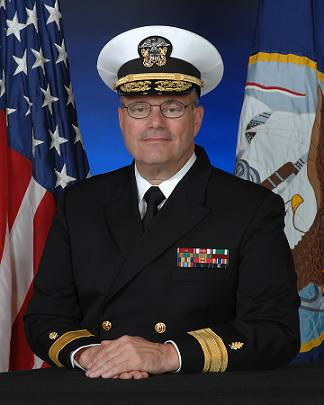
- Born: 1947 (age 78–79); Chicago, Illinois, U.S.
- Military career
- Allegiance: United States of America
- Branch: United States Navy
- Rank: Rear Admiral
- Commands: United States Navy Dental Corps; Navy Medicine Support Command; 1st Dental Battalion; Naval Dental Center, Great Lakes, Illinois
- Awards: Legion of Merit (5); Meritorious Service Medal (3); Navy and Marine Corps Commendation Medal; Navy and Marine Corps Achievement Medal

Richard C. Vinci (born 1947) is a retired United States Navy rear admiral. He served as the 35th Chief of the United States Navy Dental Corps. He retired in July 2011, after 42 years of naval service. Admiral Vinci is a member of the International College of Dentists, Academy of Operative Dentistry, American Dental Association, American Board of Operative Dentistry, and the American College of Dentists.

== Enlisted career and education ==
Born in Chicago, Vinci enlisted in the United States Navy in 1968 as a dental technician. After completing his first tour of duty at Marine Corps Air Station New River, he would be honorably discharged as a petty officer second class.

Vinci attended William Carey University where he was a member of the university's Chi Beta Phi chapter. He graduated in 1973 with a bachelor's degree in chemistry. From there, he enrolled in the Louisiana State University School of Dentistry, graduating in 1977 with a D.D.S.

== Officer career ==
Promotions
Rank	Date
Rear admiral (lower half)	Confirmed by Congress 2007-05-25
Captain	
Commander	
Lieutenant commander	1982-05-01
Lieutenant	1977-05-14

History of Assignments
Assignment	Dates
Deputy Chief for Logistics and Installations, BUMED	2009 – July 2011
Navy Medicine Support Command, Jacksonville, FL	November 2007 – September 2009
Chief, United States Navy Dental Corps	August 2007 – August 2010
Medical Inspector General	December 2006 – November 2007
Deputy, Naval Medical Inspector General, BUMED	January 2005 – December 2006
Naval Dental Center Great Lakes, IL	June 2002 – January 2005
1st Dental Battalion, Camp Pendleton, CA	June 1999 – June 2002
Naval Dental Center, San Diego, CA	June 1996 – June 1999
Branch Dental Clinic, Washington Navy Yard	June 1994 – June 1996
3rd Dental Battalion, Okinawa, Japan	
Naval Dental Center, Orlando, FL	1985–1991
University of Michigan	
Naval Regional Dental Clinic, Pearl Harbor, HI	
USS Bryce Canyon (AD-36)	1979
Naval Regional Dental Center, Jacksonville, FL	1977
Marine Corps Air Station New River	
Naval Dental School, Bethesda MD	April 1968

After graduating, Vinci accepted a commission as a lieutenant in the United States Navy Dental Corps. He completed several tours as a junior officer, and was selected for advanced training at the University of Michigan, graduating with a master's in restorative dentistry in 1985. Following that, he became board certified in February 1990.

After several executive officer and commanding officer tours, Vinci was promoted to rear admiral (lower half), and appointed the 35th Chief of the United States Navy Dental Corps in 2007. While serving as the Corps' chief, in 2008 he was also selected to be a member of the American Dental Education Association's House of Delegates. ^{Note 1}

Vinci passed the office of Chief of the Navy Dental Corps to Admiral Elaine C. Wagner in 2010, and retired from the United States Navy in July 2011.

== After retirement ==
Vinci continued to be involved in dental organizations after his retirement from the Navy, including serving as the president of the Academy of Operative Dentistry, and as a regent at-large for the American College of Dentists.

== Honors, awards, and decorations ==
In addition to his military awards and honors, Vinci was inducted into the Carey University Alumni Hall of Fame in 2011 and was recognized as one of Louisiana State University's alumni of the year in 2017.

== Notes ==
^Note 1: The ADEA House of Delegates is the organization's rule and policy making body.

Military offices
Preceded by Carol I. Turner	Chief, Navy Dental Corps; 2007–2010	Succeeded by Elaine C. Wagner
