= Indiana University School of Dentistry =

Dental school in Indianapolis, Indiana, US

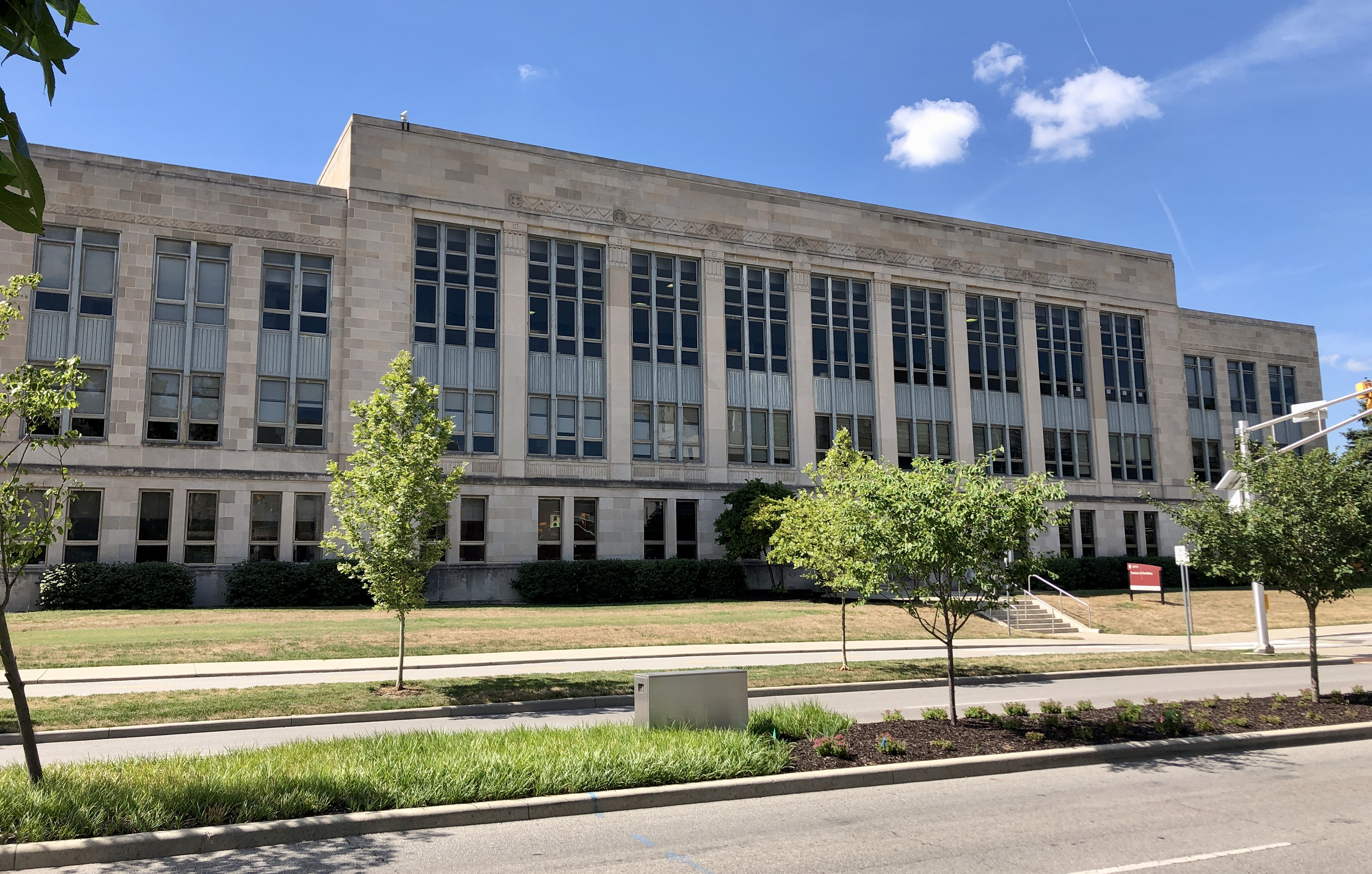
- School of Dentistry building in 2022
- Motto: Always Striving for Simply the Best
- Type: Public, coeducational
- Established: 1879; 147 years ago
- Dean: Carol Anne Murdoch-Kinch
- Students: 655 students in all disciplines
- Location: Indianapolis, Indiana, United States; 39.773962°N 86.180111°W
- Campus: Urban: 512 acres (2.07 km²)
- Website: www.dentistry.iu.edu
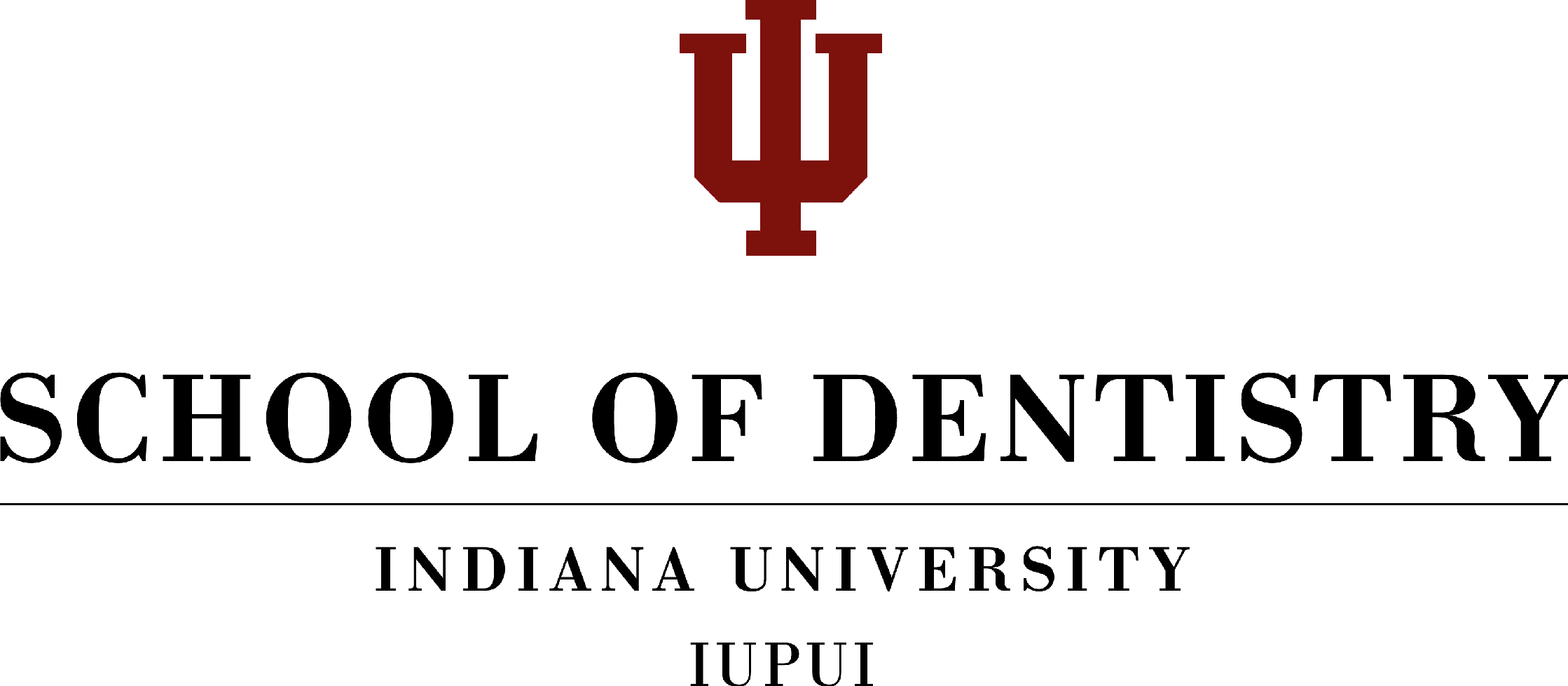

The Indiana University School of Dentistry (IUSD) is the dental school of Indiana University. It is located on the campus of Indiana University Indianapolis in downtown Indianapolis. It is the only dental school in Indiana.

== Details ==
The school was established by the Indiana Dental Association as the Indiana Dental College in 1879. It is located at the center of Indiana, and in the heart of Indianapolis. It is part of Indiana University Indianapolis, one of eight campuses in Indiana University and the premier urban campus of the Indiana University System. The IU Indy campus is situated just a few blocks from Monument Circle in downtown Indianapolis. The school was once part of the 1896 University of Indianapolis, an institution unrelated to the modern university.

IU Indy shares its location on the near west side of the city with the Indiana University Medical Center. Many of the dental school's faculty members have established strong collaborative ties with physicians and other scientists in the medical center facilities, which are just across the street from the school.

During the 2010–11 academic year, 693 students pursued seven types of degree and/or certificate programs in dental assisting, dental hygiene, dentistry, and graduate dentistry. In addition, three other IU campuses (in Gary, South Bend, and Fort Wayne) offer certificates and degrees in allied dental programs. Carol Anne Murdoch-Kinch has been Dean of the school since June 2019.

== Alumni ==
The IU dental school has more than 11,000 living alumni. They are pursuing careers throughout the United States and in more than 30 other countries. The IU Alumni Association counts dentistry among its most supportive groups. IU grads have been named to prestigious leadership posts in organized dentistry and in dental education throughout the world. Alumna Carol I. Turner (DDS'75) was appointed chief of the US Navy Dental Corps in 2003, becoming the first woman to hold the Navy's top position in dentistry; Ronald Zentz (DDS'85) is senior director of the American Dental Association's Council on Scientific Affairs; and Stephen Ralls (M'81 Periodontics) is executive director of the American College of Dentists.

== Cheating episode ==
In May 2007, the School of Dentistry disciplined 46 dental students for cheating. The Indianapolis Star initially reported that nine students were dismissed, 16 were suspended for periods ranging from three to twenty-four months, and 21 received letters of reprimand. However, all of the dismissals were reversed and most of the suspensions decreased after the student appeals were finalized.

The incident "involved the unauthorized acquisition, sharing and use of passwords to enter electronically locked image files meant only for examinations", according to a memo written by Dean Lawrence Goldblatt, which the Indianapolis Star obtained. Dr. Goldblatt's memorandum states that the scandal involved the school's second-year class, the dental class of 2009. The memorandum states that the investigation took approximately two months to complete. According to Dr. Goldblatt, all "[s]tudents receiving any of the sanctions... have the right to appeal the decision to the School of Dentistry Faculty Council Executive Committee... within five working days of their official notice of the sanction."

Twenty-three students challenged the disciplinary determinations made by the Faculty Council at its May 4, 2007, meeting. During the appeal process, the school reversed every dismissal. Hence, no students were dismissed as a result of the scandal. In the final sanctions imposed against the class: 24 students were suspended from three months to twenty-four months, and an additional 18 students received letters of reprimand.

== Notable alumni ==
- Brad Crawford (1955–2023), inductee of the College Football Hall of Fame, dentist
- Gary Dilley (born 1945), medalist in swimming at the 1964 Summer Olympics, orthodontist
- Sidney Clayton Goff (1861–1935), member of the Wisconsin State Assembly
- Steve Green (born 1953), former National Basketball Association (NBA) player, dentist
- Daniel Laskin (1924–2021), oral and maxillofacial surgeon and educator
- Joseph C. Muhler, developer of Crest toothpaste
- Robert M. Ricketts (1920–2003), orthodontist
- Carol I. Turner (born 1947), 34th chief of the United States Navy Dental Corps
- Elaine C. Wagner (born c. 1955), 36th chief of the United States Navy Dental Corps

== See also ==
- American Student Dental Association
