= William Cogan =

William Cogan may refer to:

- William H. F. Cogan (1823–1894), Irish politician
- William N. Cogan (1856–1943), American dentist, educator, and naval officer
