= Georgetown University School of Dentistry =

Defunct dental school in Washington, D.C.

- Seal of Georgetown University
- Type: Private
- Active: 1901–1990
- Parent institution: Georgetown University (School of Medicine until 1951)
- Affiliations: Roman Catholic (Jesuit)
- Location: Washington, D.C., US; 38°54′42.7″N 77°4′37.4″W
- Campus: Urban

The Georgetown University School of Dentistry was the dental school of Georgetown University, located in Washington, D.C. The school was established in 1901 as a department of the School of Medicine and became a standalone school within the university in 1956. In 1987, the school stopped accepting new students and it graduated its last class in 1990.

== History ==
=== Origins ===
The dental program was formed in 1901, during the presidency of Jerome Daugherty, with the acquisition by Georgetown of the Washington Dental College and the Hospital of Oral Surgery on Massachusetts Avenue. The Washington Dental College was incorporated into the School of Medicine as the dental department. There were initially five faculty chairs of: techniques and orthodontia; dental histology and pathology; operative dentistry; oral surgery; and prosthetic dentistry. Dr. William N. Cogan was elected as the school's first dean. In 1920, the first X-ray machine was installed in the dental department.

The dental department was first housed at 920 H Street, Northwest, in an annex to the medical school's building. Two-thirds of the cost of this $5,000 addition was absorbed by the dental faculty while the remaining third was paid by the medical faculty. The department then moved onto the main campus with the completion of the Medical-Dental Building on Reservoir Road in 1930, facilitating growth of both the medical and dental components.

=== Independence ===
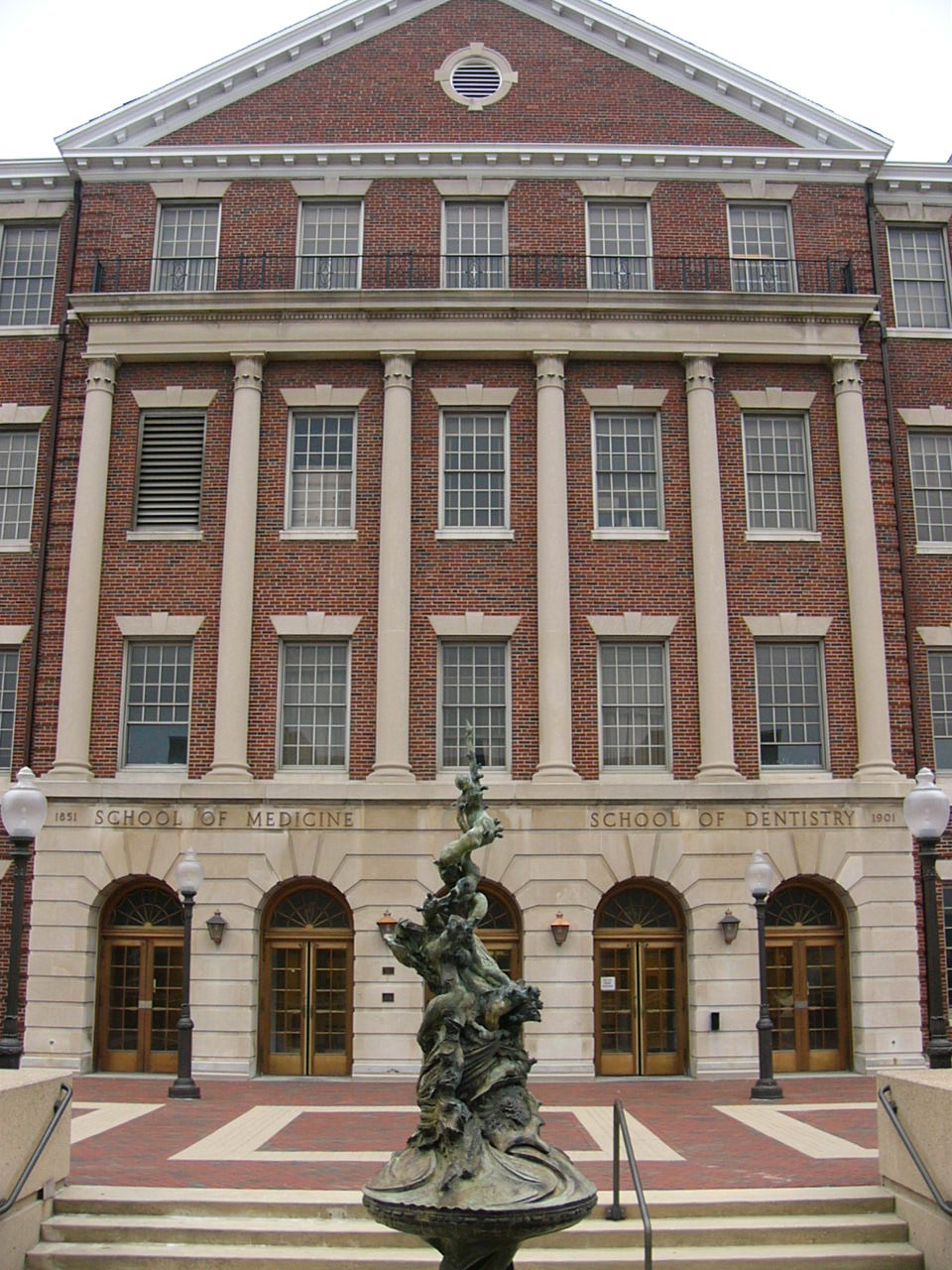
Medical & Dental Building

In the aftermath of the Second World War, the dental department saw rapid growth, with many veterans enrolling under the G.I. Bill.

In 1951, fifty years after the founding of Georgetown's dental program, the School of Dentistry was established as its own school within Georgetown University. A Naval Reserve Dental Unit was created to study dentistry as performed in the United States Navy, the first of its kind in the country. Through the 1960s, the School of Dentistry proactively recruited female students. Women were previously only admitted into the dental hygiene program, which trained them to become dental assistants.

Throughout the 1970s and 1980s, the School of Dentistry operated several clinics that provided free dental care to patients. The Community Dentistry Programs sent dental students into the schools and communities of Washington, D.C. to render dental care. Students could also study abroad in Europe and Latin America to study foreign dental clinical care.

=== Closure ===
By the late 1980s, a variety of factors had forced dental schools across the United States to close, and many others were downsizing. Price Waterhouse determined that by 1992, the Georgetown University School of Dentistry would be operated an annual $3.6 million deficit. A number of causes were put forth, including: a decreased demand for dental care due to advances in technology and the widespread public adoption of fluoridation, an excess in the number of practicing dentists relative to the size of the population, the rising cost of tuition, and increasing numbers of prospective dental students seeking to attend medical school, leading to sharply declining dental school enrollment.

On March 19, 1987, the Georgetown University Board of Directors voted unanimously to cease the operation of the school. At the time, the school had 570 students enrolled. The School of Dentistry was disbanded three years later, graduating its last class in 1990. Students and faculty who were upset that the school did not consult them before making the decision to close filed a lawsuit in the District of Columbia Superior Court. The school's closure also prompted a congressional hearing.

At the time of its closure, the School of Dentistry was the second largest dental school in the United States behind the New York University College of Dentistry. It was also one of only twelve dental schools in the country not to receive federal aid, and had one of the highest costs of tuition at $15,000. In total, the school graduated approximately 4,100 alumni.

== List of deans ==
Deans
No.	Name	Years	Notes	Ref.
1	William N. Cogan	1901–1913		
2	Shirley W. Bowles	1913–1919		
3	Bruce L. Taylor	1919–1922		
4	W. B. Hoofnagle	1922–1926		
5	William N. Cogan	1926–1938		
6	Joseph L. B. Murray	1938–1944		
7	John P. Burke	1944–1950		
8	Clemens V. Rault	1950–1966		
9	Charles B. Murto	1966–1979		
10	David E. Beaudreau	1979–1982		
11	Robert J. Taylor	1982–1983	Acting dean	
12	Stanley P. Hazen	1983–1990		
