= Elaine C. Wagner =

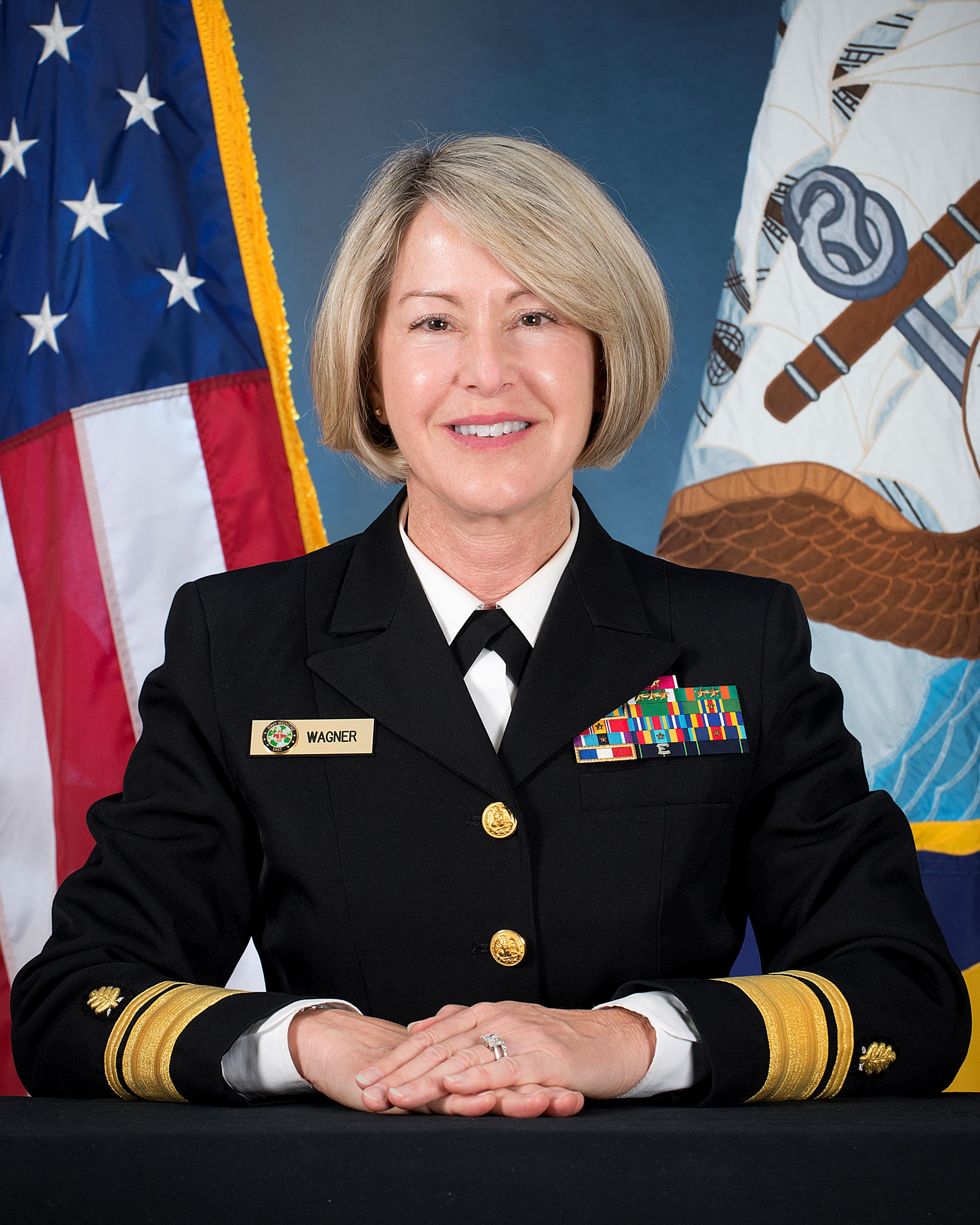
- Born: Elaine C. Campbell
- Spouse: Greg Wagner
- Military career
- Allegiance: United States of America
- Branch: United States Navy
- Service years: 1983–2017
- Rank: Rear Admiral
- Commands: United States Navy Dental Corps; Naval Health Clinic New England; Naval Hospital Beaufort
- Awards: Legion of Merit (4); Meritorious Service Medal (4); Navy and Marine Corps Commendation Medal (4); Navy and Marine Corps Achievement Medal (3)

Elaine C. Wagner is a retired United States Navy rear admiral. She was the first female pediatric dentist to achieve flag rank in the United States Navy, and served as the 36th Chief of the United States Navy Dental Corps. Her retirement ceremony was held on January 9, 2017, and she was transferred to the retired list the following April, after 33 years of service in the United States Navy. She is a member of the International College of Dentists.

== Early life and education ==
Wagner grew up in southern Indiana, and resided in Bloomington prior to attending college. In 1976, she graduated from Butler University in Indianapolis with a joint degree in zoology and chemistry. She was the school's Kappa Kappa Gamma chapter president and registrar. She received her Doctor of Dental Surgery from the Indiana University School of Dentistry in 1980,^{Note 1} and completed her residency at Riley Children's Hospital in 1982. In 1991, Wagner was board certified by the American Board of Pediatric Dentistry.

Following 18 months of private practice, Wagner accepted a commission in the United States Navy in December 1983.

== Military career ==
Promotions
Rank	Date
Rear Admiral	December 6, 2013
Rear Admiral (Lower Half)	January 18, 2011
Captain	Selected June 1998

History of Assignments
Assignment	Dates
Director, Readiness and Health	July 2015
Bureau of Medicine and Surgery	April 2014 – July 2015
Commander, Navy Medicine East	September 2011 – April 2014
Naval Medical Center Portsmouth	September 2011 – April 2014
Tidewater eMSM^{Note 2}	September 2011 – April 2014
Chief, Navy Dental Corps	2010
Director, N931^{Note 3}	2010
Naval Health Clinic New England	2009–2010
Expeditionary Medical Facility Kuwait	April 2008
Naval Hospital Beaufort	June 2006
Naval Hospital Jacksonville	
Naval Medical Center Bethesda	
Branch Dental Clinic WNY	
Deputy Chief, Navy Dental Corps	
Okinawa, Japan	
Naval Postgraduate Dental School	1998
Bureau of Naval Personnel	1995
U.S. Naval Base Subic Bay	July 1990
32nd Street Dental Clinic, San Diego	July 1987
MCAGCC Twentynine Palms	December 1983

Upon accepting her commission, Wagner was assigned to Marine Corps Air Ground Combat Center in Twentynine Palms. From there, she completed several more assignments, including Department Head tours, and tours in the Philippines and Japan. She was selected for an Executive Officer tour to Naval Hospital Jacksonville. In June 1998, she was selected for advancement to captain.

Wagner's first of many tours as a commanding officer was at Naval Hospital Beaufort in 2006. She was the first female to command the station. Following that assignment, Wagner reported to Naval Health Clinic New England as its commanding officer. Within two years of her departure from that command, she would relieve her successor.

In March 2010, Wagner was selected for advancement to the rank of Rear Admiral (Lower Half), and made substantive in that rank the following January. Her advancement to rear admiral marked the first time a female pediatric dentist held flag rank. As a rear admiral, she held many senior leadership positions in the navy, including a tour as the 36th Chief of Naval Dental Corps.

Wagner retired in 2017 as a two star rear admiral.

== After retirement ==
After her retirement from the navy, Wagner accepted a position in the International College of Dentists. And she was also appointed to the BIOLASE board of directors on October 9, 2018.

== Honors, awards, and decorations ==
Over the course of her 33-year career, Wagner received multiple military awards and decorations. In addition to service and unit awards, her personal awards include the Legion of Merit (4 awards), the Meritorious Service Medal (4 awards), the Navy and Marine Corps Commendation Medal (4 awards), and the Navy and Marine Corps Achievement Medal (3 awards).

In addition, Wagner has won several civilian awards in light of her long professional career. She won the Ann Page Griffin Humanitarian Award in 2016 for her "outstanding commitment to alleviating suffering and improving the oral health of under-served populations." In 2014, she received a Doctor of Science, Honoris Causa for her distinguished career in healthcare and service to her nation from Butler University. After receiving the degree, she delivered the university's 2014 Spring commencement address.

Wager was also invited to give the 2012 commencement address at her alma mater, the Indiana University School of Dentistry.

== See also ==
- Women in the United States Navy
- List of female United States military generals and flag officers

== Notes ==
^Note 1: Carol I. Turner, a prior Chief of the United States Navy Dental Corps is also an alumnus of the Indiana University School of Dentistry.
^Note 2: eMSM stands for enhanced Multi-Service Market, and is a geographic region served my multiple medical facilities from different services.
^Note 3: N931 is the office code for Medical Resources Plans and Policy Division, Office of the Chief of Naval Operations.

Military offices
Preceded by Richard C. Vinci	Chief, Navy Dental Corps; 2010–2013	Succeeded by Stephen M. Pachuta
