= Admiral Mack =

Admiral Mack may refer to:

- Cornelius H. Mack (1885–1958), U.S. Navy rear admiral
- Philip Mack (1892–1943), British Royal Navy rear admiral
- William P. Mack (1915–2003), U.S. Navy vice admiral
