= Richard G. Shaffer =

Navy admiral and dentist from the United States

Richard Glenn Shaffer
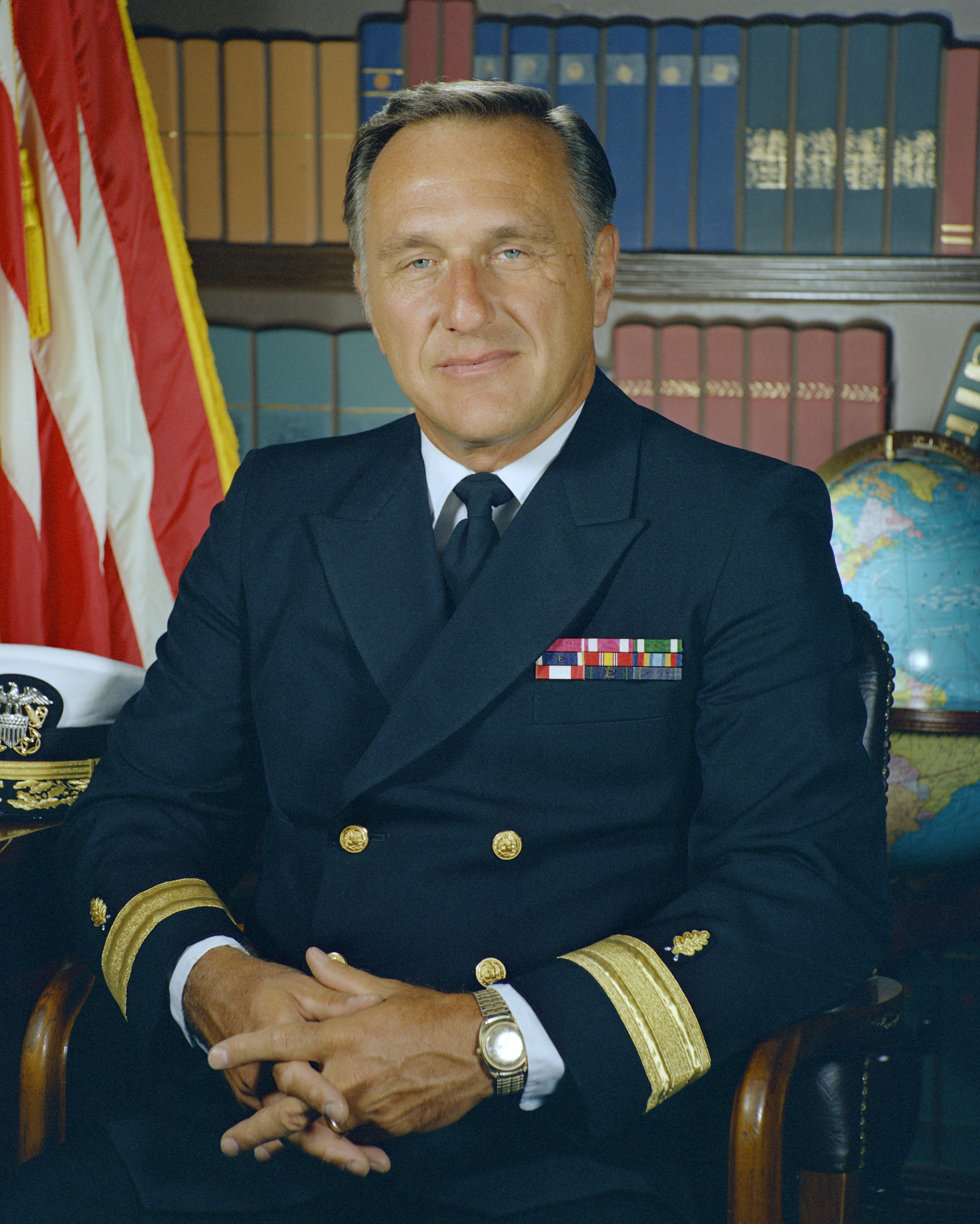
- Born: 27 July 1934; Canton, Ohio, U.S.
- Died: 18 July 2012 (aged 77)
- Burial place: Arlington National Cemetery Arlington, Virginia
- Spouse: Barbara Schneider Shaffer
- Military career
- Allegiance: United States of America
- Branch: United States Navy
- Service years: 1960-1989
- Rank: Rear Admiral
- Commands: United States Navy Dental Corps
- Awards: Distinguished Service Medal; Legion of Merit(3); Meritorious Service Medal; Navy and Marine Corps Commendation Medal
- Other work: Secretary General, International College of Dentists

Richard Glenn Shaffer (27 July 1934 – 18 July 2012) was a rear admiral in the United States Navy and served as the 28th Chief of the United States Navy Dental Corps. He was the first Navy dentist to command a major military medical command.

== Early life and education ==
Richard Glenn Shaffer was born 27 July 1934 in Canton, Ohio. His father, Lee Shaffer, was an electrical engineer commissioned into the Army in 1927. In 1938 Lee Shaffer was called to active duty and received orders to Fort Monmouth. The family moved to Long Branch, New Jersey. After World War II, Richard Shaffer's father retired from the Army and the family moved again to Lakewood, Ohio where Richard Shaffer attended Lakewood High School.

After graduating from high school, Richard Shaffer attended Ohio Wesleyan University, where he majored in chemistry. While there, he participated in the school's Air Force Reserve Officer Training Corps program, including flying and training in the Lockheed T-33. However, he dropped from the program in his senior year. Richard Shaffer also met Barbara, his future spouse, at Ohio Wesleyan. Following his graduation, Richard Shaffer attended the Case Western Reserve School of Dentistry and graduated with a D.D.S in 1960.

== Military career ==
Richard Shaffer joined the Navy Reserve while attending Case Western. After graduating in 1960, he did an internship at the Portsmouth Naval Hospital. Follow on assignments included positions in Panama and Spain. In 1970, Richard Shaffer did his residency at the Naval Dental School. In 1975, he was assigned to be the school's dean. His first Commanding Officer tour followed, at the Naval Regional Dental Center in Great Lakes, Illinois. He was promoted to Commodore in 1983 and was then transferred to Norfolk. His final promotion was to rear admiral in October 1985.

Richard Shaffer was the Chief of the United States Navy Dental Corps from July 1984^{Note 1} to January 1989 He retired from the Navy that same month.

== Later work ==
Following his retirement from the Navy, Richard Shaffer was the Secretary General of the International College of Dentists, USA Section for 10 years, and treasurer for the same for 1 year. He was active in other dental organizations as well. He spent 6 years as a delegate to the American Dental Association, and held fellowships in the Academy of General Dentistry, the American College of Dentists, the International College of Dentists, and the Pierre Fauchard Academy.

Richard Shaffer was Case Western Reserve School of Dentistry's 1988 Alumnus of the Year. In 1998, he received the Ottofy-Okumura Award from the International College of Dentists. He was awarded a Master Fellowship in the International College of Dentists in 2004. Other awards include the Order of Bernardo O'Higgins and the Pierre Fauchard Academy's gold medal.

Richard Shaffer died on 18 July 2012. After his death, the International College of Dentists established a memorial fund in his honor.

== Notes ==
^Note 1: While his 'Distinguished Achievement Citation' from Ohio Wesleyan University claims that Richard G. Shaffer was appointed as Chief of the Dental Corps in September of that year, the 'General/Flag Officer Worldwide Roster' of September 1986 records his appointment date as being in July.

== Additional resources ==
- The International College of Dentists maintains records related to Richard Shaffer.

Military offices
Preceded by Carlton J. McLeod	Chief, Navy Dental Corps; July 1984 – January 1989	Succeeded by Milton C. Clegg
