= Stephen M. Pachuta =

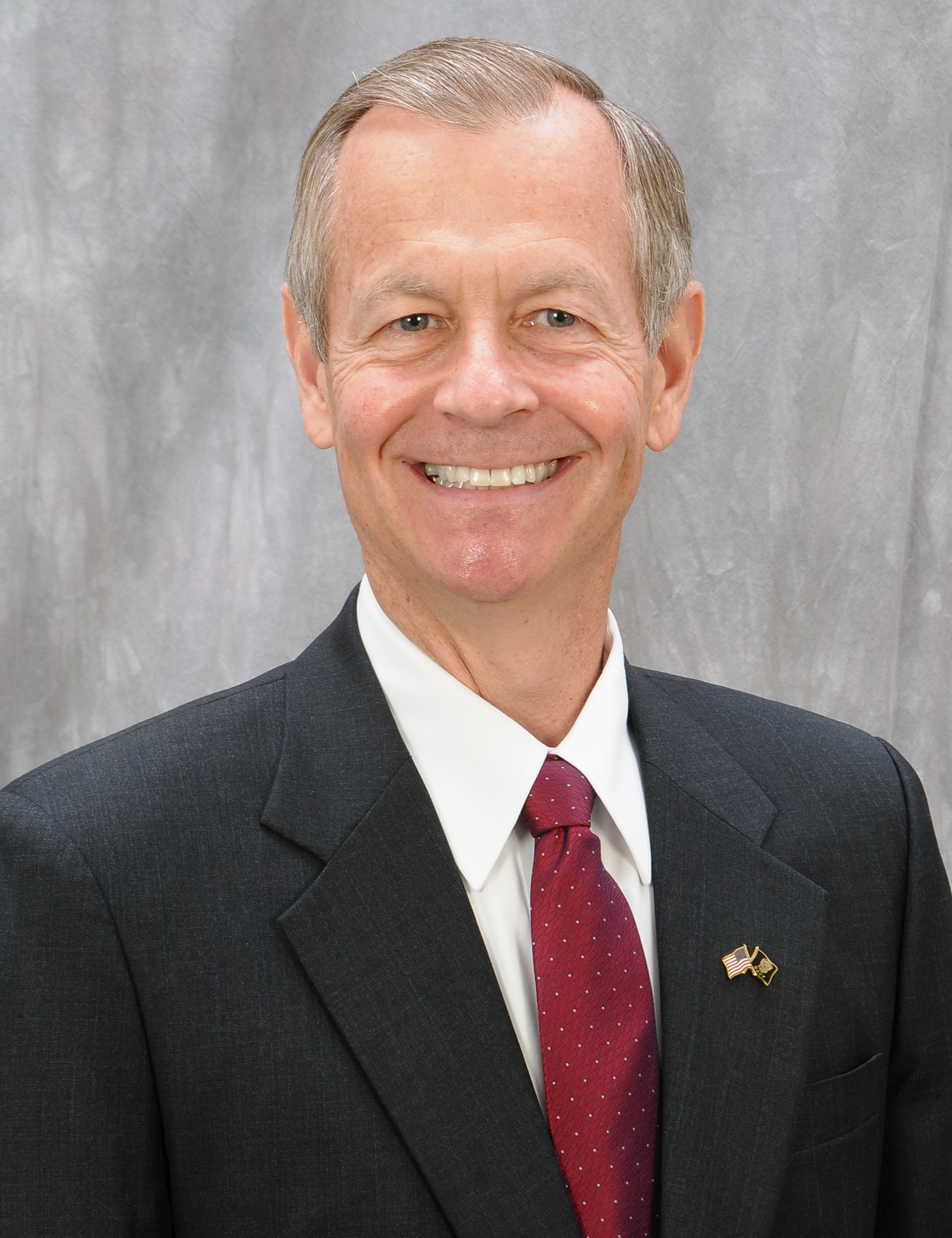
- Dr. Stephen Pachuta became dean of his alma mater in 2021
- Born: 1960 (age 65–66)
- Spouse: Rene Pachuta
- Military career
- Allegiance: United States of America
- Branch: United States Navy
- Rank: Rear Admiral
- Commands: United States Navy Dental Corps; Naval Hospital Yokosuka Japan
- Awards: Legion of Merit (4); Bronze Star Medal; Defense Meritorious Service Medal; Meritorious Service Medal (6); Navy and Marine Corps Commendation Medal (2); Navy and Marine Corps Achievement Medal(2)

Stephen Michael Pachuta (born 1960) is a retired United States Navy rear admiral. He served as the 37th Chief of the United States Navy Dental Corps. Pachuta retired from the Navy in December 2017, after 32 years of military service. He currently serves as Dean of his alma mater, the West Virginia University School of Dentistry.

== Early life and education ==
Stephen Pachuta was raised in Beckley, West Virginia, and attended Woodrow Wilson High School before enrolling at West Virginia University. He earned his D.D.S. from the West Virginia University School of Dentistry in 1985. While enrolled, he earned the Student Award for Clinical Competency and Professionalism.

After he received his commission in the United States Navy, he completed his residency training at the Naval Postgraduate Dental School in 1994, and also earned a Master of Science in Health Sciences from George Washington University.

== Military career ==
Pachuta held several senior healthcare positions in the United States Navy. Most notably, he was the 37th Chief of the United States Navy Dental Corps. He held this position from August 2013 to October 2016. He also held senior leadership positions has the Medical Officer of the Marine Corps, and Director, Marine Corps Health Services.

Pachuta served in Operations Desert Shield, Desert Storm, Desert Fox, Southern Watch and Iraqi Freedom.

== After Retirement ==
Pachuta is a member of the American College of Healthcare Executives, the American Dental Association, the Academy of Operative Dentistry, and the Academy of General Dentistry. He is a fellow of the International College of Dentists and both a fellow and regent in the American College of Dentists. Since June 2021, Pachuta has been serving as Dean of the West Virginia University School of Dentistry.

== Honors, awards, and decorations ==
Stephen Pachuta's military awards include the Legion of Merit, Bronze Star Medal, Defense Meritorious Service Medal, and other lower personal awards as well as unit awards and campaign medals. He is authorized to wear the Fleet Marine Force Officer Insignia as well as the Surface Warfare Medical Department Officer Insignia.

In addition to his military honors, Pachuta has received multiple other awards: In 2011, he was awarded the Federal Health Care Executive Leadership Award For Excellence. In 2015, he was recognized as a Distinguished Alumnus at his alma mater, the West Virginia University School of Dentistry. Additionally, he is also the recipient of the Outstanding Clinical Competency Award, the Restorative Dentistry and Removable Prosthodontics awards, and the Oral Medicine Award.

Military offices
Preceded by Elaine C. Wagner	Chief, Navy Dental Corps; 2013-2016	Succeeded by Gayle D. Shaffer
