= Gugino =

Gugino is a surname. Notable people with the surname include:

- Carl F. Gugino (fl. 1953), American orthodontist
- Carla Gugino (born 1971), American actress
- Tony Gugino (born 1986), American basketball player
