= Clemens V. Rault =

American Rear Admiral

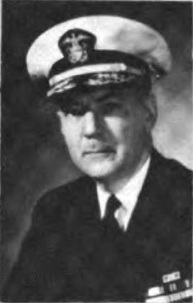
- Born: August 11, 1896; New Orleans, Louisiana, U.S.
- Died: January 29, 1989 (aged 92); New Orleans, Louisiana, U.S.
- Burial place: Greenwood Cemetery
- Military career
- Allegiance: United States of America
- Branch: United States Navy
- Service years: 1918–1950
- Rank: Rear Admiral
- Commands: United States Navy Dental Corps; United States Navy Dental School
- Conflicts: World War I Haitian Campaign; World War II
- Other work: Dean of the Georgetown University School of Dentistry

Clemens Vincent Rault (August 11, 1896 – January 29, 1989) was a rear admiral in the United States Navy and dean of the Georgetown University School of Dentistry. He served as the Chief of the United States Navy Dental Corps twice, from 1932 to 1933 and again from 1948 to 1950.

== Early life and education ==
Clemens Vincent Rault was born in New Orleans, Louisiana, on August 11, 1896, to Sophie (née Umbach) and Joseph Rault. He attended Spring Hill College in Mobile, Alabama, and received his DDS degree from Loyola University New Orleans in 1918.

== Military career ==
History of Assignments
Assignment	Dates
Assistant Chief, BUMED	February 1948- July 1950
Chief, United States Navy Dental Corps	February 1948- July 1950
Naval Dental School	October 1945 - February 1948
Third Naval District	April 1944 - October 1945
New York Navy Yard	May 1939 - April 1944
USS Maryland	March 1939
USS Medusa	
USS Relief	April 1937 -
Northwestern University	September 1936 - April 1937
Bureau of Medicine and Surgery	April 1932 - September 1936
Chief, United States Navy Dental Corps	1932 - 1933
4th Regiment, Marine Expeditionary Forces	January 1932 - April 1932
USS Houston	September 1931
USS Pittsburgh	December 1929 -
Instructor, Naval Medical School	October 1927 - October 1929
Naval Dispensary, Washington DC	February 1926 - October 1927
USS Pittsburgh	May 1924 - February 1926
Navy Yard, Philadelphia	May 1924
1st Brigade, Marine Expeditionary Forces, Haiti	July 1919 - February 1922
Sixth Naval District, Charleston	June 1919
Naval Reserve Forces	Dec 1918 - 23 April 1919

Clemens Rault joined the United States Naval Reserve in December 1918, and transferred to active duty Dental Corps on April 24, 1919. His assignments included Marine Expeditionary Forces in both Haiti and Shanghai, as well as positions on board the USS Pittsburgh, USS Houston, USS Relief, USS Medusa and USS Maryland. He also was assigned to several shore positions, including duty as an instructor at the Naval Medical School. He completed his first of two tours as the Chief of the United States Navy Dental Corps in 1933.

In 1937, he was ordered to the Northwestern University Dental School to complete graduate work. He received a Master of Science in dentistry (M.S.D) from the school the following year. Clemens Rault served in the United States during World War II, first in the New York Navy Yard, and then as the District Dental Officer in the Third Naval District. His final tours of duty were as the commander of the US Naval Dental School, Chief of the United States Navy Dental Corps, and as the Assistant Chief of the Bureau of Medicine and Surgery for Dentistry.

Along with Alfred W. Chandler and Spry O. Claytor, Clemens V. Rault was promoted to rear admiral in 1947, with the date being changed retroactively to be effective on the November 9, 1942. All three would serve as the Chief of the Dental Corps.

Clemens V. Rault retired from the United States Navy on July 1, 1950, after 31 years of naval service.

== Post Military career ==
Clemens V. Rault became the dean of Georgetown University School of Dentistry in 1950, and retired from this position on January 1, 1966. He remained a member of several professional dental organizations including the American Dental Association, the American College of Dentists (he was elected chairman of the organization's Washington section), the International Association of Dental Research, and the International College of Dentists. He also served as President of the American Association of Dental Schools, and was a member of Omicron Kappa Upsilon Society.

In addition to his military awards, Clemens V. Rault received several professional awards in light of his long career in dentistry. He was elected "Dentist of the Year" in 1964 by the District of Columbia Dental Society, received an honorary Doctor of Science degree from Georgetown University in 1959, and another honorary Doctor of Science from New Orleans' Loyola University in 1966. The American Cancer Society awarded him the first annual Harold W. Krogh Award for his efforts at controlling oral cancer. He received the William John Gies award from the American College of Dentists in 1975 for his professional achievements and contributions to dental practices.

Clemens V. Rault died of heart failure on January 29, 1989, at Hôtel-Dieu Hospital in New Orleans. He was interred at Greenwood Cemetery.

Military offices
Preceded by Alfred W. Chandler	Chief, Navy Dental Corps; February 1948-June 1950	Succeeded by Spry O. Claytor
Preceded by Paul G. White	Chief, Navy Dental Corps; 1932-1933	Succeeded by Hary E. Harvey
