= Sidney Clayton Goff =

American politician

Sidney Clayton Goff (January 23, 1861 – May 18, 1935) was a member of the Wisconsin State Assembly.

== Biography ==
Goff was born on January 23, 1861, in East Troy, Wisconsin. His father, Sidney Calkins Goff, was Sheriff of Walworth County, Wisconsin. Goff graduated from what is now the Indiana University School of Dentistry in 1883. On May 27, 1885, he married Jane Priscilla Britton. They had two children.

== Career ==
Goff was a member of the Assembly during the 1911 and 1913 sessions. Other positions he held include Mayor of Elkhorn, Wisconsin, the Elkhorn Common Council, and member of the Walworth County Board of Supervisors. He was a Republican. Goff also served as the postmaster of Elkhorn 1928 to 1933. Goff died on May 18, 1935, from injuries he suffer as a result of an automobile accident.
