= Naval Medical Forces Atlantic =

Flag-level command of the United States Navy

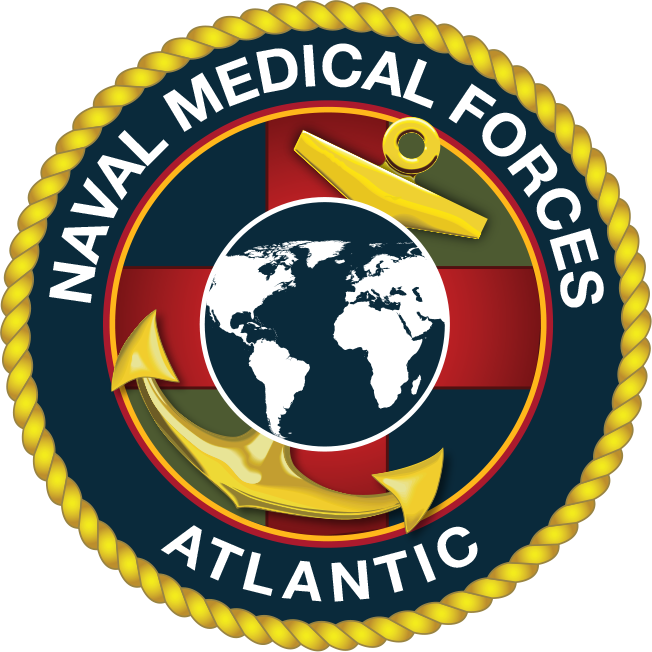
- Founded: August 2005; 19 years ago
- Country: United States of America
- Branch: United States Navy
- Part of: Bureau of Medicine and Surgery

The Naval Medical Forces Atlantic was established August 2005 as Navy Medicine East and is a flag level command reporting directly to the Bureau of Medicine and Surgery. Naval Medical Forces Atlantic is responsible for administrative command over its subordinate commands, and for the provision of health and dental care within its area of responsibility. As of 2017, Navy Medicine East oversees over 100 medical facilities and a staff in excess of 26,000 in the eastern United States as well as overseas.

Despite being located in Maryland, the Naval Medical Research Center has been under the command of Navy Medicine West, not Navy Medicine East, since August 2015.

In February 2019, the Surgeon General of the United States Navy announced plans to rename the command to "Medical Forces Atlantic."

== Subordinate Commands ==
Seal	Name	Location
	Naval Medical Center Portsmouth	Portsmouth, Virginia
	Naval Hospital Beaufort	Beaufort, South Carolina
	Naval Hospital Camp Lejeune,	Camp Lejeune, North Carolina
	Naval Hospital Guantanamo Bay	Guantanamo, Cuba
	Naval Hospital Jacksonville	Jacksonville, Florida
	Naval Hospital Naples	Naples, Italy
	Naval Hospital Pensacola	Pensacola, Florida
	Naval Hospital Rota	Rota, Cádiz, Spain
	Naval Hospital Sigonella	Sigonella, Italy
	Captain James A. Lovell Federal Health Care Center	Great Lakes, Illinois
	Naval Hospital Rota	Rota, Cádiz, Spain
	Naval Health Clinic Charleston	North Charleston, South Carolina
	Naval Health Clinic Cherry Point	Cherry Point, North Carolina
	Naval Health Clinic Corpus Christi	Corpus Christi, Texas
	Naval Health Clinic New England	Newport, Rhode Island
	Naval Health Clinic Patuxent River	Patuxent River, Maryland
	Naval Health Clinic Quantico	Quantico, Virginia
	2nd Dental Battalion	Camp Lejeune, North Carolina
	Naval Health Clinic Annapolis	Annapolis, Maryland
	Naval Health Clinic Charleston	North Charleston, South Carolina

== Commanding Officers ==
Commanding Officers
Name	Photo	Term
Naval Medical Forces Atlantic
RADM Anne M. Swap		2020-Incumbent; First Commanding Officer
Navy Medicine East
RADM Anne M. Swap		2016-2020; Last Commanding Officer
RADM Kenneth J. Iverson		2015-2016
RADM Terry J. Moulton		2014-2015
RADM Elaine C. Wagner		2011-2014
RADM Alton L. Stocks		2010-2011
RADM William R. Kiser		2008-2010
RADM Matthew L. Nathan		2007-
RADM Thomas R. Cullison		2005-2007

== See also ==
- Naval Medical Forces Pacific – Equivalent command for the western United States
