= Alfred W. Chandler =

United States Navy admiral and dentist

Alfred White Chandler
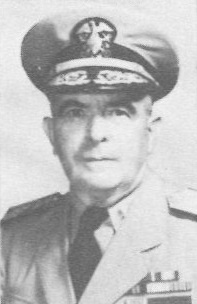
- Born: June 17, 1890; Newport, Rhode Island, US
- Died: September 24, 1978 (aged 88); Chevy Chase, Maryland, US
- Burial place: Arlington National Cemetery
- Military career
- Allegiance: United States of America
- Branch: United States Navy
- Service years: 1917–1952
- Rank: Rear Admiral
- Commands: United States Navy Dental Corps
- Conflicts: World War I Haitian Campaign; World War II; Korean War
- Awards: Legion of Merit

Alfred White Chandler (June 17, 1890 – September 24, 1978) was a Rear Admiral in the United States Navy. He served as the Chief of the United States Navy Dental Corps from 1946 to 1948, and again for a brief period in 1952.

== Early life and education ==
He was born in Newport, Rhode Island on June 17, 1890. His family moved to New Jersey, where he attended Barringer High School and Wenonah Military Academy. Alfred Chandler graduated from the University of Pennsylvania in 1915. He did a brief stint as a dentist at a state hospital and then in private practice before joining the Navy on February 20, 1917, as a Lieutenant Junior Grade.

== Military career ==
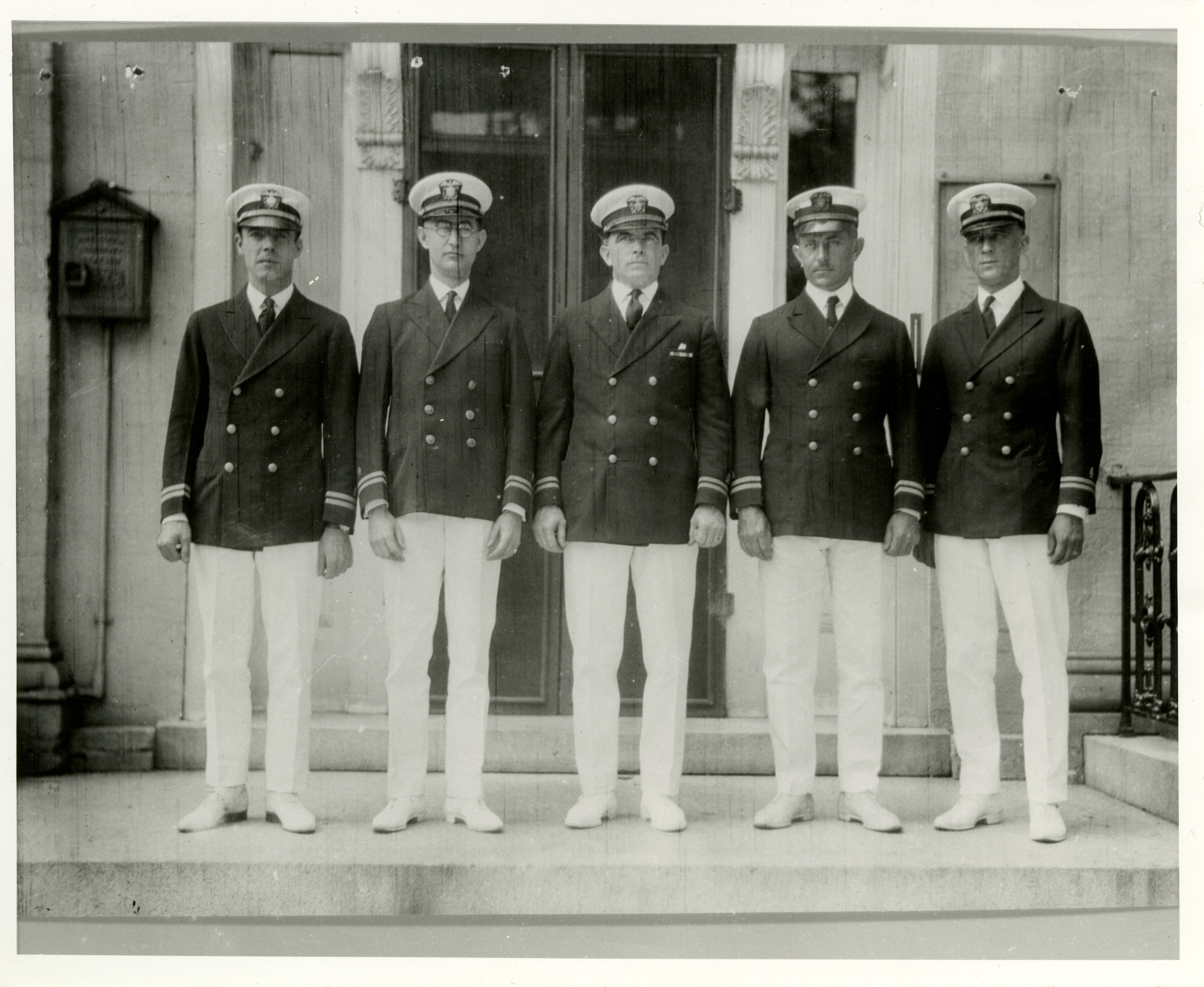
A.W. Chandler, center, with the other members of the Naval Dental School's first postgraduate class. Robert S. Davis, on Chandler's right, would also become a Chief of the Dental Corps.

Alfred Chandler joined the Navy one week after the United States joined World War I in 1917. He attended the first dental officer class at the Naval Dental School in 1923. He was assigned to several commands as Dental Officer, Senior Dental Officer, or Department Head during the period from 1917 to July 1945. From that period until his retirement, he would serve as Inspector of Dental Activities, Chief of Dental Inspections, Chief of the Dental Corps, and Assistant Chief for the Bureau of Medicine and Surgery. He was awarded the Legion of Merit for his services during this period, including making significant improvements to the Dental Corps, establishing the Dental Technician rating, establishing formal schools and training programs for naval dental personnel, regulations permitting staff officers to bear the title "Commanding Officer", and regulations establishing dental departments on board ships and shore stations.

He was the dentist for Presidents Calvin Coolidge, Herbert Hoover, and Franklin D. Roosevelt. Along with Clemens V. Rault and Spry O. Claytor, Alfred W. Chandler was promoted to Rear Admiral in 1947. All three would serve as the Chief of the Dental Corps.

Rear Admiral Chandler retired from the United States Navy in July 1952.

== Post military career ==
He remained active in several dental organizations after retirement. On November 14, 1966, he received the highest award of the American Dental Association for his contributions to the field of dentistry. In 1967, he was elected President of the American Academy of the History of Dentistry. He also received the 1974 Hayden-Harris Award from the American Academy of the History of Dentistry for, among other things, writing and presenting articles and speeches on the history of dentistry, and for his role in getting George Washington's dentures displayed at the Smithsonian's Museum of History and Technology.

Alfred Chandler died on September 24, 1978. He was interred at Arlington National Cemetery.

Military offices
| Preceded by Spry O. Claytor | Chief, Navy Dental Corps; January 1952-February 1952 | Succeeded by Daniel W. Ryan |
| Preceded by Alexander G. Lyle | Chief, Navy Dental Corps; August 1946 - February 1948 | Succeeded by Clemens V. Rault |
