= Carol I. Turner =

American Navy officer

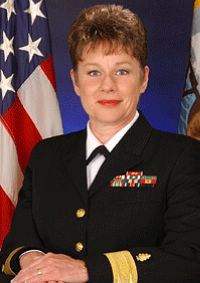
- Rear Admiral Carol I. Turner
- Military career
- Allegiance: United States
- Branch: United States Navy
- Service years: 1977–2008
- Rank: Rear Admiral
- Commands: United States Navy Dental Corps; Naval Medical Education and Training Command; National Naval Dental Center; 1st Dental Battalion, 1st Force Service Support Group
- Awards: Legion of Merit (4); Meritorious Service Medal (3); Navy and Marine Corps Commendation Medal (2); Navy and Marine Corps Achievement Medal

Rear Admiral Carol Irene Baker Turner (born 1947) is a retired United States Navy officer who served as the first female chief of the United States Navy Dental Corps from 2003 to 2007. She also served as the commanding officer of the National Naval Dental Center at Bethesda, Maryland.

== Early life ==
Turner graduated, with distinction, from both Purdue University and Indiana University School of Dentistry (1975)^{Note 1}. Upon completion of dental school, she practiced in Jacksonville, North Carolina, until 1977. In September of that year, she was commissioned as a lieutenant in the Navy Dental Corps.

== Navy career ==
Turner's first duty assignment was at Marine Corps Base, Camp Lejeune, North Carolina. In May 1979, she was transferred to the USS Vulcan, home-ported at Norfolk, Virginia. She served as an assistant dental officer and subsequently as the division officer for the ship's dental department. Turner transferred to Naval Dental Center Norfolk in June 1981.

In 1984, Turner was selected for training and assigned to Naval Postgraduate Dental School, Bethesda, Maryland, where she completed a residency program in advanced clinical dentistry and the requirements for a Master of Arts in oral biology. Her next assignment was as officer-in-charge of Branch Dental Clinic, Bermuda. Turner began a tour as a staff officer under the Chief, Navy Dental Corps, in 1988. During her tour at the Bureau of Medicine and Surgery, she served as head of Manpower Resources and subsequently head of the Logistics Division. In July 1991, she transferred to the Naval War College, Newport, Rhode Island, as a student in the College of Naval Warfare, where she completed a Master of Arts in national security and strategic studies. After graduation, Turner reported to Marine Corps Air Station Cherry Point, North Carolina, as the commanding officer of 12th Dental Company, 2nd Dental Battalion, 2nd Force Service Support Group. In 1994, she assumed duties as the executive officer of Naval Dental Center Newport, Rhode Island.

Turner next reported as commanding officer of the combined command 1st Dental Battalion, 1st Force Service Support Group/Naval Dental Center, Camp Pendleton, Calif. in 1996. She served as officer-in-charge of Naval Healthcare Support Office, Norfolk. In July 2001 she assumed command of the National Naval Dental Center in Bethesda, Maryland. She has served as the deputy chief for dental operations then subsequently health care operations for Navy medicine at the Bureau of Medicine and Surgery, Washington. In June 2005, she assumed duty as the commander of Naval Medical Education and Training Command, Bethesda, Maryland. She also served as the first female chief of the Navy Dental Corps from November 2003 to August 2007. Turner is now serving as commander of Navy Medicine Support Command, Jacksonville, Florida.

Turner maintains membership in the American Dental Association and the Academy of General Dentistry.

== Awards and decorations ==
Turner's personal awards include the Legion of Merit (with three gold stars), Meritorious Service Medal (with two gold stars), Navy and Marine Corps Commendation Medal (with gold star), and the Navy and Marine Corps Achievement Medal.

- Legion of Merit with three Gold Stars
- Meritorious Service Medal with two Gold Stars
- Navy and Marine Corps Commendation Medal with Gold Star
- Navy and Marine Corps Achievement Medal

== Education ==
Turner graduated, with distinction, from both Purdue University and Indiana University School of Dentistry (1975). She was assigned to the Naval Postgraduate Dental School, Bethesda, Maryland., where she completed a residency program in advanced clinical dentistry and the requirements for a Master of Arts in oral biology. In July 1991, she transferred to the Naval War College, Newport, Rhode Island, as a student in the College of Naval Warfare, where she completed a Master of Arts in national security and strategic studies.

== See also ==
- Women in the United States Navy
- Dental Corps (United States Navy)

== Notes ==
^Note 1: Elaine C. Wagner, the 36th Chief of the United States Navy Dental Corps, is also an alumnus of the Indiana University School of Dentistry.

Military offices
Preceded by Dennis D. Woofter	Chief, Navy Dental Corps; 2003–2007	Succeeded by Richard C. Vinci
