= 1st Dental Battalion =

U.S. Navy battalion supporting the U.S. Marine Corps

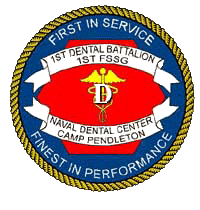
- 1st Dental Battalion's emblem
- Active: 1955- Present
- Country: United States
- Branch: USN & USMC
- Type: Medical
- Role: Ensure dental readiness
- Part of: 1st Marine Logistics Group; I Marine Expeditionary Force (Bureau of Medicine and Surgery)
- Garrison/HQ: Marine Corps Base Camp Pendleton, California
- Motto: "Finest in Performance"
- Engagements: Vietnam War; Operation Iraqi Freedom

Commanders
- Current commander: CAPT Jared A. Geller, USN

The 1st Dental Battalion is a Fleet Marine Force unit of the United States Navy. The battalion includes fifteen dental clinics spread throughout California and Arizona. The unit is based out of Marine Corps Base Camp Pendleton and falls under the command of the 1st Marine Logistics Group and the I Marine Expeditionary Force.

== Mission ==
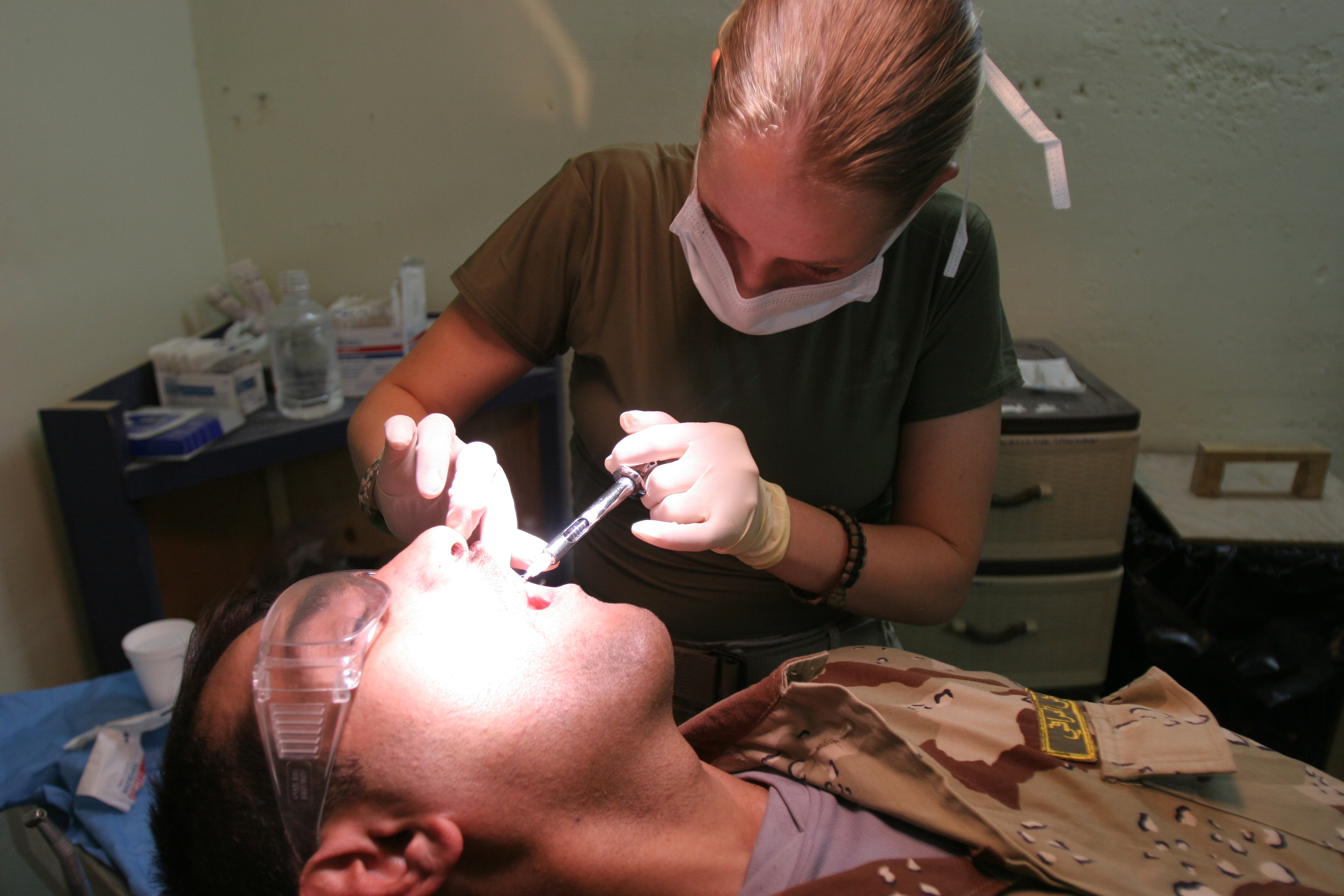
A U.S Navy Hospital Corpsmen assigned the 1st Dental Battalion applying anesthesia to a soldier's mouth.

To provide oral healthcare for war fighters and maintain operational readiness.

== History ==
The 1st Dental Battalion runs 10 dental clinics on MCB Camp Pendleton and also runs clinics at Marine Corps Air Station Yuma, Marine Corps Air Station Miramar, Marine Corps Logistics Base Barstow, Marine Corps Air Ground Combat Center Twentynine Palms, and Mountain Warfare Training Center in Bridgeport, California.

== Personnel ==
- Navy Dental Corps

== See also ==
- History of the United States Marine Corps
- List of United States Marine Corps battalions
- Fleet Marine Force insignia
