= Brad Crawford (American football) =

American football player (1955–2023)

Profile
- Position: Cornerback / Kick returner

Personal information
- Born: December 13, 1955; Logansport, Indiana, U.S.
- Died: May 21, 2023 (aged 67); Winamac, Indiana, U.S.
- Listed height: 5 ft 10 in (1.78 m)
- Listed weight: 175 lb (79 kg)

Career information
- High school: Winamac Community (IN)
- College: Franklin (1974–1977)

Awards and highlights
- NAIA Hall of Fame (1986)
- College Football Hall of Fame

Bradley Neal Crawford (December 13, 1955 – May 21, 2023) was an American gridiron football player and dentist.

== Biography ==
Crawford attended high school in Winamac, Indiana, where be competed in football, baseball, and track and field, graduating in 1974. He initially planned to attend Purdue University and study biochemistry. His older brother, Keven, encourage him to attend Franklin College in Indiana, which offered the younger Crawford a track scholarship.

Crawford then played college football for the Franklin Grizzlies for the 1974 through 1977 seasons. A defensive back, he set single-season and career interception records—9 and 25, respectively—for Franklin; these records still stood as of 2013. He was recognized three times as a All-American defensive back within National Association of Intercollegiate Athletics (NAIA) Division II schools, becoming the first football player at Franklin to earn first-team honors, achieved during his sophomore season. During his junior season, he had four interceptions in a game against Saint Joseph's College of Indiana. Also a return specialist, he averaged 20.3 yards per return for his college career and had a 97-yard kickoff return during his senior season.

Crawford also competed in track and field for Franklin, as a sprinter and in the long jump. At the time he graduated from Franklin, he held the school's record in the long jump at 22 feet 10 3/4 inches (6.979 m).

After graduating from Franklin in 1978, Crawford earned a medical degree from the Indiana University School of Dentistry in 1982. He then worked as a dentist in Winamac.

Crawford was inducted to the NAIA Hall of Fame in 1986, Franklin College's athletic hall of fame in 1989, and the College Football Hall of Fame in 2000. In 2013, USA Football News initiated the Brad Crawford Defensive Back of the Year Award, awarded annually to a player in the NAIA or NCAA outside of Division I FBS.

Crawford died in May 2023 at the age of 67.
