= University at Buffalo School of Dental Medicine =

Dentistry school in Buffalo, New York, US

Coordinates: 42°57′16″N 78°49′3″W

- Type: Public university
- Established: 1892
- Dean: Joseph J. Zambon
- Location: Buffalo, NY, U.S.
- Website: dental.buffalo.edu

University at Buffalo School of Dental Medicine is a school of dentistry located on the campus of the University at Buffalo in the United States city of Buffalo. The school is one of only two public dental schools in the state of New York along with the State University of New York at Stony Brook School of Dental Medicine.

== History ==
The University at Buffalo School of Dental Medicine is a part of State University of New York. The school was established in 1892.

The Academic Ranking of World Universities (ARWU) ranked the UB dental school #10 in nation and #11 in the world in dentistry and oral sciences.

== Departments ==
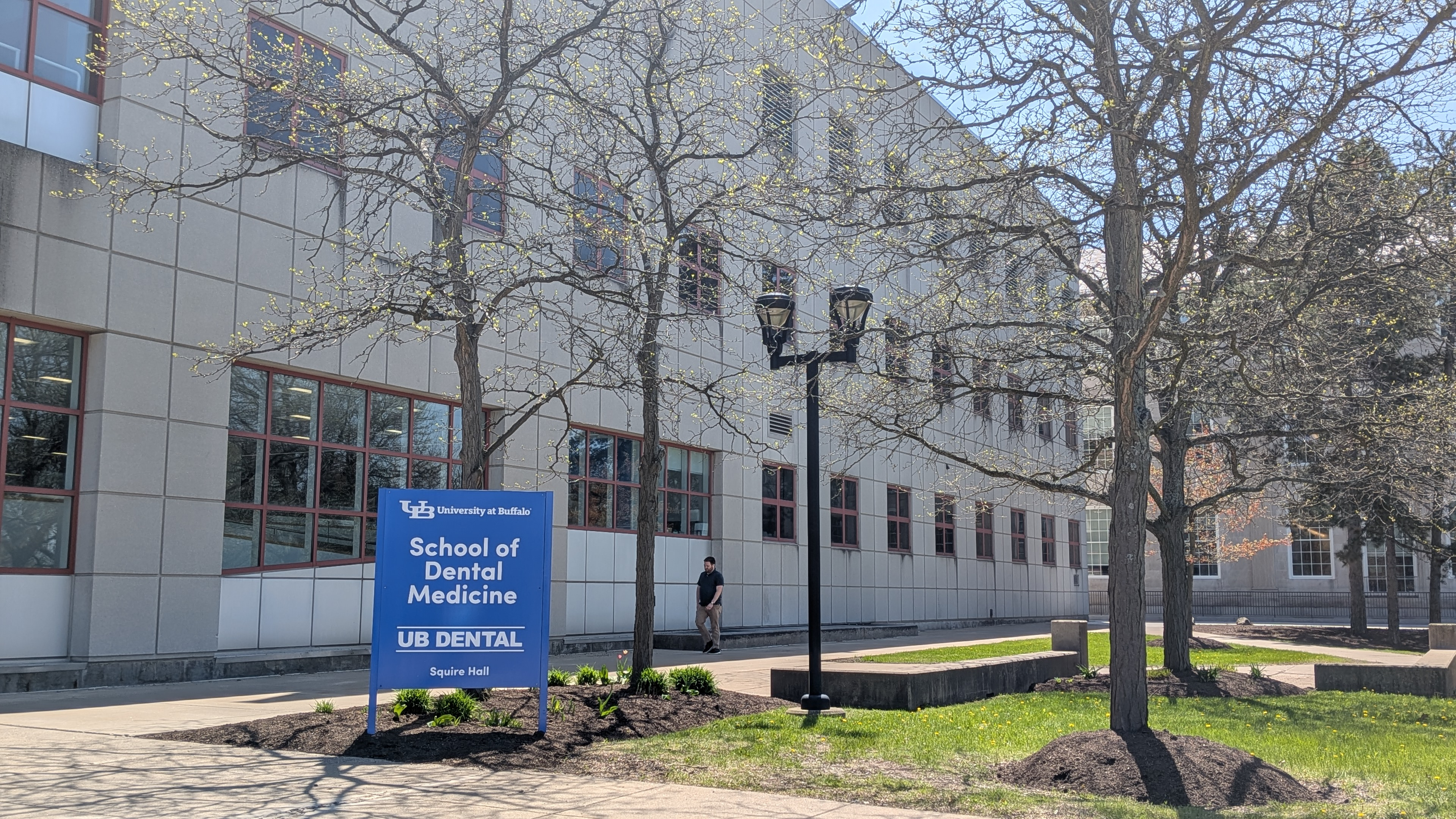
The exterior to Squire Hall, the home to the School of Dental Medicine

State University of New York at Buffalo School of Dental Medicine includes the following departments:

- Department of Oral and Maxillofacial Surgery
- Department of Oral Biology
- Department of Oral Diagnostic Sciences
- Department of Orthodontics
- Department of Pediatric and Community Dentistry
- Department of Periodontics and Endodontics
- Department of Restorative Dentistry

== Accreditation ==
State University of New York at Buffalo School of Dental Medicine is currently accredited by American Dental Association.

== Notable alumni ==
- Carl F. Gugino fl. 1950s-2010s, orthodontist
- Fred Isabella (1917–2007), dentist and member of the New York State Senate

== See also ==
- American Student Dental Association
