= Shanna Woyak =

U.S. Air Force general

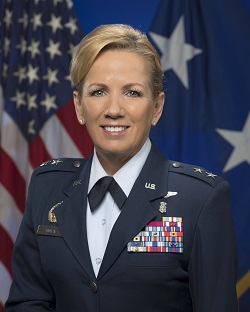
- Official portrait, 2021
- Military career
- Allegiance: United States
- Branch: United States Air Force
- Service years: 1995–2022
- Rank: Major General
- Commands: Small Market and Stand Alone Medical Treatment Facility Organization; 152nd Medical Group
- Conflicts: Iraq War
- Awards: Defense Superior Service Medal; Legion of Merit

Shanna M. Woyak is a retired United States Air Force major general who has served as the Director of the Small Market and Stand Alone Medical Treatment Facility Organization of the Defense Health Agency from 2021 to 2022. Previously, she was the Director of the National Capital Medical Directorate from October 10, 2019, to July 2, 2020.

Military offices
Preceded by Theresa B. Prince	Air National Guard Assistant to the Chief of the Nurse Corps of the United States Air Force; 2018–2019	Succeeded by ???
Preceded by Anita L. Fligge; Acting	Director of the National Capital Medical Directorate; 2019–2020	Succeeded by Anne Swap
New office	Director of the Small Market and Stand Alone Medical Treatment Facility Organization of the Defense Health Agency; 2021–2022	Succeeded by E. Darrin Cox
