= Naval Health Clinic New England =

- Part of Navy Medicine East
- Newport, Rhode Island
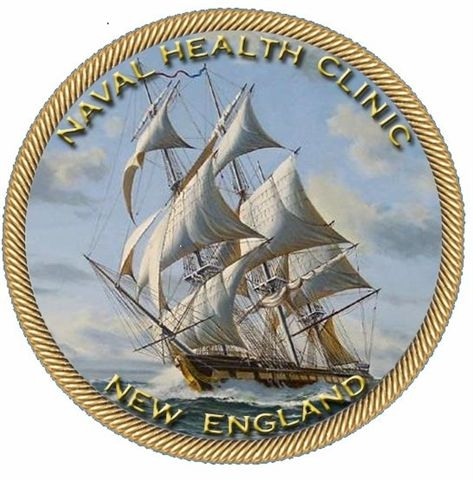

Site information
- Type: Military medical facility
- Owner: United States Navy

Location
- Coordinates: 41.50461°N 71.32156°W

Naval Health Clinic New England is a medical clinic providing health care for the Navy that serves in the Northeast region. It is a part of Naval Station Newport. The clinic provides medical care to 70,000 beneficiaries. Despite the name, Naval Health Clinic New England should not be confused with a branch clinic. The command reports directly to Navy Medicine East, and itself maintains branch locations at Naval Submarine Base New London in Groton, Connecticut, NSF Saratoga Springs, and in Kittery, Maine.

== History ==
Prior Commanding Officers
Name	Photo	Term
Naval Heath Clinic New England
CAPT Marnie S. Buchanan		2018-Incumbent
CAPT Phillip M. Sanchez		2016-2018
CAPT Maureen M. Pennington		2014-2016
CAPT Tina A. Davidson		2012 - 2014
CAPT S. L. Hartzell (Acting)		April 2012
CAPT Marcia Lyons		2010-2012
CAPT Elaine C. Wagner		2009-2010
CAPT D. Elizabeth Nelson		-2009
Naval Health Care New England
RADM J. Philip Van Landingham		1998 (First Commanding Officer)
Newport Naval Hospital
RADM J. Philip Van Landingham		1998 (Last Commanding Officer)

=== Pre-naval hospital ===
The first Naval facility in Newport was the Naval Academy which relocated from Annapolis for the duration of the Civil War. The Naval Academy would return to Annapolis in 1865. In 1869, the Navy opened the Goat Island Torpedo Station. Medical care for sailors in the Newport area was initially provided by the Newport Hospital which opened in 1873. With the opening of the Naval Training Center in 1883, the spread of disease among the sailors became a significant issue. A temporary wooden hospital was constructed in 1896, with the Navy purchasing 13 acres for use as hospital site in 1910. The new Naval Hospital Newport was dedicated in 1913.

=== Naval Hospital Newport ===
In 1918, during World War I, the hospital expanded in size from 100 beds to 1000 beds, and increased its Nurse Corps staff from 15 to 62. Nurses received training at the hospital prior to deployment. Additionally, lessons in French were offered. An old cruiser, USS Newark, was used as an annex and quarantine hulk at the hospital for some time.

In 1991, rather than renovate the now 78 year old hospital building, the Navy decided to move inpatient care to civilian hospitals in Newport. Naval Hospital Newport was used until 1997. Following that, the clinics were moved to the current medical campus directly north of the old hospital. In February 2010, the Department of Defense declared the hospital site to be surplus. On September 28, 2016, the City council of Newport, RI voted to re-purpose the waterfront land at the Naval Hospital site as a public park.

=== Naval Health Care New England ===
In March 1998, Naval Hospital Groton, Naval Hospital Newport, and Naval Medical Clinic Portsmouth were joined into a single command, Naval Health Care New England. The consolidated command's first Commanding Officer would be J. Philip Van Landingham, who had been Naval Hospital's last commanding officer. Sometime after that, the command's name was changed to Naval Health Clinic New England.

=== Naval Health Clinic New England ===
In 2009, Captain Elaine C. Wagner assumed command of Naval Health Clinic New England. She would become the first female pediatric dentist to be appointed Rear Admiral (Upper Half).

In 2010, Captain Marcia Lyons would assume command of Naval Health Clinic New England from Wagner, only to be relieved of duty by her in 2012. Captain Tina Davidson would assume command following Lyons.

In 2020, Naval Health Clinic New England stopped supporting military families and dependents due to reductions caused by the National Defense Authorization Act (NDAA) 2017.
