= Anne Swap =

U.S. Navy admiral

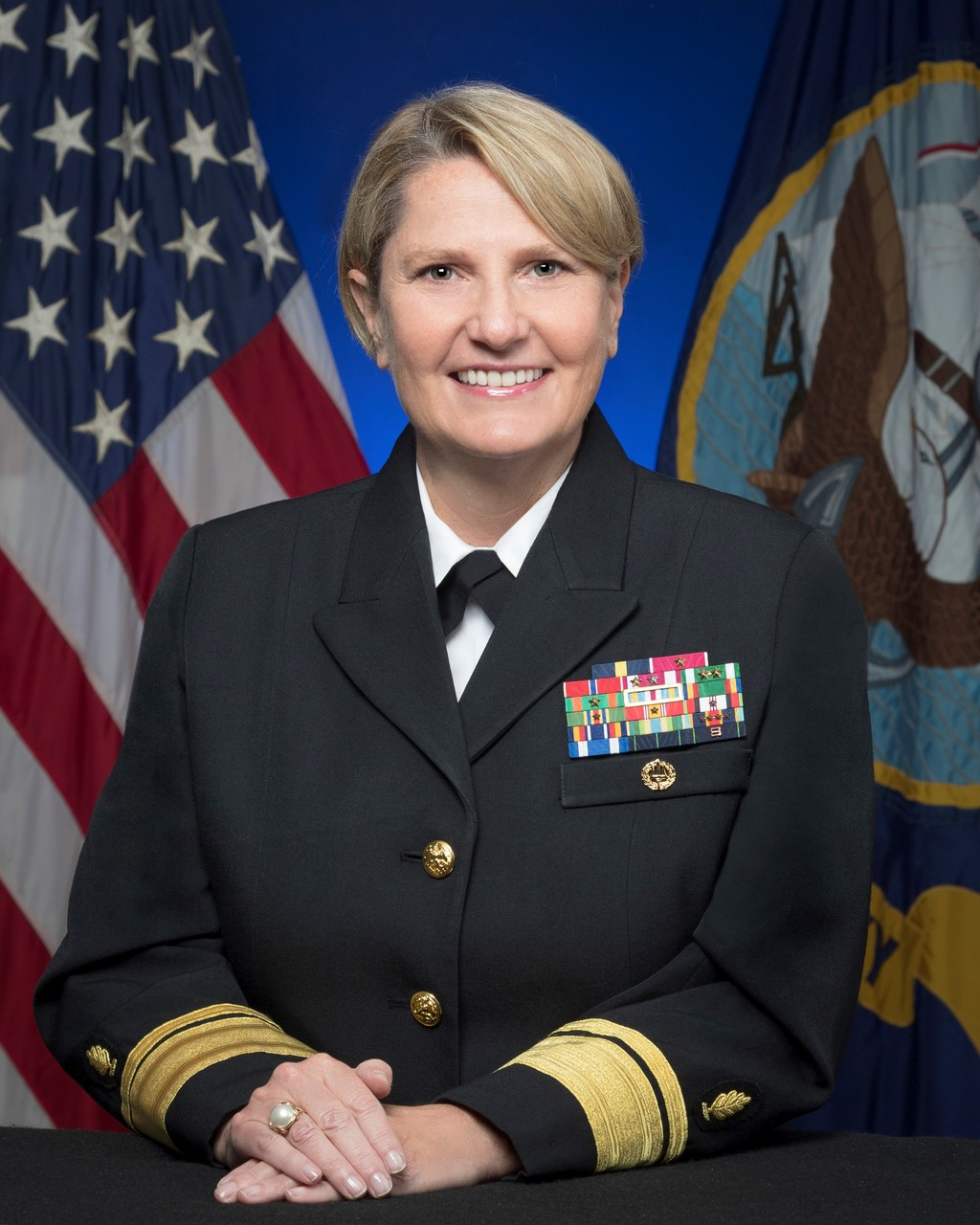
- Official portrait, 2020
- Military career
- Allegiance: United States
- Branch: United States Navy
- Service years: 1990–2023
- Rank: Rear Admiral
- Commands: National Capital Medical Directorate; Naval Medical Forces Atlantic; U.S. Naval Hospital Okinawa

Anne M. Swap is a United States Navy rear admiral who has served as the Director of the National Capital Medical Directorate from July 2, 2020, to July 2023. Previously, she served as the Commander of Naval Medical Forces Atlantic from November 2016 to July 2020.

Military offices
Preceded by Pius A. Aiyelawo	Commander of the U.S. Naval Hospital Okinawa; 2013–2015	Succeeded by Timothy H. Weber
Preceded by ???	Liaison Officer to the Defense Health Agency of the Bureau of Medicine and Surgery; 2015–2016	Succeeded by ???
Preceded by Ken Iverson	Commander of Naval Medical Forces Atlantic; 2016–2020	Succeeded by Darin K. Via
Preceded by Shanna Woyak	Director of the National Capital Medical Directorate; 2020–2023	Vacant
