= University of Indianapolis (1896) =

University in Indianapolis, Indiana, U.S.

- Type: Private medical, dental, law, and liberal arts college
- Active: 1896–1936
- Location: Indianapolis, Indiana, U.S.
- Campus: Multiple; urban to suburban.
- Colors: Royal purple

The University of Indianapolis (U of I) was a consortium of colleges established in 1896 in Indianapolis, Indiana, United States, with the goal to form "a great school commensurate with the city’s importance and including all departments of learning." It was founded by Butler University, the Medical College of Indiana, and the Indiana Law School, with the Indiana Dental College joining in 1904. Butler was renamed to Butler College and functioned as the school's undergraduate and liberal arts college. Each institution retained separate administration of its own school. Among the trustees were former United States president Benjamin Harrison and businessman Eli Lilly.

Initial reactions expressed through newspaper accounts were very enthusiastic. A school seal was created, royal purple was adopted as the school's color, and students created a university yell.

Students at each component school generally maintained their own organizations and activities; however, several university-wide organizations existed, such as a glee club, a band, and a debate team that engaged with the University of Notre Dame and Indiana University. A football team was established as well, but due to scheduling differences, Butler established its own team in 1901. The Medical College did so as well in 1903, and played teams such as the Purdue Boilermakers in 1904. George Washington's birthday became an unofficial university day, with students from each college coming together for a parade in downtown Indianapolis.

Plans to create a central campus and expand the number of component colleges existed but never materialized. Within a few years, each college began to look elsewhere. The Medical College of Indiana merged with Purdue University's medical school in 1905 (itself incorporating into the Indiana University School of Medicine in 1908), Butler became independent once more in 1906, and the Dental College joined Indiana University as the Indiana University School of Dentistry in 1925.

The name University of Indianapolis was last used by the Indiana Law School in 1936 when it merged with the Benjamin Harrison Law School and retained the same name. It joined Indiana University in 1944 and is now known as the Indiana University Robert H. McKinney School of Law. Butler University remains independent to this day.

== University yell ==
The school's yell was reportedly:

Razzle dazzle, never frazzle,
Not a thread but wool!
All together, all together,
That's the way we pull!
Butler, medical, dental, law,
U of I, U of I, rah rah rah!
