= Carl F. Gugino =

American orthodontist

Carl Frank Gugino
- Education: University at Buffalo
- Known for: Founder of The Millennium Society & Great Lakes Orthodontics. Developed the first Virtual Treatment Objective along with Dr. Thomas Ricketts
- Medical career
- Profession: Dentist
- Sub-specialties: orthodontics

Carl Frank Gugino is an American orthodontist who is known to develop the first computerized cephalometric and visual treatment objective (VTO) program with Dr. Robert M. Ricketts and Dr. Bench. He is mostly known, along with Peter R. Breads, to have founded Great Lakes Dental Technologies, formerly known as Great Lakes Orthodontics, which is an orthodontic laboratory and product company.

== Life ==
He graduated in 1953 from University at Buffalo. He then served dental officer in the United States Navy Dental Corps from 1953 to 1955. He was stationed at the naval hospital at Marine Corps Air Station Cherry Point in North Carolina and became a lieutenant in 1955. After serving in the Navy, Gugino worked as a dentist for several years before he specialized in orthodontics from the same university in 1961. He developed the first computerized cephalometric and visual treatment objective (VTO) program with Dr. Thomas Ricketts and Dr. Bench. He authored a textbook called Next Generation BioprogressiveTM Philosophy, ZeroBase OrthodonticsTM. He worked with Dr. Suyehiro and founded the Millennium Society. This society is focused on the practice management aspect of orthodontics.

== Awards and recognition ==
- French R.M. Ricketts Society - President
- Bioprogressive Study Club, Japan - President
- The Millennium Society - Founder
- Great Lakes Orthodontics, 1965 - Founder
