= Robert M. Ricketts =

American orthodontist (1920–2003)

- Born: Robert Murray Ricketts; May 5, 1920; Kokomo, Indiana
- Died: June 17, 2003 (aged 83); Scottsdale, Arizona
- Education: Indiana University School of Dentistry
- Known for: Developed Rickett's Cephalometric Analysis, Bioprogressive Theory, an .018in slot for orthodontic bracket, Utility arch
- Medical career
- Profession: Dentist
- Sub-specialties: Orthodontics

Robert Murray Ricketts (May 5, 1920 – June 17, 2003) was an American orthodontist known for many contributions in the field of orthodontics. Most important contributions were related to his development of Ricketts' Cephalometric Analysis and an .018-inch slot in an orthodontic bracket. His research focused on the growth and structural variation of the face and jaws.

== Life ==
Ricketts was born in Kokomo, Indiana into a poor family. In his early childhood years, his family's farming business was devastated by the Great Depression of the 1920s. After high school, he worked as a laborer in a steel mill factory and a radio factory for one year. He obtained his dental degree from Indiana University School of Dentistry in 1945. He then joined the U.S. Navy as a dentist for two years and eventually went to the University of Illinois to study orthodontics under Dr. Allan G. Brodie. He obtained his master's degree in 1947.

He was a professor at many universities in the world, including Loma Linda University, University of Illinois at Chicago, University of Southern California. During his lifetime, he was member of 17 professional societies and gave over 100 lectures all over the world about orthodontics. In 1981, he founded the American Institute for Bioprogressive Education.

He retired at the age of 72 and moved to Scottsdale, Arizona in 1992. He died at the age of 83 in 2003. Ricketts was married twice and was survived by four children: Robin, Gale, Craig, and Anastar.

== Orthodontics ==
Ricketts' contributions in orthodontics started in the 1950s. During that era, doctors Alan Brodie and Holly Broadbent Sr. believed in using cephalometric radiographs for longitudinal studies rather than for clinical applications. Ricketts' views were contrary. He published two papers in 1960 in which he showed his work of using cephalometric X-rays on 1000 patients in his clinic. Some of his contributions to the field of orthodontics were

- the first straight wire bracket .018 inch slot, in 1970
- cephalometric analysis, which allowed clinicians to compare their patients with norms based on age, sex, and race
- the first cephalometric system to forecast treatment result plus growth in treatment planning (developed with Carl F. Gugino)
- pentamorphine arches, which are five different arch forms individualized to different patients
- root ratings based upon the works of Miura and Lee to quantify the forces necessary to move teeth in any plane of space
- Ricketts' Utility Arch
- computerized cephalometric analysis
- the concept of bioprogressive philosophy (developed with Carl Gugino and Ruel Bench)

Ricketts published over 30 books. Nine of his books (3 volumes) concerned cranio-facial orthopedics. He also wrote a personal narrative called The Reappearing American that was published in 1993.

== Bioprogressive therapy ==
Ricketts developed the bioprogressive philosophy which stated that a face should be treated as a whole, rather than focusing one's attention on just teeth and occlusion. This philosophy involves over 100 principles that are divided into the "four" sciences known as Social, Biological, Clinical, and Mechanical. Some of the principles of this philosophy includes:

- the importance of diagnosis and treatment in orthodontics, with the application of the Visual Treatment Objective (VTO) and evaluating anchorage control during the therapy
- torque control throughout treatment, which leads to more efficient treatment
- muscular and cortical bone anchorage
- proper application of pressure in relation to movement of teeth in various direction
- treatment of overbite before the overjet
- sectional arch treatment, in which treatment in one arch can be broken down into various segments
- overtreatment in order to overcome the tendency of relapse
- pre-fabricated appliances, which allows clinicians to focus more time delivering the appliance than constructing it

== Morganics ==
In the 1950s, Ricketts was the first person in United States to prescribe nutritional supplements in his orthodontic and orthopedic practice. Later, he developed a nutritional community and eventually, due to his contributions in the field of microbiology and chemistry, the Morganics Nutrition Supplement was developed. The company Morganics was founded in 1993 and is currently based in Phoenix, Arizona.

== Awards and recognitions ==
- Diplomate of American Board of Orthodontics
- Merit Award - American Society of Dentistry for Children
- William Cogswell Distinguished Service Award in Oral Surgery
- Albert H. Ketcham Award in 1975
- John Mershon Lecturer in 1976
- Associated Journals of Europe Award in 1983
- Strang Award - Connecticut State Society of Orthodontics
- Joe Peak Honor lecturer in 1999 at the Southwestern Society of Orthodontics Annual Session
- American Sleep and Breathing Academy Hall of Fame
- Waldron Lecturer Award - American Society of Plastic and Reconstructive Surgeons

== Positions ==
- Rocky Mountain Data Systems - Vice President and Director of Research
- American Institute for Bioprogressive Education - Founder

== See also ==
- Anchorage (orthodontics)
- American Board of Orthodontics
