= Cornelius H. Mack =

United States Navy Admiral and dentist

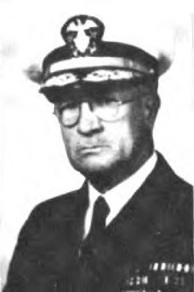
- Born: September 1, 1885; West Springfield, Massachusetts, US
- Died: August 22, 1958 (aged 72); Largo, Florida, US
- Burial place: Arlington National Cemetery
- Military career
- Allegiance: United States of America
- Branch: United States Navy
- Service years: March 1914 - November 1945
- Rank: Rear Admiral
- Conflicts: World War I World War II
- Awards: Navy Cross; Silver Star (3)^{Note 2} Purple Heart; Croix de Guerre with Gold Star

Cornelius H. Mack (September 1, 1885 – August 22, 1958) was a Rear Admiral in the United States Navy. He served as the Chief of the United States Navy Dental Corps for a brief time in 1922, and was the first dental officer to be permanently promoted to Rear Admiral.^{Note 1}

== Early life and education ==
Cornelius Henry Mack was born in West Springfield, Massachusetts on 1 September 1885. He graduated first from West Springfield High School, and then from the Harvard University Dental School in 1906 with a Doctor of Dental Medicine. He joined the recently formed United States Navy Dental Corps on 2 March 1914.

== Military career ==
History of Assignments
Assignment	Dates
Twelfth Naval District, San Francisco	September 1943 - November 1945
Fifth Naval District, Norfolk	January 1943 - August 1943
Naval Training Station, Naval Base, Norfolk	May 1937 - January 1943
Mare Island Naval Shipyard	October 1933 - May 1937
Naval Hospital New York	December 1929 - September 1933
Marine Detachment, American Legation, Peiping, China	December 1928 - December 1929
Naval Station Cavite, Philippines	
Boston Navy Yard	July 1924 - September 1927
USS MacLeish (DD-220)	June 1924 - July 1924
USS Pittsburgh	August 1922 - June 1924
Chief, United States Navy Dental Corps	February 1922 - August 1922
Naval Dispensary, Washington DC	February 1922 - August 1922
USS Panther	January 1922 - February 1922
USS Pennsylvania (BB-38)	September 1919 - January 1922
Sixth Regiment Marines	September 1917 - September 1919
United States Naval Academy	March 1914 - September 1917

Cornelius Mack's first military assignment was as an assistant dental surgeon at the United States Naval Academy, where he served until he was reassigned to the 6th Marine Regiment out of Quantico. He was with this unit when it was deployed to France during World War I.

=== Combat service during World War I ===
While attached to the 6th Marines, Cornelius H. Mack saw combat several times on the western front, most notably during the Battle of Belleau Wood, and the Battle of Soissons. He is credited with continuing to care for and evacuate the wounded despite coming under attack multiple times, and with other displays of gallantry. For his actions in these battles, Cornelius H. Mack was awarded the Navy Cross, multiple Citation Stars, three of which were later upgraded to the Silver Star.^{Note 2} He was also awarded the Croix de Guerre with Gold Star

"For extraordinary heroism and devotion to duty with the 6th Regiment, U. S. Marines. In the action at the Bois de Belleau, (France), on June 12, 1918, when his dressing station was subject to a heavy gas bombardment, he remained on duty and carried on the evacuation of the wounded, refusing to leave until all wounded and Hospital Corps men had been removed to a place of safety; as a result he was severely gassed. In the action at Vierzy (France), on July 19, 1918, he accompanied the advance and was exposed for fifteen hours to the fire of machine guns and artillery, performing his duties with marked coolness and precision.

— Navy Cross citation

Suffering from both acute gas inhalation and the 1918 influenza, Cornelius H. Mack was medically evacuated from the front lines on 20 July 1918. He remained assigned to the 6th Marines until September the following year, when he was reassigned to the USS Pennsylvania (BB-38). From there, he was assigned to a variety of both sea and shore tours of duty, including overseas duty in the Philippines and China, and also served as a clinical professor of oral surgery at New York University.

On 15 June 1932, he received an Honorary Doctor of Laws (LL.D) from the College of the Holy Cross.^{Note 3} In 1936, Cornelius H. Mack, along with many other officers including Alexander G. Lyle, filed suit in the United States Court of Claims over a pay dispute. Citing the 1935 W. W. Hargrave v. The United States decision, the Court awarded Mack $1370.05, equivalent to $25,242 in 2019.

Cornelius H. Mack was transferred to the retired list on 1 September 1943, and promoted to Rear Admiral on that date. He continued to serve on active duty until November 1945 due to World War II.

Cornelius H. Mack died on 22 August 1958 in Largo, Florida, and was interred in Arlington National Cemetery.

== Notes ==
^Note 1: Alexander Gordon Lyle was the first dental officer to be promoted to Rear Admiral, but this advancement was temporary in nature. Compare the entries for Cornelius Henry Mack on page 674 to Alexander Gordon Lyle's entry on page 381 of the 1944 Register of the Commissioned and Warrant Officers of the United States Navy and Marine Corps and Reserve Officers on Active Duty.
^Note 2: As the Silver Star medal was first introduced in 1932, none of the awards Cornelius H. Mack received in 1918 were Silver Stars. Rather, he was awarded several Citation Stars, some of which were later upgraded to the Silver Star. A History of Dentistry in the U.S. Army to World War II credits Cornelius H. Mack with 6 Army citation stars, and The Medical Department of the United States Navy with the Army and Marine Corps in France in World War I includes the full text of 6 citations for the same. However, Cornelius Mack's headstone is engraved "SS & 2 OLC" meaning, "Silver Star and 2 Oak Leaf Clusters" which indicates three awards. Additionally, Cornelius H. Mack's official Naval biography credits Mack with 3 Silver Stars, and the Victory Medal with 5 Citation Stars. This indicates 8 total awards, with Mack either not electing or not being eligible to upgrade 5 of them. Note that the first two sources discussed in this section explicitly state that 6 awards were Army citation stars, which were eligible for upgrade.
^Note 3: Cornelius H. Macks' official biography states that he was awarded this honorary Doctor of Laws in 1933, however, the university's 1931–1932 catalog shows that he received the degree on the 15 June 1932 commencement, as does the "News" section of the Journal of the American Dental Association's August 1932 issue.

Military offices
Preceded by Harry E. Harvey	Chief, Navy Dental Corps; February 1922 - August 1922	Succeeded by George H. Reed
