= William N. Cogan =

William Cogan
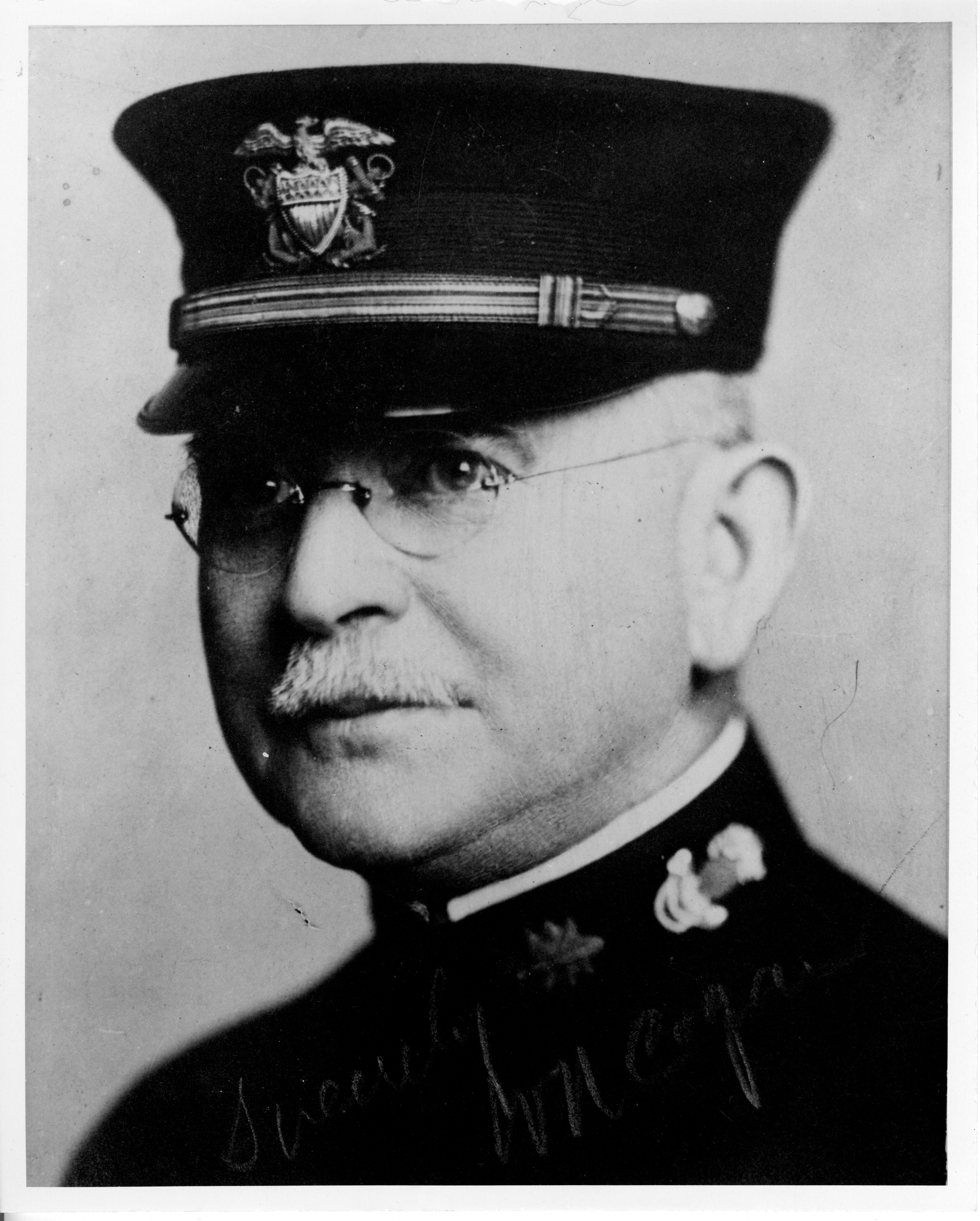
- Born: 21 May 1856; Washington, D.C., United States
- Died: 4 October 1943 (aged 87); Bethesda, Maryland, United States
- Burial place: Arlington National Cemetery, Virginia, United States
- Education: Columbian University
- Spouse(s): Loretta Cogan (died 1917) Sallie Zimmerman (m. 1922)
- Military career
- Allegiance: United States of America
- Branch: United States Navy
- Service years: 24 October 1912 - 21 May 1926
- Rank: Lieutenant Commander
- Commands: United States Navy Dental Corps
- Other work: Co-founded Washington Dental College; Dean of the Georgetown University School of Dentistry

William Neal Cogan (21 May 1856 - 4 October 1943) was a dentist, educator, and a Lieutenant Commander in the United States Navy from Washington, D.C. His professional achievements include co-founding the Washington Dental College, being the first dental officer to serve on active duty in the United States Navy, being the first Chief of the United States Navy Dental Corps, and holding the deanship of the Georgetown University School of Dentistry twice.

== Early career ==
William N. Cogan was born in Washington, D.C., on 21 May 1856.^{Note 1} Before picking up dentistry, he tried his hand at business. He graduated from Columbian University, then co-founded the Washington Dental College in 1897 and served as the dean and treasurer of that school. After the college was acquired by Georgetown University in 1901, he served as the first dean of Georgetown's new dental school.

He was also the president of the District of Columbia Dental Society from 1898 to 1899.

== Naval career ==
President William Taft signed legislation creating the United States Navy Dental Corps on 22 August 1912. Dr. William N. Cogan resigned his deanship at Georgetown, and was appointed to the fledgling corps on 24 October of that year. He became the first active duty dental officer in the United States Navy on the 30th.^{Note 2} Dr. Cogan's first duty station was the Washington, D.C., Naval Dispensary. Along with fellow Dental Corps officer Dr. Emory A. Bryant and Medical Corps officer Lt. Cmdr. Richmond C. Holcomb, Dr. Cogan served on the first examining board to select additional dentists for naval service. From April 1918 to 7 June 1919, he served as the first Chief of the United States Navy Dental Corps.

William Cogan was married to Loretta Foster Cogan, who died 13 February 1917. After her death, he remarried to Sallie E. Zimmerman of Washington, D.C., on 4 November 1922, while he was stationed at Mare Island.

== Later career ==
Dr. William Cogan retired from the Navy on his 70th birthday as a Lieutenant Commander, and was once again appointed as the Dean of the Georgetown University School of Dentistry. In 1927, the Dean Cogan Dental Society was founded and named in his honor. On 8 June 1932, he received an honorary Doctor of Laws (LL.D) from Mount St. Mary's College for his role in establishing the Dental Corps of the United States Navy. In May 1934, then Chief of the Navy Dental Corps Harry Harvey presented Dr. Cogan with the keys to the Omicron Kappa Upsilon honors fraternity. He retired from his deanship at Georgetown on his 82nd birthday, 21 May 1938. Between the two periods of deanship, Dr. Cogan had been dean at Georgetown for 25 years.

Willian N. Cogan died on 4 October 1943 at the Bethesda Naval Hospital following a prolonged illness. A memorial service was held at St. Matthew's Cathedral, and he was interred with military honors at the Arlington National Cemetery. His pallbearers included former Chief of the Naval Dental Corps Albert Knox, then current Chief Robert Davis, and Spry Claytor who would later become the Chief of the Corps.

== Notes ==
^Note 1: The Dental Corps of the United States Navy: A Chronology 1912-1962 records William N. Cogan's birthday as being on the 31st of May. However, earlier sources including articles in The Evening Star, the Register of the Commissioned and Warrant Officers of the United States Navy as well as Dr. Cogan's tombstone record his date of birth as the 21st of May. Some sources dated after the 1962 Chronology include the erroneous birth date.

^Note 2: William N. Cogan was not the first dental officer to join the United States Navy. Dr. Emory Bryant joined the Naval Reserve one day prior, on October 23. When Dr. Cogan joined on the 24th, he too was in a reserve status. However, Dr. Cogan was the first to be ordered to active duty. Before either men entered service as officers, the Navy did employ some dentists as either civilians or enlisted men.

== Additional resources ==
- Georgetown University maintains an archive of newspaper clippings related to Dr. William N. Cogan.
- Both the Journal of the American Dental Association and the New York Times published obituaries for Dr. William Cogan.
- The obituary for William N. Cogan's second wife, Sallie Zimmerman Cogan was published in The Evening Star on 8 April 1950, page A-4.

Military offices
Preceded by New Office	Chief, Navy Dental Corps; 1918 - 1919	Succeeded by Harry E. Harvey
