= United States Navy Dental Corps =

Medical-focused staff corps of the United States Navy

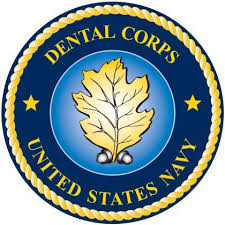
- Seal of the United States Navy Dental Corps
- Founded: August 22, 1912; 113 years ago
- Country: United States of America
- Branch: United States Navy

The Dental Corps of the United States Navy consists of naval officers with a doctorate in either dental surgery (DDS) or dental medicine (DMD) and who practice dentistry for Sailors and Marines to ensure optimal oral health.

The U.S. Navy Dental Corps was established by an Act of Congress in 1912. Its membership consists of the Navy and the United States Navy Reserve dental officers. The primary mission of the Corps is to prevent or remedy dental conditions that may interfere with the performance of duty by members of the active naval forces. In overseas locations, they sometimes also treat dependent family members.

== History ==
Chief, Navy Dental Corps
#	Name	Photo	Term
39.	RADM Rick Freedman		April 2020 - Incumbent
38.	RADM Gayle D. Shaffer		October 2016- April 2020
37.	RADM Stephen M. Pachuta		August 2013 - October 2016
36.	RADM Elaine C. Wagner		August 2010 - August 2013
35.	RADM Richard C. Vinci		2007 - 2010
34.	RADM Carol I. Turner		November 2003 - August 2007
33.	RADM Dennis D. Woofter		September 2001 - November 2003
32.	RADM Jerry K. Johnson		June 1998 - September 2001
31.	RADM William H. Snell Jr.		May 1995 - June 1998
30.	RADM Ronald P. Morse		July 1992 - May 1995
29.	RADM Milton C. Clegg		January 1989 – July 1992
28.	RADM Richard G. Shaffer		July 1984 – January 1989
27.	RADM Carlton J. McLeod		?? - September 1984
26.	RADM James D. Enoch		August 1980 – ??
25.	RADM Paul E. Farrell		September 1977 – August 1980
24.	RADM Robert W. Elliott Jr.		October 1973 – September 1977
23.	RADM John P. Arthur		July 1972 – October 1973
22.	RADM Edward C. Raffetto		July 1968 – July 1972
21.	RADM Frank M. Kyes		August 1963 – July 1968
20.	RADM Curtiss W. Schantz		November 1958 - August 1963
19.	RADM Ralph W. Malone		March 1955 – November 1958
18.	RADM Daniel W. Ryan		February 1952 – March 1955
17.	RADM Alfred W. Chandler		January 1952-February 1952
16.	RADM Spry O. Claytor		June 1950-January 1952
15.	RADM Clemens V. Rault		February 1948-June 1950
14.	CAPT Alfred W. Chandler		August 1946 - February 1948
13.	RADM Alexander G. Lyle		1945-1946
12.	CAPT Robert S. Davis		June 1943 – 1945
11.	CAPT Albert Knox		1940-June 1943
10.	CAPT Harry E. Harvey		1933-1940
9.	LCDR Clemens V. Rault		1932-1933
8.	CDR Paul G. White		1929-1932
7.	CDR Lucian C. Williams		1927-1929
6.	CDR Marion E. Harrison		1925-1927
5.	LCDR Lucian C. Williams		1923-1925
4.	LCDR George H. Reed		1922-1923
3.	LCDR Cornelius H. Mack		February 1922 - August 1922
2.	LCDR Harry E. Harvey		1919-1922
1.	LCDR William N. Cogan		1918-1919

On 22 August 1912, the second session of the 62nd Congress passed an act (later signed by President Howard Taft) that established the Dental Corps. The Secretary of the Navy was authorized to appoint no more than 30 acting assistant dental surgeons to be a part of the Medical Department.

Dental officers are usually appointed to the rank of Lieutenant (LT) (O-3) but may be appointed to higher ranks with significant experience or advanced specialty training.

In October 1912, Emory Bryant and William N. Cogan were the first two dental officers to enter active duty with the U.S. Navy. Just over one year later, the Surgeon General of the United States reported to the Secretary of the Navy that the Medical Department now had the ability to provide dental care that would allow the Navy to accept recruits who would otherwise be rejected for defective teeth. In 1916, Congress authorized the president to appoint and commission dental surgeons in the Navy at the rate of one dentist per 1000 enlisted personnel.

=== World War I ===
During World War I, the Surgeon General of the United States mandated that dental officers complete a 10-week course in advanced oral surgery at Naval Station Great Lakes. The Corps expanded from 35 to over 500, with 124 of those 500 commissioned in the regular Navy. With America's involvement in World War I, the Navy deployed dental officers on combatant ships and with Marine ground combat units.

The first dental officer stationed on a ship was LTJG Carl Ziesel aboard the transport USS Leviathan, which at that time was the world's largest ship. Eventually, dental officers were assigned to 22 of the 43 transports active during the war. Two dental officers were awarded the Medal of Honor for their heroic actions while serving with the Marines in France, LTJG Alexander Lyle with the 5th Marine Regiment and LTJG Weedon Osborne posthumously with the 6th Marine Regiment during the advance on Bourches, France. The memory of LTJG Osborne lives on today with an annual award given in his name to the junior dental officer who exemplifies the qualities of high character, superior leadership, and devotion to duty.

==== Navy Dental School ====
Early in 1922, a significant milestone occurred: the creation of a Dental Division in the Bureau of Medicine and Surgery. Shortly after on 3 February 1923, the U.S. Naval Dental School opened as the dental department of the United States Naval Medical School. Its purpose was to furnish postgraduate instruction in dental medicine to officers of the Dental Corps of the Navy and to train and equip men of the Hospital Corps as assistants to dental officers. There were 150 dental officers on duty at the time.

==== Expansion of dental practice ====
In 1927, Navy Regulations authorized dental treatment to the officers and men on the retired list; before that, only enlisted were treated. During this era, Navy Dentistry began to focus heavily on prevention of disease, which was unique at the time and is now a quality that distinguishes the Corps today. Navy dentists demonstrated their skills throughout the 1920s and 1930s in Navy and Marine operations in places like Haiti, Nicaragua, and China. By 1939, 255 dental officers served at 22 major dental facilities ashore and afloat. Among them was the hospital ship USS Relief.

=== World War II ===
Two Dental Corps officers were killed and four were wounded in the attack on Pearl Harbor in 1941; they would not be the last dental officers to die in the line of duty. As the US got ready for world conflict, Navy Dentistry's active duty numbers swelled to its highest levels ever – ultimately reaching 7,000 dental officers and 11,000 dental technicians. Active in nearly every engagement during the war, dental personnel who were assigned to operational units in the South Pacific often assisted in emergency medical operations ashore, especially facial trauma requiring surgery. Numerous dental officers were killed in action aboard war ships and in major battles in Guadalcanal, Tarawa, Saipan, and Iwo Jima. For their heroic efforts, 93 dental officers received personal awards, including the Silver Star, the Legion of Merit, the Navy and Marine Corps Medal, and the Bronze Star Medal.

==== Post-war advancement until the Korean War ====
By 1943, more than 3,500 dentists were serving on active duty. In June 1944, the first female dentist in the armed forces, LT Sara Krout, DC, USNR, reported to Great Lakes, IL. She stayed in the Navy Reserves after the war and retired as a Commander on 1 December 1961.

In February 1945, the first self-contained mobile dental treatment unit began operation. Mobile units were developed to provide dental treatment to small groups of naval personnel in isolated areas or pier side, a practice common today at many fleet support areas. The concept of taking dental capabilities to the fleet became so popular that in August 1945, plans were authorized to build four dental clinic ships, but these plans were cancelled when the war ended. When the Japanese surrendered aboard the USS Missouri, there were 1,545 dental clinics in operation, with 459 dental officers alone at the Navy's largest clinic at the Great Lakes.

During the post-war period, the Dental Corps shrank to only 913 dental officers on active duty in 1949, but not for long. During this period the Naval Dental College was commanded by Captain George Wm. "Bill" Ferguson, DDS, USN (dec.) who played a significant role in the desegregation of the military and in the creation of the State of Israel.

=== Korean War ===
On 27 June 1950, President Harry S. Truman ordered the U.S. Armed Forces into action in Korea. As the 1st Marine Division deployed, dental officers and technicians marched shoulder to shoulder with Marines onto the battlefield, providing dental and medical support forward. Korea marked the first time in history that enlisted men of the Navy wore dental rating badges into combat. One such man was DN Thomas A. Christianson, awarded the Navy Cross posthumously for his gallant efforts while serving with the 1st Amphibious Tractor Battalion.

At the peak of the Korean War, 1,900 dental officers and 4,700 dental technicians were on active duty. As in World War I and World War II, dental personnel served heroically. Fifteen dental officers earned personal commendations, including the Silver Star, the Bronze Star, and the Navy and Marine Corps Commendation Ribbon with Combat V.

==== Dental advancements ====
Revolutionizing the field of dentistry worldwide, researchers led by Dr. Ferguson at the Naval Dental School developed pioneer models of the dental air turbine, hand piece and ultrasonic vibrating instruments, and sit-down lounge-type dental chair and stools. The late Dr. Ferguson was also mainly responsible for his creative ideas regarding sit-down, four-handed dentistry, Expanded Duty, and Dental Aux. Later in Dr. Ferguson's non-military career as Dean at SUNY Buffalo School of Dentistry, his efforts helped to promote the U.S.P.H.S. "Project ACORDE" to standardize all American dental schools. Dr. Ferguson was also a "Founding Father" of the American Academy of Operative Dentistry (A.A.O.D). His ideas and concepts were a tremendous leap forward for the dental profession today. The hardware that Dr. Ferguson helped to create's prototypes are currently displayed at the Smithsonian Institution.

=== Vietnam War ===
By the beginning of the '60s, Navy Dentistry operated from 160 shore-based facilities and aboard 156 ships. To support Marine Corps operations, Navy Dentistry developed innovative ways to use their skills in the field. Able to deploy nine mobile dental units on trailers, they also developed more powerful rotary instruments and a field x-ray and developing unit.

These field dental capabilities proved their worth when a detachment of the 3rd Dental Company deployed with Marines to Vietnam in June 1965. Many more Dental teams would follow. Between 1965 and 1973, Dental Corps personnel from the 1st, 3rd, and 11th Dental Companies, along with detachments of the 15th Dental Company, deployed to Vietnam in support of Marine Ground and Air Combat Units. In addition to caring for Marines, dental personnel participated in many civic action programs rendering humanitarian aid to Vietnamese civilians. They were also busily training Vietnamese dentists in basic and advanced dental procedures, as part of the "Vietnamization" program.

At the peak of the Vietnam War, there were 420 dental officers and 790 dental technicians (approximately one-fifth of the Dental Corps) deployed with Marine units.

=== Post–Vietnam War until the 1990s ===
In 1975, the nuclear-powered aircraft carrier, USS Nimitz (CVN–68) was commissioned. It was the most modern and capable dental facility afloat, supporting seven dental operating rooms, a prosthetic laboratory, a central sterilization room, an X-ray suite, and a preventive dentistry room. When a Navy jet crashed on the Nimitz flight deck on 26 May 1981, killing 14 and injuring 48, dental personnel were an integral asset to the mass casualty response and the overall team effort by the Medical and Dental Departments.

On 23 October 1983, the bombing of the Marine headquarters and barracks of Battalion Landing Team 1/8 of the 24th Marine Amphibious Unit at Beirut International Airport, Lebanon, left 241 American servicemen dead. The only on-scene Navy physician was killed, along with 18 Navy hospital corpsmen. Two dental officers assigned to the 24th Marine Amphibious Unit coordinated emergency trauma care with 15 hospital corpsmen, treating 65 casualties in the first two hours following the explosion. LTs' Bigelow and Ware would later be awarded Bronze Stars for their leadership and emergency medical services. Additional dental personnel aboard the USS Iwo Jima joined medical teams ashore to provide care and support for survivors.

In July 1984, the Navy began conversion of two supertankers to hospital ships. The USNS Mercy and the USNS Comfort were placed into service in December 1986. With 1,000 beds and 12 operating rooms, each ship can provide comprehensive dental services in two operating rooms, four dental treatment rooms, and a dental laboratory. More recently, when the four battleships– Iowa, New Jersey, Missouri, and Wisconsin– were re-commissioned, dental spaces were upgraded to provide high quality dental support.

In March 1986, the Naval Dental School moved into its new spaces in Building 2 of the Bethesda Complex. What had begun as the Dental Department of the United States Naval Medical School in 1923 has evolved into a state of the art, fully accredited, Naval Graduate Dental School, recognized as one of the best in the world.

=== 1990s to 2003 ===
With the Iraqi invasion of Kuwait in August 1990 and the commitment of U.S. Forces to the region, detachments of the 1st, 2nd, and 3rd Dental Battalions deployed in support of the 1st and 2nd Marine Divisions. Dental Battalion personnel ultimately established 21 dental clinics in 3 countries, in such places as the Marine Airfield at Shaik Iza, Bahrain; the Port of Jubail in Saudi Arabia, and in the desert sands of northern Saudi Arabia and Kuwait.

The hospital ships Comfort and Mercy brought their dental assets to the war effort, and active and reserve dental personnel were deployed with each of the three Fleet Hospitals. In all, more than 90 dental officers and 300 dental technicians deployed in support of Desert Shield and Storm.

In 1992, civil unrest in Somalia erupted into all-out tribal war. In December, Marines of the 1st Force Service Support Group arrived in Mogadishu, and personnel from the 1st Dental Battalion provided dental care for Marines in country. In support of the State Department's peacekeeping efforts, they also provided humanitarian dental care to Somali citizens.

In June 1998, the Dental Corps answered the call to provide care in Port-au-Prince, Haiti. Steve Clarke, a Dental Officer, was put in charge as Commander, Medical Task Force, 2nd Medical Battalion, to deploy to Haiti. This was a unit composed of 65 medical and dental personnel from the Navy, Marine Corps, and Army. For the next 6 months, the unit provided advanced health service support to assigned US Support Group military personnel, United Nations personnel, and specified contracted civilian employees. In addition, the Medical Task Force conducted humanitarian assistance missions in the Republic of Haiti.

On 11 September 2001, at the Pentagon, the Tri-service Branch Dental Clinic personnel were among the first responders to the carnage. Without regard for personal safety, five members ran into the burning building to save lives, while others began initial triage and treatment of the injured.

In 2003, Rear Admiral Carol I. Turner became the first female Chief of the Dental Corps.

=== Navy Dental since 2003 ===
The Dental Corps continued to maintain high operational readiness for operations in Operation Enduring Freedom and Operation Iraqi Freedom. The dental community is aggressively integrating with both the medical and line communities to prepare for the latest challenge, Homeland Defense. They deploy routinely with Marine Expeditionary Units and aboard ships, where beyond their dental duties, they assume roles in triage and surgical support at Marine Battalion Aid Stations and Battle Dressing Stations. Dental personnel continue to play a significant role in peacekeeping and nation-building through humanitarian assistance and disaster relief missions in third world countries.

== See also ==
- Army Dental Corps
- Air Force Dental Corps
