= International College of Dentists =

- Formation: 1920
- Type: Professional association and non-profit
- Headquarters: Flint, Michigan, USA
- Location: International
- Members: 12,000+ (2024)
- Official language: Multi-lingual, but English is the official language
- Key people: Dr. Tsurukich Okumura, Dr. Louis Ottofy (Co-Founders)
- Website: www.icd.org

The International College of Dentists (ICD) is a global professional membership association for dentists. Conceived in 1920 and established in 1927, the organization seeks to 'honor outstanding professional achievement, meritorious service, and dedication to the continued progress of dentistry for the benefit of humankind'. With over 12,000 members in 140 countries, the ICD is divided into autonomous sections, largely based on countries or geographical regions. Membership, known as Fellowship, is extended by invitation only and inductees are awarded the title of Fellow of the International College of Dentists (FICD). The ICD is a non-profit organization that fundraises for and supports a wide range of humanitarian and educational projects aimed at improving oral health in underserved communities around the world.

== History ==
The ICD was conceived in 1920 at a farewell party in Tokyo for Dr. Louis Ottofy when he was returning home to the United States after practicing dentistry in the Philippines and Japan for 23 years. A colleague, Dr. Tsurukichi Okumura, a Japanese dentist, and Dr. Ottofy had the idea of forming an international dental organization. Six years later, at the Seventh International Dental Congress in Philadelphia, U.S. a group of dentists met again to finalize the concept of the ICD. On New Year's Eve of 1927, the College was announced with Drs. Ottofy and Okumura as the co-founders. The first President of the College was Andres O. Weber, from Havana, Cuba.

Initially, 250 dentists from 162 countries accepted the Fellowship oath. The group was selected based on an international reputation and participation in the FDI World Dental Federation. Each Fellow was given the task of nominating other dentists for membership.

== Growth of the organization ==
In the years following the initial formation of the ICD, membership grew to the point where autonomous 'Sections' were required. In 1934, the first of these sections, located in the United States of America, was formed. More autonomous sections were formed in the ensuing years: Section II, Canada; Section III, Mexico; Section IV, South America, Section V, Europe; Section VI, India; Section VII, Japan; Section VIII, Australasia; Section IX, Philippines, Section X, Middle East; Section XI, Korea; Section XII, Taiwan; Section XIII, China, Section XIV, Myanmar; and Section XV. Section XX comprises regions around the world that are currently too small to be sections. Today, the organization claims a membership of over 12,000 (2024) from 140 countries.

== Structure ==
The organisation is led by an elected International Council and an Executive Committee. There are international standing and ad hoc committees, and 'Sections' (mostly based on countries) and 'Regions' (smaller areas) that largely manage their activities autonomously.

== Fellowship ==
Dentists who are inducted into the ICD place the post-nominals FICD with their name. Fellowship in the International College of Dentists is extended by invitation only. A nominated dentist must pass a peer-review process leading to the recognition of the individual’s “outstanding professional achievement, meritorious service, and dedication to the continued progress of dentistry for the benefit of humankind".

== Humanitarian and educational efforts ==
The ICD has a number of foundations which carry out both educational and humanitarian projects, and there is a college-wide fund called the Global Visionary Fund (GVF), which is the charitable arm of the ICD International Council. Its initiatives in fundraising and programming allow ICD to achieve its social mission of providing oral health care for the underserved as well as the delivery of educational programs where they are most needed. The College also collaborates with other foundations, charitable groups, and partners to extend its reach. The ICD has a long-term partnership with dental supplies and products giant Henry Schein through the company's charitable foundation, Henry Schein Cares.
