= List of Omicron Kappa Upsilon chapters =

Omicron Kappa Upsilon is a North American honor society serving the field of dentistry. It was established in 1914 at the now defunct Northwestern University Dental School in Chicago, Illinois. In the following list, active chapters are noted in bold and inactive chapters and institutions are in italics.

Chapter	Charter date and range	Institution	Location	Status	Ref.
Alpha	May 21, 1914 – 2001	Northwestern University Dental School	Chicago, Illinois	Inactive	(Note: Chapter went inactive when the dental school closed in 2001.)
**Beta**	1916	University of Pittsburgh School of Dental Medicine	Pittsburgh, Pennsylvania	Active	
Gamma	1916–1991	Washington University School of Dental Medicine	St. Louis, Missouri	Inactive	(Note: Chapter went inactive when the dental school closed in 1991.)
**Delta**	1916	Oregon Health & Science University School of Dentistry	Portland, Oregon	Active	
**Epsilon**	1916	Creighton University School of Dentistry	Omaha, Nebraska	Active	
**Zeta**	1916	USC Herman Ostrow School of Dentistry	Los Angeles, California	Active	
**Eta**	1916	University of Pennsylvania School of Dental Medicine	Philadelphia, Pennsylvania	Active	
**Theta**	1916–1936, 1965	Ohio State University College of Dentistry	Columbus, Ohio	Active	
Iota	1916–1965	Vanderbilt University Dental School	Nashville, Tennessee	Inactive	
**Kappa**	1921	VCU School of Dentistry	Richmond, Virginia	Active	
Lambda	1921–1988	Emory University Dental School	Atlanta, Georgia	Inactive	(Note: Chapter went inactive when the dental school closed in 1988.)
**Mu**	1923	University of Iowa College of Dentistry	Iowa City, Iowa	Active	
**Nu**	1924	University of Louisville School of Dentistry	Louisville, Kentucky	Active	
**Xi**	1924	Marquette University School of Dentistry	Milwaukee, Wisconsin	Active	
**Omicron**	1925	Texas A&M University School of Dentistry	Dallas, Texas	Active	(Note: Chapter formed at Baylor University School of Dentistry, which became the separate nonprofit Baylor College of Dentistry in 1971. In 1996, the college joined the Texas A&M University System.)
Pi	1925–1993	Loyola University Chicago Dental School	Chicago, Illinois	Inactive	(Note: Chapter went inactive when the dental school closed in 1993.)
**Rho**	1929	University of Missouri–Kansas City School of Dentistry	Kansas City, Missouri	Active	(Note: Chapter formed at the Kansas City Dental College, which merged with Western Dental College, eventually becoming part of the University of Missouri system.)
**Sigma**	1928	University of Illinois Chicago College of Dentistry	Chicago, Illinois	Active	
Tau	1929–1970	Loyola University New Orleans Dental School	New Orleans, Louisiana	Inactive	(Note: Chapter went inactive when the dental school closed in 1970.)
**Upsilon**	1929	Case School of Dental Medicine	Cleveland, Ohio	Active	
**Phi**	1930	University of Maryland School of Dentistry	Baltimore, Maryland	Active	
**Chi**	1930	University of Michigan School of Dentistry	Ann Arbor, Michigan	Active	
**Psi**	1930	University of Tennessee College of Dentistry	Memphis, Tennessee	Active	
**Omega**	1930	New York University College of Dentistry	New York City, New York	Active	
**Alpha Alpha**	1930	University of Nebraska Medical Center College of Dentistry	Lincoln, Nebraska	Active	
**Beta Beta**	1930	University of Minnesota School of Dentistry	Minneapolis, Minnesota	Active	
**Gamma Gamma**	1930	Harvard School of Dental Medicine	Boston, Massachusetts	Active	
**Delta Delta**	1933	University of the Pacific Arthur A. Dugoni School of Dentistry	San Francisco, California	Active	
**Epsilon Epsilon**	1934	Columbia University College of Dental Medicine	New York City, New York	Active	
Zeta Zeta	1934–1990	Georgetown University School of Dentistry	Washington, D.C.	Inactive	(Note: Chapter went inactive when the dental school closed in 1990.)
Eta Eta	1934–1967	Saint Louis University Dental School	St. Louis, Missouri	Inactive	(Note: The chapter went inactive when the dental school closed in 1967. Later, the dental school was re-established with SIU.)
**Theta Theta**	1934	Indiana University School of Dentistry	Indianapolis, Indiana	Active	
Iota Iota				Unassigned	
**Kappa Kappa**	1936	Maurice H. Kornberg School of Dentistry	Philadelphia, Pennsylvania	Active	
**Lambda Lambda**	1937	University at Buffalo School of Dental Medicine	Buffalo, New York	Active	
**Mu Mu**	1940	UTHealth School of Dentistry	Houston, Texas	Active	
**Nu Nu**	1941	University of Detroit Mercy School of Dentistry	Detroit, Michigan	Active	
**Xi Xi**	1944	Tufts University School of Dental Medicine	Boston, Massachusetts	Active	
**Omicron Omicron**	1945	Meharry Medical College School of Dentistry	Nashville, Tennessee	Active	
**Pi Pi**	1948	Howard University College of Dentistry	Washington, D.C.	Active	
**Rho Rho**	1948	UCSF School of Dentistry	San Francisco, California	Active	
**Sigma Sigma**	1950	University of Washington School of Dentistry	Seattle, Washington	Active	
**Tau Tau**	1950	University of Toronto Faculty of Dentistry	Toronto, Ontario, Canada	Active	
**Upsilon Upsilon**	1953	UNC Adams School of Dentistry	Chapel Hill, North Carolina	Active	
**Phi Phi**	1954	UAB School of Dentistry	Birmingham, Alabama	Active	
**Chi Chi**	1956	Loma Linda University School of Dentistry	Loma Linda, California	Active	
Psi Psi	1957–1990	Fairleigh Dickinson University Dental School	Rutherford, New Jersey	Inactive	(Note: Chapter wen inactive when the dental school closed in 1990.)
**Omega Omega**	1957	Rutgers School of Dental Medicine	Newark, New Jersey	Active	(Note: Chapter formed at Seton Hall University Dental School, which eventually became the Rutgers School of Dental Medicine.)
**Alpha Beta**	1961	West Virginia University School of Dentistry	Morgantown, West Virginia	Active	
**Beta Gamma**	1961	University of Puerto Rico School of Dental Medicine	San Juan, Puerto Rico	Active	
Gamma Delta	1961–20xx ?	Dr. Gerald Niznick College of Dentistry	Winnipeg, Manitoba, Canada	Inactive	
**Delta Epsilon**	1966	University of Kentucky College of Dentistry	Lexington, Kentucky	Active	
**Epsilon Zeta**	1967	UCLA School of Dentistry	Los Angeles, California	Active	
**Zeta Eta**	1970	James B. Edwards College of Dental Medicine School	Charleston, South Carolina	Active	
Eta Theta	1970–20xx ?	University of British Columbia Faculty of Dentistry	Vancouver, British Columbia, Canada	Inactive	
**Theta Kappa**	1971	Louisiana State University School of Dentistry	New Orleans, Louisiana	Active	
**Kappa Lambda**	1972	Dental College of Georgia	Augusta, Georgia	Active	
**Lambda Mu**	1972	Boston University School of Dental Medicine	Boston, Massachusetts	Active	
**Mu Nu**	1973	UT Health San Antonio School of Dentistry	San Antonio, Texas	Active	
**Nu Xi**	1973	Southern Illinois University School of Dental Medicine	Carbondale, Illinois	Active	
**Xi Omicron**	1974	University of Florida College of Dentistry	Gainesville, Florida	Active	
**Omicron Pi**	1975	University of Oklahoma College of Dentistry	Oklahoma City, Oklahoma	Active	
**Pi Rho**	1976	University of Colorado School of Dental Medicine	Aurora, Colorado	Active	
**Rho Sigma**	1977	University of Mississippi Medical Center School of Dentistry	Jackson, Mississippi	Active	
**Sigma Tau**	1977	Stony Brook University School of Dental Medicine	Stony Brook, New York	Active	
Tau Upsilon	1979–1986	Oral Roberts University Dental School	Tulsa, Oklahoma	Inactive	(Note: Chapter went inactive when the dental school closed in 1986.)
Upsilon Phi	1984–2000	University of Western Ontario Schulich Dentistry	London, Ontario, Canada	Inactive	
**Phi Chi**	1997	University of Connecticut School of Dental Medicine	Farmington, Connecticut	Active	
**Chi Psi**	2000	Nova Southeastern University College of Dental Medicine	Fort Lauderdale, Florida	Active	
**Psi Omega**	2003	UNLV School of Dental Medicine	Las Vegas, Nevada	Active	
**Beta Alpha**	2007	Arizona School of Dentistry and Oral Health	Mesa, Arizona	Active	
**Beta Delta**	2010	Midwestern University Dental Institute, Arizona	Glendale, Arizona	Active	
**Beta Epsilon**	2012	Midwestern University Dental Institute, Illinois	Downers Grove, Illinois	Active	
**Beta Zeta**	2013	Western University of Health Sciences	Pomona, California	Active	
**Beta Eta**	2015	East Carolina University School of Dental Medicine	Greenville, North Carolina	Active	
**Beta Theta**	201x ?	University of New England College of Dental Medicine	Biddeford, Maine	Active	
Beta Iota	201x ?–20xx ?	Roseman University of Health Sciences College of Dental Medicine	Henderson, Nevada	Inactive	
Beta Kappa				Unassigned	
**Beta Lambda**	2017	A.T. Still Missouri School of Dentistry and Oral Health	Kirksville, Missouri	Active	
**Beta Mu**	2018	Touro College of Dental Medicine	Valhalla, New York	Active	
**Beta Nu**	2024	Kansas City University College of Dental Medicine	Kansas City, Missouri	Active	
**Beta Xi**	2024	Woody L. Hunt School of Dental Medicine	El Paso, Texas	Active	

== See also ==
- List of dental schools in the United States
- List of defunct dental schools in the United States
