= Delta Sigma Delta =

International dental fraternity

- ΔΣΔ
- Founded: November 15, 1882; 144 years ago University of Michigan School of Dentistry
- Type: Professional
- Affiliation: Independent
- Former affiliation: PFA; PIC
- Status: Active
- Emphasis: Dentistry
- Scope: International
- Motto: "Knowledge, Strength, Justice"
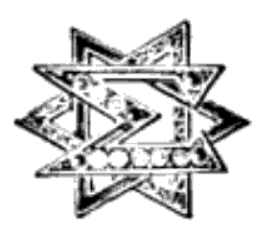
- Member badge
- Colors: Blue and Garnet
- Publication: Desmos
- Chapters: 33
- Headquarters: c/o Dr. John Prey, Supreme Scribe; 296 15th Avenue; Nekoosa, Wisconsin 54457; United States
- Website: www.deltsig.com

Delta Sigma Delta (ΔΣΔ) is an international professional dental fraternity. Founded in 1882, it is the oldest and largest of the professional dental fraternities.

== History ==
Delta Sigma Delta's inception came when Louis James "Lou" Mitchell and Charles William Howard, dental students at the University of Michigan School of Dentistry in Ann Arbor, were invited to join the medical fraternity Nu Sigma Nu. They declined, instead opting to form the school's first professional dental fraternity.

On November 15, 1882, these two and five others from the dental school met at Mrs. Slattery's boarding house, located at #10 North State Street in Ann Arbor, Michigan. Along with Howard and Mitchell, the fraternity's founders were Francis Eugene Cassidy, Lyndall Llewellyn Davis, Clarence James Hand, Louis Manning "Jamie" James, and Ezra Lincoln Kern. Delta Sigma Delta was the first dental fraternity in the world.

Dr. L. L. Davis established the Beta chapter at the Chicago College of Dental Surgery after establishing his dental practice in Chicago. Within a month of each other, Epsilon chapter was chartered at the University of Pennsylvania School of Dental Medicine, followed by Gamma chapter at Harvard University.

After graduation, the fraternity's founders took positions in multiple cities. This led to the formation of a supreme or alumni chapter, in Detroit, Michigan in 1895.

== Symbols ==
The Greek letters ΔΣΔ represent the letters D.D.S. of the dental degree, although with a transposed sequence. The fraternity's colors are blue and garnet. Its motto is "Knowledge, Strength, Justice".

== Governance ==
The Supreme Chapter is the fraternity's administrative or governing body. A Council of Graduate Chapters oversees the graduate chapters. The European Continental Chapter oversees the European graduate chapters and the Australia/New Zealand Chapter oversees the graduate chapters there.

== Chapters ==
As of 2021, there were 44 active chapters. Undergraduate or collegiate chapters are located at dental schools, while graduate chapters are located in population centers throughout the United States and in Canada, Europe, Australia, and New Zealand.

=== Undergraduate chapters ===
Following is a list of the collegiate chapters of Delta Sigma Delta, with active chapters indicated in bold and inactive chapters and institutions in italics.

Chapter	Charter date and range	Institution	Location	Status	Ref.
**Alpha**	November 15, 1882	University of Michigan School of Dentistry	Ann Arbor, Michigan	Active	
Beta	March 24, 1885 –1993	Loyola University Chicago	Chicago, Illinois	Inactive	(Note: Chapter formed at the Chicago College of Dental Surgery which merged with Loyola in 1923. The chapter closed in 1993.)
**Epsilon**	February 21, 1891	University of Pennsylvania School of Dental Medicine	Philadelphia, Pennsylvania	Active	
Gamma	March 6, 1891 – 1944	Harvard School of Dental Medicine	Boston, Massachusetts	Inactive	
Delta				Unassigned	
**Zeta**	November 21, 1891	UCSF School of Dentistry	San Francisco, California	Active	
Eta	October 24, 1893 – 2001	Northwestern University Dental School	Evanston, Illinois	Inactive	(Note: The dental school closed in 2001)
**Theta**	February 16, 1896	University of Minnesota School of Dentistry	Minneapolis, Minnesota	Active	
Iota	February 16, 1896 – 1908	University of Detroit Mercy School of Dentistry	Detroit, Michigan	Inactive	
Kappa	November 26, 1896 – 1926	Vanderbilt University	Nashville, Tennessee	Inactive	(Note: The dental school closed in the late 1920s)
**Lambda**	January 16, 1897	Case School of Dental Medicine	Cleveland, Ohio	Active	
**Mu**	January 21, 1897	Tufts University School of Dental Medicine	Boston, Massachusetts	Active	
**Nu**	March 15, 1898	University of Missouri–Kansas City School of Dentistry	Kansas City, Missouri	Active	
**Xi**	January 6, 1900	Indiana University School of Dentistry	Indianapolis, Indiana	Active	
Omicron	February 15, 1901 – 19xx ?	Saint Louis University Dental School	St. Louis, Missouri	Inactive	(Note: The dental school closed in 1971)
Pi	October 8, 1901 – 19xx ?	University at Buffalo School of Dental Medicine	Buffalo, New York	Inactive	
**Rho**	December 9, 1900	University of Illinois Chicago College of Dentistry	Chicago, Illinois	Active	
**Sigma**	February 5, 1903	University of Pittsburgh School of Dental Medicine	Pittsburgh, Pennsylvania	Active	
Tau	February 15, 1901 – 1932	Ohio College of Dental Surgery	Cincinnati, Ohio	Inactive	(Note: The dental school closed in 1926.)
**Upsilon**	May 25, 1905	Washington University School of Dental Medicine	St. Louis, Missouri	Inactive	(Note: The dental school closed in 1991.)
Phi	February 8, 1905 – 1932	Colorado College of Dental Surgery	Denver, Colorado	Inactive	(Note: The dental school closed in 1932.)
**Chi**	February 24, 1906	Herman Ostrow School of Dentistry of USC	Los Angeles, California	Active	
**Psi**	April 11, 1907	Oregon Health & Science University School of Dentistry	Portland, Oregon	Active	
**Omega**	April 1, 1910	Creighton University School of Dentistry	Omaha, Nebraska	Active	
**Alpha Alpha**	January 11, 1912 – c. 1990	Georgetown University School of Dentistry	Washington, D.C.	Active	(Note: The dental school closed in 1990.)
Beta Beta	May 8, 1913 – ≤1977	University of Nebraska Medical Center College of Dentistry	Lincoln, Nebraska	Inactive	
**Gamma Gamma**	February 18, 1914	University of Iowa College of Dentistry	Iowa City, Iowa	Active	
Delta Delta				Unassigned	
**Epsilon Epsilon**	April 29, 1914	University of Louisville	Louisville, Kentucky	Active	
**Zeta Zeta**	June 3, 1917	Louisiana State University	New Orleans, Louisiana	Active	
**Eta Eta**	June 1, 1918	Marquette University School of Dentistry	Milwaukee, Wisconsin	Active	
**Theta Theta**	March 26, 1921	Atlanta Southern Dental College	Augusta, Georgia	Active	
Iota Iota				Unassigned	
**Kappa Kappa**	May 27, 1921	University of Tennessee College of Dentistry	Memphis, Tennessee	Active	
**Lambda Lambda**	May 27, 1922	Texas A&M University College of Dentistry	Dallas, Texas	Active	
**Mu Mu**	July 22, 1926	Ohio State University College of Dentistry	Columbus, Ohio	Active	
**Nu Nu**	November 22, 1926	University of the Pacific Arthur A. Dugoni School of Dentistry	San Francisco, California	Active	
Xi Xi	May 16, 1931 – 1938	University of Maryland School of Dentistry	Baltimore, Maryland	Inactive	
**Omicron Omicron**	December 16, 1931	VCU School of Dentistry	Richmond, Virginia	Active	
**Pi Pi**	April 29, 1939	University of Detroit Mercy School of Dentistry	Detroit, Michigan	Active	
**Rho Rho**	September 18, 1945	Maurice H. Kornberg School of Dentistry	Philadelphia, Pennsylvania	Active	
**Sigma Sigma**	January 14, 1948	University of Washington School of Dentistry	Seattle, Washington	Active	
**Tau Tau**	May 29, 1948	UTHealth School of Dentistry	Houston, Texas	Active	
**Upsilon Upsilon**	April 28, 1951	UNC Adams School of Dentistry	Chapel Hill, North Carolina	Active	
**Phi Phi**	May 24, 1952	UAB School of Dentistry	Birmingham, Alabama	Active	
**Chi Chi**	February 9, 1962	West Virginia University School of Dentistry	Morgantown, West Virginia	Active	
Psi Psi	1963–≤1977	University of Puerto Rico School of Dental Medicine	San Juan, Puerto Rico	Inactive	
**Omega Omega**	December 6, 1969	UCLA School of Dentistry	Los Angeles, California	Active	
Alpha Alpha				Unassigned	
**Alpha Beta**	March 19, 1973	Medical University of South Carolina College of Dental Medicine	Charleston, South Carolina	Active	
**Alpha Chi**	October 11, 1973	Dental School at the University of Texas Health Science Center at San Antonio	San Antonio, Texas	Active	
Alpha Gamma	1975–19xx ?	University of Florida College of Dentistry	Gainesville, Florida	Inactive	
**Alpha Delta**	May 1, 1976	University of Colorado School of Dental Medicine	Aurora, Colorado	Active	
Alpha Epsilon				Unassigned	
**Alpha Zeta**	November 15, 1984	University of Connecticut School of Dental Medicine	Farmington, Connecticut	Active	
**Alpha Kappa**	May 18, 1985	Southern Illinois University School of Dental Medicine	Alton, Illinois	Active	
**Alpha Lambda**	September 9, 1995	University of Oklahoma College of Dentistry	Oklahoma City, Oklahoma	Active	
**Alpha Mu**	May 17, 1998	Nova Southeastern University College of Dental Medicine	Fort Lauderdale, Florida	Active	
**Alpha Nu**	April 15, 2005	Arizona School of Dentistry and Oral Health	Mesa, Arizona	Active	
**Alpha Xi**	April 26, 2008	University of Kentucky College of Dentistry	Lexington, Kentucky	Active	
**Alpha Omicron**	2013	Midwestern University	Downers Grove, Illinois	Active	
**Alpha Pi**	2013	Western University of Health Sciences	Pomona, California	Active	
**Alpha Rho**	August 23, 2014	A.T. Still University Dental School	Kirksville, Missiouri	Active	

=== Graduate chapters ===
Following is a list of the Delta Sigma Delta international graduate chapters.

Chapter	Location	Status	Ref.
At-Large		Active	
Badger Graduate Chapter	Wisconsin	Active	
Baton Rouge Graduate Chapter	Baton Rouge, Louisiana	Active	
Belgium Graduate Chapter	Belgium	Active	
Canada Graduate Chapter	Canada	Active	
Cincinnati-Dayton Graduate Chapter	Cincinnati and Dayton, Ohio	Active	
Cleveland Graduate Chapter	Cleveland, Ohio	Active	
Columbus Graduate Chapter	Columbus, Ohio	Active	
Denver Graduate Chapter	Denver, Colorado	Active	
Detroit Graduate Chapter	Detroit, Michigan	Active	
ECC Graduate Chapter		Active	
Georgia Graduate Chapter	Georgia	Active	
Hawaii Graduate Chapter	Hawaii	Active	
Holland Graduate Chapter	Holland, Netherlands	Active	
Indiana Graduate Chapter	Indiana	Active	
London Graduate Chapter	London, England	Active	
New England Graduate Chapter		Active	
New Orleans Graduate Chapter	New Orleans, Louisiana	Active	
New South Wales Graduate Chapter	New South Wales, Australia	Active	
New York Graduate Chapter	New York	Active	
New Zealand Graduate Chapter	New Zealand	Active	
North Carolina Graduate Chapter	North Carolina	Active	
Oregon Graduate Chapter	Oregon	Active	
Paris Graduate Chapter	Paris, France	Active	
Pittsburgh Graduate Chapter	Pittsburgh, Pennsylvania	Active	
Queensland Graduate Chapter	Queensland, Australia	Active	
Rochester Graduate Chapter	Rochester, New York	Active	
San Francisco Graduate Chapter	San Francisco, California	Active	
Scandinavia Graduate Chapter		Active	
Seattle Graduate Chapter	Seattle, Washington	Active	
St. Louis Graduate Chapter	St. Louis, Missouri	Active	
South Australia Graduate Chapter	South Australia, Australia	Active	
Texas (East) Graduate Chapter	Texas	Active	
Twin Cities Graduate Chapter	Minneapolis and Saint Paul, Minnesota	Active	
Virginia Graduate Chapter	Virginia	Active	
West Virginia Graduate Chapter	West Virginia	Active	
Western Australia Graduate Chapter	Western Australia, Australia	Active	
Youngstown Graduate Chapter	Youngstown, Ohio	Active	

== See also ==
- List of dental schools in the United States
- List of defunct dental schools in the United States
- Professional fraternities and sororities
