= List of Alpha Omega chapters =

Alpha Omega is an international professional Jewish dental fraternity. It was founded in 1908 at the by Jewish students from three dental schools in Baltimore, Maryland. In 1932, it merged with Alpha Zeta Gamma, a similar organization.

== Collegiate chapters ==
This is a list of the collegiate chapters for Alpha Omega, with active chapters indicated in bold and inactive chapters and institutions in italics.

| Chapter | Charter date and range | Institution | Location | Status | Ref. |
|---|---|---|---|---|---|
| Zeta (see **Zeta-Mu**) | 1908–1923 | University of Maryland | Baltimore, Maryland | Consolidated | (Note: This was the first chapter to carry the name Alpha Omega, formed in 1908 as a Baltimore citywide fraternity for the students of three dental schools. When it merged with Ramach (local) on December 20, 1909, it became the Zeta chapter.) |
| Ramach (see **Theta-Ramach**) | December 20, 1909 – 1916 | Medico-Chirurgical College of Philadelphia | Philadelphia, Pennsylvania | Consolidated | (Note: This chapter originated as a local fraternity of the same name in 1907 at the Pennsylvania College of Dental Surgery. PCDS closed in June 1909. In October 1909, Ramach moved to the Medico-Chirurgical College of Philadelphia. On December 20, 1909, Ramach (local) merged with Zeta Omega (local) to form the national fraternity.) (Note: In 1916, Medico-Chirurgical College of Philadelphia merged with the University of Pennsylvania School of Dental Medicine. At that time, the Ramach and Theta chapters consolidated to form the Theta-Ramach chapter.) |
| **Beta** | October 9, 1910 | University of Pennsylvania School of Dental Medicine | Philadelphia, Pennsylvania | Active | |
| **Gamma** | 1911 | Tufts University School of Dental Medicine | Boston, Massachusetts | Active | |
| **Iota** | 1911 | New York University College of Dentistry | New York City, New York | Active | (Note: Chapter was originally called "Ididim", Hebrew for friend, and changed to Iota in 1918.) |
| Delta | 1912–19xx ? | Harvard School of Dental Medicine | Boston, Massachusetts | Inactive | |
| **Eta** | 1914 | Columbia University College of Dental Medicine | New York City, New York | Active | (Note: This chapter was originally called Achim and changed to Eta in 1918) |
| Theta (see **Theta-Ramach**) | 1914–1916 | Temple University | Philadelphia, Pennsylvania | Consolidated | |
| **Theta-Ramach** (see Theta and Ramach (Second)) | 1916 | Maurice H. Kornberg School of Dentistry | Philadelphia, Pennsylvania | Active | |
| Sigma | October 1916 – 1918 | Jersey City College of Dentistry | Jersey City, New Jersey | Inactive | (Note: With the school's closure, most students transferred to Epsilon chapter at Georgetown.) (Note: This school closed in 1918.) |
| **Alpha** | December 1916 | University at Buffalo School of Dental Medicine | Buffalo, New York | Active | |
| Epsilon | 1917–c. 1990 | Georgetown University School of Dentistry | Washington, D.C. | Inactive | (Note: Originally chartered at George Washington Dental College, a department of George Washington University. In 1904, what was then Columbian University changed its name to George Washington University, about a decade before the establishment of the chapter. The chapter originally accepted members from both George Washington University and Georgetown Dental College. The chapter officially moved to Georgetown University after the closure of the George Washington Dental School (a department of GWU) in May 1920. The Georgetown Dental School closed in 1990.) |
| Kappa (see **Kappa-Nu**) | 1918–1929 | University of the Pacific School of Dentistry | San Francisco, California | Consolidated | |
| Lambda (First) (see Lambda (Second)) | 1919–1945 | North Pacific College | Portland, Oregon | Moved | (Note: North Pacific College's dental program was purchased by the state of Oregon in 1945 and merged into the University of Oregon School of Medicine. It is now the Oregon Health & Science University School of Dentistry.) |
| Mu (see **Zeta-Mu**) | 1919–1923 | Baltimore College of Dental Surgery | Baltimore, Maryland | Consolidated | (Note: This school merged into the University of Maryland in 1923, prompting the mergers of Zeta and Mu chapters that year.) |
| Nu (see **Kappa-Nu**) | 1920–1929 | UCSF School of Dentistry | San Francisco, California | Consolidated | (Note: First formed at the nearby University of California.) |
| Xi | 1920–1926 | Colorado College of Dental Surgery | Denver, Colorado | Inactive | (Note: This school closed in 1926.) |
| Omicron | 1920–1988 | University of Pittsburgh School of Dental Medicine | Pittsburgh, Pennsylvania | Inactive | |
| **Pi** | 1921 | Faculty of Dentistry, University of Toronto | Toronto, Ontario, Canada | Active | |
| Rho | 1922–c. 1968 | University of Minnesota School of Dentistry | Minneapolis, Minnesota | Inactive | (Note: This chapter originated as Tau Beta Phi (local) in 1920.) |
| **Zeta-Mu** | 1923 | University of Maryland School of Dentistry | College Park, Maryland | Active | (Note: Result of the merger of Zeta and Mu chapters.) |
| **Tau** | 1924 | USC Herman Ostrow School of Dentistry | Los Angeles, California | Active | |
| Upsilon | 1924–1987 | Marquette University School of Dentistry | Milwaukee, Wisconsin | Inactive | |
| Phi | 1925–1987 | University of Louisville School of Dentistry | Louisville, Kentucky | Inactive | |
| **Chi** | 1926 | University of Michigan School of Dentistry | Ann Arbor, Michigan | Active | |
| **Psi** | May 15, 1927 | Ohio State University College of Dentistry | Columbus, Ohio | Active | |
| Alpha Alpha | 1928–xxxx ? | University of Illinois Chicago College of Dentistry | Chicago, Illinois | Inactive | |
| Alpha Beta | 1928–xxxx ? | VCU School of Dentistry | Richmond, Virginia | Inactive | |
| **Alpha Gamma** | 1928 | Indiana University School of Dentistry | Indianapolis, Indiana | Active | |
| Alpha Delta | 1928–1988 | Emory University School of Dentistry | Atlanta, Georgia | Inactive | (Note: Emory's dental school closed in the early 1990s.) |
| Alpha Epsilon | 1929–1991 | Washington University School of Dental Medicine | St. Louis, Missouri | Inactive | (Note: Washington University's dental school closed in 1991.) |
| **Kappa-Nu** | 1929 | UCSF School of Dentistry | San Francisco, California | Active | (Note: Result of merger of Kappa and Nu chapters.) |
| **Kappa-Nu** | 1929 | University of the Pacific Arthur A. Dugoni School of Dentistry | San Francisco, California | Active | (Note: Result of merger of Kappa and Nu chapters.) |
| Alpha Eta | February 14, 1931 – xxxx ? | University of Iowa College of Dentistry | Iowa City, Iowa | Inactive | |
| Alpha Iota | April 22, 1931 – xxxx ? | University of Missouri–Kansas City School of Dentistry | Kansas City, Missouri | Inactive | (Note: Originated as The Pulp Club (local) in 1929.) |
| Alpha Theta | 1932–c. 1971 | Loyola University New Orleans Dental School | New Orleans, Louisiana | Inactive | (Note: Loyola's dental school was closed in 1971.) |
| Alpha Kappa | October 7, 1932 – xxxx ? | Northwestern University Dental School | Evanston, Illinois | Active | (Note: Originated as the Beta chapter of Alpha Zeta Gamma, formed in 1914. A separate group of petitioners for a chapter of Alpha Omega was held in abeyance while the pending matter of a national merger was effected. Both groups were initiated to become the Alpha Kappa chapter of Alpha Omega.) |
| Alpha Lambda | October 7, 1932 – c. 1993 | Loyola University School of Dentistry | Chicago, Illinois | Inactive | (Note: Originated as the Alpha chapter of Alpha Zeta Gamma, formed on October 1, 1910, at the Chicago College of Dental Surgery. That school had briefly affiliated with Lake Forest University, then with Valparaiso, an arrangement that ended following WWI. It was independent for almost a decade until a 1926 merger with Loyola of Chicago. The Loyola Dental School closed in 1993.) |
| Alpha Mu | 1932–19xx ? | Dalhousie University Faculty of Dentistry | Halifax, Nova Scotia, Canada | Inactive | |
| **Alpha Nu** | 1933 | University of Detroit Mercy School of Dentistry | Detroit, Michigan | Active | |
| Alpha Zeta | 1935–1984 | University of Tennessee College of Dentistry | Memphis, Tennessee | Inactive | |
| **Omega** | 1936 | Case School of Dental Medicine | Cleveland, Ohio | Active | |
| Alpha Chi | 1945–19xx ?, 1988–19xx ? | Texas A&M University College of Dentistry | Dallas, Texas | Inactive | (Note: Originally at Baylor College of Dentistry) |
| Lambda (Second) (see Lambda (First)) | 1945–19xx ? | Oregon Health & Science University School of Dentistry | Portland, Oregon | Inactive | |
| **Alpha Pi** | 1956 | McGill University Faculty of Dentistry | Montreal, Quebec, Canada | Active | |
| **Alpha Sigma** | 1958 | Hebrew University-Hadassah School of Dental Medicine | Jerusalem, Israel | Active | |
| National Undergraduate Chapter | 1959–19xx ? | Howard University College of Dentistry | Washington, D.C. | Inactive | |
| Alpha Psi | 1959–19xx ? | Seton Hall University | South Orange, New Jersey | Inactive | |
| Alpha Rho | 1959–19xx ? | University of Manitoba | Winnipeg, Manitoba, Canada | Inactive | |
| Alpha Upsilon | 1960–19xx ? | UAB School of Dentistry | Birmingham, Alabama | Inactive | |
| **Alpha Tau** | 1970 | UCLA School of Dentistry | Los Angeles, California | Active | |
| Beta Alpha | 1971–19xx ? | Meharry Medical College School of Dentistry | Nashville, Tennessee | Inactive | |
| Beta Beta | 1974–19xx ? | University of Florida College of Dentistry | Gainesville, Florida | Inactive | |
| Beta Chi | 1975–1988 | Harwood University | Washington, D.C. | Inactive | |
| **Beta Delta** | 1976 | Schulich School of Medicine and Dentistry | London, Ontario, Canada | Active | |
| **Beta Epsilon** | 1977 | Boston University School of Dental Medicine | Boston, Massachusetts | Active | |
| Beta Eta | 1979–1988 | UTHealth School of Dentistry | Houston, Texas | Inactive | |
| Beta Gamma | 1980–19xx ? | UT Health San Antonio School of Dentistry | San Antonio, Texas | Inactive | |
| **Beta Iota** | 1980 | University of Colorado School of Dental Medicine | Aurora, Colorado | Active | |
| Beta Kappa | 1982–19xx ? | Tel Aviv University | Tel Aviv, Israel | Inactive | |
| Beta Lambda | 1984–19xx ? | University of Connecticut School of Dental Medicine | Farmington, Connecticut | Inactive | |
| Sigma Beta | 1986–19xx ? | Stony Brook University School of Dental Medicine | Stony Brook, New York | Inactive | |
| Delta Rho | 1987– c. 1900 | Fairleigh Dickinson University School of Dentistry | Rutherford, New Jersey | Inactive | (Note: The Fairleigh Dickinson School of Dentistry closed in 1990.) |
| Beta Upsilon | 1990–19xx ? | University of Buenos Aires | Buenos Aires, Argentina | Inactive | |
| Sigma Alpha | 1990–19xx ? | University of the Witwatersrand | Johannesburg, South Africa | Inactive | |
| **Tau Alpha Mu** | 19xx ? | Nova Southeastern University College of Dental Medicine | Fort Lauderdale, Florida | Active | |
| **Capítulo Lambda** | 19xx ? | University of Monterrey | Monterrey, Nuevo León, Mexico | Active | |
| **Gamma Beta** | 19xx ? | Midwestern University College of Dental Medicine | Downers Grove, Illinois | Active | |
| **Nu Gamma** | 19xx ? | UNC Adams School of Dentistry | Chapel Hill, North Carolina | Active | |
| **Nu Epsilon** | 19xx ? | UNE College of Dental Medicine | Portland, Maine | Active | |

== Alumni chapters ==
The following are the alumni chapters of Alpha Omega.

| Chapter | Location | Status | Ref. |
|---|---|---|---|
| Atlanta | Atlanta, Georgia | Active | |
| Baltimore | Baltimore, Maryland | Active | |
| Alsace-Strasbourg | Alsace, France and Strasburg, Germany | Active | |
| Belgium | Belgium | Active | |
| Boston | Boston, Massachusetts | Active | |
| Brooklyn | Brooklyn, New York | Active | |
| Buffalo-Gilead | Buffalo, New York | Active | |
| Calgary | Calgary, Alberta, Canada | Active | |
| Cincinnati | Cincinnati, Ohio | Active | |
| Cleveland | Cleveland, Ohio | Active | |
| Columbus | Columbus, Ohio | Active | |
| Dallas | Dallas, Texas | Active | |
| Denver | Denver, Colorado | Active | |
| Detroit | Detroit, Michigan | Active | |
| Greater Phoenix | Phoenix, Arizona | Active | |
| Grenoble | Grenoble, Auvergne-Rhône-Alpes, France | Active | |
| Haifa | Haifa, Israel | Active | |
| Hartford | Hartford, Connecticut | Active | |
| Houston | Houston, Texas | Active | |
| Illinois | Illinois | Active | |
| Indianapolis | Indianapolis, Indiana | Active | |
| Jerusalem | Jerusalem, Israel | Active | |
| London | London, England | Active | |
| Los Angeles | Los Angeles, California | Active | |
| Louisville | Louisville, Kentucky | Active | |
| Lyon | Lyon, France | Active | |
| Malmo | Malmö, Skåne County, Sweden | Active | |
| Manitoba | Manitoba, Canada | Active | |
| Marseille | Marseille, Provence-Alpes-Côte d'Azur, France | Active | |
| Milwaukee | Milwaukee, Wisconsin | Active | |
| Minnesota | Minnesota | Active | |
| Montreal | Montreal, Quebec, Canada | Active | |
| New York | New York City, New York | Active | |
| Nice | Nice, Alpes-Maritimes, France | Active | |
| Orlando | Orlando, Florida | Active | |
| Ottawa | Ottawa, Ontario, Canada | Active | |
| Paris | Paris, Île-de-France, France | Active | |
| Philadelphia | Philadelphia, Pennsylvania | Active | |
| Pittsburgh | Pittsburgh, Pennsylvania | Active | |
| Queens-Nassau | Queens and Nassau County, New York | Active | |
| Rochester-Gilead | Rochester, New York | Active | |
| San Fernando | San Fernando, California | Active | |
| San Francisco | San Francisco, California | Active | |
| Seattle | Seattle, Washington | Active | |
| South Florida | South Florida | Active | |
| St. Louis | St. Louis, Missouri | Active | |
| Suffolk | Suffolk, Virginia | Active | |
| Tel Aviv | Tel Aviv, Israel | Active | |
| Toronto | Toronto, Ontario, Canada | Active | |
| Toulouse | Toulouse, Occitania, France | Active | |
| Vancouver | Vancouver, British Columbia, Canada | Active | |
| Washington D.C | Washington, D.C. | Active | |
| Westchester | Westchester County, New York | Active | |
| Zurich | Zurich, Switzerland | Active | |
