= List of dental schools in the United States =

This list of dental schools in the U.S. includes major academic institutions in the U.S. that award advanced professional degrees of either D.D.S. or D.M.D. in the field of dentistry. It does not include schools of medicine, and it includes 75 schools of dentistry in 37 states, the District of Columbia, and Puerto Rico. These dental schools are a mix of stand-alone institutions and colleges within universities or associated with medical schools.

== Alabama ==
- UAB School of Dentistry, Birmingham

== Arizona ==
- A.T. Still University, the Arizona School of Dentistry and Oral Health, Mesa
- Midwestern University College of Dental Medicine-Arizona, Glendale

== Arkansas ==
- Lyon College School of Dental Medicine, Little Rock

== California ==
- California Northstate University College of Dental Medicine, Elk Grove
- Herman Ostrow School of Dentistry of USC, Los Angeles
- Loma Linda University School of Dentistry, Loma Linda
- University of California, Los Angeles School of Dentistry, Los Angeles
- University of California, San Francisco School of Dentistry, San Francisco
- University of the Pacific Arthur A. Dugoni School of Dentistry, San Francisco
- Western University of Health Sciences College of Dental Medicine, Pomona

== Colorado ==
- University of Colorado School of Dental Medicine, Aurora

== Connecticut ==
- University of Connecticut School of Dental Medicine at University of Connecticut Health Center, Farmington

== District of Columbia ==
- Howard University College of Dentistry, Washington

== Florida ==
- LECOM School of Dental Medicine, Bradenton
- Nova Southeastern University College of Dental Medicine, Ft. Lauderdale
- University of Florida College of Dentistry, Gainesville

== Georgia ==
- The Dental College of Georgia at Augusta University, Augusta

== Illinois ==
- Midwestern University College of Dental Medicine, Downers Grove
- Southern Illinois University School of Dental Medicine, Alton
- University of Illinois at Chicago College of Dentistry, Chicago

== Indiana ==
- Indiana University School of Dentistry, Indianapolis

== Iowa ==
- University of Iowa College of Dentistry, Iowa City

== Kentucky ==
- University of Kentucky College of Dentistry, Lexington
- University of Louisville School of Dentistry, Louisville
- University of Pikeville School of Dentistry, Pikeville

== Louisiana ==
- Louisiana State University School of Dentistry, New Orleans

== Maine ==
- University of New England College of Dental Medicine, Portland

== Maryland ==
- University of Maryland School of Dentistry (Baltimore), founded as the Baltimore College of Dental Surgery, Baltimore

== Massachusetts ==
- Boston University Henry M. Goldman School of Dental Medicine, Boston
- Harvard School of Dental Medicine, Boston
- Tufts University School of Dental Medicine, Boston

== Michigan ==
- University of Michigan School of Dentistry, Ann Arbor
- University of Detroit Mercy School of Dentistry, Detroit

== Minnesota ==
- University of Minnesota School of Dentistry, Minneapolis

== Mississippi ==
- University of Mississippi Medical Center School of Dentistry, Jackson

== Missouri ==
- Kansas City University College of Dental Medicine, Joplin
- University of Missouri–Kansas City School of Dentistry, Kansas City
- A.T. Still University Missouri School of Dentistry & Oral Health, Kirksville

== Nebraska ==
- Creighton University School of Dentistry, Omaha
- University of Nebraska Medical Center College of Dentistry, Lincoln

== Nevada ==
- University of Nevada at Las Vegas School of Dental Medicine, Las Vegas
- Roseman University of Health Sciences College of Dental Medicine, Las Vegas

== New Jersey ==
- Rutgers School of Dental Medicine, Newark (formerly University of Medicine and Dentistry of New Jersey - UMDNJ)

== New York ==
- Columbia University College of Dental Medicine, New York City
- New York University College of Dentistry, New York City
- Stony Brook University School of Dental Medicine, Stony Brook
- Touro College of Dental Medicine at New York Medical College, Hawthorne
- University at Buffalo School of Dental Medicine, Buffalo
- Eastman Institute for Oral Health, Rochester
- Yeshiva University College of Dental Medicine, New York City

== North Carolina ==
- East Carolina University School of Dental Medicine, Greenville
- University of North Carolina at Chapel Hill Adams School of Dentistry, Chapel Hill
- High Point University, Workman School of Dental Medicine, High Point

== Ohio ==
- Case Western Reserve University School of Dental Medicine, Cleveland
- The Ohio State University College of Dentistry, Columbus
- Northeast Ohio Medical University-Bitonte College of Dentistry, Rootstown

== Oklahoma ==
- University of Oklahoma College of Dentistry, Oklahoma City

== Oregon ==
- Oregon Health & Science University School of Dentistry, Portland

== Pennsylvania ==
- Temple University, Maurice H. Kornberg School of Dentistry, Philadelphia
- University of Pennsylvania School of Dental Medicine, Philadelphia
- University of Pittsburgh School of Dental Medicine, Pittsburgh

== Puerto Rico ==
- University of Puerto Rico School of Dental Medicine, San Juan

== South Carolina ==
- Medical University of South Carolina James B. Edwards College of Dental Medicine, Charleston

== Tennessee ==
- Meharry Medical College School of Dentistry, Nashville
- University of Tennessee Health Sciences Center College of Dentistry, Memphis
- Lincoln Memorial University, College of Dental Medicine, Knoxville

== Texas ==
- Texas A&M University College of Dentistry, Texas A&M Health Science Center, Dallas
- UT Health San Antonio, School of Dentistry, San Antonio
- University of Texas Health Science Center at Houston School of Dentistry, Houston
- Woody L. Hunt School of Dental Medicine, Texas Tech University Health Sciences Center El Paso, El Paso

== Utah ==
- Roseman University of Health Sciences College of Dental Medicine, South Jordan
- University of Utah School of Dentistry, Salt Lake City

== Virginia ==
- Virginia Commonwealth University School of Dentistry, Richmond

== Washington ==
- Pacific Northwest University School of Dental Medicine, Yakima (Opening August 2025)
- University of Washington School of Dentistry, Seattle

== West Virginia ==
- West Virginia University School of Dentistry, Charleston and Morgantown (main campus)

== Wisconsin ==
- Marquette University School of Dentistry, Milwaukee

== See also ==
- American Dental Education Association
- American Student Dental Association
- List of colleges and universities in the United States
- List of medical schools in the United States
- List of dental organizations in the United States
- List of defunct dental schools in the United States
