= Brian Jankowski =

American football and basketball player (born 1988)

No. 13
- Positions: Tight end, fullback, basketball practice player

Personal information
- Born: December 30, 1988 (age 37); Idaho Falls, Idaho, U.S.
- Listed height: 6 ft 4 in (1.93 m)
- Listed weight: 240 lb (109 kg)

Career information
- High school: Skyline (Idaho Falls)
- College: Weber State

Awards and highlights
- 2× Football Big Sky All-Conference

Brian Patrick Jankowski (born December 30, 1988) is an American former NCAA Division I football and basketball player for Weber State University. He played tight end for five years at the NCAA Division I FCS level and one season of basketball at the NCAA Division I level. He is currently training to become an American General Dentist and is set to graduate in 2019 from Arizona School of Dentistry and Oral Health in Mesa, Arizona.

== College career ==
Brian Jankowski appeared in 35 career games with the Wildcats and had 28 receptions for 225 yards and two touchdowns.

He was recruited by Colton Swan and Ron McBride.

Brian Jankowski red-shirted his first season with the Wildcats. His next season was more productive where he had two catches for 27 yards and received Academic All-Conference. In his red-shirt sophomore year he started 11 games and had 10 catches for 89 yards including a touchdown against Texas Tech. He received Academic All-Conference as well as Big Sky All-Conference honors. In his next season he played in eight games and started in six games, while battling injuries during the season. He caught six balls for 40 yards earning Big Sky All-Conference honors as well as Academic All-Conference honors.

During the 2011–12 season he was a practice player with the Weber State men's basketball team where he made the travel squad and earned Academic All-Conference honors. His head coach was Randy Rahe, who when asked about Brian stated "He's tough—obviously", and he played alongside current NBA All-Star Damian Lillard.

During the spring of 2012, Weber State had a coaching change where they acquired John L. Smith. Under a new coaching staff Brian Jankowski was selected team captain, voted on by the players. John L. Smith left for Arkansas weeks before the start of the season based on a coaching scandal involving Bobby Petrino. The Wildcats then made Jody Sears the interim head coach for Brian's senior season. Brian Jankowski started all 11 games and had 10 receptions for 69 yards and one touchdown. 55 of which came against Fresno State during their season opener. He received Academic All-Conference honors for the fourth straight season.

== Professional career ==
Jankowski graduated in April 2012 with a B.S. degree in psychology and minors in chemistry and technical sales from Weber State University. He is currently pursuing his dental career at A.T. Still University in Mesa, Arizona. He is set to graduate in 2019 as a general dentist.
