= Michael A. Pikos =

American dentist

- Citizenship: United States
- Education: Ohio State University
- Occupation: Implant Oral and Maxillofacial Surgeon
- Known for: Founding Coastal Jaw Surgery and Pikos Institute

Michael A. Pikos is an American implant oral and maxillofacial surgeon known as the CEO/Founder of Coastal Jaw Surgery and Pikos Institute.

== Background and education ==
Pikos was born in Campbell, Ohio. He holds a BS degree in biology from the Ohio State University and a DDS degree from the Ohio State University College of Dentistry, Columbus, Ohio.

He did his residency in oral and maxillofacial surgery at University of Pittsburgh, Montefiore Hospital, Pittsburgh, Pennsylvania. He also completed an internship at Miami Valley Hospital, Dayton, Ohio.

== Career ==
Pikos has been in the field of implant surgery for years. In 1983, he founded Coastal Jaw Surgery. He also founded Pikos Institute in Trinity, Florida and Pinnacle Study Club of Tampa Bay.

Pikos lectures and speaks on various aspects of implantology throughout not only the US, but the world as well. He is on the Editorial Board of the Implant Dentistry Journal, and the Journal of Implant and Advanced Clinical Dentistry. He is the author of Bone Augmentation in Implant Dentistry: A Step-by-Step Guide to Predictable Alveolar Ridge and Sinus Grafting. He has written several published articles on implant oral and maxillofacial surgery.

=== Professorship ===
Pikos is an adjunct associate professor at the Department of Periodontology and Prosthodontics, University of Alabama at Birmingham. He is a courtesy clinician associate professor at the Department of Periodontology and Prosthodontics, University of Florida College of Dentistry.

He is also an adjunct professor, Department of Oral and Maxillofacial Surgery at:

- The Ohio State University College of Dentistry
- Nova Southeastern University College of Dental Medicine, and
- Aristotle University of Thessaloniki, Greece, School of Dentistry.

=== Diplomacy ===
Pikos is the scientific advisor on implants for the Kois Center. He is a diplomate of:

- The American Board of Oral and Maxillofacial Surgery
- The American Board or Oral Implantology/Implant Dentistry
- The International Congress of Oral Implantologists
- The American Academy of Osseointegration.

== Awards ==
- 2006 - Received the Aaron Gershkoff Memorial Award from the American Academy of Implant Dentistry
- 2015 - Received the Saul Schluger Memorial Award for Top Educator
- 2017 - First recipient of the Carl E. Misch Advanced Dental Implant Studies Education Award.

== See also ==
- Restorative dentistry
