= Delta Sigma Delta (house) =

Fraternity house in Ann Arbor, Michigan

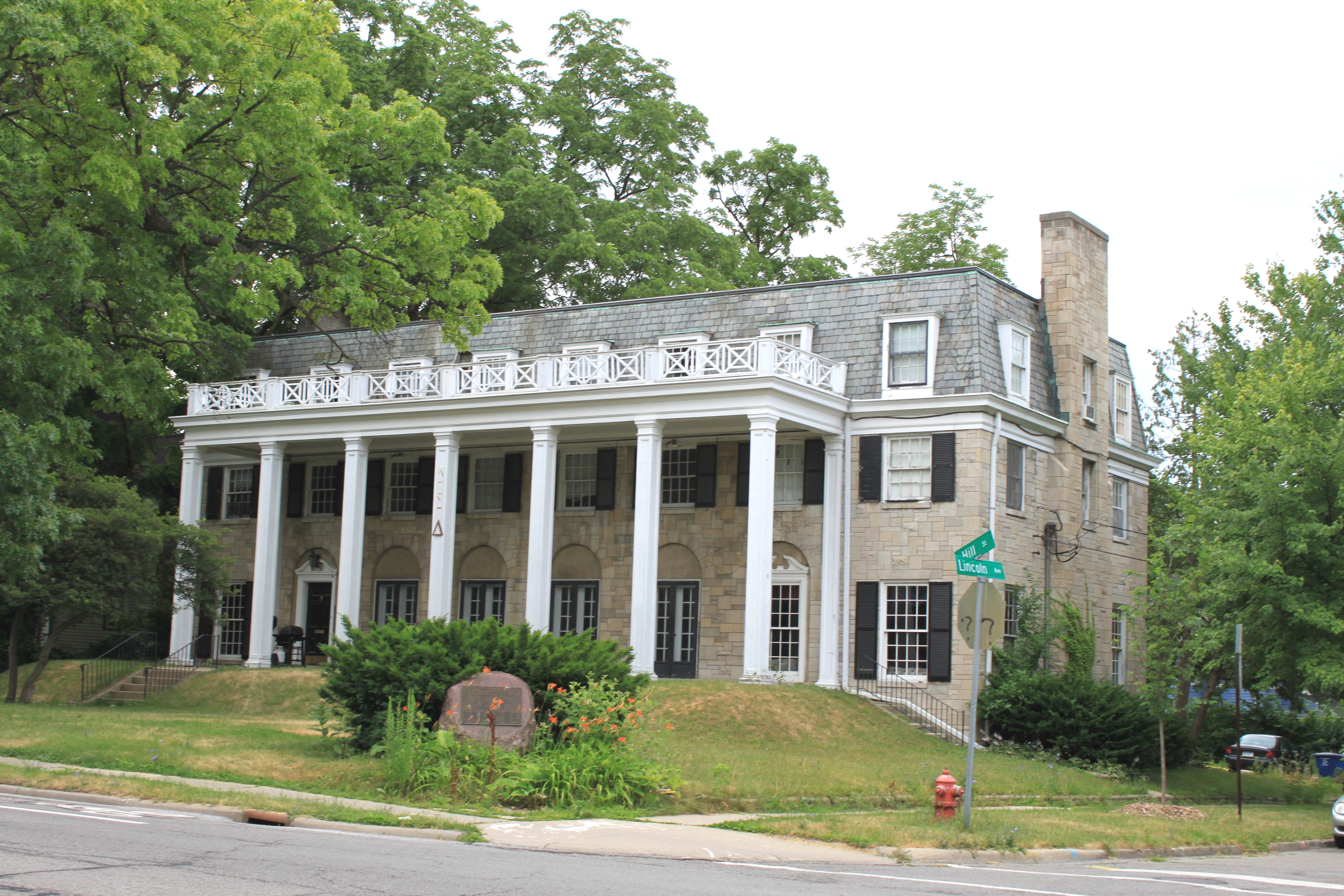
The Delta Sigma Delta house at 1502 Hill Street in 2011

The Delta Sigma Delta House is the chapter house of the Alpha Chapter of Delta Sigma Delta, a professional dental fraternity, at 1502 Hill Street in Ann Arbor, Michigan. The fraternity was founded in 1882 by dental students at the University of Michigan School of Dentistry. Ann Arbor's architectural survey dates the present house to 1931 and identifies its style as Georgian Colonial Revival. The house is part of the city's Washtenaw/Hill Historic District.

== Founding and early chapter house ==
The University of Michigan established the College of Dental Surgery in 1875. Seven years later, on November 15, 1882, a group of dental students formed Delta Sigma Delta in Ann Arbor. According to the fraternity's history, students Louis James Mitchell and Charles William Howard had been invited to join the medical fraternity Nu Sigma Nu. They declined and met with five other dental students at Mrs. Slattery's boarding house on North State Street to organize a dental fraternity. The founders formed the Alpha Chapter and drew the fraternity's name from the initials of the Doctor of Dental Surgery degree, rearranged as D.S.D.

In 1898, Edwin H. Humphrey's The Michigan Book recorded the Alpha Chapter at 624 Packard Street and reported that it was raising money for a building. The book published a roll of 156 regular members and identified several honorary initiates, including orthodontist Calvin S. Case. It also listed Louis Phillips Hall, who graduated from the university's dental school in 1889 and joined its faculty that year.

== Hill Street property and architecture ==
In Ann Arbor: The Changing Scene, local historian Adam Christman identified an earlier house at the southeast corner of Hill Street and Lincoln Avenue. He wrote that the property had belonged to James Craig, a faculty member at the University of Michigan Law School, and that Kappa Kappa Gamma occupied the house in 1909. Delta Sigma Delta later acquired the property and built its chapter house on the site.

The Alpha Chapter dates its use of 1502 Hill Street to 1914, and the 1915 Ann Arbor city directory lists Delta Sigma Delta at that address. The chapter's history gives 1929 as the year it began occupying the current house. The city's architectural survey gives 1931 for the present building and classifies it as Georgian Colonial Revival.

== Historic district ==
Ann Arbor established the Washtenaw/Hill Historic District in 1980 with five properties. In 1986, the city expanded it to include properties in the 1300, 1400, and 1500 blocks of Hill Street and one property at the corner of Washtenaw Avenue. The preservation ordinance lists the Delta Sigma Delta property at 1502 Hill Street among the parcels in the district. A later city survey classified the house as a significant property and recorded the fraternity as the first occupant of the present building.

== Centennial plaque ==
A plaque at the Hill Street property dated November 15, 1982, commemorates the hundredth anniversary of the fraternity's founding. It names ten charter members: Ezra Lincoln Kern, Lyndal Llewellyn Davis, Louis James Mitchell, Louis Manning James, Clarence James Hand, Donald Douglas Magill, Charles William Howard, William Cleland, Francis Eugene Cassidy, and Charles Phillip Weinrich.

== George Washington Park and the Rock ==
George Washington Park is a small public park at Hill Street and Washtenaw Avenue, near the chapter house. Louis Phillips Hall, the early Alpha Chapter member and dental faculty member, donated the land to the city in 1911. In 1932, Ann Arbor parks superintendent Eli Gallup brought a glacial limestone boulder from a gravel pit near Pontiac Trail to the site as a memorial to the 200th anniversary of George Washington's birth. A truck supplied by Detroit Edison moved the boulder, and Gallup buried a time capsule beneath the memorial.

In 1939, a shield-shaped plaque made by University High School students from salvaged metal was mounted on the side of the Rock facing Washtenaw Avenue. Its inscription refers to the 1932 commemoration. The exact start of the painting tradition is uncertain. The Bentley Historical Library traces reports of painting to about the mid-1950s, and layers of paint now cover the plaque.
