= West Virginia University School of Dentistry =

Dental school in Morgantown, West Virginia, US

Coordinates: 39°39′13.3″N 79°57′26.8″W

- Type: Public university
- Established: 1957
- Dean: Stephen M. Pachuta
- Location: Morgantown, West Virginia, U.S.
- Website: dentistry.hsc.wvu.edu

The West Virginia University School of Dentistry is the dental school of West Virginia University. It is located in the United States city of Morgantown, West Virginia. The school opened its doors in 1957 and is the only dental school in West Virginia.

== History ==
West Virginia University School of Dentistry, a part of West Virginia University was established in 1957. The school has graduated over 1542 dentists and 599 dental hygienists. More than 80% of graduates choose to practice in West Virginia. As of 2023, the number of graduates who choose to practice dentistry in West Virginia is increasing.

== See also ==
- American Student Dental Association
