= UNLV School of Dental Medicine =

Dental school of the University of Nevada Las Vegas

Coordinates: 36.160132°N 115.164766°W

- Other names: UNLV SDM
- Type: Public
- Established: 2001; 25 years ago
- Dean: James Mah, Interim Dean
- Students: 318
- Location: Las Vegas, Nevada, U.S.
- Tuition: Resident: $17,550 per semester Non-resident: $26,826, per semester (3 semesters per year)
- Website: unlv.edu/dental

University of Nevada, Las Vegas (UNLV) School of Dental Medicine is the dental school of the University of Nevada Las Vegas (UNLV). The school is located on the Shadow Lane Campus, located just east of University Medical Center of Southern Nevada on Charleston and Shadow Lane, in Las Vegas, Nevada. The school enrolls, on average, 80 freshmen per year.

== See also ==
- American Student Dental Association
