= UCLA School of Dentistry =

Dental school in Los Angeles, California, US

Coordinates: 34.06676°N 118.44248°W

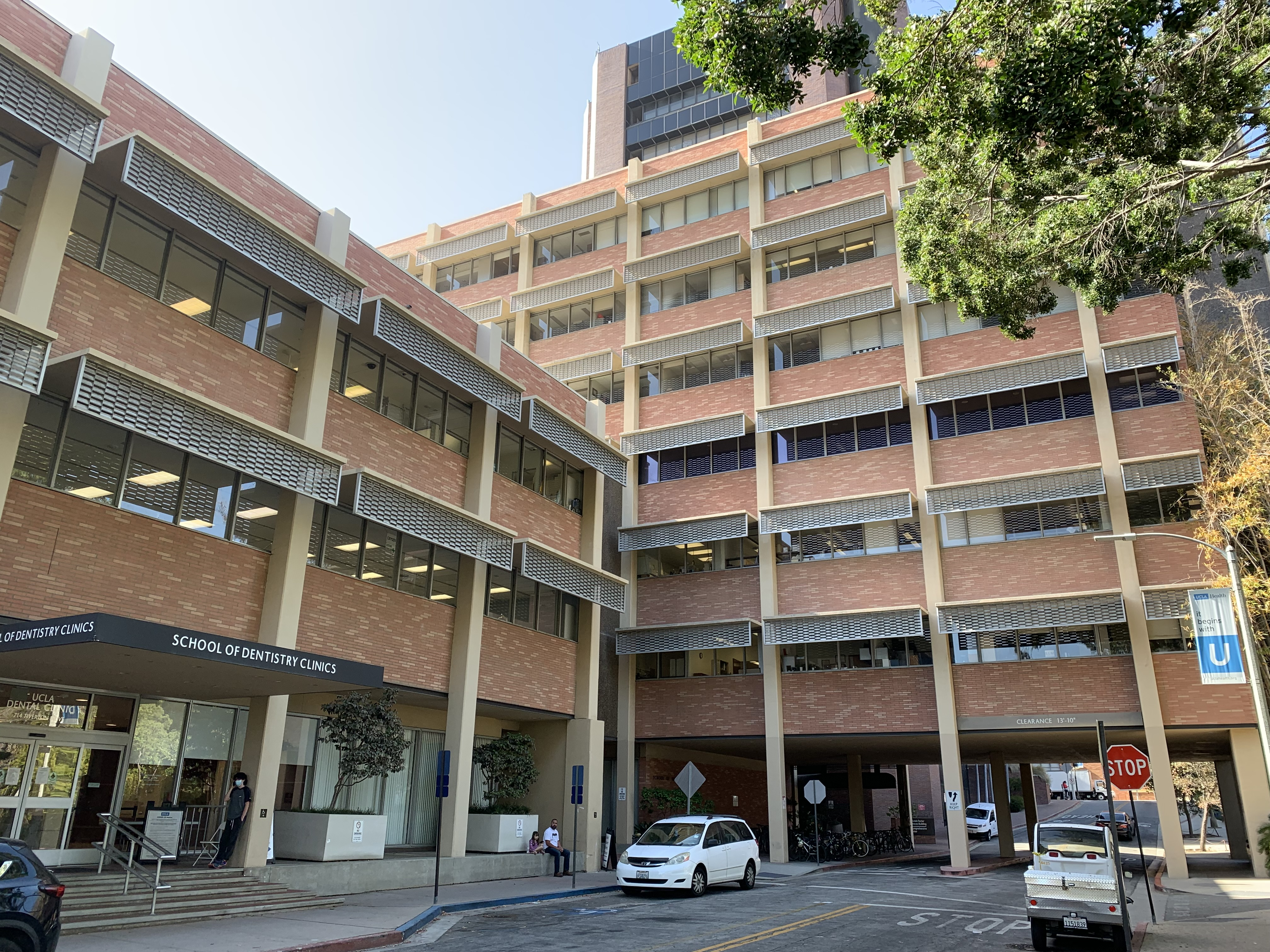
- Motto: Fiat lux (Latin)
- Motto in English: "Let there be light"
- Type: Public dental school
- Established: 1964
- Parent institution: University of California, Los Angeles
- Dean: Paul Krebsbach
- Students: 376 (predoctoral)
- Location: Westwood, Los Angeles, California, United States
- Campus: Urban
- Website: dentistry.ucla.edu
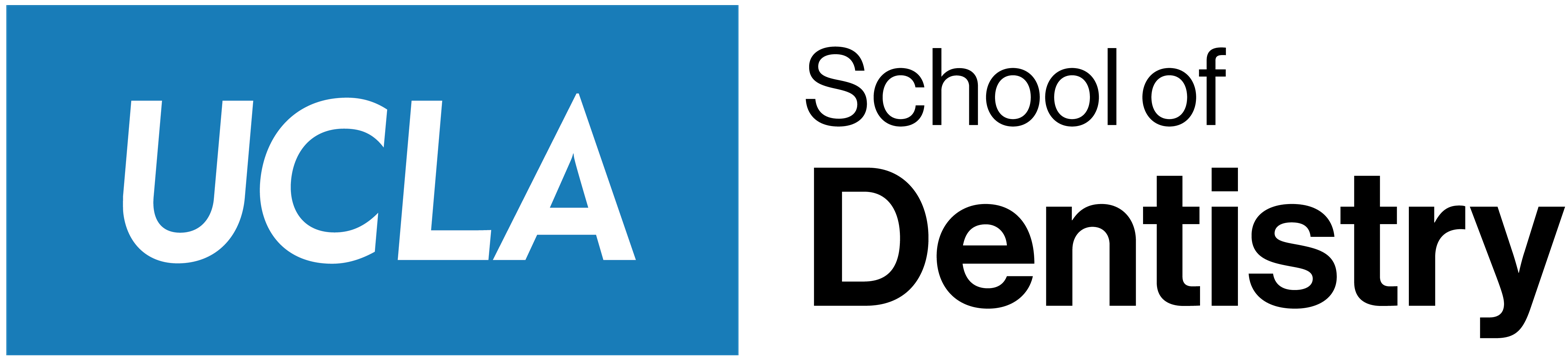

The UCLA School of Dentistry is the dental school of the University of California, Los Angeles (UCLA) located in the Center for Health Sciences building in the Westwood neighborhood of Los Angeles, California, United States. The school has several educational and training programs, conducts oral and dental health research, and offers affordable dental care at three locations: Westwood, Venice, and Inglewood. The school also participates in several outreach endeavors, including numerous health fairs during the year, STEM pipeline programs and provides dental care for underserved populations in the region. The School of Dentistry is considered among the nation's best research-intensive dental schools.

In 2014 alone, new faculty grants and contracts awarded totaled nearly $20 million from the National Institutes of Health and other funding agencies. The school enrolls, on average, 88 doctoral candidates per year. Additionally, 20 foreign trained dentists are added to each class at the beginning of the third year. Accepted students have highly competitive grade point averages and dental admission test scores. Out of all 62 US dental schools for 2016, UCLA's average matriculant DAT score of 23 ranks second in the nation - behind Harvard and tied with Columbia. UCLA School of Dentistry's average GPA of 3.77 ranks second.

== History ==
The UCLA School of Dentistry was established in 1964 in response to the need for an additional public school of dentistry in the greater Los Angeles area. The Class of 1968 was the first graduating class, with 28 Doctor of Dental Surgery (DDS) degrees awarded. Over time, the school has grown and transformed. One aspect that is very different is the student body's demographics. The first class had only one female student. In the 1970s, the administration pushed to diversify the student body. Today, the class is roughly 50 percent male and 50 percent female.

== Academic divisions ==
The UCLA School of Dentistry is organized into four academic divisions.

Regenerative and Reconstructive Sciences	Diagnostic and Surgical Sciences	Preventive and Restorative Sciences	Oral and Systemic Health Sciences
Periodontics	Oral & Maxillofacial Surgery & Dental Anesthesiology	Restorative Dentistry	Biosystems and Function
Prosthodontics	Interdisciplinary Dentistry	Pediatric Dentistry	Public and Population Health
Endodontics	Oral Medicine, Oral Pathology & Orofacial Pain		
Orthodontics	Oral & Maxillofacial Radiology		
Special Patient Care & Maxillofacial Prosthetics			

== Degrees and specializations ==
=== Four-year dental degree ===
- The school offers a four-year DDS program for candidates that have completed the DAT test and have gone through the formal application process. The program runs for 45 months and is broken up into 12 quarters and three required nine-week summer sessions. Each quarter is 10 weeks long.
- The school has slots for a total of 88 students and the program culminates with a commencement ceremony every June for fourth year dental students that have completed the didactic and clinical curriculum.
- The first two years of curriculum consist of a biomedical sciences foundation along with preclinical laboratory courses. Patient care begins early in the second year.
- The clinical curriculum focuses on patient care and is competency-based with additional clinical experience provided by rotations to specialty and community clinics.

=== Two-year dental degree (for foreign-trained dentists) ===
The school also offers a fully integrated, two-year advanced DDS program for foreign-trained dentists called the Professional Program for International Dentists (PPID). This program begins in late May of each year and runs for a minimum of 25 consecutive months. There are 30 slots available for qualified foreign-trained dentists. The program is specifically designed for those who want to obtain a DDS degree by a U.S. accredited dental school. Graduates of the PPID program are eligible to take the dental licensing examinations throughout most of the U.S.

=== Post-DDS ===
==== Postgraduate training (residency) programs ====
The School of Dentistry has 15 postgraduate training programs for dentists who have graduated from a U.S. or Canadian dental school. The training program is for those who want to pursue an advanced training certificate, and programs vary in length from one year to six years. Domestic trainees receive a stipend in addition to a benefits packet. International trainees pay fees to participate.

The 15 postgraduate training programs include Advanced Education in General Dentistry (Westwood & Venice), Advanced Prosthodontics, Dental Anesthesiology, Endodontics, General Practice, Maxillofacial Prosthetics, Oral & Maxillofacial Radiology, Oral & Maxillofacial Surgery, Oral & Maxillofacial Surgery Internship, Orofacial Pain & Dysfunction, Orthodontics, Pediatric Dentistry (Westwood & Venice) and Periodontics.

There are three types of advanced education programs offered, in addition to the residency programs:

===== Advanced clinical training programs =====
Advanced clinical training programs (ACT) are meant for graduates of foreign and U.S. dental schools. There are nine different programs offered: Endodontics, Orofacial Pain & Dysfunction, Orthodontics, Orthodontics Advanced, Pediatric Dentistry, Restorative Dentistry, Surgical Implant and Advanced Surgical Implant. Programs generally require a year to a three-year commitment. The programs culminate with the trainees receiving a certificate of completion. The ACT programs are not accredited by the Commission on Dental Accreditation.

===== Preceptorship programs =====
Preceptorship programs are meant for U.S. or internationally-trained dentists who want specialized postgraduate training. These programs are between one and four academic quarters long and enrollees have more of an observer experience. There are 15 different programs offered: Advanced Implantology, Advanced Prosthodontics, AEGD Westwood, Endodontics, Hospital Dentistry, Oral & Maxillofacial Surgery, Oral Biology, Orofacial Pain & Dysfunction, Orthodontics, Orthodontics Advanced, Pediatric Dentistry, Periodontics, Restorative Dentistry and Surgical Implant Dentistry. The Preceptorship programs are not accredited by the Commission on Dental Accreditation.

===== Geriatric Dentistry Fellowship =====
The Geriatric Dentistry Fellowship is a two-year training program to prepare dentists with the specific skills needed to treat geriatric patients. The program runs for two years and there is only one slot available per cycle. Applicants must have a degree from a dental school accredited by the local government jurisdiction, a minimum of two years of experience after graduation, or one year experience and one year of postdoctoral training. The maximum is 10 years after graduation.

=== Graduate programs ===
There are two types of graduate programs available at the School of Dentistry: a Masters of Science in Oral Biology and a PhD in Oral Biology. Both are offered through the school's Division of Oral Biology and Medicine. To be considered for either program, applicants are encouraged to hold a degree in the biological and chemical sciences, and must have a minimum 3.0 grade point average in upper division courses in the bio and chemical sciences.

==== MS Degree in Oral Biology ====
The MS degree program is open to foreign or U.S. holders of DDS degrees who would like more research experience. The MS degree is a two-year program and the number of students accepted to the program ranges from 12 to 15 candidates. The program is formatted by a course component and ends with a thesis. To complete the program, candidates must fulfill 36 units, 29 of which must be Oral Biology program core courses. Candidates must also take a minimum of six units of elective courses that fit a student's research area and must be at a graduate level.

==== PhD Degree in Oral Biology ====
The PhD degree program is for applicants who are interested in becoming leaders in academic dentistry. Oral Biology also offers a duel DDS and PhD degree program. The PhD program ranges in time between four and six years and accepts two to five individuals. The program requires students to complete the core courses in the Oral Biology Program, as well as courses designed to build a research foundation. Candidates will experience laboratory rotations and take academic courses in that first year. A research mentor will be chosen at the end of the first year, and these mentors will advise them throughout the next three to four years and while they work on their thesis dissertation. A written and oral exam are issued at the end of their second year, called the Qualifying Presentation. Before candidates can graduate, a dissertation defense is required and a midterm exam occurs between these two presentations.

=== Continuing dental education ===
In addition to the DDS, advanced training and MS and PhD degrees, the school offers continuing dental education courses. Participants are school alumni, local dentists and other dental-related professionals. The CE program is housed at the School of Dentistry academic buildings and the majority of courses are held here. Some courses are held in other parts of the country, such as the annual Hawaii Symposium. Courses offered range from implants and anesthesiology to oral surgery and pediatric dentistry. Most of the instructors are full-time faculty members from the school, but there are also instructors who are working professionals in the field.

== Patient care and dental clinics ==
The School of Dentistry operates two large, fully functioning dental clinics: the UCLA Dental Clinics in Westwood, which consists of a general clinic and over 15 specialized clinics; and the Wilson-Jennings-Bloomfield UCLA Venice Dental Center, which is located in Venice Beach and treats under-served communities in the area. Dental students and residents, along with a supervising faculty member, are prepared to address the oral health needs of any patient. Although patient care is obviously the clinic's primary concern, the school is also responsible for the education and training of dental students and residents. Since the School of Dentistry is an educational institution, several of the procedures and policies differ from a private practice.

=== Levels of care ===
Patients can choose from three levels of care, based on their treatment needs and the cost.

==== General clinic ====
The School of Dentistry operates a general clinic where the pre-doctoral students treat patients, with a faculty member overseeing the treatment plan. Once a patient has been screened and accepted as a patient, they will be assigned to a team of students, a fourth-year, a third-year, and a second-year student. One of the benefits of becoming a patient in the general clinic is the significantly lower cost of treatment when compared to fees in the private sector. However, there may be more appointments that take place to complete the work needed when compared to the private sector.

==== Residency clinics ====
Residency clinics offer advanced and specialized services administered by residents - dentists who have successfully received a dental degree (DDS, DMD or equivalent) and are now in a postgraduate training program. The cost of treatment at the residency clinics is higher than the general clinic, and will vary from clinic-to-clinic, depending on the complexity of a patient's case. However, the fees are still lower than the private sector.

==== Faculty Group Dental Practice ====
The Faculty Group Dental Practice is where School of Dentistry's full-time faculty members perform dental care on private patients, and fees are comparable to those in the private sector. Services offered are general dentistry and dental hygiene. The specialized services offered are endodontics, oral and maxillofacial surgery, orthodontics, pediatric dentistry, periodontics, and prosthodontics.

=== Specialized services ===
- Advanced Prosthodontics deals with the comprehensive dental care for complex, multidisciplinary cases requiring fixed, removable and implant dental treatment.
- Oral and Maxillofacial Surgery deals with extractions of teeth and surgical procedures for patients who need ambulatory procedures.
- Hospital Dentistry deals with advanced dental treatment for patients with severe medical, physical, or mental impairments. Provides dental services under IV sedation and in operating room settings.
- Esthetic Dentistry is focused on the appearance of the teeth and gums. These specialists also perform limited periodontics and orthodontic treatment as concerned with esthetics.
- Orofacial Pain deals with the treatment for such conditions as tight muscle jaw and obstructive sleep apnea (for patients who can't tolerate a CPAP device).
- Orthodontics deals with treatment for jaw, bite, and tooth alignment.
- Oral Pathology deals with tissue specimens and biopsies for diagnosis of disease.
- Pediatric Dentistry provides oral health care to infants, children, adolescents, and individuals with special health care needs.
- Periodontics and Implant Surgery deals with non-surgical and surgical therapy for diseases of the gums, hard tissues and soft tissues around the teeth.

== Research ==
The School of Dentistry has a robust research program. In the 2013-14 fiscal year, there were 25 new contracts and grants awarded, totaling nearly $20 million, awarded to faculty from the National Institutes of Health and other funding agencies.

There are six research Centers of Excellence, which center around a particular area of research:

- Bioengineering
- Bone Biology
- Cancer Biology
- Health Services
- Molecular Microbiology
- Salivary Diagnostics

The School of Dentistry has established three research centers, which each have a central research theme:

- Center for Oral/Head and Neck Oncology Research has ongoing research projects that cover salivary diagnostics, nanomedicine solutions, and oral cancer therapies.
- Clinical Research Center coordinates and conducts clinical investigational study. There are roughly two to three large-scale clinical projects going on.
- Weintraub Center for Reconstructive Biotechnology works to improve the quality of life for patients who have experienced loss of oral or facial structures due to cancer, trauma or birth defects.

== Public service activities ==
The School of Dentistry engages in public service activities, including participation at health fairs at locations all across the Southern California region and encouraging students from under represented communities to become interested in the dental profession and the health sciences.

=== Health fairs ===
Starting in 1998, the school has participated in health fairs across the entire Southern California region. Participation includes providing free dental care and oral hygiene instruction.

== See also ==
- American Student Dental Association
- List of dental schools in the United States
