= Medical University of South Carolina College of Dental Medicine =

Dental school in Charleston, South Carolina

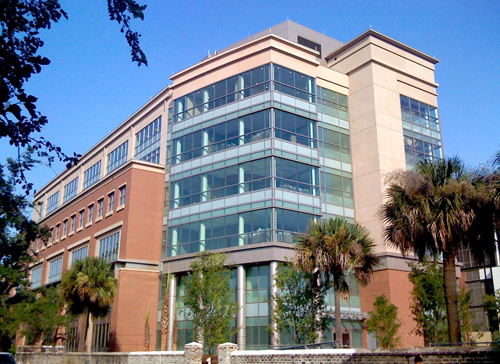
- James B. Edwards Dental Clinics Building
- Type: Public university
- Established: 1953
- Dean: Dr. Patricia L. Blanton
- Location: Charleston, SC, U.S. 32.7865°N 79.9485°W
- Website: musc.edu/dentistry

The College of Dental Medicine is the dental school of the Medical University of South Carolina. It is located in the city of Charleston, South Carolina, United States. It is the only dental school in South Carolina.

== History ==
Medical University of South Carolina College of Dental Medicine is a part of Medical University of South Carolina. The school was established in 1953, and the first graduating class from the College of Dental Medicine received DMD degrees in June 1971. In 2010, the college was officially renamed the James B. Edwards College of Dental Medicine.

Completed in Fall 2009, the James B. Edwards Dental Clinics Building is one of newest and most advanced dental clinic facilities in the nation. Its bold lines and innovative architecture have helped make this building a leading example for many dental schools currently building new clinical facilities. With over 120,000 square feet, all departments and clinics have enough room to grow as needed while continuing to deliver the highest level of dental care.

The Basic Science Building and Dental Clinics Building sit on land that once housed the Charleston Arsenal during the Civil War. The land was later donated to form the Porter Gaud School, which moved to a new campus, thus allowing for the creation of the Medical University of South Carolina at its current location in downtown peninsular Charleston, SC.

== Admissions ==
Admission to the College of Dental Medicine at MUSC is very competitive. There are roughly 900 applications for a class of 70 seats. Roughly 15 of the seats are reserved for out-of-state students, while the remaining 55 seats are reserved for South Carolina residents. For the Class of 2016, the average cumulative undergraduate GPA was a 3.65. The average DAT academic average (AA) was a 19, and a perceptual ability (PAT) score of 20.

MUSC is the most expensive public dental school in the United States for in-state residents. For non-South Carolinians, MUSC is the third most expensive dental school, public or private, in the United States.

== Academics ==
The MUSC College of Dental Medicine is one of the premier clinical schools in the country, with classes reported to score well above the national average on the NBDE Parts I and II, leading to very high match rates for dental specialty residency programs. MUSC has a very strong clinical reputation, with recent NBDE Part II scores ranking as high as 5th best among all dental schools in the country. As of January 2012, both parts of the NBDE will be rated on a pass/fail basis, eliminating the numerical score.

Medical University of South Carolina College of Dental Medicine awards following degrees:

- Doctor of Dental Medicine

== Departments ==
Medical University of South Carolina College of Dental Medicine includes the following departments:

- Department of Craniofacial Biology
- Department of Oral and Maxillofacial Surgery
- Department of Oral Rehabilitation
- Department of Pediatric Dentistry and Orthodontics
- Department of Stomatology

== Accreditation ==
Medical University of South Carolina College of Dental Medicine is currently accredited by ADA.

== Other ==
The Colbert Library at MUSC is named after the father of Stephen Colbert, a Charleston native, and host of the Colbert Report.

== See also ==
- American Student Dental Association
