= Dental Admission Test =

Standardized exam for prospective dental students

- Acronym: DAT
- Type: Computer-based standardized test
- Administrator: American Dental Association
- Skills tested: Biology, General Chemistry, Organic Chemistry, Perceptual Ability, Reading Comprehension, and Quantitative Reasoning
- Purpose: Admissions to dental colleges (mostly in the United States and Canada).
- Year started: 1950
- Score range: 200-600 (in 10-point increments) for each of the 8 sections (Biology, General Chemistry, Organic Chemistry, Perceptual Ability, Reading Comprehension, and Quantitative Reasoning, Total Science, and Academic Average ).
- Score validity: Usually 2 to 3 years (depends on dental college being applied to).
- Offered: Year-round.
- Restrictions on attempts: Can be taken maximum 3 times. Additional retesting requires authorization by the ADA.
- Regions: United States, Canada, Guam, Virgin Islands, and Puerto Rico.
- Languages: English
- Prerequisites: Candidate must be preparing to apply to a dental school. Fluency in English assumed.
- Fee: US$ 560 ("Fee Assistance Program" available to U.S. citizens, permanent residents or refugees, demonstrating financial need.)
- Used by: Dental colleges (mostly in the United States and Canada).
- Website: www.ada.org/en/education-careers/dental-admission-test/

The Dental Admission Test (abbreviated DAT) is a multiple-choice standardized exam taken by potential dental school students in the United States and Canada (although there is a separate Canadian version with differing sections, both American and Canadian versions are usually interchangeably accepted in both countries' dental schools. This article will specifically describe the American DAT). The DAT is a computer based test that can be administered almost any day of the year. Tests are taken at Prometric testing centers throughout the United States after the preliminary application through the American Dental Association is completed. Each applicant may only take the test a total of three times before having to ask special permission to take the exam again. After taking the exam, applicants must wait 90 days before repeating it. Each exam costs $560, all of which is non-refundable.

== Test sections ==
The DAT comprises four sections: survey of the natural sciences (90 minutes), perceptual ability (often called the PAT, 60 minutes), reading comprehension (60 minutes), and quantitative reasoning (45 minutes). The mathematics of the quantitative exam is similar to that of the SAT. The first section is divided into questions about biology (40 questions), general chemistry (30 questions), and organic chemistry (30 questions). The second section is divided into six different problem sets designed to test perceptual ability, specifically in the areas of three-dimensional manipulation and spatial reasoning. The third section of the DAT is divided into three academic essays, each of which is followed by questions about the passage's content. The final section tests basic mathematics skills, with emphasis placed on algebra, critical thinking, fractions, roots, and trigonometric identities.

Test breakdown

Section	Questions	Time Limit
Optional Tutorial		15 Minutes
Survey of Natural Sciences	100	90 Minutes
-Biology	40	
-General Chemistry	30	
-Organic Chemistry	30	
Perceptual Ability Test	90	60 Minutes
-Keyhole	15	
-Top/Front/End Visualization	15	
-Angle Ranking	15	
-Hole Punches	15	
-Cube Counting	15	
-Pattern Folding	15	
Optional Break		30 Minutes
Reading Comprehension Test	50	60 Minutes
Quantitative Reasoning Test	40	45 Minutes
-Mathematics	30	
-Applied Mathematics (Word Problems)	10	
Optional Post-Test Survey		15 Minutes
Total	280	5:00 Hours

== Changes to the test ==
The test specifications for the Biology section changed in 2014. These changes reflected a shift on the way that Biology is taught in survey courses. This means that the questions now focus on "complex interactions within biological systems, rather than viewing biology in a reductionist manner". There are also changes to the Quantitative Reasoning section. It has been "revised to eliminate the sections for numerical calculations, conversions, geometry, and trigonometry. Items have been added in the following areas: data analysis, interpretation, and sufficiency; quantitative comparison; and probability and statistics." During 2014 and 2015, examinees may have seen some questions that reflect such changes, however, they were not scored. Actual changes to the sections did not take place sooner than 2015.

== Scores ==
After completion of the test, eight standard scores on a scale of 1–30 (200–600 as of March 2025) are calculated and released to the test taker 2-4 weeks after completion. The first six scores come directly from the test: perceptual ability, reading comprehension, quantitative reasoning, biology, general chemistry, and organic chemistry. The remaining two scores reported are summaries of the previous six: the Academic Average is the average of five scores rounded to the nearest whole number: quantitative reasoning, reading comprehension, biology, general chemistry, and organic chemistry. The Total Science score is a standard score based on all 100 questions in the biology, general chemistry, and organic chemistry tests. Dental schools frequently summarize their applicant's scores by listing the academic, science, and perceptual ability (PAT) scores they typically see in their matriculating classes.

The mean (average) score for any scored section is set at 17, with the exception of the reading comprehension section, in which the 50th percentile score is a 19. Scores above and below this represent fractions of standard deviations from the mean. This probabilistic scoring system results in the maximum not occurring for the compiled section scores (natural sciences and academic average) in a given year. For example, in 2003 a 25 academic average was labeled as 100.0th percentile, such that less than eight people received this score, and none higher (approximately 13,000 people take the DAT per year).

The mean academic average score for admissions is commonly 19. There are varying perspectives on the relative importance of sections, wherein the PAT or reading comprehension can be viewed as the most important or conversely, ignored. The PAT in particular is most often viewed as a threshold score, and therefore is the only score not included in the academic average; the threshold varies between 16 and 18.

== Reporting scores ==
As of the 2011 dental application cycle, applicants no longer self-report their American DAT scores on their applications. Using the applicant's DENTPIN, the application service ADEA AADSAS will officially download all scores to the applicant's dental application. All test scores will be downloaded if the test is taken multiple times. During registration for the DAT, the applicant can indicate potential dental schools to send the scores to. As long as the applicant indicates at least one ADEA AADSAS-participating dental school in the DAT registration, the official DAT scores will be imported into the dental school application that is sent to every school designated in the ADEA AADSAS application. The only exception is if the school an applicant is applying to does not participate in the ADEA AADSAS application process.

== See also ==
- American Student Dental Association
- American Dental Association
- Dentistry
- List of dental schools in the United States
- Optometry Admission Test
