= Stony Brook University School of Dental Medicine =

Educational institution

Coordinates: 40.903261°N 73.120300°W

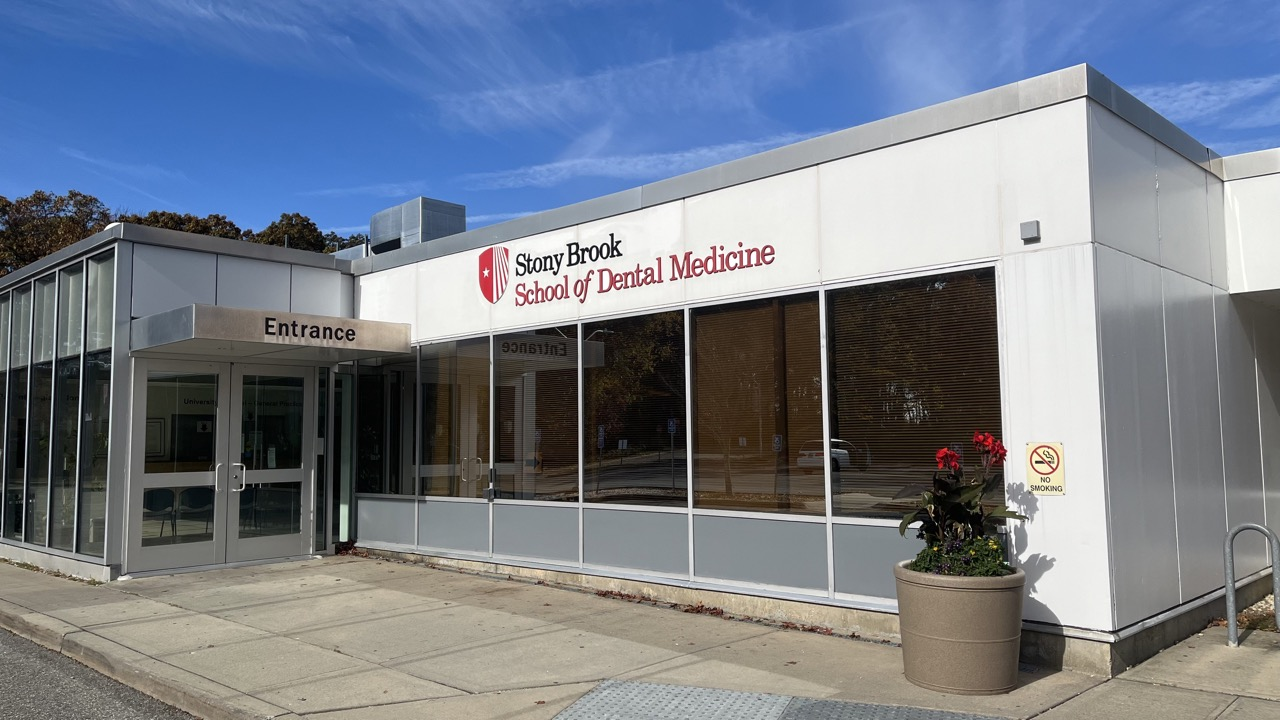
- Type: Public university
- Established: 1968
- Dean: Dr. Patrick Lloyd
- Location: Stony Brook, NY, U.S.
- Website: Stony Brook School of Dental Medicine

Stony Brook University School of Dental Medicine is a school of dentistry located in Stony Brook, New York on Long Island. It is one of 12 colleges within Stony Brook University and was founded in 1968.

The school is one of the five dental schools in the state of New York and is one of only two public dental schools in the state of New York along with the State University of New York at Buffalo School of Dental Medicine.

== History ==
The Stony Brook University School of Dental Medicine was founded at Stony Brook University in 1968. The founding dean was Dr. J. Howard Oaks, who previously served as acting dean of the Harvard School of Dental Medicine. Its first class of students was welcomed in September 1973, and graduated in January 1977.

== Academics ==
Stony Brook University School of Dental Medicine awards the following degrees:

- Doctor of Dental Surgery
- Master of Science in Oral Biology and Pathology

== Departments ==
Stony Brook University School of Dental Medicine includes the following departments:

- Department of General Dentistry
- Department of Oral and Maxillofacial Surgery
- Department of Oral Biology and Pathology
- Department of Orthodontics and Pediatric Dentistry
- Department of Periodontics and Endodontics
- Department of Prosthodontics and Digital Technology

== Advanced Education Programs ==
The school has eight postdoctoral programs that are certified by the American Dental Association's Commission on Dental Accreditation:

- Dental Anesthesiology
- Endodontics
- General, Practice
- Oral and Maxillofacial Radiology
- Orthodontics and Dentofacial Orthopedics
- Pediatric Dentistry
- Periodontics
- Prosthodontics

== Accreditation ==
Stony Brook University School of Dental Medicine is currently accredited by American Dental Association.

== Notable alumni ==
- Maria Emanuel Ryan, DDS '89, PhD '98, vice president and chief clinical officer, Colgate-Palmolive
- Jane Weintraub, DDS '79, past dean and Rozier Distinguished Professor of Dental Public Health, UNC Adams School of Dentistry
- Mark Wolff, DDS '81, PD GPR '82, PhD '97, Morton Amsterdam Dean, University of Pennsylvania School of Dental Medicine

== See also ==
- American Student Dental Association
