= UNC Adams School of Dentistry =

Dental school in Chapel Hill, North Carolina

Coordinates: 35.90479°N 79.05336°W

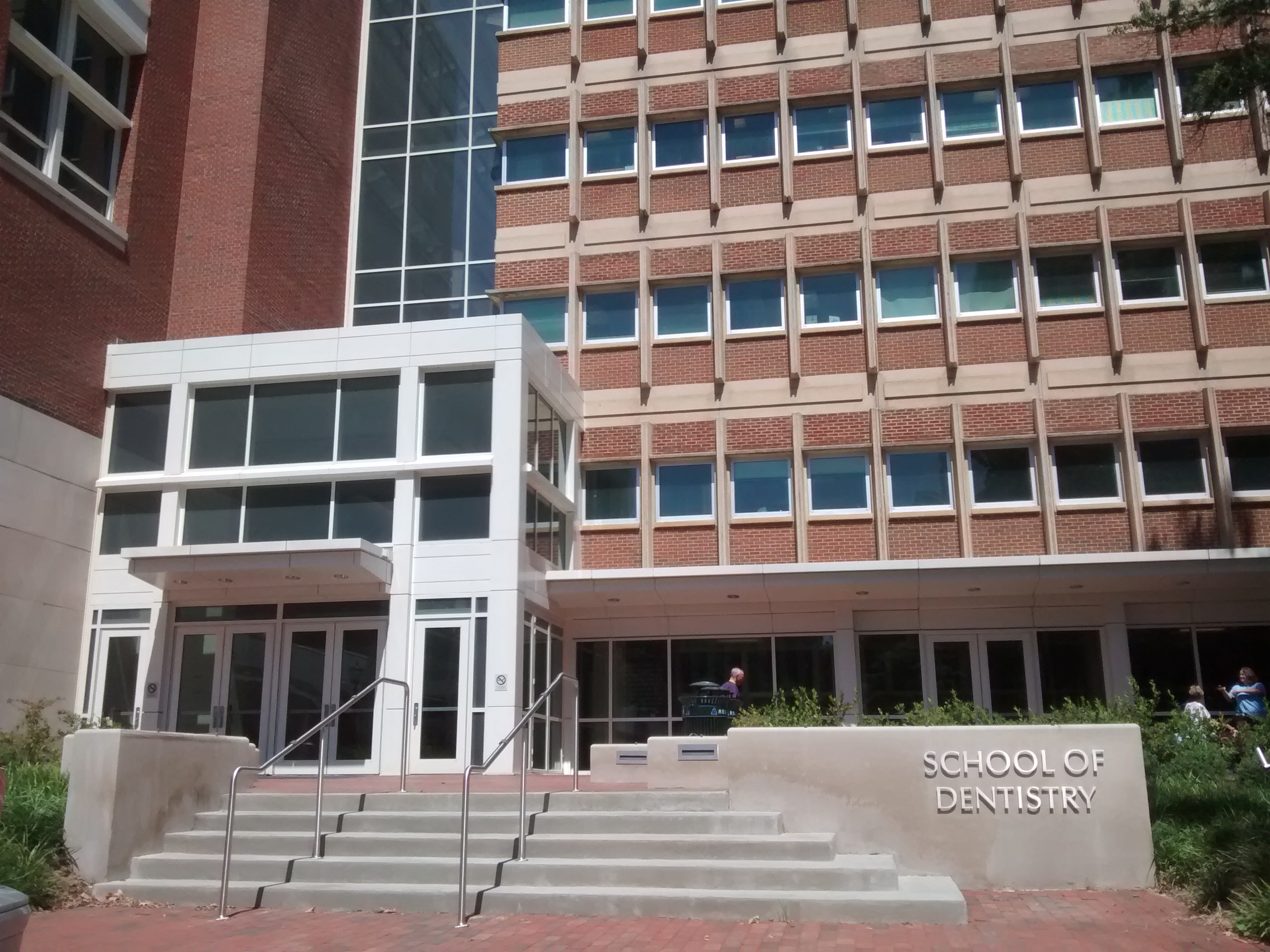
- Former name: UNC School of Dentistry (1950–2019)
- Type: Public university
- Established: 1950
- Affiliations: University of North Carolina at Chapel Hill
- Dean: Janet M. Guthmiller
- Location: Chapel Hill, North Carolina, U.S.
- Website: dentistry.unc.edu

The UNC Adams School of Dentistry (formally UNC Claude A. Adams Jr. and Grace Phillips Adams School of Dentistry) is the school of dentistry of the University of North Carolina at Chapel Hill, a public university in Chapel Hill, North Carolina, United States.

Founded in 1950 as the UNC School of Dentistry, it was the only dental school in North Carolina until 2011, when East Carolina University School of Dental Medicine became the second. High Point University's Workman School of Dental Medicine became the third in 2024.

In 2019, the school received its largest single donation of $27.68 million, resulting in a name change to honor Dr. Claude A. Adams Jr. and Grace Phillips Adams. Dr. Adams was a North Carolina dentist that practiced in Durham until his death in 2018.

== History ==
Established in 1950, the UNC School of Dentistry was the first dental school in North Carolina, and was the state's only dental school for 61 years. The North Carolina General Assembly of 1949 made creation of the Adams School of Dentistry possible. The first class of 40 students was admitted in fall 1950, although the dental building was not occupied until September 1952, and classes were held in two Quonset huts.

Since that time, the school has grown to include four buildings (not including two that were demolished): First Dental; Brauer Hall; Tarrson Hall, which includes clinical teaching facilities; and Koury Oral Health Sciences, which houses the majority of the school's research laboratories, classrooms, a lecture hall that seats 220, and a 105-person simulation lab. With the $120 million expansion and addition of the Koury Oral Health Sciences building in 2012, the Adams School of Dentistry is now nearly 500,000 square feet, making it the largest dental complex in the United States.

On campus, the dental buildings are located near the schools of medicine, nursing, pharmacy, and public health, contributing to the spirit of collaboration among the health sciences at Carolina.

== Academics ==
The UNC Adams School of Dentistry engages in oral and craniofacial health care education, research, patient care and service. The School awards following degrees:

- Master of Science in Endodontics
- Master of Science in Dental Hygiene Education
- Master of Science in Operative Dentistry
- Master of Science in Oral & Maxillofacial Pathology
- Master of Science in Oral & Maxillofacial Radiology
- Master of Science in Orthodontics
- Master of Science in Pediatric Dentistry
- Master of Science in Operative Dentistry
- Master of Science in Periodontology
- Master of Science in Prosthodontics
- Doctor of Dental Surgery
- Doctor of Philosophy in Oral Biology

Among the student organizations at the school include; Academy of General Dentistry, American Dental Education Association, American Association for Women Dentists, American Student Dental Association, Barakat Student Ambassadors, Delta Sigma Delta - Dental Fraternity, ENNEAD: UNC Chapter of the American Association of Public Health Dentistry, Hispanic Dental Association, LGBDent, Military Student Dental Association, Oral Maxillofacial Interest Group, Sports Dentistry Club, Spurgeon Student Government, Student Entrepreneurs in Dentistry, and the Student National Dental Association. UNC also has a student-run clinic for members of the surrounding community in need of emergent dental services.

The most recent D.D.S. class has 75% North Carolina residents, and 25% out of state students. The average undergraduate GPA of the entering D.D.S. class at the Adams School of Dentistry is 3.6, with an average DAT score of 22. For the out of state students, the average GPA and DAT were augmented at 3.7 and 24 AA respectively, giving UNC one of the most competitive admissions rates nationwide.

== Research and Innovation ==
The UNC-CH Adams School of Dentistry consistently ranks among the nation's top 10 dental schools in NIH funding, and its programs in orofacial pain, oral-systemic relationships, health policy and education, fundamental mechanisms of disease, clinical therapeutics, and other areas of oral and craniofacial health science make it a center of basic, translational, and clinical research. The overarching emphasis is on the promotion of oral health and function. Research also is conducted in the areas of health services, health policy and health education. New knowledge is shared through presentations at scientific forums and publication in the scholarly literature. The Adams School of Dentistry scientists interact and collaborate with investigators on the UNC-Chapel Hill campus, as well as with leading scientists and institutions elsewhere in the United States and abroad.

Outreach allows dental students and faculty to travel on international project trips, school-to-school exchanges and faculty engagements. There are international projects in Malawi and Singapore.

== Accreditation ==
As of March 2023, the Adams School of Dentistry was granted the "approval without reporting requirements" status by the Commission on Dental Accreditation.
