= University of Colorado School of Dental Medicine =

Dental school in Aurora, Colorado, US

University of Colorado Anschutz School of Dental Medicine
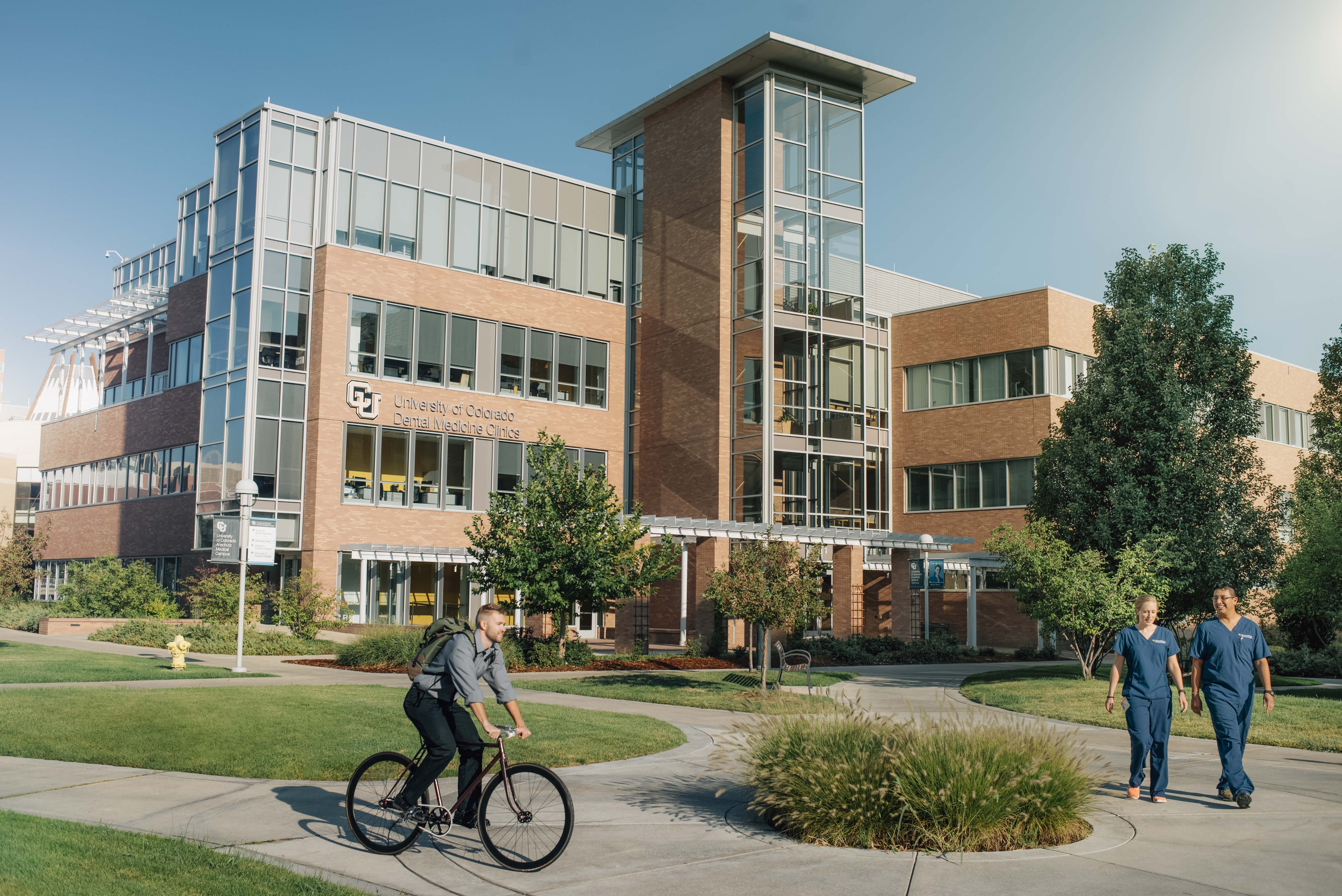
- Type: Public university
- Established: 1973
- Dean: Dr. Denise K. Kassebaum
- Location: Aurora, CO, U.S. 39°44′39″N 104°50′10″W
- Website: https://dental.cuanschutz.edu/

The University of Colorado Anschutz School of Dental Medicine is the dental school of the University of Colorado. It is located on the CU Anschutz campus in the city of Aurora, Colorado, United States. It is the only dental school in Colorado.

== History ==
The School of Dental Medicine is part of the University of Colorado. This school was established in 1973 by an amendment to the state constitution and is the only dental school in Colorado. Previously, the Denver School of Dentistry was established in the state, operating as a unit of the University of Denver between 1888 and 1932.

== Academics ==
University of Colorado Anschutz School of Dental Medicine awards the following degrees:

- Doctor of Dental Surgery
- General Practice Residency
- Graduate program - Orthodontics
- Graduate program - Periodontics

== Clinics ==
University of Colorado Anschutz School of Dental Medicine has eight dental clinics:

- Adolescent Clinic
- Dental Faculty Practice Clinic
- Dental First Aid Clinic
- Dental Team Care Clinic
- General Practice Residency Clinic
- Graduate Periodontics Clinic
- Orthodontic Clinic
- Senior and Special Care Clinic

== Departments ==
University of Colorado Anschutz School of Dental Medicine includes the following clinical departments:

- Community Dentistry and Population Health
- Craniofacial, Oral and Materials Sciences
- Diagnostic Sciences and Surgical Dentistry
- Orthodontics
- Pediatric Dentistry
- Restorative Dentistry

== Accreditation ==
University of Colorado Anschutz School of Dental Medicine is currently accredited by the ADA.

== See also ==
- American Student Dental Association
