= University of Kentucky College of Dentistry =

Dental school in Lexington, Kentucky, US

- Type: Public
- Established: 1962
- Dean: Dr. Jeffrey Okeson
- Location: Lexington, KY, U.S. 38.0315°N 84.5063°W
- Website: dentistry.uky.edu/

The University of Kentucky College of Dentistry (UKCD) is the dental school of the University of Kentucky. It is located in the city of Lexington, Kentucky, United States. It is one of two dental schools in Kentucky.

== History ==
The University of Kentucky College of Dentistry was established in 1962.

== Academic Offerings ==
In addition to the Doctor of Dental Medicine degree, the University of Kentucky College of Dentistry offers postdoctoral programs in six fields of study:

- General Practice Dentistry
- Oral and Maxillofacial Surgery
- Orofacial Pain
- Orthodontics
- Pediatric Dentistry
- Periodontics

All seven programs hold current and full accreditation by the Commission on Dental Accreditation (CODA).

== Departments and Divisions ==
Two departments and twelve divisions make up the college:

- Department of Oral Health Practice
  - Division of Endodontics
  - Division of Oral Diagnosis, Oral Medicine and Oral and Maxillofacial Radiology
  - Division of Periodontology
  - Division of Restorative Dentistry
  - Division of Prosthodontics
- Department of Oral Health Science
  - Division of Oral and Maxillofacial Surgery
  - Division of Pediatric Dentistry
  - Division of Adult Dentistry
  - Division of Oral Pathology
  - Division of Orofacial Pain
  - Division of Orthodontics
  - Division of Public Health Dentistry
