= Nova Southeastern University College of Dental Medicine =

Privat school in Fort Lauderdale, Florida

Coordinates: 26°4′44″N 80°14′37″W

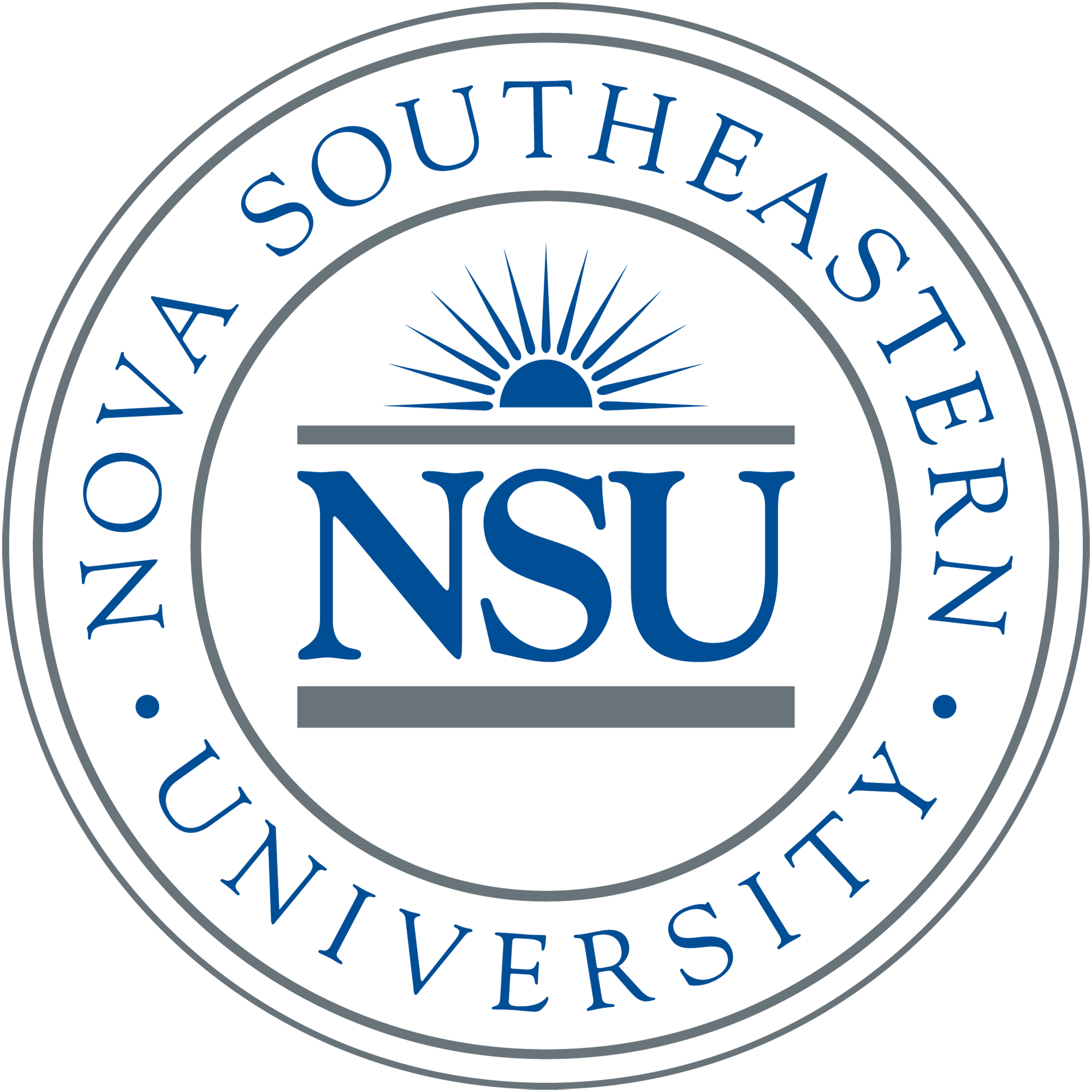
- Type: Private university
- Established: 1997
- Dean: Dr. Steven I. Kaltman (interim)
- Location: Fort Lauderdale, FL, U.S.
- Website: dental.nova.edu

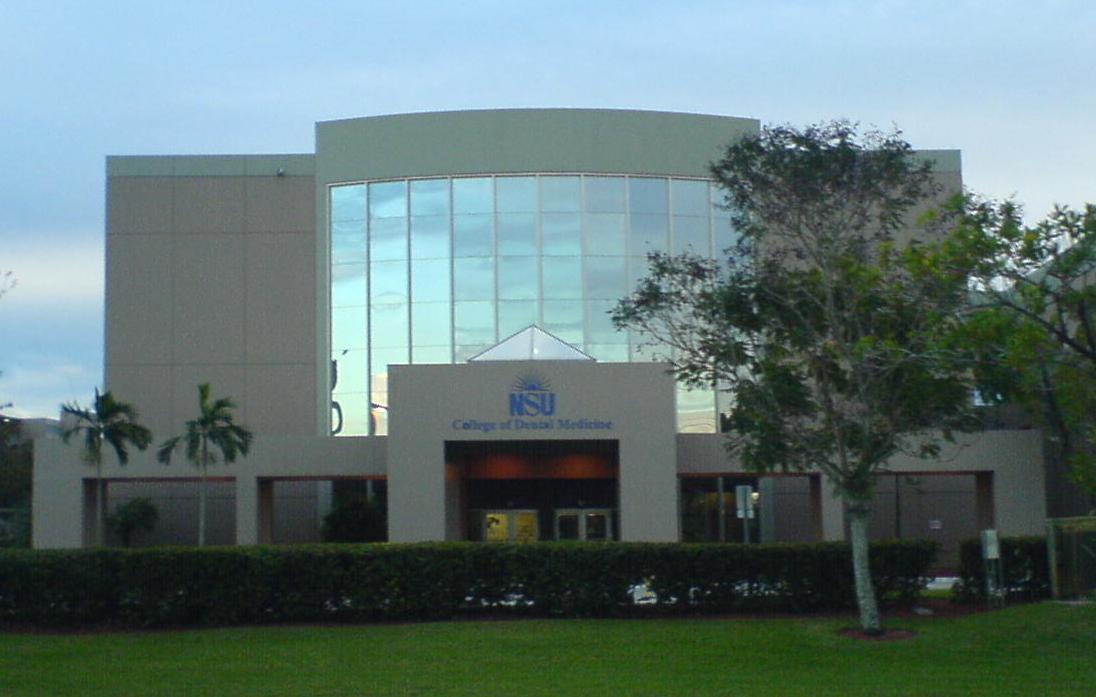
Exterior

The Nova Southeastern University College of Dental Medicine is the dental school of Nova Southeastern University. It is located in Fort Lauderdale, Florida, United States. When it opened in 1997, it was the first new dental school to open in the United States in 24 years. It is the largest dental school in Florida. The school is accredited by the American Dental Association.

== Academics ==
In recent years, it has received more applications for admittance than any other dental school in the United States. There are approximately 3,500 applicants for the entering class size of 110. Entering first year students averaged in the 95th percentile nationally on the Dental Admission Test. It offers a four-year D.M.D. program, along with postdoctoral programs in Advanced Education in General Dentistry (AEGD), Endodontics, Orthodontics, Pedodontics (Pediatric Dentistry), Periodontology, Prosthodontics, Oral and Maxillofacial Surgery (four-year program), and Master of Science in Craniofacial Research.

== Research ==
The NSU College of Dental Medicine is currently involved in biomaterials development and research in oral biology.

The Southeastern College of Dental Medicine claims to have the largest and most compete histological archive in the world, containing over 200,000 specimens of teeth, which weigh in total more than 3 tons.

== See also ==
- American Student Dental Association
