= Creighton University School of Dentistry =

Dental school in Omaha, Nebraska, US

- Motto: "Willing to Lead"
- Type: Private university
- Established: 1905
- Dean: Jillian Wallen
- Students: 462
- Location: Omaha, Nebraska, U.S.
- Campus: Urban
- Website: www.creighton.edu/dentistry/

The Creighton University School of Dentistry is the dental school of Creighton University.

== Accreditation ==
Creighton University School of Dentistry is currently accredited by the American Dental Association (ADA). The school's current building on Cuming Street was completed in 2018, with a size over 200,000 square feet. Each year, Creighton School of Dentistry receives around 3,000 applications for a class size of 117. Over 6,000 dentists have graduated from the school. Over 15,000 patients visit the school each year.

== See also ==
- American Student Dental Association
