= University of Oklahoma College of Dentistry =

Dental school in Oklahoma City, Oklahoma, US

Coordinates: 35°28′51″N 97°29′39″W

University of Oklahoma; College of Dentistry
Established	1971
School type	Public
Dean	Dr. Paul M. Mullasseril
Location	Oklahoma City, Oklahoma, USA
Enrollment	232 undergraduate students
Homepage	http://dentistry.ouhsc.edu/

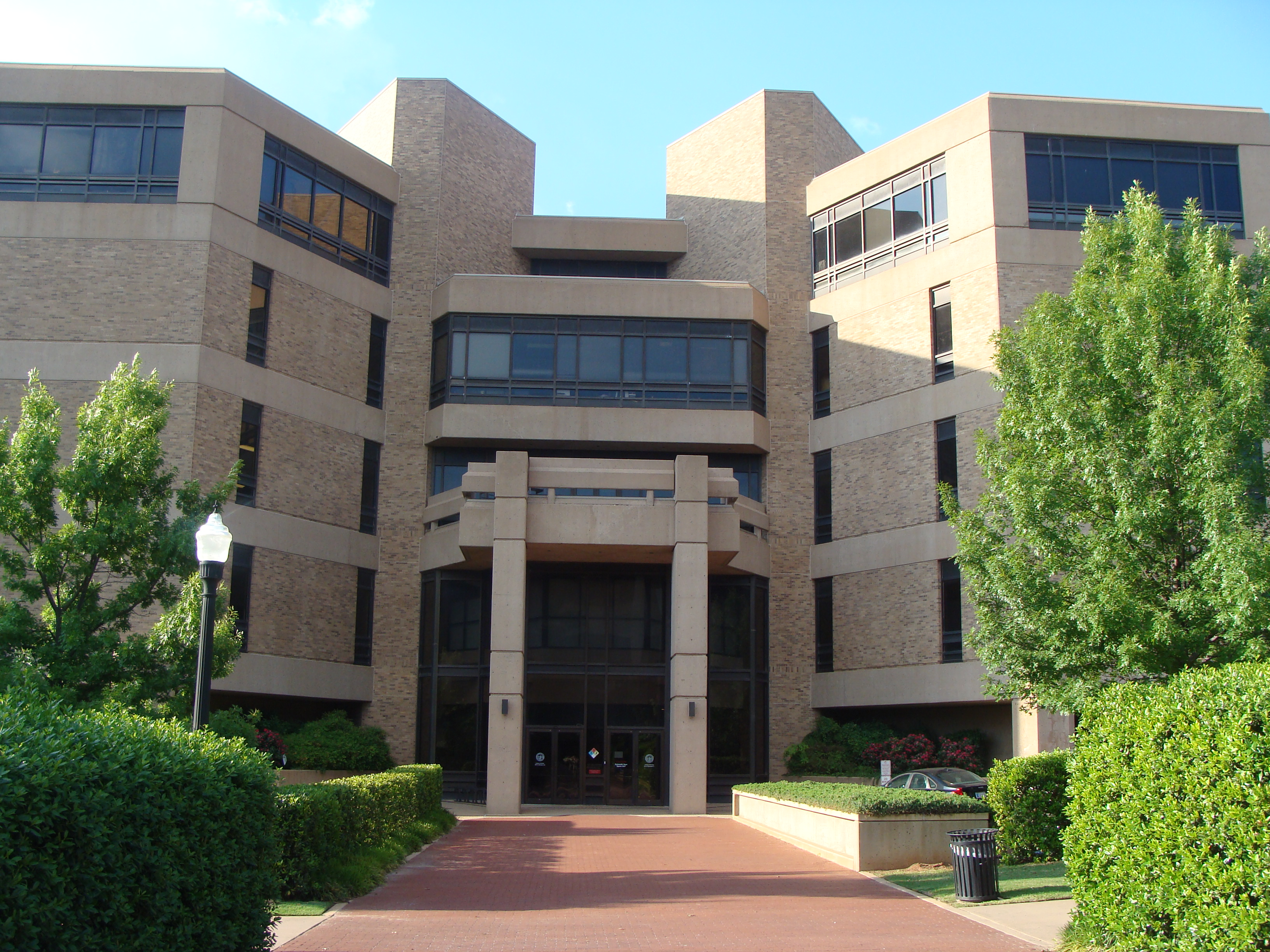

The University of Oklahoma College of Dentistry was established in 1971.

== History ==
The University of Oklahoma Board of Regents authorized establishment of a College of Dentistry in 1954 to respond to the needs of underserved areas of rural Oklahoma. The founding dean, William E. Brown, was recruited in 1969 to initiate planning of the curriculum and facility. The first class of 16 dental hygienists graduated in spring of 1973. Three years later, the first dental class of 24 students graduated in spring 1976. The current dental clinical sciences building was opened in 1976.

== See also ==
- American Student Dental Association
