= University of Washington School of Dentistry =

Dental school in Seattle, Washington, US

Coordinates: 47°38′57″N 122°18′26″W

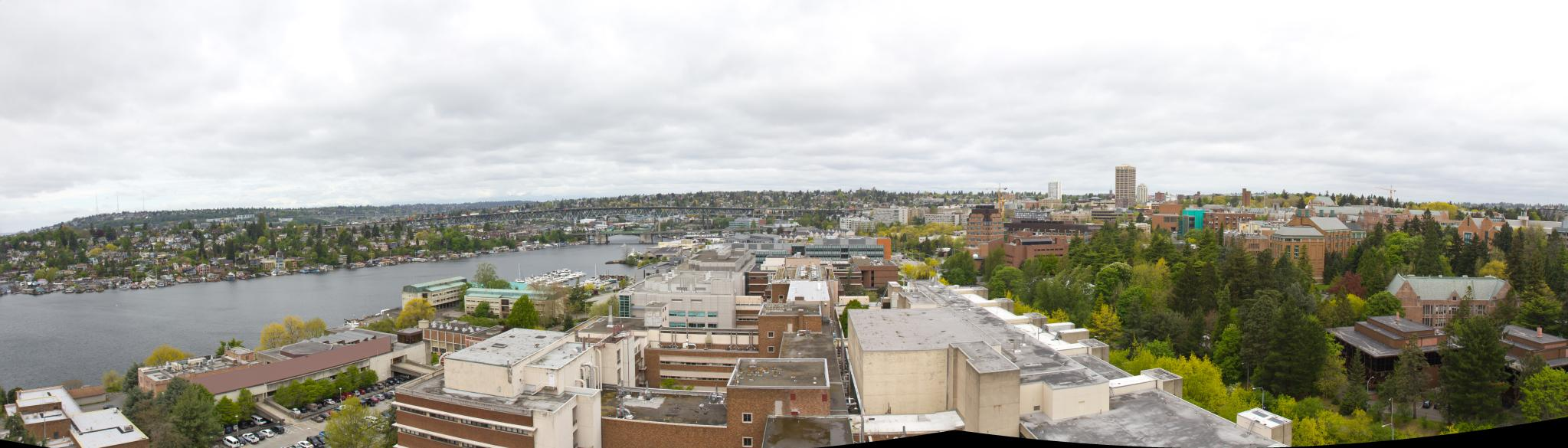
- The School of Dentistry is located in the University of Washington's Health Sciences Center
- Type: Public dental school
- Established: 1945
- Dean: Dr. Andre V. Ritter
- Students: 240
- Location: Seattle, Washington, U.S.
- Website: dental.uw.edu

The University of Washington School of Dentistry is the dental school of the University of Washington in Seattle. It is one of two dental schools in the state of Washington. The school emphasizes research in anxiety, orofacial pain, tissue repair and regeneration, immune response to bacteria, and practice based research.

== Federal grants ==
In 2015, the University of Washington School of Dentistry was ranked 21st out of 48 dental schools receiving federal grants from the National Institute of Dental and Craniofacial Research.

== Departments ==
- Department of Endodontics
- Department of Oral Health Sciences
- Department of Oral Medicine
- Department of Oral and Maxillofacial Surgery
- Department of Orthodontics
- Department of Pediatric Dentistry
- Department of Periodontics
- Department of Restorative Dentistry

== Accreditation ==
The University of Washington School of Dentistry is currently accredited by the ADA.

== Debt problem ==
Despite its reputation as a top standing dental school, the University of Washington School of Dentistry has been in a serious debt crisis between 2010 and 2020. As of 2020, the School of Dentistry has accumulated a debt of $40 million to the university over the course of a decade. Faculty have complained that the mounting debt has been attributed to poor decisions and mismanagement from the administration, as well as the lack of transparency regarding the budget. However, the administration faults the state of Washington's low Medicaid reimbursement. Since the majority of patients at the UW School of Dentistry are on Medicaid, the school must work with the low reimbursement rates. As a result of the worsening debt, Gary Chiodo, previously the interim dean at Oregon Health & Science University's dental school who helped sort out the financial issues there, was hired to straighten out the finances. Since Dean Chiodo was instated as dean of the UW School of Dentistry, the university has taken some steps to address the amassing debt. However, a report from the State Auditor's office has stated that "The university's Board of Regents has given its schools and colleges significant autonomy over their financial decisions. While there is nothing inherently wrong with delegating those decisions, the university's leaders and the board are ultimately responsible for the financial impact of those decisions. To its credit, the university has taken positive steps to help prevent situations similar to what happened at the School of Dentistry from happening again. However, the gaps in financial oversight, the antiquated financial systems and the lack of business training for department chairs identified in this audit show the University of Washington still has plenty of work to do."

== See also ==
- American Student Dental Association
