= Arizona School of Dentistry and Oral Health =

School of dentistry in Mesa, Arizona, US

Coordinates: 33°22′58″N 111°42′15″W

Arizona School of Dentistry and Oral Health at A.T. Still University
- Type: Private, non-profit
- Established: 2003
- Dean: Desmond Gallagher, BBS, MA
- Academic staff: 22 full-time 100+ part-time
- Students: 300
- Location: 5835 East Still Circle, Mesa, AZ 85206, Mesa, AZ, 85206, U.S.
- Campus: 22 acres
- Language: English
- Website: atsu.edu/asdoh

Arizona School of Dentistry and Oral Health (ASDOH) is a graduate school of dentistry located in the city of Mesa, Arizona, United States, and is affiliated with A.T. Still University.

It was the first dental school in Arizona, having opened its doors in 2003 and graduated its first class in 2007. The curriculum places a large focus on public health. The school is accredited by the American Dental Association.

In 2005, the school received a $268,000 Piper Trust Award to purchase equipment, including a CT scan machine, for treating special needs children in the community.

== See also ==
- American Student Dental Association
- A.T. Still University School of Osteopathic Medicine in Arizona
- List of dental schools in the United States
