= Touro College of Dental Medicine =

Dentistry school in Valhalla

- Type: Private university
- Established: 2016
- Accreditation: Commission on Dental Accreditation
- Dean: Ronnie Myers
- Location: Valhalla, New York, U.S. 41.085348°N 73.817459°W
- Website: dental.touro.edu

Touro College of Dental Medicine is a school of dentistry in Valhalla, New York on the New York Medical College campus. The school is a division of the Touro College and University System. The school is the fifth dental school in New York State and is the third private dental school in New York, along with NYU and Columbia.
