= University of Iowa College of Dentistry =

Dental school in Iowa City, Iowa, US

Coordinates: 41.657355°N 91.549805°W

University of Iowa College of Dentistry and Dental Clinics
- Type: Public university
- Established: 1882; 144 years ago
- Dean: Dr. Clark Stanford
- Location: Iowa City, Iowa, U.S.
- Website: dentistry.uiowa.edu

The University of Iowa College of Dentistry is the dental school of the University of Iowa. It is located in Iowa City, Iowa, United States. It is the only dental school in Iowa and is one of only two dental colleges in the United States to offer all the American Dental Association (ADA) accredited dental specialty training programs. It is consistently rated as a top dental school in the country with strong clinical training and research exposure for dental students. Several Iowa alumni serve in leadership positions in academics and in organized dentistry.

== History ==
University of Iowa College of Dentistry was established in 1882. It is the third oldest surviving dental school west of the Mississippi River.

== Academics ==
University of Iowa College of Dentistry awards following degrees:

- Doctor of Dental Surgery (D.D.S)
- Certificate in all ADA accredited residencies
- Master of Science (M.S.) in Oral Science
- Doctor of Philosophy (Ph.D.) in Oral Science

== Departments ==
University of Iowa College of Dentistry includes the following departments:

- Department of Endodontics
- Department of Family Dentistry
- Department of Operative Dentistry
- Department of Oral & Maxillofacial Surgery
- Department of Oral Pathology, Radiology & Medicine
- Department of Orthodontics
- Department of Pediatric Dentistry
- Department of Periodontics
- Department of Preventive & Community Dentistry
- Department of Prosthodontics

== Accreditation ==
University of Iowa College of Dentistry is currently accredited by ADA.

== Notable graduates ==
- Martin Dewey, Class of 1902
- Sheldon Golomb
- Samir Bishara
- Robert Moyers
- Rafiuddin Ahmed - Father of Modern Dentistry in India
