= Louisiana State University School of Dentistry =

Dental school in New Orleans, Louisiana

Coordinates: 29.9912°N 90.0839°W

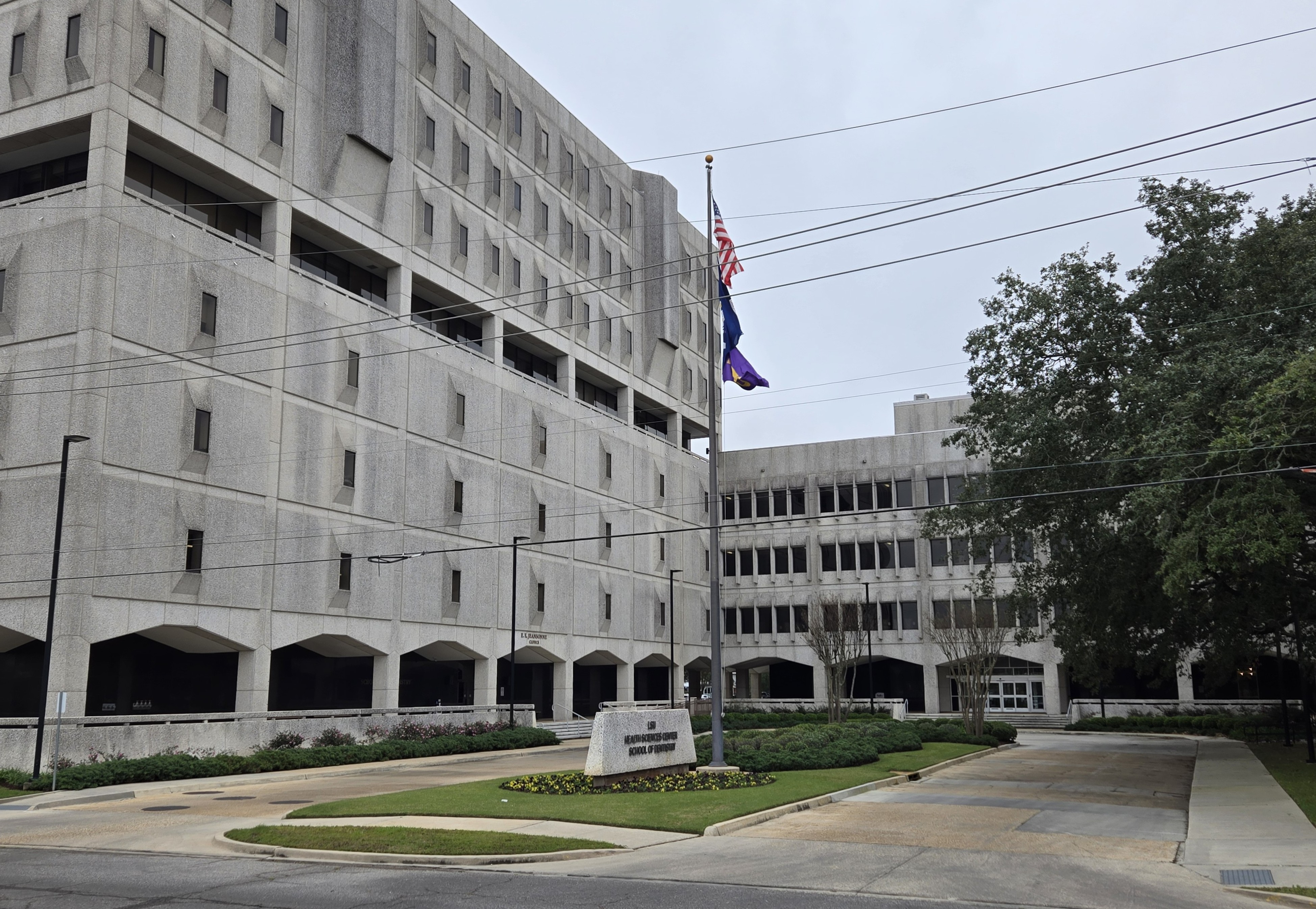
- Type: Public university
- Established: 1968
- Dean: Janet H Southerland, Interim Dean
- Location: New Orleans, LA, U.S.
- Website: lsusd.lsuhsc.edu

Louisiana State University School of Dentistry is a school of dentistry located in the United States city of New Orleans, Louisiana.

== History ==
Louisiana State University School of Dentistry is part of the LSU Health Sciences Center New Orleans. The school was established in 1968.

== Academics ==
Louisiana State University School of Dentistry awards following degrees:

- Doctor of Dental Surgery
- Bachelor of Science in Dental Hygiene
- Associate of Science in Dental Laboratory Technology

== Departments ==
Louisiana State University School of Dentistry includes the following departments:

- Department of Comprehensive Dentistry & Biomaterials
- Department of Endodontics
- Department of Oral & Craniofacial Biology
- Department of Oral & Maxillofacial Pathology
- Department of Oral & Maxillofacial Surgery
- Department of Orthodontics
- Department of Pediatric Dentistry
- Department of Periodontics
- Department of Prosthodontics

== Accreditation ==
Louisiana State University School of Dentistry is currently accredited by ADA.
