= Marquette University School of Dentistry =

Dental school in Milwaukee, Wisconsin, US

Coordinates: 43.038197°N 87.93615°W

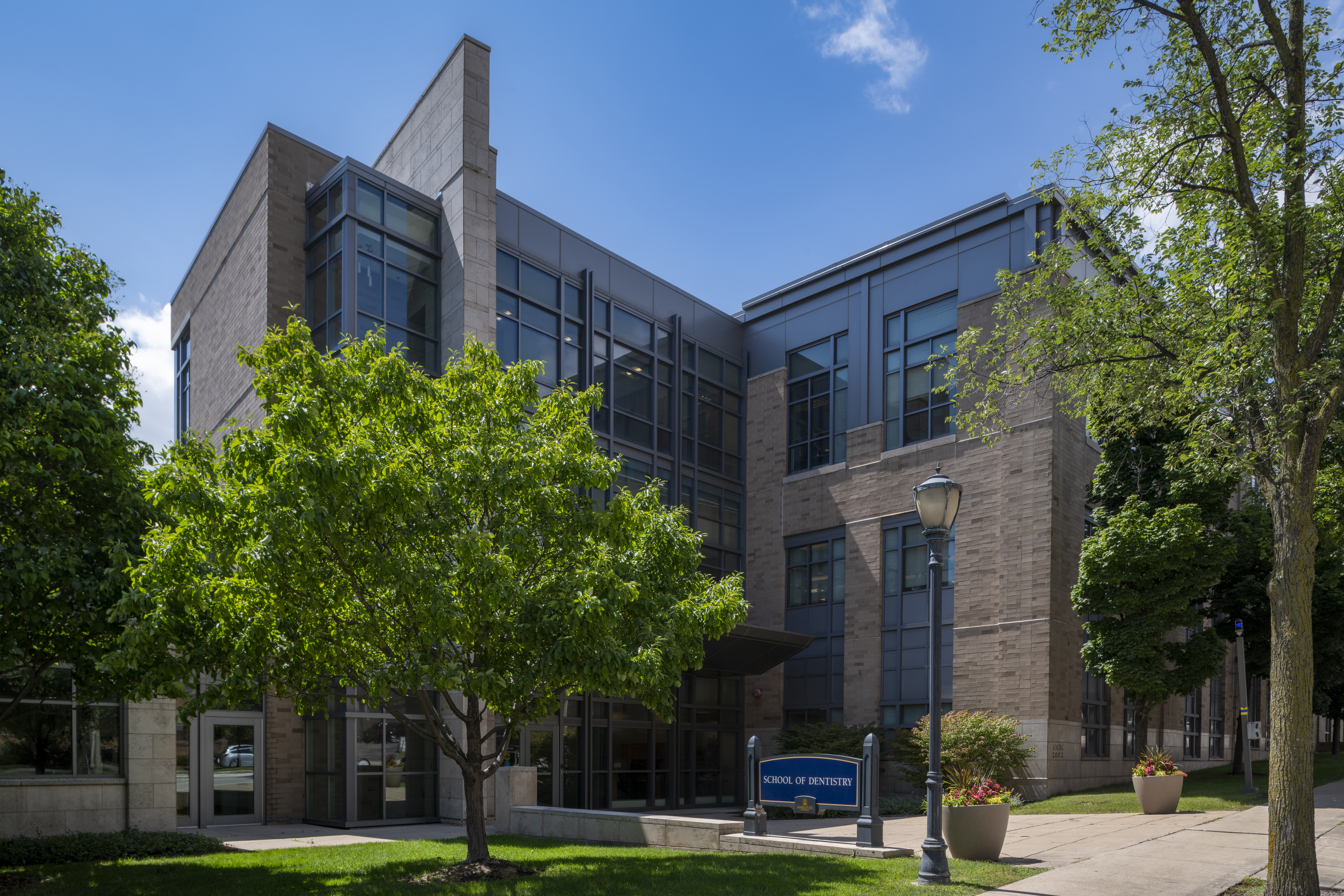
- Type: Private university
- Established: 1907
- Parent institution: Marquette University
- Dean: Dr. Elsbeth Kalenderian
- Faculty: 73 full-time
- Students: 428 (400 D.D.S., 28 M.S.)
- Location: Milwaukee, Wisconsin, United States
- Website: marquette.edu/dentistry

The Marquette University School of Dentistry is the dental school of Marquette University. It is located in Milwaukee, Wisconsin, United States. Founded as the Dental Department of the Milwaukee Medical College (MMC), the school opened on September 26, 1894. It is the only dental school in Wisconsin.

== History ==
On September 26, 1894, when the Dental Department of the Milwaukee Medical College commenced, there were nine faculty members for the 30 entering freshmen. Dean of the school was professor of oral surgery Benjamin G. Maercklein. The dental clinic consisted of 16 chairs and a technique laboratory.

In 1897, the Dental Department of the Milwaukee Medical College was recognized by the National Association of Dental Faculties.

In 1899, the Wisconsin College of Physicians and Surgeons added a dental department. Because both schools competed for students and faculty, they merged in 1913.

Henry L. Banzhaf of Wisconsin was named dean of the Dental Department in 1902, and remain in that position for 42 years.

In 1907, Milwaukee Medical College became affiliated with Marquette College, a liberal arts college in Milwaukee, which added combined dentistry, medicine, nursing, and pharmacy departments, and became a university.

In 1921, Dean Banzhaf was granted permission to build a new dental building, which would be ready in 1923. It featured 167 chairs, gaining the reputation for being the "largest dental clinic under one roof". It contained one of the first labs to be established in connection with a dental clinic. In the early 1970s, the 1921 dental facility was gutted.

In August 2002 a new dental facility was completed at 1801 W Wisconsin Ave., which had been planned around technological improvements and innovative teaching methods.

In 2003, the Marquette University School of Dentistry pioneered a patient-centered clinical curriculum.

In September 2012, the university broke ground on a 40,000-square-foot expansion. Features include an additional 24-chair clinic, an expanded faculty practice, a new 5,000-square-foot laboratory for clinical research, an expanded and upgraded simulation laboratory, a midsized classroom space, and additional student space, faculty offices, and support space.

In June 2023, Marquette University named Dr. Elsbeth Kalenderian as dean of the School of Dentistry, becoming the first woman to serve in the position.

== Academics ==
Marquette University School of Dentistry awards the following degrees:

- Master of Science in Dental Biomaterials
- Doctor of Dental Surgery

The school comprises the following departments:

- Department of Community Dental Sciences
- Department of Developmental Sciences
- Department of General Dental Sciences
- Department of Surgical & Diagnostic Sciences

Marquette School of Dentistry offers graduate programs in Dental Biomaterials, Orthodontics, Periodontics, Prosthodontics and Endodontics.

The School of Dentistry treats underserved patients at seven clinics around the state, sees 26,000 unduplicated patients annually and serves 66 of the state's 72 counties.

== Accreditation ==
Marquette University School of Dentistry is accredited by the American Dental Association.

== Admissions ==
Marquette School of Dentistry enrolls 100 freshmen each year, 50 Wisconsin residents and 50 non-residents. The school received nearly 2,700 applicants from all 50 states and several countries for the Class of 2028.
