= American Student Dental Association =

- Formation: 1971
- Type: Professional association
- Headquarters: Chicago, Illinois
- Location: United States
- Members: Dental students
- Official language: English
- President: Shafa Nathani
- Staff: 17
- Website: ASDAnet.org

The American Student Dental Association (ASDA) is a national student-run organization that is concerned with the rights, interests, and welfare of dental students. It has the aim of introducing students to lifelong involvement in organized dentistry and provides services, information, education, representation, and advocacy.

ASDA was established to connect, support and advance the needs of dental students. ASDA represents 92 percent of all students from 66 U.S. dental schools. In 2018, the association had over 24,000 members, including 22,000 dental students and almost 2,000 predental students. The association also has a membership category for international dental students.

== History ==
In February 1970, the Student American Dental Association (SADA) was formed.

Eventually many dental schools in the United States would automatically enroll their dental students in the association, resulting in a high proportion of dental students being members of the association.

1969: Inception

Many of the teaching faculty and clinical instructors for dental schools at that time had served in the Armed Forces and were committed to an authoritarian style of ‘schooling’ and an archaic form of education. Schools had strict personal grooming rules about facial hair, attire, and length of hair; and some institutions even subjected their students to fingernail inspections. The student bodies were mostly white, middle-class males with very few women and minority students. There was no system of due process - students could be expelled for any reason with no available recourse. Given a host of such inequities, it became self-evident that dental students needed to organize, a trend which could already be found within several dental school campuses throughout the country. However, dental students (unlike their colleagues in the other health professions) lacked an overarching national organization to nurture and promote such efforts.

In 1969 the federal government, through the Appalachian Regional Commission (ARC), initiated a Manpower Development and Recruitment Project - a multi-disciplinary health care initiative. The ARC was established under the authority of The Appalachian Regional Development Act of 1965, an Act of Congress administered by the Sec. of the U.S. Dept. of Health and Human Services. In 1969, the ARC was authorized to fund a rural health demonstration project in 29 counties in three states (under Section 202) for a select group of health profession students which required the inclusion of medicine, pharmacy, nursing, veterinary science, and dentistry. This demonstration project was to be administered by the Student American Medical Association (SAMA). When organizers attempted to invite the dental student association, they found that no such group existed. At the time, Chuck Payton, the president of SAMA from the Medical School at the University of California at San Francisco, and Ray Sattler, the president of the Student American Pharmacy Association (also from UCSF), approached Dennis Spain (a junior at the UCSF Dental School). They explained that they needed to include dental students and asked him if he would agree to start a national association. Spain agreed, and each organization contributed advice and a modicum of financial support for his travel and other expenses. Spain decided to call his new group the Student American Dental Association (SADA), emulating the format used by the medical and pharmacy students.

Later that year, Spain, Payton, and Sattler attended a planning meeting sponsored by the ARC in Washington, D.C., in September where they met David Evaskus, a senior dental student from the University of Illinois. Evaskus agreed to help Spain to recruit dental students from around the country to attend a founding and organizational meeting for SADA. In the spirit of the Appalachia Project, they decided to focus on students with an interest in extra-curricular public health and community service (at the time, a relatively new area of interest for dental students), rather than traditional student leadership such as class officers and student councils. In the end, and after many phone calls, they were successful in gaining cooperation from about half of the total dental schools in the country. It was decided that Chicago was the best, and most feasible location, and with the support of Dean Seymour Yale, Evaskus was able to secure the U. of I. Dental School for the weekend of Feb. 14-15, just prior to the Midwinter Meeting of the Chicago Dental Society.

1970: Progress is Made

At the behest of his Dean, Evaskus recruited Warren Smith, a freshman dental student, to help with the housing and local transportation logistics. Students from approximately 30 dental schools participated in the meeting supported by meager travel stipends from their individual schools. This was not a 5-star event. A bunch of students crashed on the floor of Evaskus’ small apartment and a bunch crashed at Smith’s parents’ house. However, these informal, crowded accommodations had one fortuitous and unanticipated benefit – drinking beer and sharing ‘war stories’ until the wee hours of the night. They each discovered that they were not alone in their grievances about dental school. Their stories were not unique. They were all suffering from the same syndrome, and this was an opportunity to do something about it. Undergraduate dental education in 1970 could be characterized as a clash of contrasts – with a traditional faculty and curriculum on the one hand, and an atypical, more enlightened, and sophisticated group of students on the other hand, who were not shy about challenging the status quo. Virtually every school was staffed with part-time instructors and retired dentists. Few, if any faculty members had any training in educational principles and modalities. Teaching methods had changed little from the 1950’s and yet the quality and diversity among students was dramatically different. Starting in the mid-60’s, dental schools had been admitting accomplished students, many with previous careers, who expected their dental school experiences to match the rigor and sophistication of their predental academics. Rote memorization, unsupported indoctrination and hazing, and poorly designed curricula were just not acceptable. What had begun as a recruitment program for an Appalachian summer project soon became an independent organized movement that would pose a meaningful challenge to the dental education establishment and the ADA.

SADA was officially launched that weekend with a robust, idealistic platform and purpose: to recruit students to serve in federal health care projects; to gather information and focus on local student issues; to formulate broad policy positions; and to coordinate student lobbying efforts on educational, public health, and professional issues. Until a national House of Delegates could be convened, the Chicago participants adopted an interim Constitution and Bylaws, and the following Mission Statement: “The Student American Dental Association is the voice of the American dental student. Our goal is to improve the dental education experience with representation, advocacy, and leadership opportunities for dental students regardless of campus or level of training. We also believe in a broader view of our place in society, and our obligation to serve those in need. As such, we promote off-campus community and interdisciplinary health programs as essential service components of our education.”

The fledgling organization was loosely divided into regions across the United States. Some of the students volunteered to be ‘regional coordinators’ in order to facilitate communications, but there were no formal titles or designations given, nor was there a formal Board of Directors. Spain was elected as President; Jack Tenenbaum from Pitt as the VP; Dennis Loman from Iowa as the Treasurer; and Michael Freid from Indiana as Secretary, (although shortly thereafter, Harry Martin from Marquette assumed the Secretary position). Although Evaskus (who was close to graduation and at the doorstep of his Oral Surgery Residency) chose to no longer be involved, there is no question that he, along with Smith and Spain must be recognized as the Co-Organizers of that first convention. The next logical step was to create a formal House of Delegates structure and host a national meeting of Delegates. SADA officers decided that the best date and venue would be later that year in October to coincide with the annual meeting of the ADA in Las Vegas.

What did SADA actually do during that first year? Under the leadership of its VP, Jack Tenenbaum, students were recruited to serve in the aforementioned SAMA-sponsored Appalachia Project. SADA also recruited Jonathan Nash, a junior dental student at NYU, as their Chairman of Dental Licensure Reform. Nash had formed a student-dentist alliance called the National Council for the Improvement of Dental Licensure which was devoted to publicizing factual data about the inequities in the licensure system as well as lobbying for change on the national and state levels. This liaison enabled SADA to promote a credible national advocacy platform right out of the gate; one which was already of direct concern to all dental students.

There were other first-year accomplishments that were not publicly known nor widely discussed outside the central core of student activists. Lobbying inside the ADA, the AADS, and the ADTA with minimal resources was time consuming and frustrating. The concept of dental students organizing beyond their individual campuses was an unexpected development which triggered organizational pushback. This required student leadership to implement creative strategies both within and without 211 E. Chicago Ave. For example, Smith established working relationships inside the AADS and the ADA, and was able to identify alliances and points of resistance; and Spain communicated with dental school Deans and local campus-based student organizations to maintain momentum for a national convention. Although it was widely circulated that SADA had 13,000 student members, that was more of a public relations gambit than anything real and substantive. That number merely represented an inflated total of ‘interested’ dental students from around the country. In reality, there was no official list of dues-paying, “card-carrying” members of SADA.

The major challenge that first year was to establish legitimacy and financial support. Although official recognition from the ADA was not as yet forthcoming, positive momentum was building in other circles. In March 1969, the American Association of Dental Schools (AADS) had decided to initiate plans for their own student membership section. The AADS invited each dental school to choose (not elect) a student representative to attend its Annual Session in NY in March 1970. Dental students from approximately 30 dental schools met with the AADS Executive Council to put in motion plans for a formal student section, and in the interim they elected transition officers. The Student Section was formalized the next year at the AADS Meeting in Chicago, supported by a grant of approximately $100,000 from the Kellogg Foundation. The AADS Student Section was primarily focused on educational issues and was never intended to be an electoral-based organization that was representative of the broad interests of the rank-and-file dental student population. However, its very existence helped to legitimize the idea of an officially recognized dental student group, and gave the ADA cover to respond in-kind. In addition, SADA lobbying efforts were making progress in generating sponsorship interest from the American Dental Trade Association (ADTA).

Negotiations

The ADA was obviously aware that students had created their own independent organization, and decided that it might be prudent to engage with the fledgling organization in some manner. Shortly after their February organizational meeting, SADA national officers met with ADA staff in Chicago to discuss the potential for financial support and possible summer internship opportunities at the ADA headquarters. The ADA offered SADA a total of just $1,000 to help defray their travel expenses, but no other substantive progress was made. The ADA Executive Director, C. Gordon Watson, made it very clear that he was not convinced that a formal student section was worthy of further discussion. Although somewhat discouraged, SADA officers got wind that the ADA Council on Dental Education was very supportive and had urged the ADA to cooperate with SADA. There was hope. However, during the ensuing months, SADA leaders became increasingly concerned that their notion of a completely independent student organization would not be able to survive without increased financial support from other sources. SADA wanted to maintain its functional independence from the ADA, just as medical and pharmacy students had done vis-a-vis their parent organizations, but efforts to secure enough funding to support its planned national convention had fallen short. The American Dental Trade Association (ADTA) had considered giving SADA a $10,000 grant, but the funds never came through. SADA leaders had reason to believe that ADA pressure was blocking this source of support. Money from SAMA, two San Francisco Bay-area foundation grants, and the meager ADA travel subsidy was insufficient to sustain SADA’s organizational plans. The plans for a House of Delegates Meeting in October had to be put on hold.

1971: The ADA Responds and ASDA is Born

Faced with pressure from the ADTA and the real possibility that SADA might succeed in securing independent sources of funding, the ADA began developing its own plans. The ADA Board of Trustees authorized the formation of an Office of Student Affairs, which was directed to contact every dental school requesting them to send student representatives to an organizational meeting at ADA Headquarters in Feb. 1971; the purpose of which was to bring student leaders together from all over the country to formalize the structure and mechanisms for formal input into the American Dental Association. Dental school deans were asked to hold campus-wide elections for delegates, and all 53 dental schools were represented.

The ADA paid for the travel and lodging expenses for all the delegates. A significant number of the attendees were participants from the SADA convention the previous year, including all of SADA’s core group: Spain from UCSF, Martin from Marquette, Tenenbaum from Pitt, Smith from Illinois, and Loman as the delegate from Iowa. Their presence insured that there would be some continuity, at least in spirit, between SADA and this new iteration sponsored by the ADA.

In addition to touring ADA facilities and electing officers, the delegates were divided into three working groups to address various fundamental structural issues and to create a template for the new organization. There was much that needed to be accomplished that weekend in a very short period of time, including the signing of official documents. Progress was being made between ADA staff and the student delegates until the discussions regarding the name of the new organization reached an impasse. The ADA, through its Office of Student Affairs, was advocating to use the name ASDA. However, a significant number of the students wanted to keep the name of SADA as a show of independence. Martin, an ex-SADA officer himself, reminded his colleagues that the potential for what they would be able to accomplish moving forward was more important than digging in their heels over the name. The group reached a consensus on several areas with which to focus their efforts: development of summer internships in dental administration; development of a “standard of dental professionalism” for dental students; recruitment of disadvantaged students; licensure reform; student financial aid; establishment of a liaison with related organizations in the dental field and other student organizations; and participation in some capacity in Council, Board of Trustees, and House of Delegates meetings.

The culmination of the conference was the official formation of the American Student Dental Association (ASDA). Martin was elected as its 1st President; Guy Bates from the Univ. of Mo. in KC as VP; Lou Proffitt from the Univ. of Pa. as Treasurer (who went on to become the 1ST President of the Student National Dental Association in 1972); Richard Featherstone from UCSF as Secretary; Smith was appointed as Editor of the ASDA Newsletter and given a ‘non-elected seat’ on the Board of Directors. Nash was appointed as Chairman of Dental Licensure Reform, and Tenenbaum as Chairman of Community Health. Nine Regional Directors were chosen and given seats on the Board. Although this new student group had obtained the ADA’s approval and nominal support, there was much work to be done to secure the viability and credibility of the organization.

Given these circumstances, it was obvious to Spain and the other original officers, that there was no longer a need for SADA to continue. Although it was in existence for just one year, the founders of the organization considered it to be a qualified success. They had fulfilled their obligation to their medical and pharmacy school colleagues by helping them to secure their ARC grant and by participating in an important public service effort in Appalachia. Of equal import, they had created an opportunity for friendship, open communication, and the sharing of information and grievances between student leaders from all over the country. The founders of SADA fully realized that having failed to secure significant financial support, their hopes for an independent national organization were dashed. However, it was a consensus belief that without the existence of SADA, the ADA would not have agreed to accept a bona fide, representative student section. They had succeeded in paving the way and accelerating the timetable for a legitimate organization with meaningful student input into organized dentistry and dental education.

As President, Martin oversaw several fundamental accomplishments over the ensuing months: along with Smith (Editor in Chief) and Chuck Lockhart (Assoc. Ed.) they produced a quarterly newsletter that was shipped in bulk to every dental school and was ASDA’s main means of connecting to its student base; he secured staff support and shared office space in the ADA building; finalized the Constitution, By Laws, and other formal documents working side-by-side with Dr. C.W. Gilman (ADA Asst. Executive Director), who proved to be an invaluable asset and ardent inside-supporter of the student group. Although sufficient financial support was a continuing challenge, creative thinking resulted in some tangible progress. Through the efforts of John Dann III, the delegate from Harvard and a Member of the Board, ASDA was able to offer its student members an ADA-sponsored $25,000 term life insurance policy for just $25; and Martin got the National Board of Dental Examiners to agree that ASDA could sell old board exams at a minimal cost to all dues-paying members. ASDA also produced a catchy decal entitled “Teeth. Love ‘em or Lose ‘em” (a parody of the right-wing, hard-hat slogan – “America, Love it or Leave it”), and sold them in bulk to dental schools and dentists throughout the country.

These funding initiatives were supplemented by ASDA membership dues (only $1), although a resolution for mandatory joint ADA-ASDA student membership was defeated by the ADA House of Delegates session in Atlantic City in October - a disappointing outcome for dental students hoping for more of a welcoming gesture from their ‘parent’ organization. However, the ADA Board of Trustees authorized a $10,000 loan to support operational and program expenses for the rest of the year. Finally, there was a positive cash flow (although barely sufficient); and at last, there was some and at last, there was sufficient financial stability to begin addressing the many substantive challenges that lay ahead.

- This historical narrative covering the founding of SADA and ASDA from 1969 - 71 was derived primarily from extensive phone interviews and email correspondence with the two main protagonists of this story – Dennis Spain, the 1st and only President of SADA (UCSF class of ’71), and Harry Martin, the 1st President of ASDA (Marquette class of ’72); as well as archival documents and publications which are cited throughout the text. Several other former officers and persons of interest also contributed helpful detail and perspective.

== Governance ==
The association is structured as a network of chapters based at each of the 66 dental schools in the United States and Puerto Rico.

In 1988, ASDA elected its first female president, N. Gail McLaurin of the Medical University of South Carolina.

In 1999, ASDA and the American Dental Education Association hosted the first National Dental Student Lobby Day. This involves students gathering in Washington, D.C. to actively lobby members of Congress.

ASDA is governed by 132 delegates (two students from each of its 66 dental school chapters). Chapters are grouped into 11 districts, each guided by an elected trustee. Each year, the delegates elect a president, two vice presidents and a Speaker of the House of Delegates. ASDA also has councils that guide the organization's work in a number of key areas.

A resolution is a formal request or action that is presented to the House of Delegates for consideration. Delegates present discussion for or against a specific resolution, then the house votes to determine the outcome.

== See also ==
- List of dental schools in the United States
