= List of Xi Psi Phi chapters =

This is the complete chapter and colony roll of Xi Psi Phi Professional Dental Fraternity. Active chapters are indicated in bold. Inactive chapter names and institutions are indicated in italic.

Chapter	Charter date and range	Institution	City	State or province	Status	Ref.
**Alpha**	February 8, 1889 – xxxx ?; 1950	University of Michigan School of Dentistry	Ann Arbor	Michigan	Active	
Delta (see Eta)	February 21, 1893 – June 1923	Baltimore Dental Surgery	Baltimore	Maryland	Consolidated	(Note: When Baltimore Dental merged into the University of Maryland School of Dentistry, Delta Chapter merged with Eta Chapter.)
Eta	December 3, 1893 – 1915; June 1923– xxxx ?	University of Maryland School of Dentistry	Baltimore	Maryland	Inactive	(Note: Delta Chapter merged with Eta Chapter in June 1923.)
**Beta**	December 14, 1893 – xxxx ?; 1972	New York University College of Dentistry	New York City	New York	Active	
Theta	December 19, 1893 – xxxx ?	Indiana University School of Dentistry	Indianapolis	Indiana	Inactive	
Epsilon	December 20, 1893 –xxxx ?; 1951	University of Iowa College of Dentistry	Iowa City	Iowa	Inactive	
Zeta (see Pi)	1893–1908	Pennsylvania Dental	Philadelphia	Pennsylvania	Consolidated	(Note: This school closed in 1909. Zeta Chapter merged with Pi Chapter at the University of Pennsylvania School of Dental Medicine in 1909, after a year of inactivity in 1908.)
**Iota**	1894	UCSF School of Dentistry	San Francisco	California	Active	
**Gamma**	February 20, 1895	Temple University School of Dentistry	Philadelphia	Pennsylvania	Active	
Lambda	March 14, 1896 – xxxx ?	Loyola University Dental School	Chicago	Illinois	Inactive	(Note: This chapter began at the Chicago College of Dental Surgery which had affiliated with Lake Forest University in 1890. In 1902, the chapter moved with the Chicago College when it began independent again. In 1905, Chicago College was affiliated with Valparaiso University until the university went bankrupt in 1918. Chicago College merged with Loyola University Dental School in 1926.)
Kappa	1897–xxxx ?	Ohio State University College of Dentistry	Columbus	Ohio	Inactive	
Mu	April 1898–1966	University at Buffalo School of Dental Medicine	Buffalo	New York	Inactive	
Nu	January 19, 1899 – 1915	Harvard School of Dental Medicine	Boston	Massachusetts	Inactive	
Omicron first	February 25, 1899 – 1925	Royal College of Physicians and Surgeons of Canada	Ottawa	Ontario, Canada	Moved	(Note: The still-extant "Royal College" relinquished the role of educating Canadian dental students when that function was shifted to Toronto and other institutions. Dental educators from the Royal College become the dental faculty of the University of Toronto in 1925. The Omicron chapter moved with the dental program.)
Pi	1899–xxxx ?	University of Pennsylvania School of Dental Medicine	Philadelphia	Pennsylvania	Inactive	
Rho	1900–xxxx ?	Northwestern University Dental School	Evanston	Georgia	Inactive	(Note: Northwestern University Dental School closed in 2001.)
Tau	1901–xxxx ?	University of Washington School of Dentistry	Seattle	Washington	Inactive	
Sigma	1902–1955	University of Illinois at Chicago College of Dentistry	Chicago	Illinois	Inactive	
Xi	March 5, 1904 – 1962	Medical College of Virginia	Richmond	Virginia	Inactive	(Note: The Medical College of Virginia merged with the Richmond Professional Institute to form Virginia Commonwealth University in 1968.)
Upsilon	1905–1926	Ohio College of Dental Surgery	Cincinnati	Ohio	Inactive	(Note: Upsilon chapter closed when the Ohio College of Dental Surgery closed in 1926.)
Phi	1905–19xx ?; 1942–1999	University of Minnesota School of Dentistry	Minneapolis	Minnesota	Inactive	
**Chi**	1905	University of Missouri–Kansas City School of Dentistry	Kansas City	Missouri	Active	
Psi	1905–1971	University of Nebraska Medical Center College of Dentistry	Lincoln	Nebraska	Inactive	
Omega	1905–1926	Vanderbilt University Dental School	Nashville	Tennessee	Inactive	(Note: Omega chapter closed when Vanderbilt's Dental School closed in 1926.)
Alpha Alpha	1906–1910	Detroit Medical College Dental Department	Detroit	Michigan	Inactive	(Note: The Detroit Medical College Dental Department was discontinued in June 1909. The Alpha Alpha chapter closed shortly afterward.)
Alpha Beta	1906–1912	Baltimore Medical College Dental Department	Baltimore	Maryland	Inactive	(Note: The Baltimore Medical College Dental Department merged with the University of Maryland in 1913. The Alpha Beta chapter did not survive the merger.)
Alpha Gamma (see Alpha Theta)	1907–1911	University of Southern California School of Dentistry	Los Angeles	California	Inactive	
Alpha Delta	1907–1911	New Orleans College of Dentistry	New Orleans	Louisiana	Moved	(Note: The New Orleans College of Dentistry went dormant. The Alpha Delta chapter was reorganized as Alpha Nu at Tulane; however, that school has since discontinued its dental school.)
**Alpha Epsilon**	1908	Oregon Health & Science University School of Dentistry	Portland	Oregon	Active	
Alpha Zeta	1912–1916	Southern Dental College	Atlanta	Georgia	Inactive	(Note: Southern Dental College merged with Atlanta Dental College. Neither chapter survived, and Atlanta College closed.)
Alpha Eta	1912–1916	Atlanta Dental College	Atlanta	Georgia	Inactive	
Alpha Theta (see Alpha Gamma)	1914–xxxx ?	Herman Ostrow School of Dentistry of USC	Los Angeles	California	Inactive	
Alpha Iota	1914–1917	Eastern Kentucky State Normal School	Richmond	Kentucky	Inactive	(Note: The Xi Psi Phi chapter list notes this dental school became part of the Louisville College of Dentistry, now a department of the University of Louisville. However, Louisville College did not open until 1917, the year the chapter went dormant.)
Alpha Kappa	1915–xxxx ?	Creighton University School of Dentistry	Omaha	Nebraska	Inactive	
Alpha Lambda	1917–1918	College of Jersey City Dental Department	Jersey City	New Jersey	Inactive	
Alpha Mu	1917–xxxx ?	George Washington University School of Medicine & Health Sciences	Washington	District of Columbia	Inactive	
Alpha Nu	1918–1926	Tulane University, Dental Department	New Orleans	Louisiana	Inactive	(Note: Alpha Delta was the re-establishment of the Alpha Nu chapter at the New Orleans College of Dentistry which had closed. However, Tulane discontinued its dental school in 1926.)
Alpha Xi	1919–1969	Georgetown University School of Dentistry	Washington	District of Columbia	Inactive	
**Alpha Omicron**	1921–1947, 1969	University of Tennessee College of Dentistry	Memphis	Tennessee	Active	
**Alpha Pi**	1921	Texas A&M University Baylor College of Dentistry	Dallas	Texas	Active	
Alpha Rho	1922–1973	Colorado College of Dental Surgery	Denver	Colorado	Inactive	(Note: The Colorado College of Dental Surgery closed when the University of Colorado School of Dental Medicine was established as the state's only dental school in 1973.)
Alpha Sigma	1922–xxxx ?	Case School of Dental Medicine	Cleveland	Ohio	Inactive	
**Alpha Tau**	1924	Columbia University College of Dental Medicine	Manhattan	New York	Active	
Alpha Upsilon	1924–xxxx ?	University of Pittsburgh School of Dental Medicine	Pittsburgh	Pennsylvania	Inactive	
**Omicron**	1925	University of Toronto Faculty of Dentistry	Toronto	Ontario, Canada	Active	
**Alpha Phi**	1926	University of the Pacific Arthur A. Dugoni School of Dentistry	San Francisco	California	Active	
Alpha Chi	1930–19xx ?	Loyola University New Orleans Dental School	New Orleans	Louisiana	Inactive	(Note: The School of Dentistry at Loyola of New Orleans closed in 1970.)
**Alpha Psi**	1930	University of Texas School of Dentistry	Houston	Texas	Active	
Alpha Omega	1943–1974	Saint Louis University, School of Dentistry	St. Louis	Missouri	Inactive	(Note: The Saint Louis University School of Dentistry closed.)
**Beta Alpha**	1947–1973, xxxx ?	University of Washington School of Dentistry	Seattle	Washington	Active	
Beta Beta	1952–xxxx ?	UNC School of Dentistry	Chapel Hill	North Carolina	Inactive	
Beta Gamma	1953–1961	UAB School of Dentistry	Birmingham	Alabama	Inactive	
Beta Delta	1954–xxxx ?	Tufts University School of Dental Medicine	Boston	Massachusetts	Inactive	
Beta Epsilon	1957–1967	University of Detroit Mercy School of Dentistry	Detroit	Michigan	Inactive	
Beta Zeta first	1959–1973, xxxx–2013	New Jersey College of Medicine and Dentistry	South Orange	New Jersey	Moved	(Note: Beta Zeta chapter formed at the Seton Hall College of Medicine and Dentistry which was renamed the University of Medicine and Dentistry of New Jersey in 1965. On July 1, 2013, the university closed and its dental program merged with Rutgers School of Dental Medicine, the current location of the chapter.)
Beta Eta	1962–1972	University of Puerto Rico School of Dental Medicine	San Juan	Puerto Rico	Inactive	
Beta Theta	1962–xxxx ?	West Virginia University School of Dentistry	Morgantown	West Virginia	Inactive	
Beta Iota	1963–xxxx ?	University of Manitoba	Winnipeg	Manitoba, Canada	Inactive	
Beta Kappa	1972–xxxx ?	Medical University of South Carolina College of Dental Medicine	Charleston	South Carolina	Inactive	
**Beta Lambda**	1973	Dental School at the University of Texas Health Science Center at San Antonio	San Antonio	Texas	Active	
**Beta Mu**	1985	Southern Illinois University School of Dental Medicine	Alton	Illinois	Active	
**Beta Nu**	19xx ?	Stony Brook University School of Dental Medicine	Stony Brook	New York	Active	
**Beta Xi**	2006 ?	Midwestern University, College of Dental Medicine-Arizona	Glendale	Arizona	Active	
**Beta Zeta**	2013	Rutgers School of Dental Medicine	Newark	New Jersey	Active	
**Beta Omicron**	2017	Midwestern University, College of Dental Medicine-Downers Grove	Downers Grove	Illinois	Active	
