= Jacob A. Salzmann =

American orthodontist (1901-1992)

Jacob Amos Salzmann (1901–1992) was an American orthodontist who is known for developing an assessment index for determining malocclusion. This index has been adopted by ADA Council of Dental Health, the Council on Dental Care Programs, and by the American Association of Orthodontists.

== Life ==
He attended the University of Pennsylvania School of Dental Medicine and received his dental degree in 1923. He was in General Dentistry practice for 7 years and he then went to New York City and became an associate of Martin Dewey. He also worked with John Mershon and George Callaway. He was Editor-in-Chief for the New York Journal of Dentistry for 26 years. He was the founder and director of the Cleft Palate Clinic at Mount Sinai Hospital (Manhattan), New York City. He was fellow of the American Association for the Advancement of Science, American College of Dentists, International College of Dentists, Society for Research in Child Development, and New York Academy of Dentistry. He also represented the Orthodontists Public Health Committee at several White House conferences in 1950, 1960 and 1970. In addition, he was the adviser to the United States Public Health Service during his career.

Salzmann focused his research on caries frequency and tooth shifting after loss of first molars, dentofacial growth in children on fluoridated and fluoride-free water, dentofacial anomalies of systemic and endocrine origin, genetics and dentofacial anomalies. Salzmann was an outspoken advocate of early dental and orthodontic treatment for children in 1920s and 1930s.

He died at the age of 91.

== Positions and awards ==
- American Association of Orthodontists, President
- American Board of Orthodontics, President
- Albert H. Ketcham Award, 1966
- Distinguished Service Award, 1961 and 1974
- Henry Spenadel Award by New York Dental Society

== Textbooks ==
- Principles and Practice Public Health Dentistry, 1937
- Orthodontics: Principles and Prevention, 1943
- Orthodontics: Practice and Techniques, 1950
- Practice of Orthodontics, 1967
- Orthodontics in Daily Practice, 1975
- Roentgenographic Cephalometrics, 1961
- Orthodontics to Rhinoplasty-New Concepts, 1970
