= George W. Hahn =

American orthodontist

George Walter Hahn (September 11, 1894 – October 24, 1977) was an American orthodontist who graduated from Angle School of Orthodontia in 1921. He served as president of California Dental Association and American Association of Orthodontists.

== Life ==
Hahn was born in Murphys, California, in 1894. He joined the Navy in 1918, after which he was stationed at the Naval Training Station in San Diego during World War I for about a year. He graduated from University of California College of Dentistry in 1919, after which he worked at private practice in Berkeley, California. Hahn then attended Angle School of Orthodontia and graduated from there in 1921. He was married to Dorothy and they had two daughters named Margaret and Dowrene.

== Career ==
Hahn was an active member of the Northern California component of Angle Society. He played a key role in the first annual reunion of Angle School in Pasadena, California. Hahn served as the chairman of Northern Component of Angle Society when Edward Angle presented his newly developed edgewise appliance. He modified Angle's ribbon arch mechanism by banding the premolars for cases in which he did extractions.

Hahn served as assistant professor at University of California Dental School in 1930 and then served as chairman of the program before World War II. In his career, Hahn published about 50 articles on clinical orthodontics. One of his most well-known works is the article called Retention, the Stepchild of Orthodontia which was published in 1943 in Angle Orthodontist.

Hahn moved back to Berkeley, where he worked at private practice until his retirement in 1964. He died at the age of 83 following a brief illness after cerebral hemorrhage.

== Awards ==
- Albert Ketcham Award in 1968
