= Allan G. Brodie =

American dentist and orthodonist

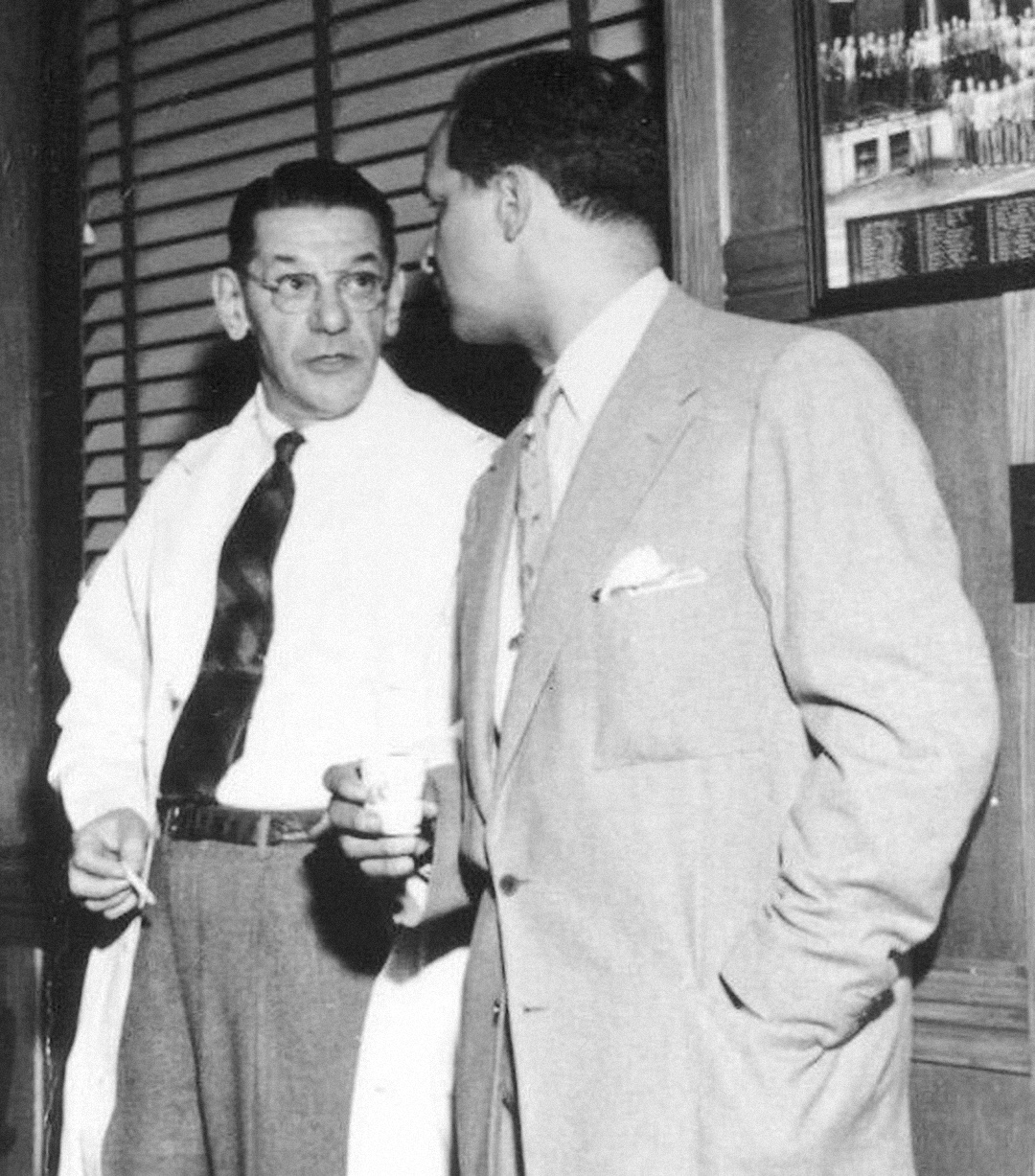
Brodie (left), with colleague Earl W. Renfroe. (Photo courtesy UIC College of Dentistry.)

Allan Gibson Brodie (October 31, 1897 in New York City – January 2, 1976) was an American dentist and orthodonist.

An orthodontics teacher, writer, and researcher, Brodie served in a variety of professional positions, such as President of the Chicago Association of Orthodontics, served on advisory boards, achieved a number of professional awards, and was a member of the American Association of Orthodontists (AAO), where he established the Prize Essay Award to promote research.

== Education ==
After earning his DDS (Doctor of Dental Surgery) degree from the University of Pennsylvania School of Dental Medicine in 1919, he began practicing dentistry in Newark, NJ, the next year. Brodie studied under Edward Angle, the "father of orthodontics," at the Angle School of Orthodontia in Pasadena, California, in 1925 and 1926, and matriculated in the school's final graduating class. Brodie, in turn, often referred to the Angles as his foster parents.

In 1923, he married Vera Elizabeth Smock. They had three children.

== Professional life ==
Brodie returned to practice in Newark, but in 1929 he was invited by Dean Frederick Bogue Noyes came to the University of Illinois College of Dentistry to organize its Department of Orthodontics—one of the first graduate orthodontics departments established in the United States. The Journal of the Charles H. Tweed International Foundation called Noyes' hiring of Brodie the beginning of "the golden age of orthodontics," and considered the department under Brodie "the West Point of orthodontics." The Journal also noted that the establishment of the Department of Orthodontics at the University of Illinois College of Dentistry "marked the fulfillment of Dr. Edward Angle lifelong ambition—to provide a broader and more scientific foundation for the practitioners of his specialty." Brodie ran the department until 1966, and was Dean of the College from 1944 to 1956, while also maintaining a private practice.

Brodie received his MS (Master of Science) degree in anatomy and histology from the university in 1934, and his PhD in anatomy in 1940.

At the time of his death on January 2, 1976, Brodie was writing his own book on orthodontics. In 2004, The Dentofacial Complex (UIC College of Dentistry Press) was published after being completed by alumni, faculty, and staff of the University of Illinois at Chicago College of Dentistry.

Preceded by Howard M. Marjerison	Deans of the University of Illinois at Chicago College of Dentistry; 1944-1956	Succeeded by Isaac Schour
