= Spencer Atkinson =

American orthodontist (1886–1970)

Dr. Spencer Roane Atkinson (September 2, 1886 – October 31, 1970) was an American orthodontist and a graduate of Angle School of Orthodontia. He is best known for establishing The Spencer R. Atkinson Library of Applied Anatomy at University of the Pacific Arthur A. Dugoni School of Dentistry. The library consists of collection of 1,400 human skulls collected over past 40 years. Atkinson is also known for developing the Universal Appliance in the 1960s which led to eventual formation of the Unitek Division of 3M Company.

== Life ==
He was born in 1886 in Brunswick, Georgia His father was a dentist. He then attended Marist College and Georgia Institute of Technology in Atlanta. He earned his dental degree from Emory University. He then taught the subjects of anatomy and Orthodontics at Emory from 1917 to 1924. It was during this time that Atkinson wanted to study the anatomical changes in a skull of a child. His efforts to obtain a skull to study changes were thwarted many times due to rarity of finding a skull of a child. He then decided to personally start collecting skulls to increase his knowledge about anatomy of a child. In 1919 he purchased five juvenile human skulls from a company in Germany which aged from 3–14 years old. These were the beginnings of what became the collection that is now held at University of Pacific School of Dentistry. Dr. Edward Angle impressed by Atkinson's knowledge of anatomy invited him to study orthodontics at the school in Pasadena. Atkinson joined the school in 1920 and four years later, he moved to Pasadena and began teaching as a faculty at Angle School of Orthodontia in 1924. Atkinson became the Director of the Orthodontic Program established at University of Southern California in 1934 and stayed at that position until 1954.

== Career ==
During his six years of teaching, he taught students the technique and etiology of malocclusion. During his teaching, Dr. Atkinson was perplexed with the amount of heavy forces used to move human teeth in practice of Orthodontia. At the same time another Orthodontist, Dr. Albin Oppenheim who was an Orthodontic Professor at University of Southern California, was practicing orthodontics with use of light pressure which allowed natural bone turnover. Influenced by Dr. Oppenheim's research, Dr. Atkinson decided to improve the orthodontic appliance and patented a design for Universal Appliance on October 28, 1929. The appliance incorporated Angle's ribbon arch and edgewise arch appliances but introduced a rectangular double-channel bracket that could hold multiple arch wires. The components of this appliance allowed light forces to be used when moving teeth.

Mr. Ret Alter, working with Dr. Atkinson. produced the appliance for working Orthodontists around the Pasadena area. The patent at that time was owned by Caltech and eventually after Ret Alter's death, Consolidated Electrodynamics Corporation purchased the business. The business at that time flourished until company eventually decided to open a new division called Unitek which was abbreviation for - The Universal Technique Appliance.

== The Spencer R. Atkinson Library of Applied Anatomy ==
After starting his collection in 1919, Dr. Atkinson kept his collection at his home in Pasadena, California in an 8-room, fireproof, air-conditioned building. Dr. Atkinson kept the collection of skulls with him for nearly 40 years. During these 40 years, he would study the facial growth patterns and dental characteristics of the different skulls and many of his publications resulted after his research on these skulls. In 1964, University of Pacific School of Dentistry acquired the skull collection. The people responsible for these negotiations were Dr. George Hollenback, Dr. John Tocchini, Dr. Robert Burns and Dr. Spencer Atkinson. The collection was initially stored in a temporary storage. After the opening of the dental school in new building in 1967, Dr. Frederick T. West became the curator of the Spencer R. Atkinson Library of Applied Anatomy. The decision to add the words "applied anatomy" was taken by Dr. Atkinson due to the contributions made by the skulls to the understanding of anatomical changes during a human life. In 1993, Spencer R. Atkinson Library was brought under an umbrella title The Institute of Dental History and Craniofacial Study. This titled housed five collections which included Spencer R. Atkinson Library of Applied Anatomy, A. W. Ward Museum of Dentistry, The James Campbell, Jr. Dental Radiology Collection, The College of Physicians and Surgeons Historical Society Collection and P & S Comparative Anatomy Collection. Currently a committee consisting of 17 members decides the policy and future planning of this Institute.

The library itself consists of 1,400 skulls. The specimens come from many different countries and range from fetal to early adulthood. The skulls are only accessible to postgraduate students, faculty and any visiting professionals in different specialties of dentistry.

== Awards ==
- Order of the Aztec Eagle, 1946 - Highest honor given to a civilian in Mexico
- Diplomate of American Board of Orthodontics
- Albert H. Ketcham Memorial Award, 1953
- Fellow of American College of Dentists, International Association of Dental Research
- University of Southern California Hall of Fame, 1979
