= Alfred Paul Rogers =

American orthodontist

Alfred P. Rogers
- Born: July 5, 1873
- Education: Pennsylvania College of Oral Surgery, Angle School of Orthodontia
- Known for: Father of Myofunctional therapy in Orthodontics, President of American Association of Orthodontists and American Academy of Dental Sciences
- Medical career
- Profession: Dentist
- Sub-specialties: orthodontics

Alfred Paul Rogers (July 5, 1873 – April 6, 1959) was an American orthodontist who was considered the father of myofunctional therapy in orthodontics. He was the president of the American Association of Orthodontists and the American Academy of Dental Sciences. He was also instrumental in forming the American Board of Orthodontics.

== Life ==
Rogers was born in Amherst, Nova Scotia, in 1873. He was the youngest of 11 children of William Henry Rogers and Mary E. Rogers. He attended Horton Academy for high school and Acadia University for undergraduate studies. He then went to the University of Toronto's Royal College of Dental Surgeons of Ontario and Pennsylvania College of Dental Surgery, where he obtained his dental degree in 1896. After starting his own practice of dentistry that year, he went on to attend Angle School of Orthodontia in 1903.

Rogers moved to Boston in 1906, where he became the first person to exclusively practice orthodontics in New England.

== Work ==
Alfred always had a deep interest in teaching and therefore he taught at Harvard School of Dental Medicine from 1918 to 1945. He was the associate professor of orthodontic research along with director of Harvard-Forsyth Postgraduate School of Orthodontics.

Alfred was greatly influenced by the work of pediatricians with children. He was impressed by the benefits from the early supervised exercises done in the treatment of children. He started exploring the effect of musculature of oral cavity on the structure of mouth. Alfred devised a system of exercises that stimulated growth in the maxillofacial region. He eventually called this therapy "myofunctional therapy in orthodontics". In 1918, at the annual meeting of American Association of Orthodontists, he presented his first paper that talked about effects of musculature on mouth. He published his last paper in 1950 which was titled "A Restatement of the Myofunctional Concept in Orthodontics".

He received honorary degrees from Acadia University (1944), and Washington University (1941). Rogers resided with his wife in their home in New Hampshire after retirement. He was a Certified Tree Farmer and a charter member of the American Tree Farm Association. The forest around his house was eventually named Alfred Paul Rogers Forest, as a living memorial for Alfred. His love for nature was displayed by many essays written by him. One of the essays named "Notes of a Countryman" was published in a book form in 1938 by Bruce Humphries.

He had two sons with his second wife, Georgina Crosby: Robert Page Rogers and Edward Saunders Rogers. Robert was a pediatrician in Greenwich, Connecticut, and Edwards was a professor of public health at the University of California. He married a third time to H. Evanel Haines in 1957.

== Awards and positions ==
- America Academy of Dental Science – president
- American Association of Orthodontists – president
- Northeastern Society of Orthodontists – president
- Albert H. Ketcham Memorial Award – 1938
