= Angle School of Orthodontia =

American orthodontics school (1899–1927)

Coordinates: 34.1638°N 118.1392°W

Angle School of Orthodonita
- Type: Academic (Certificate), research
- Established: 1899
- Principal: Edward Angle
- Students: 183
- Location: Pasadena, New York City, New London, St. Louis, United States

Angle School of Orthodontia was the first school of orthodontics in the world, established by Edward Angle in 1899. The school taught its students orthodontics over a period of 3–6 weeks. The school graduated 183 students until it closed in 1927. Among the graduates, 25 students became presidents of the American Association of Orthodontists, 11 students became head of orthodontic departments and three students became dental school deans.

== Early history ==
The idea of the school came about in the summer of 1899 during a meeting of the National Dental Association in Niagara Falls. Angle had been teaching the subject of orthodontia for many years at four different colleges but he was unable to convince the dental colleges to have a separate Department in Orthodontics. In that meeting in Niagara Falls, Henry E. Lindas, Thomas B. Mercer, Herbert A. Pullen and Milton A. Watson approached Angle and asked him to teach them orthodontics in St. Louis for three weeks. The course was repeated in 1900 with the original four serving as instructors to seven more students. This became the nation's first school of orthodontics and was located at 1107 N. Grand Avenue, St. Louis, Missouri. This year the members of the class organized a society and named it "The Society of Orthodontists" which was later renamed to be what it is known today as American Association of Orthodontists.

In 1903, Dr. Anna Hopkins, Angle's longtime secretary was elected as the first secretary of the Society. In 1906, she became Mrs. Edward Hartley Angle.

The students of the school studied histology, anatomy, biology, physiology and their relation to orthodontics. In 1907, after the awarding of degrees of about 94 students in 8 years, the school was moved to New York City. Only one class graduated in that location. In 1908, the school moved to New London, Connecticut. The lectures here were held at Munsey Building until 1911 and in 1912 at the Harbor School. During teaching, Angle's health faded and he decided to move away from the East Coast and left for Pasadena, California. In 1918, Angle purchased a Craftsman home where the school was eventually moved. Classes started again in 1920 and orthodontists such as Cecil C. Steiner, Spencer Atkinson, and George W. Hahn graduated from this class. These three graduates stayed to teach at the school following their graduation. While learning at Angle's home, Dr. Anna Hopkins was given the name "Mother Angle'' by the students of the school because of her kind-hearted nature.

In 1922, the students of the school established an association after Angle known as Angle Society of Orthodontics. The same year, students of the school raised $6400 to design a new home for the school with bigger classrooms at the northwest corner of Angle's property. On January 9, 1923, the society held its inauguration meeting at Angle's home. At this meeting, many famous businessmen came and attended case discussions given by Angle's students. In 1924 the school officially received a charter from State of California to be established as a school and finally known as Angle College of Orthodontia.

The first five directors of the American Board of Orthodontics (ABO) were graduates from this school. The first seven recipients of the Albert H. Ketcham Award were also graduates from this school.

== Notable graduates ==
- Albert Ketcham
- Alfred Paul Rogers
- Albin Oppenheim
- Allan G. Brodie
- Cecil C. Steiner
- Charles A. Hawley
- Charles H. Tweed
- Copeland Shelden
- Dean Harold Noyes
- Frank A. Gough
- Frank M. Casto
- Frederick Bogue Noyes
- Frederick Lester Stanton
- George W. Hahn
- Harry Estes Kelsey
- Harold Chapman (Orthodontist)
- Herbert A. Pullen
- Holly Broadbent Sr.
- John Mershon
- Lloyd Steel Lourie
- Martin Dewey
- Milo Hellman
- Raymond Begg
- Robert Strang
- Spencer Atkinson
