= William B. Downs =

American orthodontist

- Born: May 1, 1899; Chicago, Illinois, U.S.
- Died: January 13, 1966 (aged 66–67)
- Education: University of Illinois at Chicago College of Dentistry
- Occupations: Orthodontist, Professor
- Organizations: American Association of Orthodontists; Edward Angle Society of Orthodontia; Tweed Foundation; Chicago Association of Orthodontists
- Known for: Downs Cephalometric Analysis
- Awards: Albert H. Ketcham Award (1961); Award of Merit, Chicago Association of Orthodontists (1963)

William B. Downs (1899–January 13, 1966) was an American orthodontist who is known for developing the first cephalometric analysis for orthodontics, the Downs analysis.

== Life ==
He was born in 1899 in Chicago, Illinois and was the oldest of three children. He moved to Batavia, Illinois in 1904 with his family where his father established his practice as a dentist. Downs went to Batavia High School (Batavia, Illinois) and became interested in studying agriculture. He went to Two Dot, Montana where he oversaw a sheep ranch for his father. Downs then returned to Illinois after two years and enrolled himself in the University of Illinois at Chicago College of Dentistry. He received his dental degree in 1926. He became a professor in the Crown and Bridge Department of the dental school at UIC for the next four years. He then enrolled himself in the first class of graduate orthodontics at the dental school and graduated with a master's degree in 1931.

== Career ==
He then taught orthodontics at the UIC College of Dentistry until 1955. Dr. Downs was interested in facial growth and development throughout his career. He worked on the "Cephalometric Appraisal of Treated Result and Variations in Facial Relationships: Their Significance in Treatment and Prognosis. This paper won him first prize from the American Association of Orthodontists in 1948, and it led to the first cephalometric analysis in the field of orthodontics. Dr. Downs developed what is called Downs Cephalometric Analysis, which assesses facial growth and development through the analysis of a Cephalometric Radiographic Image.

He was a member of the Chicago Association of Orthodontists and Tweed Foundation, and an officer of the Midwestern Component of the Edward Angle Society of Orthodontia.

Dr. Downs retired in 1965 due to ill health. The UIC College of Dentistry's William Benham Downs Fund is used to support visits of lecturers in the college's Department of Orthodontics Forum Series.

== Awards ==
- Albert H. Ketcham Award, American Board of Orthodontics, 1961
- Award of Merit, Chicago Association of Orthodontists, 1963
- Executive Council of Angle Society of Orthodontia
- Diplomate of American Board of Orthodontics

== See also ==
- Cephalometric analysis
