= Charles H. Tweed =

American orthodontist (1895–1970)

- Born: June 24, 1895; New York (Manhattan), New York
- Died: January 11, 1970
- Education: Stanford University, University of California
- Known for: Founder of Charles H. Tweed Foundation for Orthodontic Research and Tweed Analysis
- Medical career
- Profession: Dentist
- Sub-specialties: orthodontics

Charles Henry Tweed (June 24, 1895 – January 11, 1970) was an American orthodontist known for many of his contributions to the field of orthodontics. He was a founder of the Charles H. Tweed Foundation for Orthodontic Research. Tweed was a student of Edward Angle in Pasadena, California and a classmate of Raymond Begg.

== Education ==
He was born in New York City in 1895. He attended Phoenix public schools until he attended Stanford University as a pre-dental student and received his D.D.S degree from University of California in 1919. After graduation, he returned to Phoenix to practice General Dentistry for next 8 years. In the year 1927, Tweed decided to join Angle School of Orthodontia after giving up his private practice. There under Edward Angle, Charles spent few years gaining knowledge of the field. He was chosen by Edward Angle to assist in preparing the edgewise bracket for introduction and manufacture. He then returned to Phoenix to work as a Private Practice Orthodontist and eventually ended up moving to Tucson, Arizona. Edward Angle, who had pancreatic cancer had died between Tweed leaving Phoenix and arriving in Pasadena. He was instructed at the Angle School by three orthodontists who had worked at the School with Angle: George Hahn, Si Kloehn and John? Terwilleger. Tweed was not a classmate of P. Raymond Begg as Begg had attended the Angle School in 1924, as confirmed in the Wikipedia entry for Begg and in the Australian Begg Society of Orthodontists web site. Begg and Tweed never met.

== Career ==
Tweed's philosophy was different than Edward Angle, his mentor. Edward Angle practiced strictly without extraction of teeth to achieve harmonious occlusion. Tweed believed that extracting teeth lead to a more harmonious profile than what Angle achieved in his practice and was the best technique to prevent orthodontic relapse. In 1940, Tweed took 100 patients and treated them without extractions. When their treatment had failed, he then treated them with extractions for no additional fee. He presented his findings in 1940 at the AAO annual meeting. According to Proffit et al., under the leadership of Charles Tweed, extraction of teeth was reintroduced into orthodontics in the 1940s and 1950s to enhance facial esthetics and occlusal relationships.

Tweed's "serial extraction" technique met with opposition from some colleagues, such as the world-renowned Dr. B. F. Dewel, later president of the American Association of Orthodontics, who termed the procedure a "mutilation" of the facial structure and critiqued Tweed's idiosyncratic ideal of beauty: a recessed face was hardly more attractive than a "full smile", he claimed. The "extraction versus non-extraction debate" became and remains the most controversial issue in the orthodontic industry, and grew especially heated after the Brimm lawsuit of 1986, in which a young Michigan woman won 1.3 million dollars from her orthodontist due to what the jury termed "mutilation" of her facial structure. The members of the American Association of Orthodontics, after this lawsuit, bonded to defend Tweed's technique, and today it continues, despite frequent challenges and extraction victim reports, to be an industry standard, with Tweed hailed as "a pioneer."

Tweed published his first article in the Angle Orthodontist journal, titled "Reports of Cases Treated with the Edgewise Arch Mechanism". He published the textbook Clinical orthodontics in 1966 which summed up over 40 years of his research and work in the field of orthodontics.

Tweed during his discussions on a particular Orthodontic subject was famous for this saying "Just put your plaster on the table" which meant Let the Treatment Speak For Itself.

== Orthodontics ==
=== Early years ===
During his early years, Tweed found that large number of his cases experienced failures either due to relapse of the corrected dentition or poor facial esthetics. Tweed's failures occurred due to expansion of the arches. Tweed believed in keeping the mandibular incisors uprighted over the basal bone and thus he would expand the arches buccally. However, due to failures Tweed resorted to extracting teeth while keeping the mandibular plane to lower incisor angle at 90 degree +/- 10 degrees. The tides turned once more, however, in the 1990s, notably after the 1986 Brimm lawsuit, in which Tweed's approach was proven to lead to serious jaw disorder and the rate of extractions halved in the United States. Today in the US it is more common to try to expand the arches first, using palate expanders, rather than resort to extractions. The rate of the practice of extractions is still high in other countries, particularly in Asia where up to 80% of cases are still done with extractions.

=== Tweed Occlusion ===
Tweed occlusion refers to an end result of an orthodontic treatment that Tweed and his followers tried to achieve when finishing treatment. He believed in maximum facial harmony and balance, defined as the lower midface being more retruded than the upper, and therefore he believed in treating the mandibular incisors over the basal bone of the mandible. Components of tweed occlusion are:

1. Flat mandibular arch
2. Maintaining the Curve of Spee in Maxillary Arch
3. Second molars in both arches tipped distally and out of occlusion with each other
4. First molars tipped distally so Mesiobuccal Cusp of Upper 1st molar lying on the buccal groove of the lower 1st molar
5. Anterior teeth close to an end-to-end relationship. He believed in maximum facial harmony and balance and therefore he believed in treating the mandibular incisors over the basal bone of the mandible.

Tweed is known for creating the Tweed Analysis.

A number of the above occlusion principles have been put in question in the last decades, particularly in France.

== Charles H. Tweed International Foundation ==
The formation of the club originated in 1941. Tweed had a study club which included few orthodontists such as Sam Lewis, Copeland Shelden, Robert H. W. Strang, Cecil C. Steiner, William B. Downs, Herbert I. Margolis, Paul Lewis and Hayes Nance. The group initially met in 1941 and 1942, and due to World War II resumed their meetings in 1946. During the 1946 meeting, Tweed's study group decided to established the Charles H. Tweed Foundation for Orthodontic Research.

The Tweed Study Course is a 10-day course offered by the Charles H. Tweed International Foundation which offers hand-on experience to students and orthodontists alike. During 1950s, admission into the course required applicants to submit a typodont setup and a treated case.

Up until 2019, the American Board of Orthodontics required an orthodontic student to present an extraction case to be qualified as an orthodontist.
