= Earl W. Renfroe =

American orthodontist

Dr. Earl Wiley Renfroe
- Born: January 9, 1907
- Died: November 14, 2000 (aged 93)
- Burial place: Arlington National Cemetery, Arlington, VA
- Occupation: Dentist
- Spouse: Hilda Forte
- Children: 3
- Honours: Distinguished Alumnus Award, UIC Dental Alumni Association in 1988 Chicago Senior Citizens Hall of Fame in 1990

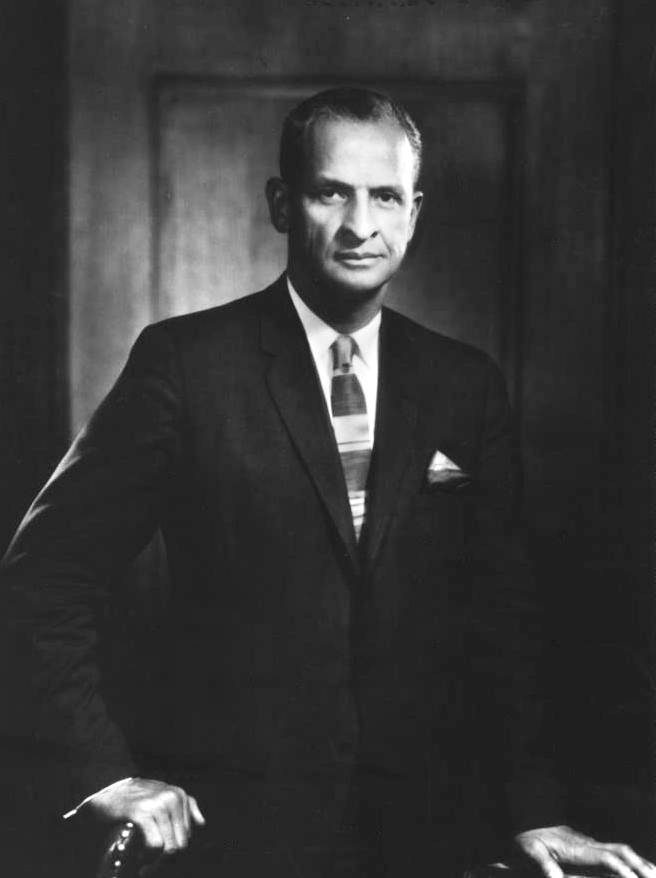
Dr. Earl W. Renfroe. (Photo courtesy UIC College of Dentistry.)

Earl Wiley Renfroe (January 9, 1907 – November 14, 2000) was an African-American dentist known as an innovator in the field of orthodontics and for breaking down the barriers of racism.

Renfroe taught at the University of Illinois at Chicago College of Dentistry from 1933 through the 1980s. For many years, he was acknowledged as one of the best hands-on clinical orthodontics instructors in the world.

In 1957, with fellow faculty member Dr. Thomas K. Barber, Renfroe wrote a seminal article on the concepts of preventive and interceptive orthodontics. Renfroe is also considered one of the "fathers of orthodontics" in Brazil.

== Early years ==
Renfroe was born in Chicago January 9, 1907, to parents Eugene and Bertha, who were employed at the post office and as a caterer, respectively. He also had two siblings, Hazel Anthony and Everett. He graduated from Austin O. Sexton Grammar School in 1921 and also from Bowen High School (Chicago) in 1924. At Bowen, he became the first African American in the school's history to attain the rank of Cadet Commander in the Reserve Officers Training Corps. He also received pre-dental training at Crane Junior College.

Renfroe became the first student at the University of Illinois at Chicago College of Dentistry to work outside the college full-time while carrying a full course load. During this time, he worked nights at the post office before graduating with a Master of Science in 1931. He joined the UIC Dentistry faculty in 1932.

In 1934 he became the first African American in Illinois, and only the third in the nation, to obtain a commercial pilot's license. He later served as an inspector for the Illinois Aeronautics Commission.

== Medical and military career ==
Once on the UIC College of Dentistry faculty, he ended the practice of students being allowed to provide dental care only for the patients of the same race as themselves.

Renfroe became certified as an orthodontic specialist in by the Illinois State Dental Board in 1948, and by the American Board of Orthodontics in 1955. He was thought to be one of the first African Americans in Illinois to specialize in this field.

During World War II, Renfroe served with the 184th field artillery division of the United States Army as the chief dental officer in Fort Huachuca, Arizona, and after the war he returned to his teaching position in Illinois. He remained in the U.S. Army Reserves thereafter, retiring as a colonel in 1968. He had joined the Illinois National Guard in 1932 and was eventually awarded the rank of general in 1984.

In 1950, Renfroe opened an office downtown in Chicago's "Loop" (downtown area), becoming not only the first African American orthodontist in the Loop, but the only African American professional in any field to have an office in Chicago's downtown at that time. Dr. Renfroe was also a member of several dental organizations including the Edward H. Angle Society of Orthodontics, American Association of Orthodontists.

In 1966, Renfroe was appointed head of the Department of Orthodontics at UIC College of Dentistry. He was also the president of the Chicago Association of Orthodontics.

== Breaking down barriers for African Americans ==
In 1966, Renfroe became the first African American to lead a department at the University of Illinois at Chicago College of Dentistry when he was named head of the Department of Orthodontics.

He was the first African American orthodontist to open an office in the Chicago downtown Loop area, and the first African American in Illinois to be licensed as a commercial aviator.

== International impact ==
In the late 1950s, Renfroe began traveling abroad to lecture on orthodontics. He eventually taught in nine countries including Brazil, and was the first U.S. dentist to be invited back to Brazil seven times. Here he is considered one of "the fathers of orthodontics." Upon being invited to Brazil the first time, he learned Portuguese so he could teach the course in the Brazilian dentists' native language.

He also lectured frequently in Argentina. One such occasion lead him to be in Buenos Aires during the revolution in the 1950s. In 1964, he was invited by the Orthodontics section of the Argentina Dental Society, to teach a two-week technical course for 24 students.

Renfroe also made 30 trips to Barbados, where a dental facility now is named for him.

== Scholarly works ==
Renfroe published many articles on orthodontics in journals such as the American Journal of Orthodontics, the Journal of the American Dental Association, and the Angle Orthodontists. In 1957, he co-authored an article on the concepts of preventive and interceptive orthodontics with fellow faculty member Thomas K. Barber of the college's Department of Pediatric Dentistry. The article was published in the Journal of the American Dental Association. In 1960, his textbook, Technique Training in Orthodontics, was published By Edwards Bros. Inc., Ann Armor, MI.

== Honours and other interests ==
In 1963, Renfroe was named as a fellow of the American College of Dentistry. In 1988, he was honoured with the Distinguished Alumnus Award by the UIC Dental Alumni Association, and two years later was inducted into the Chicago Senior Citizens Hall of Fame. He was also a member of the honorary dental fraternity Omicron Kappa Upsilon and a member of Alpha Phi Alpha fraternity.

Beyond dentistry, Renfroe had a wide range of interests. Chief among these were flying and aeronautics. Both Dr. Renfroe and his wife, Anna Renfroe, were licensed pilots. In 1936, Dr. Renfroe held a transport licence from the US Department of Commerce and was one of only three pilots at the time to hold this distinction. His wife held a limited licence. His other interests included amateur radio operation, pistol and rifle marksmanship, model locomotives, SCUBA diving, and several civil organizations.

== Personal life ==
Renfroe was married to the former Hilda Forte, who died September 13, 2000. Together they had two children son, Stephen Renfroe, and daughter Diane Renfroe. Renfroe also has one son, Earl Renfroe Jr., from a previous marriage to elementary school teacher, Anna Rosetta Lawson Renfroe in 1929. Anna Renfroe, who was also known to friends as "Billie," filed for divorce in 1938. Renfroe is buried at Arlington National Cemetery, Arlington, VA.
