= Dewey Martin =

Dewey Martin is the name of:

- Dewey Martin (musician) (1940–2009), drummer/vocalist best known for his association with the band Buffalo Springfield
- Dewey Martin (actor) (1923–2018), American film and television actor

== See also ==
- Martin Dewey (1881–1933), American orthodontist
