= Robert H. W. Strang =

American orthodontist

- Born: Robert Hallock Wright Strang; April 4, 1881; Bridgeport, Connecticut, United States
- Died: July 17, 1982 (aged 101)
- Education: University of Pennsylvania School of Dental Medicine
- Known for: First orthodontist in Connecticut
- Medical career
- Profession: Dentist
- Institutions: Western Pennsylvania Hospital
- Sub-specialties: Orthodontics

Robert Hallock Wright Strang (April 4, 1881 – July 17, 1982) was an American orthodontist. He was the first specialist in orthodontics in the state of Connecticut and practiced in Bridgeport for many years.

== Life and career ==
Strang graduated from Wilbraham Academy, Massachusetts, in 1899. He then attended the University of Pennsylvania Dental and Medical Schools in 1902 and 1904 respectively, earning his degree in both fields. After completing his internship at the Western Pennsylvania Hospital in Pittsburgh, he returned to his home state of Connecticut. He then enrolled himself in the Angle School of Orthodontia in St. Louis in 1906. After spending time with Edward Angle there, he returned to Connecticut to practice as its first orthodontic specialist. He also started teaching at the Alfred C. Fones School of Dental Hygiene. In 1947 he started the Fones School of Oral Hygiene at the University of Bridgeport. Along with teaching dental hygiene, Strang remained active in his orthodontic career, giving lectures at different universities. He started giving orthodontic lectures at Temple University until 1960.

Dr. Strang authored over 100 articles and published four editions of the book Textbook of Orthodontia. He served on the editorial board of The Angle Orthodontist for 50 years.

He died on July 17, 1982, after an illness at the age of 101 in Ann Arbor, Michigan.

== Honors ==
- American Dental Association
- Horace Wells Society of Hartford
- Albert Ketcham Memorial Award
