= Harry Estes Kelsey =

- Born: April 4, 1873
- Died: March 1, 1946 (aged 72)
- Education: University of Maryland School of Dentistry
- Known for: First orthodontist in State of Maryland
- Medical career
- Profession: Dentist
- Institutions: University of Maryland School of Dentistry
- Sub-specialties: Orthodontics

Harry Estes Kelsey (1873 – March 1, 1946) was an American orthodontist who graduated from Angle School of Orthodontia in 1908. He was the first orthodontist in the State of Maryland.

== Life ==
Kelsey received his dental degree from University of Maryland School of Dentistry. He taught at University of Maryland School of Dentistry from 1906 to 1910, while graduating from Angle School of Orthodontia in 1908. In 1910 Kelsey became a professor of orthodontics at the school, and subsequently chairman in 1913. He remained as chairman until his retirement in 1940.

Kelsey wrote 57 articles that have been published in various orthodontic journals. He was an active member of the American Association of Orthodontists, the American Dental Association, the Eastern Society of Orthodontia, and the Eastern Association of Angle Alumni.

Kelsey died at the age of 73 in 1946. The University of Maryland School of Dentistry has established a Harry E. Kelsey award in his memory.
