= Frank A. Gough =

American orthodontist

Frank A. Gough (June 28, 1872 – August 15, 1938) was an American orthodontist who graduated from Angle School of Orthodontia. He was the first person to open an orthodontic practice in the borough of Brooklyn.

== Life ==
He was born in 1872 in North East, Pennsylvania. He initially was interested in working in civil service but later became interested in dentistry. He attended New York University College of Dentistry and obtained his dental degree in 1896. He was the fourth dentist ever to get a license to practice dentistry in the State of New York. Around 1900 he became interested in orthodontics and applied to Angle School of Orthodontia in St. Louis. He eventually attended the school with his classmates Lloyd Steel Lourie, Herbert A. Pullen and Richard Summa. After his orthodontic course, Gough stayed in Hornellsville, Pennsylvania, to assist a dentist for some time. He then moved to Brooklyn, where he started his orthodontic practice in an office of his home. He was the first person to open a practice of orthodontics in Brooklyn. He practiced here for next 30 years.

He was also a Fellow of American College of Dentists and Edward H. Angle Society of Orthodontists. In 1927, Gough joined Brooklyn Rotary Club and he became the treasurer, vice-president, and president in 1926. He was also a member of New York State Crippled Children's Society and New York Mausoleum Association.

Gough was married to Allie B. Ellsworth, who died in 1937. After that incident, Gough suffered a coronary thrombosis and gave up his practice and his organization activities. He then returned to his home in North East, Pennsylvania, and eventually died in 1938. They had two daughters: Helen Gough, who practiced in Brooklyn as an orthodontist and Mrs. Charles Gough, who lived in New York.

== Positions ==
- Second District Dental Society, secretary and president
- New York Dental Society, president
- American Dental Association, president
- Brooklyn Rotary Club, secretary and president
- Jeannie L. Grant Recreation Camp Association, founder
