= Cecil C. Steiner =

American dentist

Cecil C. Steiner (June 6, 1896 – February 11, 1989) was a dentist and one of Edward H. Angle's first students in 1921. He developed a form of cephalometric analysis, presented in 1953, referred to as the Steiner method of analysis.

== Life ==
Cecil C. Steiner was born in Rancho Cucamonga, California in 1896. His father, Emil Steiner, had moved his family to California in 1904, settling in the Imperial Valley where they farmed their homestead near Brawley, California. Cecil rode a horse to a small country school of only 12 students. After graduating Brawley High School, he attended the University of California, Berkeley for his undergraduate education, commuting between Brawley and Berkeley, but this time in decidedly higher style on one of the first Harley-Davidson motorcycles.

Dr. Steiner then obtained his dental degree from the UCSF School of Dentistry at the age of 19. Soon after, he started working in Los Angeles with a local Orthodontist named Dr. Ray Robinson. Wishing to pursue formal orthodontic education, he sought out specialty training. Orthodontic schools of the era spent much time in maintenance of the primitive appliances then in use, often repairing and re-cementing bands owing to the crude nature of early materials and adhesives. He eventually went to Pasadena, California to meet and enroll himself in the nascent Angle School of Orthodontia. During the meeting, Dr. Edward Angle, an exacting and often strongly opinionated educator, asked Steiner questions about the naturalist Charles Darwin, which Steiner was unable to answer. Steiner was then summarily dismissed from the meeting, but Anna Angle, Edward's wife and decidedly more compassionate half, asked Steiner to read 20 books and to return for another meeting with Dr. Angle. He returned for that meeting and eventually became Angle's second student in his school in Pasadena. He obtained his certificate in 1921 and continued working with Angle after his graduation. While at the school Steiner worked on the Ribbon Arch appliance.

== Career ==
He is most-remember for his articles Cephalometrics for You and me (1953), Cephalometrics in Clinical Practice (1959), Use of Cephalometrics as an Aid to Planning and Assessing Orthodontic Treatment (1960). He worked at the Angle School of Orthodontia, perfecting the edgewise bracket, and associated armamentaria, that would become the standard of care in orthodontics for the next century. He was also a part-time faculty at the Orthodontic Department in UCSF School of Dentistry. He was instrumental in starting the USC Orthodontic Department with Harry L. Dougherty in 1960. The Department at USC dedicated their library to Dr. Steiner in recognition of his significant contributions to the school.

He died in 1989, at the age of 92 in Longview, Washington.

== Steiner's Analysis ==
Steiner's Analysis consists of Skeletal, Dental and Soft Tissue Analysis. The skeletal component tries to related the upper and lower to the skull and to each other. The dental component tries to relate the upper and lower incisors to each other and to their respective jaws and the soft tissue component tries to understand the lower facial profile.

=== Skeletal ===
- SNA = This angle helps determine if maxilla is positioned anteriorly or posteriorly to the cranial base
- SNB = This angle helps determine if mandible is positioned anteriorly or posteriorly to the cranial base
- ANB = This angle helps determine the relationship between maxilla and mandible to each other
- Occlusal Plane to SN = Plane that is drawn through cusps of first molars and first premolars. Average is 14 degrees
- Mandibular Plane = This plane is drawn by using Gonion (Go) and Gnathion (Gn). The average is 32 degrees. The angle that mandibular plane forms with SN plane helps determine the growth pattern of individuals.

=== Dental ===
- Maxillary Incisor Position = Relationship of upper incisors to the N-A line. Average is 22 degrees and 4 mm.
- Mandibular Incisor Position = Relationship of lower incisors to the N-B line. Average is 25 degrees and 4 mm.
- Interincisal Angle = Relates position of upper incisor to lower incisor. Average is 130 degrees.
- Lower Incisor to Chin = According to Holdway, it is the distance from the distal surface of lower incisor to the N-B line (Nasion - B Point). 4 mm is the average

=== Soft Tissue ===
- S Line (Steiner's Line) = According to Steiner, the lips should touch a line extending from the soft tissue contour of the chin to the middle of an S formed by lower border of the nose. Lips that are beyond this line are protrusive.

== Awards ==
- 1968 Albert H. Ketcham Memorial Award from the American Board of Orthodontics
- 1978 Distinguished Honor Scroll, Charles H. Tweed International Foundation for Orthodontic Research and Education
