= Herbert A. Pullen =

American orthodontist (1874–1938)

Herbert E. Pullen
- Born: February 23, 1874; Evansville, Wisconsin
- Died: February 13, 1938 (aged 63)
- Education: University of Minnesota
- Known for: Developed Pullen band-forming plier, band-removing plier and band seater
- Medical career
- Profession: Dentist
- Institutions: University of Buffalo Dental School
- Sub-specialties: Orthodontics
- Research: Growth and development

Herbert A. Pullen (February 23, 1874 – February 13, 1938) was an American orthodontist who was the graduate of the first class from Angle School of Orthodontia in 1900. Pullen is known to have developed Pullen band-forming pliers, band-removing pliers and band seater.

== Life ==
He was born in Evansville, Wisconsin, in 1873. He attended University of Minnesota School of Dentistry and received his dental degree in 1893. After that he continued practicing general dentistry in Green Bay, Wisconsin. He eventually enrolled himself at Angle School of Orthodontia, where he was part of first graduating class in 1900. He then became one of the first instructors of that institution after Edward Angle. He then moved to Boston, where he worked as an orthodontic professor in Forsyth Clinic. He eventually moved to Buffalo, New York, where he started practicing orthodontics. In addition, Pullen was an orthodontic professor at University at Buffalo School of Dental Medicine from 1919 to 1934.

Pullen was married to Claire Smith of Buffalo. He two brothers named Lester L. Pullen and Ralph Pullen. He died in St. Petersburg, Florida in 1938.

== Orthodontics ==
Pullen wrote many essays during his tenure as an orthodontist. The essays were pertaining to design of the orthodontic appliances and diagnosis of different malocclusions. Pullen over his lifetime developed appliances such as band-forming pliers, band-removing pliers and band seater. He also reintroduce the maxillary suture opening concept in 1902. Pullen is known for writing an illustration about impressions and casts which includes over 90 illustrations. Pullen also wrote a chapter in a book about operative dentistry written by C. N. Johnson in 1912.

== Awards and positions ==
- American Society of Orthodontists - president (1906–1907)
- New York Society of Orthodontists – president (1922–1923)
- Eastern Association of Graduates of Angle School of Orthodontia – member
