= John Mershon =

American orthodontist

John Valentine Mershon (July 7, 1867 – 1953) was an American orthodontist who graduated from Angle School of Orthodontia in 1908. He is the past president of American Association of Orthodontists. Mershon helped organize First International Orthodontic Congress in 1926 and served as its honorary president.

== Life ==
Mershon was born in Penn Manor District in Lancaster, Pennsylvania, in 1867, the youngest sibling of nine. He obtained his dental degree from Pennsylvania College of Dental Surgery in 1889. He served as a faculty member at the school for many years, and also practiced as a private dentist in the area. In 1896, he married Harriet Lane Worrall. He then attended Angle School of Orthodontia in 1908 and then became one of the first orthodontists in eastern Pennsylvania. He also served as head of orthodontics at the University of Pennsylvania from 1916 to 1925. He served as president of American Association of Orthodontists, the Northeastern Society of Orthodontists, the Philadelphia Orthodontic Society, where he was their first president, and the Philadelphia Academy of Stomatology.

Mershon was credited in organizing short refresher and extension courses for the members of the dental societies. He also developed the removable lingual arch appliance. In honor of Mershon, in 1960 American Association of Orthodontists established an annual series of lectures.

== Awards ==
- Jarvie Medal and Fellowship by the Dental Society of the State of New York in 1930
- Doctor of Science (honorary) by the University of Pennsylvania in 1933
- Albert Ketcham Award in 1937.
