= Frederick T. West =

American orthodontist

Frederick T. West (July 6, 1893 – January 18, 1989) was an American orthodontist and a graduate of Dewey School of Orthodontia. He was a former president of American Association of Orthodontists in 1954 and was selected 5th ever honorary member of Edward Angle Society of Orthodontists in 1965.

== Life ==
He was born in Sacramento, California, and attended Christian Brothers High School (Sacramento, California) in 1910. He attended Saint Mary's College of California, where he received his college degree in 1914. He then attended College of Physicians and Surgeons Dental School in San Francisco and graduated in 1917. After this he continued his studies at the Dewey School of Orthodontia, where he learned orthodontics for six weeks. In 1919, he started teaching at the Physicians and Surgeons School, where he served as a faculty member for 43 years. The school later changed its name to University of the Pacific Arthur A. Dugoni School of Dentistry after the school survived a financial disaster in 1923 which West saved the school from closing by loaning the school money.

== Career ==
West became the curator of a library which held Dr. Spencer Atkinson's collection of 15,000 skulls. In 1982 he received Albert H. Ketcham Memorial award, which is the highest honor in the field of orthodontics. University of the Pacific Arthur A. Dugoni School of Dentistry hosts annual lecture series in the honor of Dr. West.
