= Lloyd Steel Lourie =

American orthodontist (1877–1959)

- Born: September 3, 1877; Keokuk, Iowa
- Died: March 12, 1959 (aged 85)
- Education: Keokuk Dental College
- Known for: Developing high labial arch appliance, wire-stretching pliers
- Medical career
- Profession: Dentist
- Institutions: University of Maryland School of Dentistry
- Sub-specialties: Orthodontics

Lloyd Steel Lourie (September 3, 1877 – March 12, 1959) was an American orthodontist who attended Angle School of Orthodontia in St. Louis and graduated in 1900. He served as president of American Association of Orthodontists for two terms in 1904 and 1905. He also served as the president of the Chicago Association of Orthodontists. Lourie during formative years of the Orthodontics, played a role in critical analysis of papers talking about orthodontic techniques. He developed the high labial arch appliance. He also developed a wire-stretching pliers which was useful in cutting any leftover spurs on the labial arches.

== Life ==
He was born in Keokuk, Iowa in 1877. He graduated from Keokuk Dental College in 1899. He studies were interrupted in 1888 when he was called for service in Company A of 50th Regiment of the Iowa Infantry in the Spanish–American War. He enrolled in one of the first classes at Angle School of Orthodontia, having graduated from there in 1900. He then started teaching orthodontics at Keokuk Dental School and Angle School of Orthodontia. He then moved to Chicago, where he practiced orthodontics until he retired in 1938. After retirement he moved to Sanibel Island. He eventually moved to California and then to Peoria, Illinois, in 1958 to live with their son Lloyd S. Lourie Jr, who was a dentist in the city.

He was married to Caroline Lourie and had a son, Lloyd S. Lourie, and a daughter, Elmer Ryckart.

== Career ==
Lourie was presented at the first meeting of American Society of Orthodontists in 1901. During the meeting, he read a paper titled "Is orthodontia Represented by Its Techniques?". This paper was eventually published in the Dental Items of Interest in 1901.

He was a chartered member of American Association of Orthodontists. He served as president of the organization in 1904 and 1905 and was an honorary member in 1938 when he retired. He was a member of Delta Sigma Delta fraternity, Chicago Dental Society and American Dental Association. He was an honorary member of the Northwestern Dental Society.

In 1959, Lourie died due to a cerebral hemorrhage at the age of 81.
