= Copeland Shelden =

American orthodontist

F. Copeland Shelden (1907 – December 19, 1977) was an American orthodontist who was a graduate of the Angle School of Orthodontia. He played in important part in forming the Charles H. Tweed Foundation for research.

== Life ==
He was born in Kansas City, Missouri. His father was Frank Shelden, who was also an orthodontist and a graduate of the Angle School of Orthodontia. He attended Wentworth Military Academy and College followed by education at the University of Missouri–Kansas City School of Dentistry. He obtained his dental degree in 1931. He attended the Angle School of Orthodontia in Pasadena, California, before attending dental school.

He was a previous president of the Midwestern component of the Edward H. Angle Society and Charles H. Tweed Foundation. He was also a diplomate of the American Board of Orthodontics. During his life he served on the faculty of dental school departments at the Tufts University School of Dental Medicine, Washington University School of Dental Medicine, and University of Detroit Mercy School of Dentistry. He also served on the board of directors of the Western Golf Association and played an important role in founding the Evans Scholars Foundation Chapter at the University of Missouri in 1967 and the University of Kansas in 1975.
