= Archie B. Brusse =

American orthodontist

- Born: August 3, 1888
- Education: Denver University Dental School
- Known for: Founder of Rocky Mountain Orthodontics Company, Rocky Mountain Society of Orthodontists and Past President of American Society of Orthodontists
- Medical career
- Profession: Dentist
- Sub-specialties: orthodontics

Archie B. Brusse (1888–1959) was an American orthodontist who is known to be one of the founders of the Rocky Mountain Society of Orthodontists in 1921. He was also one of the founders of the Denver Summer Meeting for the Advanced Study of Orthodontics. Brusse also founded the Rocky Mountain Orthodontics Company.

== Life ==
He was one of the six sons of John and Jessie Elliott Brusse. Archie went to high school in Denver, Colorado, and attended Denver University Dental School in 1912. After obtaining his dental degree, he practiced dentistry for many years. He then started working under Dr. Albert H. Ketcham, who also practiced in Denver. Archie married Dana Martin in 1918. In 1921, he helped establish the Rocky Mountain Society of Orthodontists in 1921. In 1941, he became the president of the organization also. He was also one of the founders of the Denver Summer Meeting for the Advanced Study of Orthodontics.

== Awards and positions ==
- American Association of Orthodontists – President (1946)
- Denver Summer Meeting for the Advanced Study of Orthodontics – Founder
- Rocky Mountain Society of Orthodontists – Founder
