= Milo Hellman =

American orthodontist

Milo Hellman (March 26, 1872 – May 11, 1947) was an American orthodontist and an instructor at Angle School of Orthodontia and Chair of NYU Orthodontic Program. He is known for his contributions to the field of Orthodontia via his research on the relationship between teeth, jaws and face.

== Life ==
Hellman was born in Iași, Romania in 1872 and moved to United States at the age of 16. In his teen years he joined the Pittsburgh Symphony Orchestra where he played flute. He earned his dental degree from Pennsylvania College of Dental Surgery 1905. He then started teaching at NYU Dental School and he also became a research associate in Physical Anthropology at the American Museum of Natural History. He studied how race affected characteristics of teeth and he also studied how evolution changed teeth, jaws and faces.

== Career ==
During his teaching career at Angle School of Orthodontia, Hellman worked with Edward Angle, Raymond C. Osburn and learned about the relationship between teeth, jaws and face. Hellman wrote over 100 articles which have been published in various journals. Notably, together with William King Gregory he studied the very first fossils of Australopithecus africanus and in their 1939 report established the dryopithecines as a distinct taxonomic group for the ancient great apes which expanded out of Africa into Europe about 10 million years before ancestral humans did, but eventually became extinct again. Hellman was also a member of American Association of Mammalogists, American Association of Physical Anthropologists, American Ethnological Society, and a chartered member of the Society of Vertebrate Paleontology, the Society for the Study of Evolution, and the Society for the Study of Child Development.

He also participated in the Committee on Growth and Development, along with Edward Angle, during a Child Health and Protection Conference at White House in 1930. He also served as the vice-president of New York Academcy Sciences from 1932 to 1933. In addition he served on the editorial board of Journal of Dental Research, Archives of Clinical and Oral Pathology, and Bulletin of the First District Dental Society, New York. He was awarded an Honorary degree of Doctor from University of Pennsylvania and University of Witwatersrand in 1933 and 1938 respectively.

He also served as the Chair of Orthodontics of NYU Orthodontic Program. American Association of Orthodontists established the Milo Hellman Research Award in 1958 to honour Hellman's contributions to the field of Orthodontics.

== Awards ==
- Albert H. Ketcham Memorial Award
