= Frank M. Casto =

American orthodontist

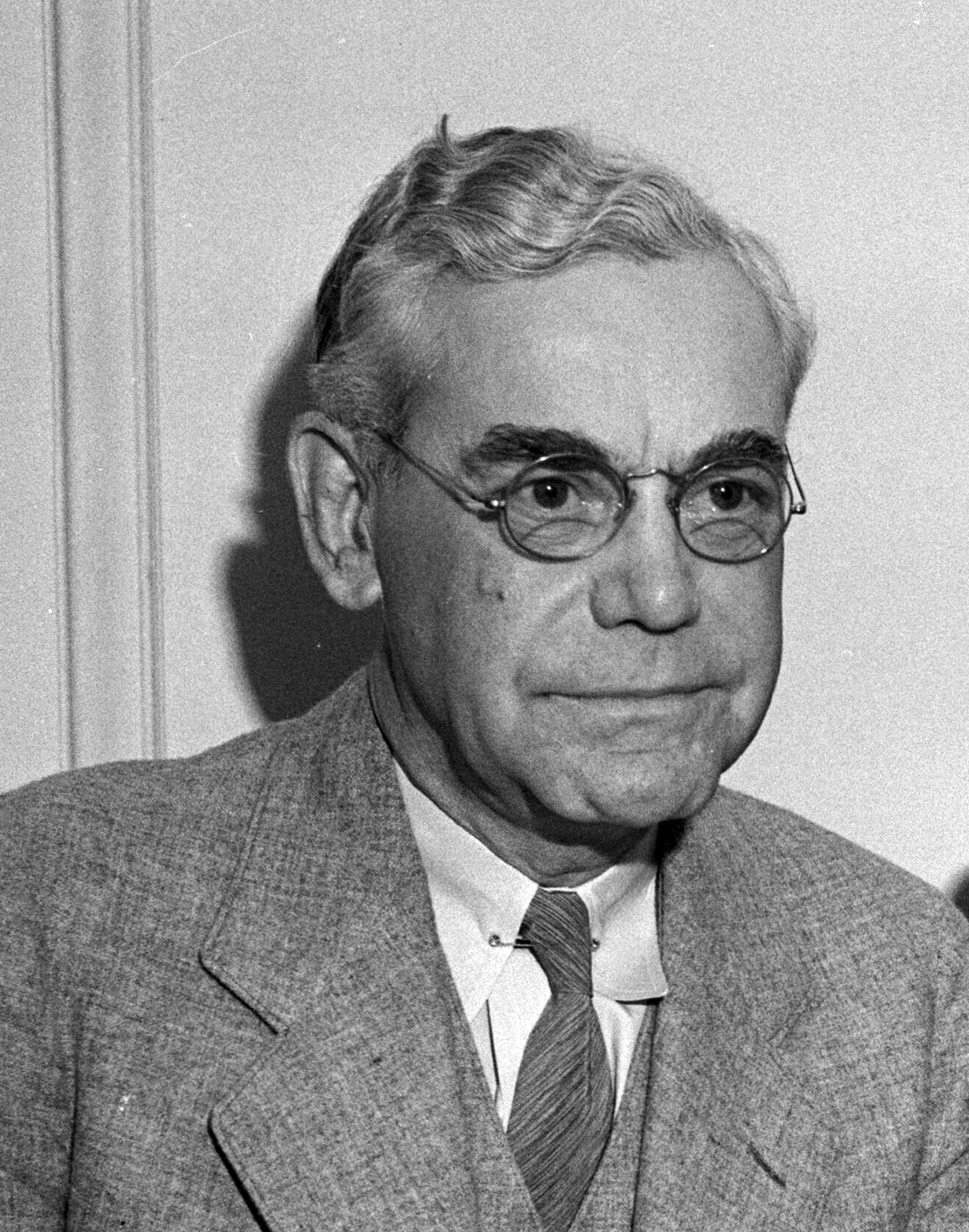
Casto in 1935

Frank M. Casto (30 May 1875 – 25 April 1965) was an American orthodontist who attended Angle School of Orthodontia in 1902. He was the President of the American Association of Orthodontists in 1909 and the American Dental Association in 1935.

== Life ==
Casto was born in Blanchester, Ohio. He obtained his dental degree in 1898 from Ohio State University College of Dentistry. In 1900 he received his medical degree and thereafter his pharmacy degree in 1902 from Ohio State University College of Medicine and Pharmacy School respectively. He then became a professor until 1904 at the school. He also served as the dean of the School of Dentistry at Western Reserve University from 1917 to 1937. The annual AAO meeting of 1909 was held at his home in Cleveland, Ohio. He has served as president of numerous organizations such as Cleveland Dental Association, the Northern Ohio Dental Association, the Ohio State Dental Association, and the American Dental Association (1935–1936). In addition, he served as the past vice-president of the Pan American Orthodontic Association and was Supreme Grand Master of the Delta Sigma Delta dental fraternity in 1928.

== Career ==
He moved to La Jolla, California in 1937 and practiced Orthodontics there until the time of his retirement in 1952. Casto held the reserve commission in the United States Navy and was also an active member of the La Jolla Post of the American Legion and Military Order of World Wars.

Casto along with Dr. McCoy played an important role in the functioning of the organization American Association of Orthodontists in its first 10 years of existence.

Casto was married to Florence M. Andrus on 20 February 1902, and had three children, William, Ruth, and Florence
