= American Board of Orthodontics =

Association of orthodontics

- Abbreviation: ABO
- Formation: 1934
- Type: Certification body
- Headquarters: St. Louis, USA
- Location: United States
- Official language: English
- Website: www.americanboardortho.com

American Board of Orthodontics (ABO) is a non-profit professional association for orthodontists founded in 1929.

== History ==
The organization was first established as the American Board of Orthodontia in 1929 and later changed its name to the American Board of Orthodontics in 1938. The board was established by the American Association of Orthodontists in Estes Park, Colorado. Albert Ketcham Award was established by the organization in 1935 to give the highest recognition to an individual in Orthodontics. In 1950, American Dental Association recognized ABO as the official certifying agency of the specialty of Orthodontics in the United States. Charles H. Tweed was the first certified orthodontist in the United States and Martin Dewey was the first Editor-in-Chief of the American Journal of Orthodontics and Dentofacial Orthopedics.

In 1950, ABO required graduates from residencies of orthodontics to present 15 cases and a thesis to get board certified. In 1964, a written examination was implemented by the ABO. In 1978, the association discontinued the thesis requirement from the graduates. In 2011, a New Examination Center opened in St. Louis for ABO Clinical Examinations for graduates.

== Mission ==
The mission of The American Board of Orthodontics is to elevate the quality of orthodontic care for the public by promoting excellence through certification, education, and professional collaboration. The society also confers awards every year which are presented to individuals who have made significant contributions to the field of orthodontics.
