= The Angle Orthodontist =

- Discipline: Orthodontics
- Language: English
- Edited by: Steven J. Lindauer

Publication details
- History: 1931–present
- Publisher: E. H. Angle Education and Research Foundation (United States)
- Frequency: Bimonthly
- Open access: Yes
- Impact factor: 1.225 (2014)

Standard abbreviations
- ISO 4: Angle Orthod.

Indexing
- CODEN: ANORAA
- ISSN: 0003-3219 (print); 1945-7103 (web)
- OCLC no.: 1481145

Links
- Journal homepage; Online access; Online archive

The Angle Orthodontist is a bimonthly peer-reviewed medical journal covering orthodontics that is published by the E. H. Angle Education and Research Foundation and is the official journal of the Edward H. Angle Society of Orthodontia. The editor-in-chief is Steven J. Lindauer (Virginia Commonwealth University). According to the Journal Citation Reports, the journal has a 2014 impact factor of 1.225.

== History ==
The journal was first formed in 1930 where Mrs. Angle became the first Editor-in-Chief and Dr. Frank A. Gough was the first Business Manager. The society was formed by the members of the Edward H. Angle Society of Orthodontia at their meeting in Chicago in 1930. Dr. Allan G. Brodie presented the first scientific paper of this journal. For the first 17 years, this was the only journal devoted strictly to orthodontia because American Journal of Orthodontics and Dentofacial Orthopedics journal was formerly known as American Journal of Orthodontia and Oral Surgery until 1948.

== Editor-in-Chief: Past and Present ==
- Robert H. W. Strang, 1930 - 1936
- Dean Harold Noyes 1936 - 1947
- Wendell L. Wylie, 1947 - 1952
- Arthur B. Lewis, Morse Newcomb 1952 - 1980
- Raymond C. Thurow, 1981 - 1988
- David L. Turpin, 1989 - 1999
- Robert J. Isaacson, 2000 – 2012
- Steven J. Lindauer 2012–Present
