= Canadian Association of Orthodontists =

The Canadian Association of Orthodontists (CAO; French: Association canadienne des orthodontistes, ACO), founded in 1949, is the Canadian national organization of educationally qualified orthodontic specialists. It is headquartered in Markham, Ontario.

The association is dedicated to the advancement or orthodontics and the promotion of quality orthodontic care in Canada. The CAO advances the science and art of orthodontics, works for higher standards of excellence in the practice of orthodontics, protects the rights of its members as certified specialists in orthodontics, and fosters public awareness of the benefits of orthodontic health care provided by certified specialists in orthodontics. The association has four classes of members:

1. Active members: Individuals who are registered as orthodontic specialists with a dental regulatory authority in Canada.
2. Student members: Graduate and post-graduate students who provide evidence of active enrollment in an approved graduate-level program.
3. Academic members: Individuals who have completed a university-level program in orthodontics and are employed full-time in an accredited university orthodontic program.
4. Life-Active members: Active or academic members who have maintained their membership in the Association for 40 consecutive years. Orthodontists are dental specialists in the diagnosis, prevention, and treatment of orthodontic problems. They have completed a minimum of two academic years of study in an accredited orthodontic residency program. Only dentists who have successfully completed this specialized training are allowed to use the title "orthodontist," and membership in the Canadian Association of Orthodontists is limited to orthodontic specialists. The CAO is affiliated with the American Association of Orthodontists.
