= Raymond Begg =

Australian orthodontist (1898–1983)

- Born: Percival Raymond Begg; 10 October 1898; Coolgardie, Australia.
- Died: 18 January 1983 (aged 84); Glen Osmond, South Australia
- Education: University of Adelaide, Angle School of Orthodontia
- Known for: Developed Australian orthodontic wire and light wire technique with differential forces
- Medical career
- Profession: Dentist
- Sub-specialties: Orthodontics

Percival Raymond Begg AO (10 October 1898 – 18 January 1983) was a professor at the University of Adelaide School of Dentistry and a well known orthodontist, famous for developing the "Begg technique". Permanent displays dedicated to the Begg technique can be found in the Smithsonian Institution in Washington DC, the Library of the American Dental Association in Chicago, and the PR Begg Museum at the University of Adelaide.

== Education ==
Begg was born in Coolgardie, Australia. His father was an accountant and his mother was a business manager. He grew up working at a cattle and sheep farm in South Australia. He and his family moved to Adelaide in 1900, where he was enrolled in Pulteney Grammar School. He attended St. Peter's College where he was a classmate of Howard Florey. He received his science degree from the University of Melbourne in 1923.

Before he left for the US, Begg at one point drew a sketch of the aboriginal people of Australia and noticed that their incisors were completely worn down. A striking fact he observed was that these aboriginal people had no caries or periodontal disease in their teeth.

Begg decided to enroll in Angle School of Orthodontia in Pasadena, California in 1924. During his stay in California, Edward Angle was developing his Edgewise Appliance after working on the Ribbon arch appliance. Begg and Fred Ishii of Japan were the first to treat patients with the edgewise appliance at Angle School of Orthodontia.

In 1925, Begg sailed back to Australia to work with orthodontics on his own patients in Adelaide, South Australia. He also took up a position as a professor at the University of Adelaide. He eventually retired from this position in 1964.

Begg initially experimented with Edward Angle's non-extraction therapy but without much success. He observed a lot of relapse and treatment results with which he and his patients were not happy. In 1928, he decided to start removing teeth and starting seeing better dental aesthetics in his patients.

When he came back from the US, Begg was using a rectangular wire like Angle. However, he made a switch to the round archwire in 1928 and started using that with his brackets. In 1933, he usedribbon arch brackets and round arch wires with lighter forces in an orthodontic treatment. He is known to have developed the "Australian orthodontic wires" in the 1940s when he worked with a metallurgist named Arthur J. Wilcock.

Begg married in 1928 and eventually had three children.

== Begg technique ==
The Begg technique consists of three stages. The first involves multiple steps such as opening anterior bite, closing anterior spaces, eliminate anterior crowding, correction of rotations, and over-correction of mesio-distal relationship of buccal segments. This technique employs bite opening bends such as the gable bend or anchor bend along with the use of class II elastics. The bite opening bends will produce the intrusion of the frontal incisors either through the translation movement or rotation (tipping) movement. The rotational movement leads to flaring of the teeth as a side effect, which can be controlled by class II elastics preventing the flaring of upper anterior teeth.

The second stage involves closing the extraction spaces. Begg mentioned that it was important to maintain the corrections achieved in Stage I while working on Stage II. The third stage of the Begg technique involves the root correction in the labio-lingual direction or mesio-distal direction.

Harold Kesling and George Dishham, American orthodontists, introduced the Begg technique to many orthodontists in the United States in the late 1950s and 1960s. In 1959, Dr. Kesling and Dr. Rocke invited over 150 orthodontists to assess the results of over 100 cases which were treated by Kesling and others with the Begg technique. Kesling is known for popularizing the technique in the United States.

== Death ==
Dr. Begg retired in 1980. On 18 January 1983 he died at Glen Osmond and was cremated.

== Awards and recognitions ==
- Became Officer of the Order of Australia in 1981
- First Australian to be inducted into the Hall of Fame at the Paris-based Pierre Fauchard Academy
- Founding member of the Australian Society of Orthodontists in 1927
- Albert H. Ketcham Memorial Award Recipient by AAO in 1977
- Fellow of the Royal Australian College of Dental Surgeons

There is a plaque in his honour on the Jubilee 150 Walkway, at the Adelaide Dental Hospital.

== See also ==
- Orthodontics
- Melbourne Faculty of Dentistry
- Orthodontic technology
