= Albin Oppenheim =

American orthodontist

- Born: January 8, 1875; Brno, Moravia.
- Died: November 29, 1945 (aged 70)
- Education: Berlin Dental policlinic
- Known for: Contribution to understanding of biology of tooth movement
- Medical career
- Profession: Dentist
- Institutions: University of Vienna
- Sub-specialties: Orthodontics

Albin Oppenheim (January 8, 1875 – November 20, 1945) was an American orthodontist who contributed significantly to the understanding of orthodontics about the biology of tooth movement.

== Life ==
Oppenheim was born in Brno, Moravia, and received an education in that part of Austria-Hungary. He went to Karl Ferdinand's University, Prague in 1899 to earn his Medical Degree. He then went to Berlin Dentalpoliclinic to earn his Dental Degree in 1904. He then practiced with Dr. Weiser in Vienna at his practice until 1914. During World War I, he served as head of Army Hospital and in 1915 was appointed Privatdozent on Head of Orthodontics Department at University of Vienna. In 1938, Oppenheim went to Geneva, Switzerland because of the political tensions of World War II. He moved to the US in 1939 after getting an appointment as a faculty at University of Southern California.

His introduction to Edward Angle happened when he gave lectures at Angle School of Orthodontia when it was in New London, Connecticut. After spending some time in US, Dr. Oppenheim along with Grunberg went back to Europe and brought back teachings of Angle to several institutions.

== Career ==
One of his articles Tissue Changes, Particularly of the Bone, Incident to Tooth Movement was published in Angel Orthodontist in 1911. In this publication, Dr. Oppenheim showed the movement of teeth happens due to complete reorganization of the involved bone tissue. He also showed that pull that happens from ligatures on a heavy base wire acts like a lever instead of a post in the ground. In subsequent publications later on, Dr. Oppenheim proposed that using gentle forces with long intervals of rest between had many advantages in Orthodontics.

Oppenheim died in Hollywood, California, on November 20, 1945.
