= New York University College of Dentistry =

Dentistry school in New York City, New York, US

Coordinates: 40.7378°N 73.97841°W

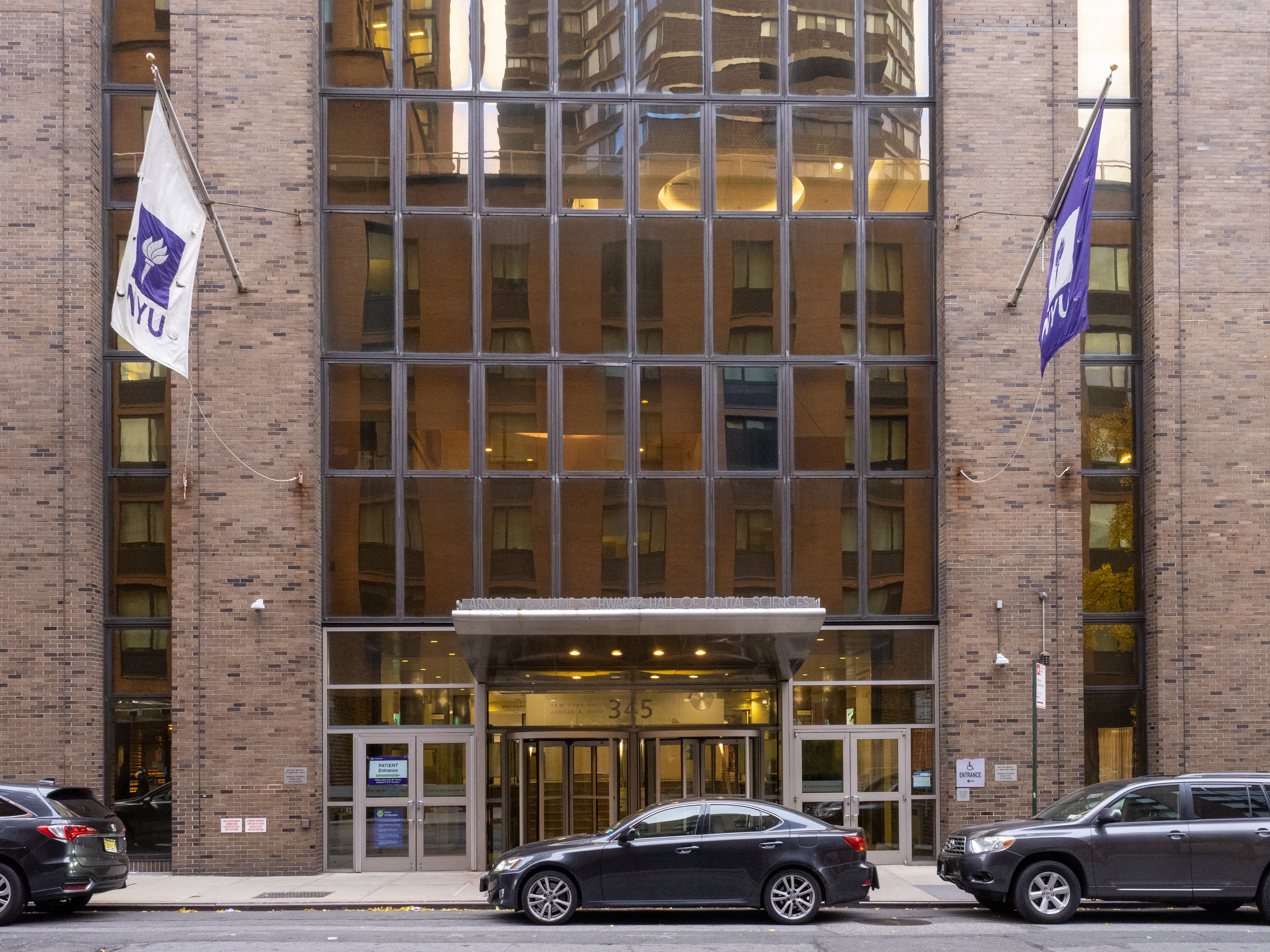
- Type: Private
- Established: 1865
- Parent institution: New York University
- Postgraduates: 1800
- Location: New York City, New York, U.S.
- Website: dental.nyu.edu

The New York University College of Dentistry is the dentistry school of New York University. As the third oldest dentistry school in the United States, it offers both graduate programs and clinical training in oral healthcare.

== History ==
The College of Dentistry was founded in 1865 as the "New York College of Dentistry." It merged with NYU in 1925. NYU Dentistry is the third oldest continuously operating and the largest dental school in the United States. In 1957, the College moved into its present home on First Avenue, which in 1965 was named the K. B. Weissman Clinical Science Building. In 1978, the Arnold and Marie Schwartz Hall of Dental Sciences was completed. In 1987, New York University dedicated the David B. Kriser Dental Center. In 2002, the Leonard I. Bluestone Center for Clinical Research opened—the only dental school-based research center that provides beds for 24-hour patient monitoring. In fall of 2005, NYU's Division of Nursing moved from the Steinhardt School of Education to form the College of Nursing within the College of Dentistry. In 2015, a new joint 170,000 square foot building for Dentistry, Nursing, and the Bioengineering Institute was opened. In aggregate, the College of Dentistry occupies 27 floors distributed among five buildings.

== Facilities ==
The College of Dentistry is located on First Avenue between East 24th and 26th Streets, about 6 blocks south of the NYU School of Medicine. The College's facilities include the Schwartz Hall of Dental Sciences, the K. B. Weissman Clinical Science Building, the new 13 floor interdisciplinary building at 433 First Avenue, four newly renovated floors at 137 East 25th Street, and one floor at 380 First Avenue. These house classrooms, patient clinics, research and teaching facilities, and administrative offices, as well as a state-of-the-art Learning Commons for dentistry, dental hygiene, nursing, and engineering students and an Executive Conference Suite. Clinical facilities include 506 dental operatories. The operatories are designed in modules, each containing a waiting room, offices, X-ray facilities, and a seminar room for instruction and consultation. These facilities enable the College to provide oral health care for thousands of New Yorkers.

== Library ==
The College of Dentistry maintains one of the largest rare book dental libraries, close to 1000 volumes, the legacy of Dr. Bernhard Wolf Weinberger, a dental historian, orthodontist and a faculty member in the 1930s. Its collection includes a first edition of the Pierre Fauchard Le Chirurgien Dentist (1728), one second edition (1746) and a third edition (1786). Other volumes include works by Bartolomeo Eustachio, 1563 edition of De Libellus de Dentibus, 1546 and 1547 editions of Artzneybuch (The Little Medicinal Book for All Kinds of Diseases and Infirmities of the Teeth), one of the first German dentally-related book. The original library, founded in 1909 and named the Waldmann Memorial Library in 1978 was digitized and modernized in 2015. The College of Dentistry has moved its "library" into the newly opened Dental-Nursing-Biomaterials joint interprofessional building at 433 First Avenue. The building has a large study area for all students but it no longer houses books. The students have 24 hour access to the study area.

== E-Curriculum ==
Since 2001, NYU Dentistry has replaced traditional textbooks with a collection of digitalized textbooks. All required materials are available to students through a computer-enhanced curriculum. The new technology gives each student a license for all of the textbooks in the curriculum. In addition to traditional textbook content, students are able to view slide presentations and video streams of lab and clinical procedures and do full text searches on their materials.

== Notable faculty ==
- Milo Hellman, American orthodontist
- Norman William Kingsley—first dean of New York College of Dentistry, 1865–1869, Father of orthodontics
- Robert Ledley—inventor of the whole body CT scanner
- Martha Sommerman—director of NIDCR (2011–present)

== Notable alumni ==
- Daniel Bukantz (1917–2008), Olympic fencer
- Frank A. Gough, orthodontist
- Irwin Smigel, dentist

== See also ==
- American Student Dental Association
