= Dean Harold Noyes =

American orthodontist

Harold Judd Noyes (1898–1968), often called "Dean Noyes", was an American orthodontist who graduated from Angle School of Orthodontia. He was the Chairman of the Orthodontic Department of the Northwestern University Dental School. He also served as the Dean of University of Oregon Dental School.

== Life ==
He was the son of Frederick Bogue Noyes and grandson of Edmund Noyes, who both served as deans of American dental schools. He received his college degree from Beloit College. He received his dental degree in 1928 from University of Illinois College of Dentistry and received his medical degree in 1933 from Rush Medical School. His education was interrupted because of World War I in 1917 and 1919. He was married to Elizabeth Noyes and had a daughter, Loren N. Bates.

== Career ==
In his professional career, Dr. Noyes served as a pediatrician at Presbyterian Hospital, Children's Memorial in Chicago. He served as a consultant to Zoller Memorial Dental Clinic in Chicago in 1940. He was the Chairman of the Orthodontic Department of the Northwestern University Dental School from 1940 to 1946. He then served as the Dean of University of Oregon Dental School from 1946 until his death in 1967.

While being Dean at Oregon Health & Science University School of Dentistry, Dr. Noyes introduced the "Vertical Curriculum" for dental students. He allowed first-year dental students to construct full dentures and participate in exercise of tooth morphology. This made a profound impact in dental education, as this curriculum was widely accepted and implemented in other dental schools.

He also co-authored a textbook with his father, Oral Histology and Embryology with Laboratory Directions.

== Positions held ==
- American Association of Dental Schools, President, 1955
- American Dental Association, Chairman of Section on Research, 1940
- Council of Dental Education, member, 1960–1964
- American Fund for Dental Education, Director, 1956–1966.
- The Angle Orthodontist, Chief Editor, 1936–1947, 1936–1947
