= Malcolm Moos Health Sciences Tower =

Building on the University of Minnesota campus in Minneapolis, Minnesota

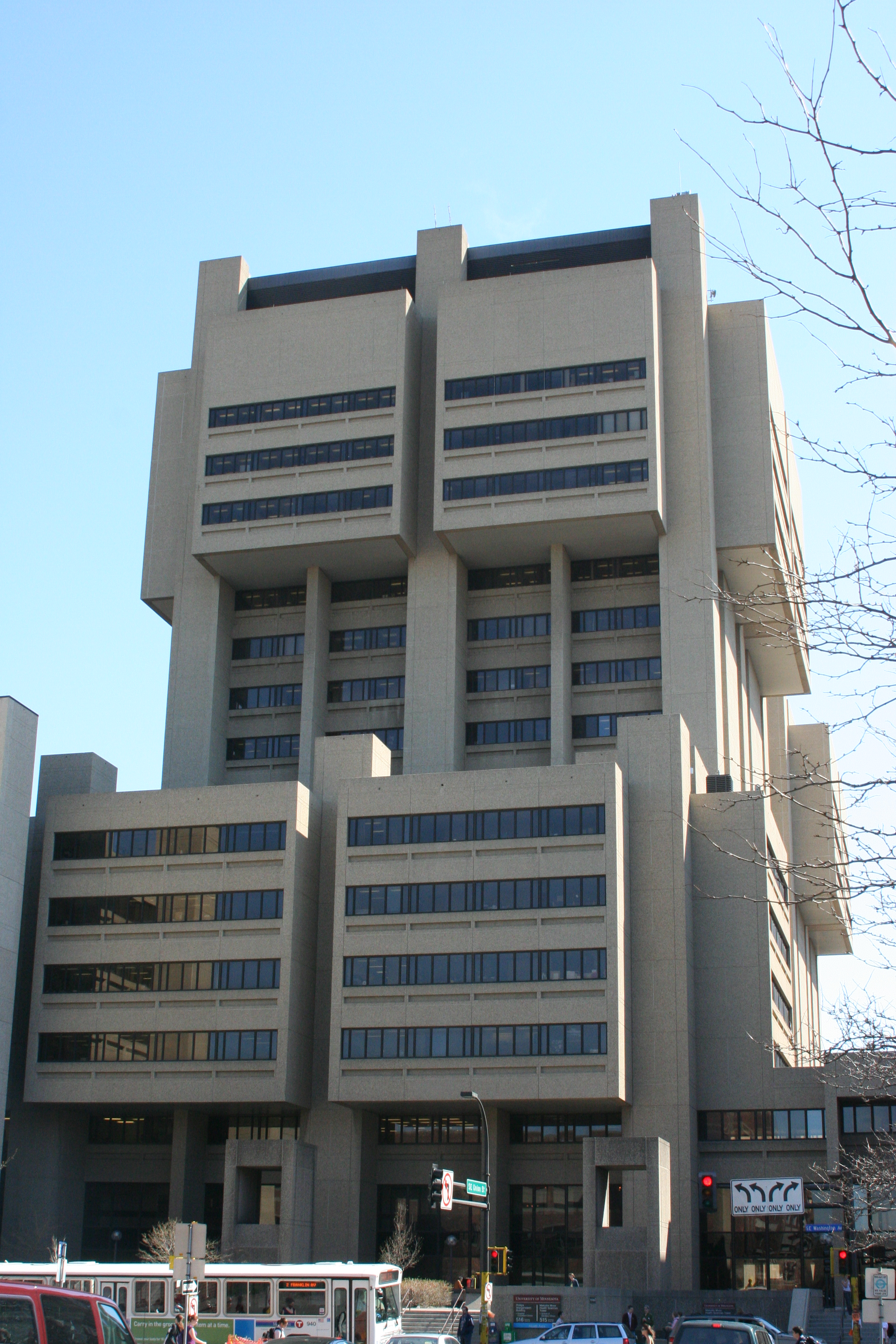
- Moos Tower in 2005
- Interactive map of the Malcolm Moos Health Sciences Tower area

General information
- Architectural style: Brutalist
- Location: Minneapolis, Minnesota, 515 Delaware Street SE, United States
- Coordinates: 44.9733°N 93.2314°W
- Elevation: 260 meters
- Groundbreaking: 1971
- Completed: 1974
- Owner: University of Minnesota

Height
- Height: 80 meters

Technical details
- Floor count: 19

Malcolm Moos Health Sciences Tower, informally known as Moos Tower, is a building on the East Bank of the University of Minnesota campus in Minneapolis, Minnesota. Inside Moos Tower are labs and faculty offices for the College of Dentistry and a Caribou Coffee with a designated study lounge. The entrance of Biomedical library can also be found in the building.

Moos Tower is the tallest building on the University of Minnesota Twin Cities campus and is an example of Brutalist architecture. The building is often theorized to have been built to resemble a tooth, due to the College of Dentistry's presence inside.

== History ==
The tower was the first realized component of the University of Minnesota's 1970s Health Sciences Complex plan, with a 1971 groundbreaking and a completion date in 1973. The building was originally named Health Sciences Unit A before being renamed in 1983 for Malcolm Moos, president of the University from 1967 to 1974. Moos Tower was designed by The Architects Collaborative as well as Cerny and Associates, HGA, and Setter Leach and Lindstrom.
