= Frederick Bogue Noyes =

American dentist

- Born: 1872; Onarga, Illinois
- Died: 1961 (aged 88–89)
- Education: Northwestern University Dental School
- Occupations: Dentist, Professor at University of Illinois at Chicago College of Dentistry

Frederick Bogue Noyes (1872–1961) was an American dentist. His dental career began before the age of ten when he worked as an assistant to his dentist father. Noyes began dental practice before entering dental school (legal at the time), and while a student at Northwestern University Dental School, organized the first course on dental pathology in the United States, and began a long association providing illustrations for the texts of G. V. Black.

In 1908, he started a new career as an orthodontist after studying with Edward Angle. Noyes joined the University of Illinois at Chicago College of Dentistry as professor and head of the Department of Dental Histology in 1913 and became dean of the College in 1924. He was known for his willingness to experiment with change and innovation in the curriculum. Noyes served as dean of the College until 1940.

Preceded by Frederick B. Moorehead	Deans of the University of Illinois at Chicago College of Dentistry; 1924-1940	Succeeded by Howard M. Marjerison
