= University of Minnesota School of Dentistry =

Dental school in Minneapolis, Minnesota, US

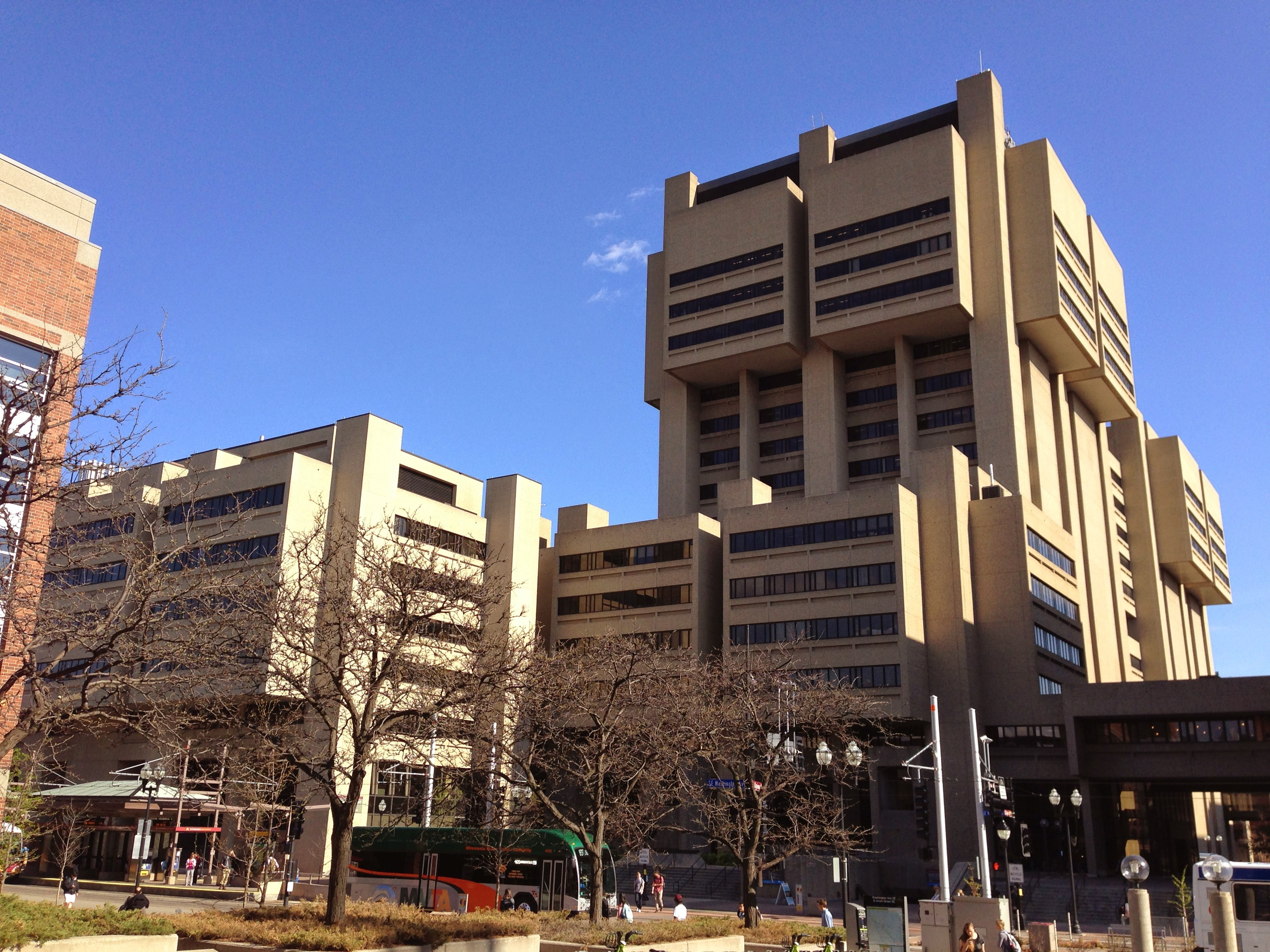
- Moos Health Science Tower, the location of the School of Dentistry, on the University of Minnesota's East Bank campus
- Type: Public dental school
- Parent institution: University of Minnesota
- Dean: Keith A. Mays, DDS, MS, PhD
- Location: Minneapolis, Minnesota, U.S. 44°58′22.92″N 93°13′54.01″W
- Campus: Urban
- Website: www.dentistry.umn.edu

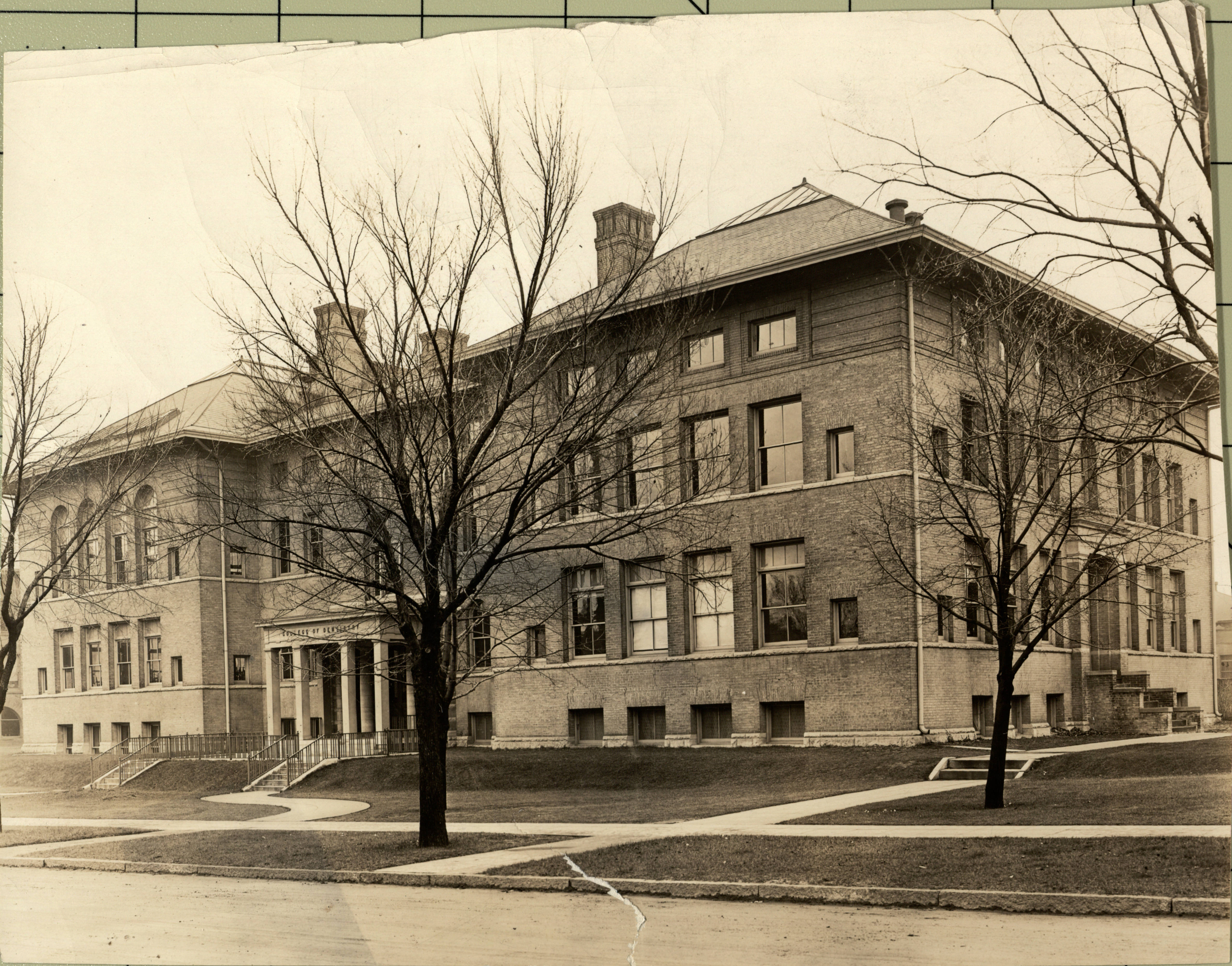
College of Dentistry at the University of Minnesota (1926)

The University of Minnesota School of Dentistry is the dental school of the University of Minnesota. It is located in Minneapolis, Minnesota, United States.

== History ==
The University of Minnesota was established in 1851, and it took over the Minnesota College Hospital in 1888 in order to establish its own department of medicine. Its dental school, originally a part of that department, was separated off in 1892, and in 1932 it took the name of the School of Dentistry.

Previously a three-year degree, the dental program was extended to four years by 1938. Additional programs were added, including two-year and bachelor's degrees in dental hygiene in 1920 and 1990, respectively, and a graduate degree program in 1937.

== The School of Dentistry today ==
Today, the school is a part of the University Academic Health Center, which also includes the Medical School, College of Pharmacy, School of Nursing, and School of Public Health. As part of the Center, one of the most comprehensive education and research facilities for health professionals in the nation, students and faculty reap the unique benefits of being part of an exceptionally broad range of professional health education, research and treatment efforts. The school is primarily located in the Malcolm Moos Health Sciences Tower in the "Health" area of the East Bank section of the campus in Minneapolis.

The School of Dentistry is the only dental school in the state accredited to teach dentistry procedures, and the only dental school between Milwaukee, Wisconsin, and Seattle, Washington. It is the only oral-hygiene program in Minnesota that grants a bachelor's degree and is affiliated with a dental school (24 students per class).

Students pursuing advanced training can choose 13 clinical-specialty or special-focus areas. It is accredited to educate dental hygienists and dental specialists in areas such as endodontics, oral and maxillofacial surgery, orthodontics, pediatric dentistry, periodontics, and prosthodontics. Further, the school offers many options for general dentists, specialists and dental hygienists pursuing academic, research and administrative careers, master's and Ph.D. degree programs in conjunction with the University's Graduate School.

== Notable alumni ==
- Herbert A. Pullen

== See also ==
- American Student Dental Association
