= University of Detroit Mercy School of Dentistry =

Dental school in Detroit, Michigan, US

- Type: Private university
- Established: 1932
- Dean: Dr. Mert N. Aksu
- Location: 2700 Martin Luther King Jr Blvd, Detroit, MI 48208, USA., Detroit, MI, U.S. 42.3379°N 83.0864°W
- Website: dental.udmercy.edu

The University of Detroit Mercy School of Dentistry is the dental school of the University of Detroit Mercy. It is located in the city of Detroit, Michigan, United States. It is one of two dental schools in the state of Michigan.

== History ==
University of Detroit Mercy School of Dentistry is a part of University of Detroit Mercy. The school was established in 1932 and graduated its first class in 1935. It was originally located in the path of what became the Chrysler Freeway and moved in 1963 to East Jefferson Avenue, one mile east of the core of Detroit. In 1997, the School relocated into a new teaching and patient care facility on the University of Detroit Mercy's Outer Drive Campus. In January 2008, the School relocated to the Corktown Campus. The new facility comprises two four-story buildings containing 190 clinical operatories, classrooms, and a simulation laboratory with a seating capacity of 100. The dental hygiene program was initiated in 1950, the postdoctoral endodontic program in 1959, and the postdoctoral orthodontic program in 1963. In 2004, advanced education programs in general dentistry and periodontics were initiated.

In 1981, a 42-chair clinic was opened in the University Health Center at Detroit Receiving Hospital in the Detroit Medical Center complex.

== Academics ==
University of Detroit Mercy School of Dentistry awards following degrees:

- Bachelor of Science in Dental Hygiene
- Doctor of Dental Surgery
- Master of Science (Post-doctoral):
  - Endodontics
  - Periodontics
  - Orthodontics

== Departments ==
University of Detroit Mercy School of Dentistry includes the following departments:

- Biomedical & Diagnostic Sciences
- Endodontics
- Oral & Maxillofacial Surgery
- Orthodontics
- Patient Management
- Pediatric
- Periodontology & Dental Hygiene
- Restorative Dentistry

== Accreditation ==
University of Detroit Mercy School of Dentistry is currently accredited by ADA.

== See also ==
- American Student Dental Association
