= Martin Dewey =

American orthodontist

Dr. Martin Dewey (1881–1933) was an American orthodontist and a past president of the American Association of Orthodontists and the American Dental Association. Dewey represented the "New School" of Edward Angle in the great Extraction Debate of 1911 held in New York City.

== Life ==
He was born in 1881 in Kingman, Kansas. In 1899, he obtained his college degree from Wichita Normal School. He then enrolled in University of Iowa College of Dentistry. After graduation from dental school in 1902, he studied under Edward Angle at the Angle School of Orthodontia in St. Louis. After completing the school, Dewey started teaching at the school as a faculty. During his time in teaching, he also obtained an M.D. degree in St. Louis. He eventually practiced as a private orthodontist in Kansas City. There he became faculty at University of Missouri–Kansas City School of Dentistry. As a faculty he gained recognition as a teacher, debater and a writer on subjects pertaining to dentistry. Dewey eventually became a well-regarded public speaker.

== Career ==
Dr. Dewey was the founding editor of International Journal of Orthodontia, later known as American Journal of Orthodontics and Dentofacial Orthopedics. He worked with Dr. C.V. Mosby to establish the journal in 1915. He served as editor for 17 years and wrote many interesting articles over his lifetime. His efforts were important in establishing the journal in its early years. Before his death, Dr. Dewey began publishing a journal called Orthodontic Review which was designed as an open forum journal to discuss orthodontic related topics. The journal was however discontinued later. He played an important part in opposing the "Arizona Orthodontic Law.

Dewey established the Dewey School of Orthodontics at the Dental School in Kansas City, Missouri. The first classes were given in the summer of 1911 for a period of ten weeks. The school was moved to Chicago in 1917 and then to New York City two years later. He served as faculty member at both Chicago and New York dental schools. The school had annual orthodontic sessions until 1933 when Dewey died.

Dewey wrote and co-authored several textbooks such as Practical Orthodontics and Dental Anatomy. He was the co-author of Comparative Dental Anatomy textbook. There's also a Martin E. Dewey Award that has been established by the Southwestern Society of Orthodontists in his honor.

== Dewey School of Orthodontia alumni ==
- John W. Parsons
- Swinton Abelson

== Positions ==
- American Association of Orthodontists, president
- American Dental Association, president, 1931-1932
- American Board of Orthodontics, founding board member, 1929
- American Journal of Orthodontics & Dentofacial Orthopedics, founding editor, 1915-1933
- Southwestern Society of Orthodontists, honorary member
