= University of Maryland School of Dentistry =

Dental school in Baltimore, Maryland, US

University of Maryland School of Dentistry (Baltimore College of Dental Surgery)
- Type: Public
- Established: June 2, 1840; 186 years ago
- Parent institution: University of Maryland, Baltimore
- Dean: Mark A. Reynolds, DDS, PhD
- Location: Baltimore, MD, U.S. 39°17′22″N 76°37′31″W
- Website: dental.umaryland.edu

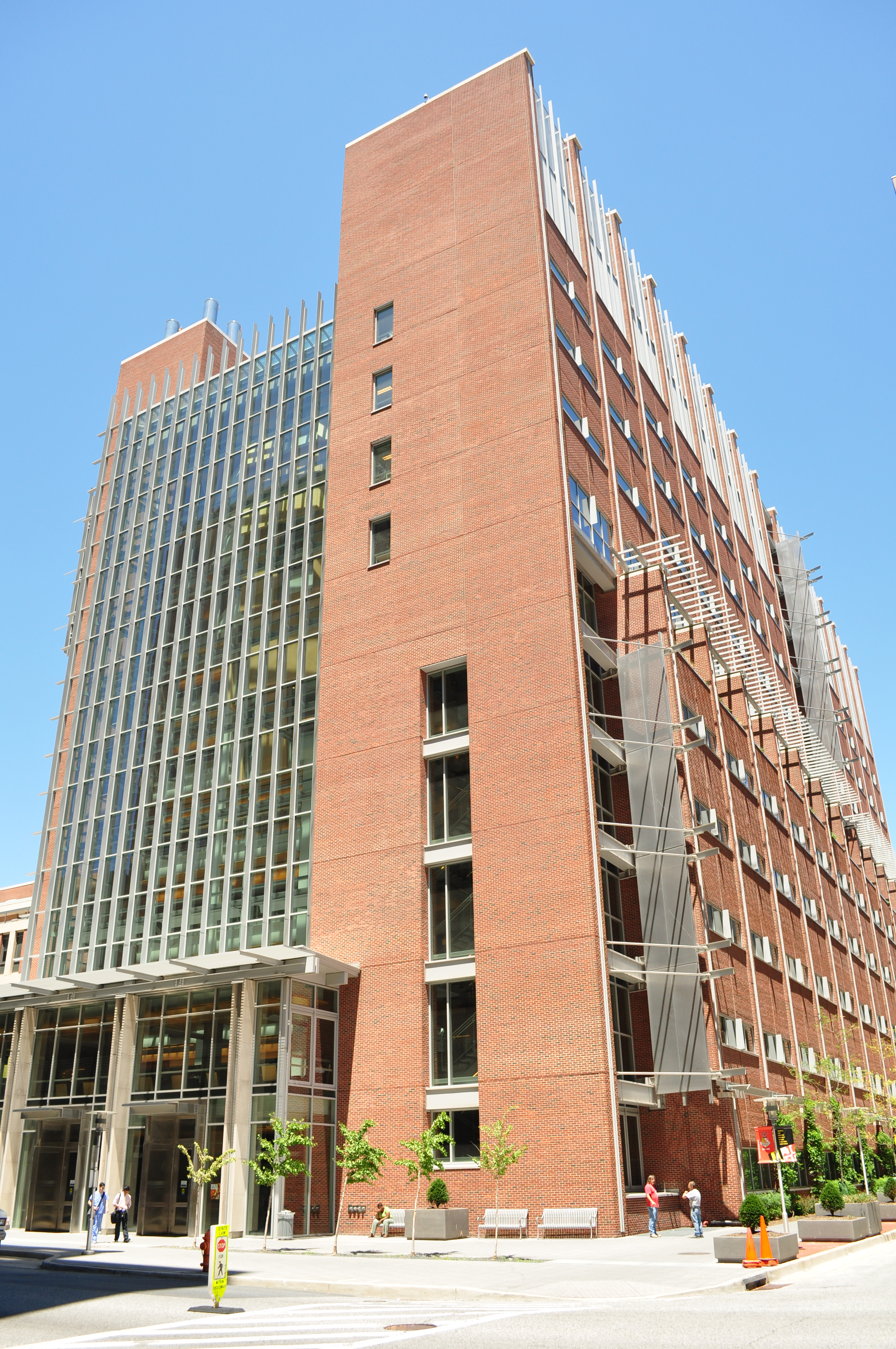
The University of Maryland School of Dentistry

The University of Maryland School of Dentistry (abbreviated UMSOD), is the dental school of the University System of Maryland. It was founded as an independent institution, the Baltimore College of Dental Surgery, in 1840 and was the birthplace of the Doctor of Dental Surgery (D.D.S.) degree. It is known as the first dental college in the world. It is headquartered at the University of Maryland, Baltimore campus. It is the only dental school in Maryland.

== History ==
Related history: Harvard School of Dental Medicine > History

The Baltimore College of Dental Surgery (BCDS) was chartered by an act of the General Assembly of Maryland (state legislature) in 1840. Its co-founders, Doctors Horace H. Hayden and Chapin A. Harris have been both inducted in the Pierre Fauchard Academy Hall of Fame. Dr. Harris was the school's first dean and a professor of practical dentistry. Following the death of Dr. Hayden on January 25, 1844, he became the school's second president. The College is still in existence today and is part of the University of Maryland, Baltimore as one of its five professional graduate level schools.

The establishment of the Baltimore College of Dental Surgery is seen as one of the three crucial steps in the foundation of the dental profession in the United States and the world.

A true profession is built upon a tripod: a formal organization, formal professional education, and a formal scientific literature. The United States was the leader in all three. In 1839-1840, the American Society of Dental Surgeons was organized, the Baltimore College of Dental Surgery was established, and the first dental journal in the world, the American Journal of Dental Science, was founded. At that time there were only about three hundred trained and scientific dentists in the entire country; the rest were relatively untrained operators, outright quacks, or charlatans. In 1898, a list of the first subscribers to the first journal was discovered and published by G.V. Black. These initial subscribers may be considered the core group of truly professional American dentists. They became the leaders of the newly born profession of dentistry.

Today, the University of Maryland School of Dentistry enjoys one of the most advanced dental education facilities in the world. The new 12-story building on West Fayette Street on the westside of downtown Baltimore was completed in October 2006. The structure replaced a previous building on the site that was only three decades old. The total cost for the new establishment amounted to over $140 million, the highest amount ever spent on an academic building by the State of Maryland.

== Alumni ==
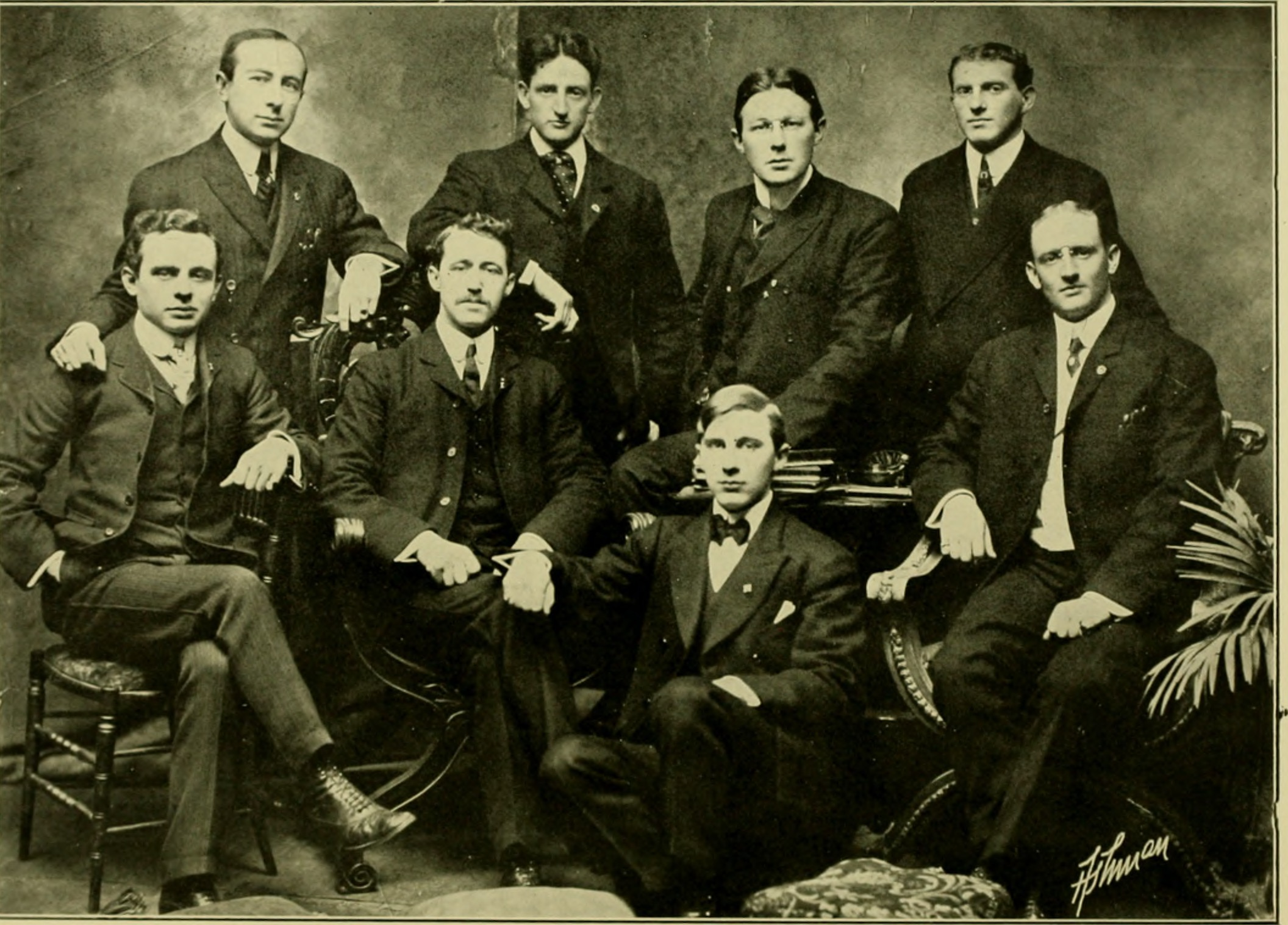
Faculty members of the dental department in 1904

- Harry Estes Kelsey
- George Edward Post, Class of 1863
- John Mankey Riggs, Class of 1854
- Adalbert J. Volck, Class of 1852
- Jordan Belfort, Dropped out on first day
- William T.G. Morton, Class of 1842
- B. Merrill Hopkinson, Class of 1880 (also chaired professor at UMSOD from 1911-1923)
