= University of Pennsylvania School of Dental Medicine =

College in Philadelphia, Pennsylvania

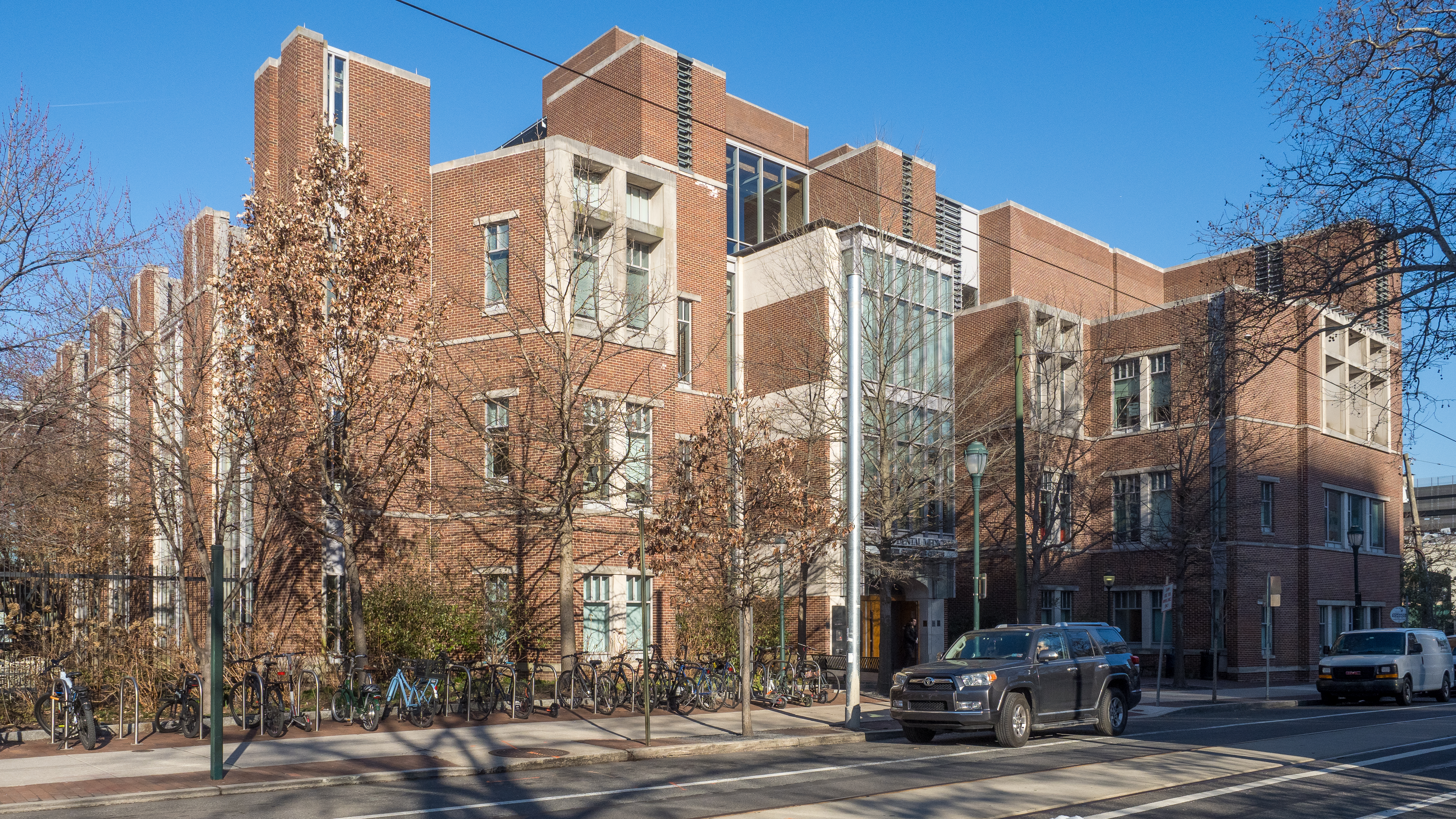
- The Robert Schattner Center
- Former names: Dental Department, University of Pennsylvania
- Motto: Leges sine moribus vanae
- Motto in English: Laws without morals are in vain
- Type: Private
- Established: 1878 (first established in 1852 as Philadelphia College of Dental Surgery)
- Founder: Dr. Charles J. Essig
- Parent institution: University of Pennsylvania
- Academic affiliations: University of Pennsylvania Health System
- President: J. Larry Jameson
- Dean: Mark S Wolff, DDS, PhD
- Academic staff: 42
- Administrative staff: 277
- Students: 690
- Location: 240 South 40th Street, Philadelphia, PA, 19104, USA; 39.952704°N 75.203259°W
- Campus: Urban
- Website: www.dental.upenn.edu

The University of Pennsylvania School of Dental Medicine (often referred to as Penn Dental Medicine or simply Penn Dental) is the dental school of the University of Pennsylvania (Penn), an Ivy League university located in Philadelphia. It is one of twelve graduate schools at Penn and one of several dental schools in Pennsylvania.

== History ==
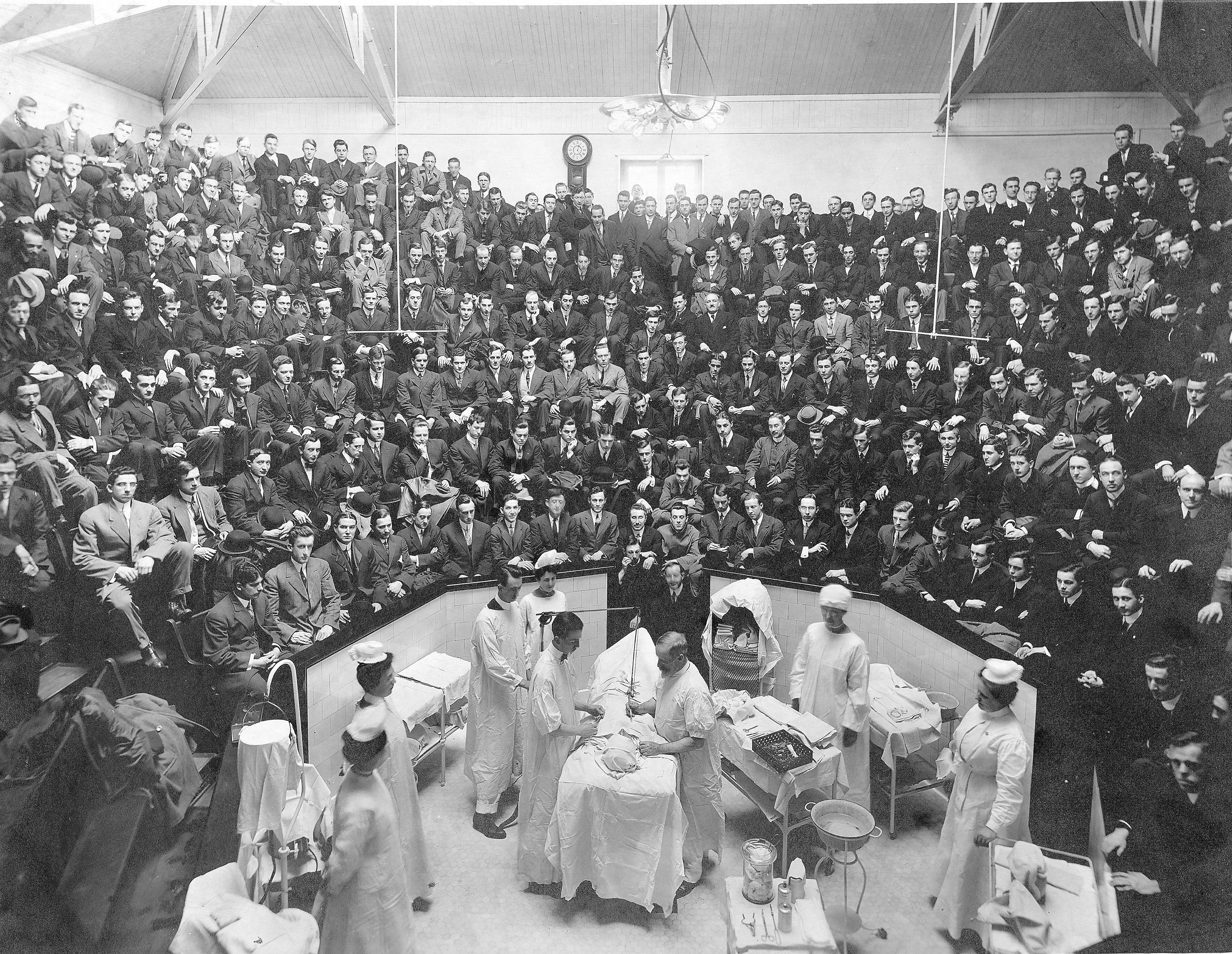
Dental students observing in the Oral Surgery Clinic at the former Philadelphia General Hospital, 1910

Penn Dental Medicine's earliest instance was the Philadelphia College of Dental Surgery, which was founded in 1852. The school was renamed the Pennsylvania College of Dental Surgery in 1878. That same year, Dr. Charles J. Essig founded the Dental Department of the University of Pennsylvania, serving as the first Dean until 1883. Later, in 1909, the Pennsylvania College of Dental Surgery was absorbed into the Penn.

The school's first facilities at Penn's West Philadelphia campus were housed in Medical Hall, later renamed Logan Hall and now Claudia Cohen Hall. This building was later home to the Wharton School, and currently houses several departments of the School of Arts and Sciences. In 1879, Penn Dental Medicine moved to Dental Hall, its first own building on Penn's West Philadelphia campus.

In 1897, a dentist and native of Philadelphia by the name of Thomas W. Evans left his estate to create and maintain a dental school that would be "not inferior to any already established." Evans' generosity made possible the construction of the Evans Building (officially called the Thomas W. Evans Museum and Dental Institute) which opened in 1915, the best-equipped dental building in the nation at that time.

== Facilities ==
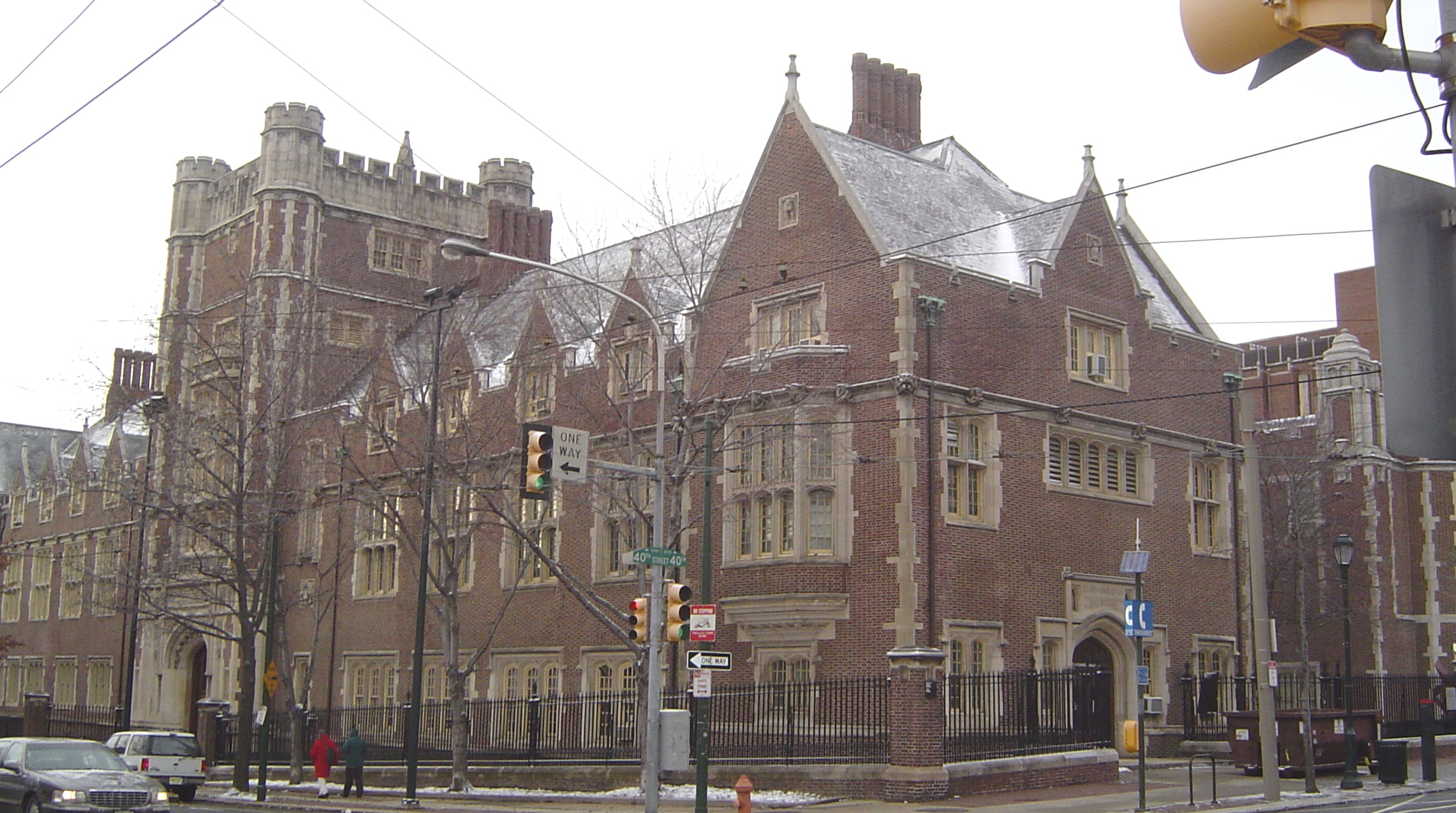
Penn Dental's Thomas W. Evans Institute

Penn Dental has three main buildings, all of which are connected to each other. The Robert Schattner Center, dedicated in 2002, serves as the main entrance to the Dental campus. It has clinical facilities on three levels dedicated to oral surgery to oral and maxillofacial surgery, an emergency clinic, and a faculty practice. The center bears the name of visionary benefactor and Penn Dental alumnus Robert Schattner (D'48), whose gift played a leadership role in successfully funding the building project.

The Leon Levy Center for Oral Health Research, dedicated in 1969, is the school's hub of research activities, made possible by the generosity of Dr. Leon Levy (D'1915). Levy spent most of his life in the communications field (including helping form the Columbia Broadcasting System). The center plays a pivotal role in Penn Dental, providing a home for basic science faculty and the facilities needed to support research programs. Penn remains among the few dental schools in the country with its own basic science faculty and a leader in oral health sciences research.

The Thomas W. Evans Museum and Dental Institute, originally dedicated in 1915, is named for one of Penn Dental's earliest benefactors, Thomas W. Evans. Evans built a dental career on the other side of the Atlantic, becoming the dental surgeon and confidant of Napoleon III. The collegiate gothic, Tutor-style building was considered the most advanced dental teaching facility in the nation when completed in 1915 and helped establish new standards for teaching clinical dentistry in the United States. Today, the Evans Building remains the site of most of the school's classroom instruction and clinical training.

In the atrium of the Schattner Center sits the carriage that Evans and Napoleon III's wife, Eugénie de Montijo, used to escape Prussia's invasion into France.

== Research ==
The school's research enterprise is multidisciplinary, spanning both the basic and clinical sciences, concerned with the structures and functions of tissues and fluids and microbial flora in the oral cavity. Collectively, Penn Dental Medicine investigators contribute to the emerging science and practices shaping dental care. Investigations range from such areas as oral microbiology and virology, inflammation and immunity, tooth development, and the use of analgesics and sedatives, to the cellular biology of connective tissues and bone, the applications for state-of-the-art dental materials, and the causes and effects of periodontal disease. Interdisciplinary research is a hallmark of the University of Pennsylvania, and Penn Dental Medicine investigators collaborate extensively with faculty throughout the Penn campus.

== Notable alumni ==
- James Brister became the first African American to graduate from the school in 1881.
- Allan G. Brodie
- Doc Bushong, DDS, University of Pennsylvania School of Dental Medicine, Class of 1882, was one of the first to matriculate in 1878 in the brand-new Department of Dentistry, and was first University of Pennsylvania graduate from any school at Penn to play in Major League baseball and since he played professional baseball during his time at Penn Dental he could not play for Penn
- Ashley Hebert
- Doc Holliday (as Pennsylvania College of Dental Surgery)
- Robert H. Ivy
- Willoughby D. Miller
- Jacob A. Salzmann
- Garfield Weede (November 26, 1880 – November 21, 1971), DDS, Class of 1906, played football for the University of Pennsylvania as an end and placekicker for a Penn team that was undefeated in 1904 (with a record of 12–0) and has since retroactively been declared "national champions" and also played and coached and /or acted as athletic director for basketball, track and field and, importantly, was one of the first college coaches to "break the color line" and allow racial integration among his players
