= Albert H. Ketcham =

American orthodontist

- Born: August 3, 1870; Whiting, Vermont.
- Education: Boston Dental College, Angle School of Orthodontia
- Known for: First President of American Society of Orthodontists, Albert H. Ketcham award named after him
- Medical career
- Profession: Dentist
- Sub-specialties: orthodontics

Albert H. Ketcham (August 3, 1870 – December 5, 1935) was an American orthodontist and a past president of the American Society of Orthodontists.

== Life and career ==
He was born in Whiting, Vermont, and attended high school at Vermont Academy, Saxtons River. In 1892, Albert graduate from Boston Dental College and then served as a clinical instructor until 1895. In 1894 he married Mary E. Hickson and had two children, Arthur and May. He later married Flora B. Smith and moved to Colorado after contracting pulmonary tuberculosis.

Ketcham was a student of Edward Angle at his Angle School of Orthodontia. He graduated from the school in 1902 and practiced in Colorado until his death. He published more than 40 articles in the Dental and Orthodontic journals between 1902 and 1935. Ketcham served as the first president of the American Society of Orthodontists from 1928 to 1929. He led the pioneering effort to make sure that members also joined local, state, or national dental societies such as the American Dental Association.

In 1935, he died due to bronchial pneumonia in Denver. In the year after his death, the American Board of Orthodontics created the Albert H. Ketcham Award to commemorate Ketcham's achievements. This award is currently known has the highest achievement award given in the field of Orthodontics.

== See also ==
- Archie B. Brusse
- American Society of Orthodontists
