= Edward Angle =

American dentist (1855–1930)

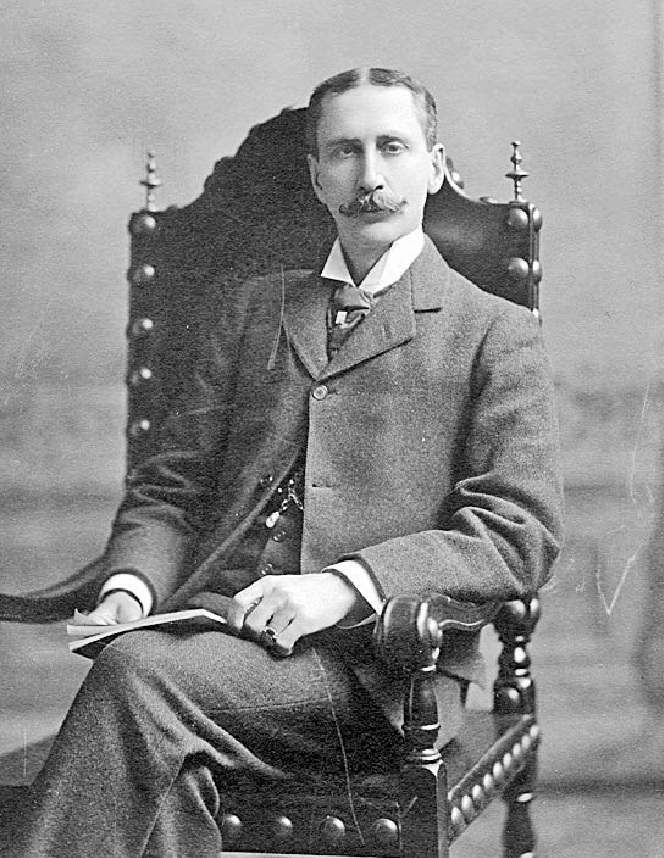
- Angle in 1898
- Born: Edward Hartley Angle; June 1, 1855; Herricks, New York, U.S.
- Died: August 11, 1930 (aged 75)
- Education: Pennsylvania College of Dental Surgery
- Known for: Being the 'father of' modern orthodontics
- Medical career
- Profession: Dentist
- Institutions: University of Minnesota; Northwestern University; Marion Sims College of Medicine; Washington University Medical Department
- Sub-specialties: orthodontics

Edward Hartley Angle (June 1, 1855 – August 11, 1930) was an American dentist, widely regarded as "the father of American orthodontics". He was trained as a dentist, but made orthodontics his speciality and dedicated his life to standardizing the teaching and practice of orthodontics. He founded the Angle School of Orthodontia in 1899 in St. Louis and schools in other regions of the United States. As the originator of the profession, Angle founded three orthodontic schools between 1905 and 1928 in St. Louis, Missouri, New London, Connecticut and Pasadena, California. These exclusive institutions provided the opportunity for several pioneering American orthodontists to receive their training.

== Life ==
He was born to Philip Casebeer Angle and Isabel Erskine Angle in Herricks, New York. He was fifth of the seven children. During his childhood years he demonstrated early talent of working with tools and machinery including hay rake. He attended high school in Canton, Pennsylvania. Before joining dental school, he worked for a local dentist from 1874 to 1876. He studied at the Pennsylvania College of Dental Surgery and became a dentist in 1878. He then started working in town of Towanda, Pennsylvania soon after his graduation. In 1881, he developed chronic respiratory problem which forced him to move to Minnesota for few months. As soon as his health improved, he came back to Pennsylvania to eventually move to Montana to open a sheep-ranching business with his older brother Mahlon. In 1882, he moved to Minneapolis after the Winter of 1882 killed the sheep at his ranch. He married Florence A Canning in March 1887 and had a daughter named Florence Elizabeth Angle. In 1904 Angle served as the Chairman of the Orthodontics section at the fourth International Dental Congress in St. Louis.

He married Anna Hopkins in St. Louis in 1908 after getting divorced from his earlier wife. Before marrying Dr. Angle, Anna had earned her DDS degree from University of Iowa College of Dentistry in 1902. He moved to Larchmont, New York, with Anna in 1908, where he taught a 6-week course through his school. He eventually moved to New London, Connecticut, in 1911, in a Tudor Revival custom design house located at 58 Bellevue Place, sold to him by a New London great architect, Dudley St. Clair Donnelly, where he continued teaching, but for health reasons he was forced to leave to Pasadena, California. He eventually opened his school in his new Tudor revival home, designed by the same architect of 58 Bellevue Place, in Pasadena in 1917.

== Early career ==
In 1886, he took a position as a faculty to teach comparative anatomy and orthodontia at the University of Minnesota. He at the same time maintained his private practice of dentistry in Minneapolis. Angle's original interest was in prosthodontics, and he taught in that department in the dental schools at Pennsylvania and Minnesota in the 1880s. In 1887, he published a 14-page paper in a textbook by Loomis Haskell, which eventually became to known as his "first" edition of the seven editions he published of his famous book. He was then elected as the President of the Minneapolis City Dental Society in 1888 after which he published his second edition of the textbook in 1890. He resigned his position as a faculty at the University of Minnesota and officially limited his practice towards Orthodontics. In 1892, he published his third edition of the textbook called "The angle system of regulation and retention of teeth. The fourth edition, The angle system of regulation and retention of teeth and treatment of fractures of maxillae, was published in 1895. He then relocated to St. Louis, Missouri, with his family and his assistant, Anna Hopkins whom he hired in 1892. He earned his Medical degree from Marion Sims College in 1897.

From 1892 to 1898 he was a professor of orthodontics at the Northwestern University Dental School, between 1886 and 1899 he was a professor of orthodontics at the Marion Sims College of Medicine and from 1897 to 1899 at the Washington University Medical Department. He published the sixth edition of his textbook in 1900.

== Orthodontics ==
In November 1899, he taught a Postgraduate course on orthodontia in his office in St. Louis where his students urged him to create a school for teaching Orthodontics. He founded the Angle School of Orthodontia in St. Louis, Missouri 1900, where he formally established orthodontics as a specialty. With Angle the specialty of orthodontics received a new impetus. He coined the term malocclusion to refer to anomalies of tooth position and classified various abnormalities of the teeth and jaws, invented appliances for their treatment and devised several surgical techniques as well. Angle standardized appliances in a series of books and pamphlets, including a text that he authored, Treatment of Malocclusion of the Teeth and Fractures of the Maxillae: Angle's System.

His increasing interest in dental occlusion and in the treatment necessary to obtain normal occlusion led directly to his development of orthodontics as a specialty, with himself as the "father of modern orthodontics". The development of Angle's classification of malocclusion in the 1890s was an important step in the development of orthodontics because it not only subdivided major types of malocclusion but also included the first clear and simple definition of normal occlusion in the natural dentition.

In the 1890s, Edward H. Angles proposed a classification system for malocclusion, which revolutionized the field of orthodontics. He suggested that as long as the top and bottom molars were arranged in a smoothly curving line of occlusion and connected so that the mesiobuccal cusp of the upper molar occluded in the buccal groove of the lower molar, then normal occlusion would result. Concurrently, this comprehensive system provided clarity and simplicity to defining healthy dentition alignment with its categorization of major types of malocclusion.

Angle was concerned with the aesthetics of orthodontics as well as functionality and so he collaborated with the artist and art educator Edmund H. Wuerpel in applying aesthetics to his field. The artist and dentist collaborated for many years and Wuerpel lectured frequently at Angle's request, in St. Louis as well as in Pasadena.

The Angle Orthodontist, founded in 1930, is the official publication of the Edward H. Angle Society of Orthodontists, society established in 1922, and is published bimonthly in January, March, May, July, September and November by The EH Angle Education and Research Foundation Inc. In 1901, he also founded the Society of Orthodontists, which later became American Society of Orthodontists.

Having a full set of teeth on both arches was highly sought after in orthodontic treatment due to the need for exact relationships between them. Extraction as an orthodontic procedure was heavily opposed by Angle and those who followed him. As occlusion became the key priority, facial proportions and esthetics were neglected. To achieve ideal occlusals without using external forces, Angle postulated that having perfect occlusion was the best way to gain optimum facial aesthetics.

Edward Angle has 46 patents to his name.

== Classification of malocclusions ==
In the 1890s, Edward H. Angles proposed a classification system for malocclusion, which revolutionized the field of orthodontics. He suggested that as long as the top and bottom molars were arranged in a smoothly curving line of occlusion and connected so that the mesiobuccal cusp of the upper molar occluded in the buccal groove of the lower molar, then normal occlusion would result. Concurrently, this comprehensive system provided clarity and simplicity to defining healthy dentition alignment with its categorization of major types of malocclusion.

Angle delineated three distinct forms of malocclusion, as determined by the occlusal relationship of the first molars:

- Class I: An incorrect line of occlusion due to misaligned teeth, rotations or other issues
- Class II: A distal positioning of the lower molar against its upper equivalent, with no reference to line of occlusion given
- Class III: The lower molar being mesial to its counterpart, again without a noted line of occlusion.

The Angle classification divides occlusion and malocclusion into four distinct classes: normal occlusion, Class I, II, and III. Although both normal occlusion and Class I have the same molar alignment relationship, there is a distinction in how their teeth are organized in relation to the line of occlusion. As for Classes II and III malocclusion, it depends whether or not the line of occlusion is accurate. Once a molar position is determined, a line of occlusion forms along its central fossa that smoothly meanders across both upper and lower teeth. This line follows through on all canine and incisor cingulums as well as down along buccal cusps and incisal edges of lower teeth. All this establishes both interarch and occlusal relationships.

== Appliances ==
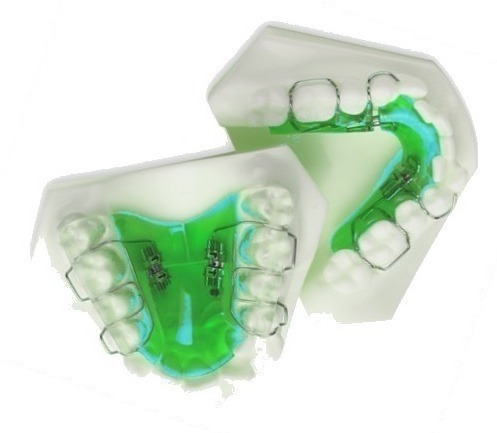
Upper and Lower Jaw Functional Expanders

- E (expansion) Arch Appliance (1907) - There were two types: Basic & Ribbed. This applianced only allowed tipping movement and provided poor control of individual tooth position.
- Pin & Tube Appliance (1910) - Consisted of Gold and Platinum bands and had attachment to all the teeth. These bands had vertical tubes that were soldered to them and a Pin was passed through it to achieve tooth movement. Root parallelism and rotation was difficult to achieve with this appliance. In addition, the pins had to be repositioned every appointment through the process of re-soldering.
- Ribbon Arch Appliance (1915) - This appliance was created after the Pin and Tube appliance. This device consisted of a Vertical bracket soldered to a band. It allowed rotation to be possible. Dr. Raymond Begg eventually used this appliance to create his light wire technique.
- Edgewise Appliance (1925) - These were identical brackets for all teeth and it allowed tooth movement in all 3 planes of space by adding bends to the rectangular arch-wire, one of its disadvantages. The wire was held in the slot by metal ligature. In this appliance, the slot was changed from vertically to horizontally. Therefore, the bracket was wide mesio-distally and its slot size was .022 x .028 inch. These brackets were initially referred to as "open face" or "tie brackets".
  - The edgewise bracket has been later modified to Single Width Bracket, Siamese Bracket, Lewis Bracket, Steiner Bracket, Broussard Bracket.

== Death ==
Angle died on August 11, 1930, in Santa Monica at the age of 75 from heart failure saying, "I have finished my work and I did my best." He was buried in Mountain View Cemetery in Altadena, California.

== See also ==
- Calvin Case
