= American Association of Orthodontists =

Association of orthodontists in USA

Founded in 1900, the American Association of Orthodontists (AAO) is the world's oldest and largest dental specialty organization. It represents nearly 19,000 orthodontist members throughout the United States, Canada and abroad. All orthodontists are dentists and may simultaneously hold membership in the American Dental Association. Its headquarters are in Creve Coeur, Missouri, near St. Louis.

Orthodontists are dental specialists in the diagnosis, prevention, and treatment of orthodontic problems who have completed two to four years of advanced training in an accredited orthodontic residency program. Only those dentists who have completed this training may call themselves "orthodontists," and only orthodontists may be members of the American Association of Orthodontists.

In 2013 Gayle Glenn was elected as the first female president of the American Association of Orthodontists.

AAO is affiliated with the Canadian Association of Orthodontists.

== See also ==
- Orthodontics
- Canadian Association of Orthodontists
