= David Turpin =

David Turpin may refer to:

- David Allen Turpin, an American convicted with his wife for child abuse in the Turpin case
- David H. Turpin (born 1956), Canadian scholar and president and vice-chancellor of the University of Alberta
- David L. Turpin, American orthodontist
