= Mirdza E. Neiders =

Latvian American professor

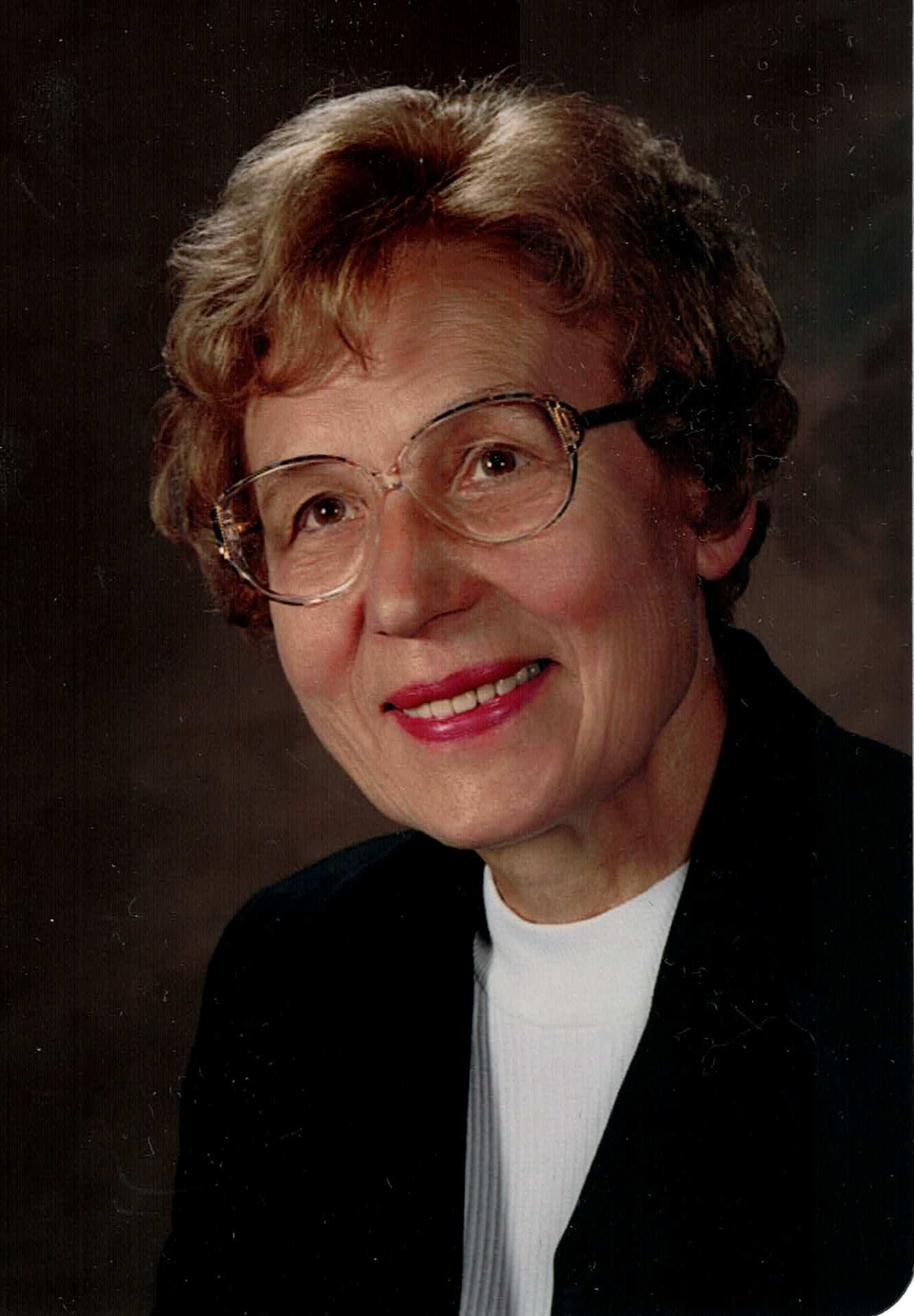
- SUNY-Distinguished Teaching Professor

Mirdza E. Neiders (born August 21, 1933) is a Latvian American professor, researcher, and oral pathologist. She was the first woman to be board-certified in oral and maxillofacial pathology in the United States. A SUNY distinguished teaching professor, she supported underrepresented students at the University at Buffalo such as women, international students, and other minorities.

She has contributed to research with nearly 100 publications. She taught undergraduate and graduate students at the University at Buffalo (UB) for 57 years. As a member of UB’s Oral Sciences Master’s Program, Neiders was the thesis supervisor for a number of M.S. degree students. She retired in August 2021.

== Personal life ==
Neiders was born in Riga, Latvia on August 21, 1933. Her father, Karlis, was a physician and her mother, Erika, was a dentist. Latvia was occupied by the Soviet Union in 1940, and then later by the Nazis in 1941. In 1944, her family left Latvia to flee from the second Soviet occupation. After World War II ended, Neiders, her parents, and her three siblings became displaced persons in the American Zone of Germany.

The family migrated to the United States on March 3, 1950. Neiders did not know English when she was placed in 11th grade at a secondary school in Marshalltown, Iowa. She credits one of her teachers, Miss Cooper, with teaching her English after school in just one and a half years as well as inspiring her to be a teacher.

Before attending college, Neiders worked at jobs where English was not required. She worked at an egg and poultry company, cleaned houses, and was a cashier in her high school cafeteria. Her family moved to Ohio after her father passed the Ohio State medical licensure examination in 1952.

After studying at Ohio State University, the University of Michigan, and the University of Chicago, Neiders moved to New York State and joined the faculty at the University of Buffalo in 1962.

Currently, Neiders is retired and resides in Snyder, New York. She has two children and three grandchildren.

== Education/training/certifications ==
| Institution | Degree | Years | Field of Study |
| Marshalltown Junior College | -- | 1951-1952 | -- |
| Ohio State University | -- | 1952-1954 | Biology |
| University of Michigan, School of Dentistry | DDS | 1954-1958 | Dentistry |
| University of Chicago, School of Medicine | MS | 1959-1961 | General Pathology |
| University of Chicago, Zoller Dental Clinic | Certificate | 1959-1962 | Oral Pathology |
| University at Buffalo, School of Dentistry | Certificate | 1971-1974 | Periodontics |

From 1951-1952, Neiders attended Marshalltown Junior College. After that, she attended Ohio State University from 1952-1954 but did not receive a degree.

In 1954, she was accepted into the dental school at the University of Michigan and received her DDS in 1958. In 1961, she received her master’s degree in general pathology from the University of Chicago.

In 1964, she took the examination of the American Board of Oral Pathology and became the first woman ever in the United States to be a certified oral and maxillofacial pathologist. At the University at Buffalo, she took training in Periodontics from 1971-1974 while working as a professor.

== Scientific career ==
Neiders has expertise in many fields, including oral pathology, periodontal disease, immunology, and immunofluorescence. During her time as a professor, she did an abundance of research.

From 1974-1975, Neiders took a sabbatical leave to be a guest scientist at the National Institute of Allergy and Infectious Disease (NIAID), and the National Institutes of Health (NIH).

She is one of the directors at Beutner Laboratories. She collaborated and worked with Ernst Beutner and utilized the methods he prescribed to diagnose oral diseases. She specializes in the diagnosis of autoimmune skin and mucous membrane illnesses using immunological methods.

Currently, she serves as an honorary consultant for KSL Diagnostics and Beutner Laboratories, which are both located in Western New York.

== Publications ==
Neiders has about 100 publications, covering a wide range of topics. Main areas of research included:

- Cell attachment to teeth
- Host-bacterial interactions in periodontal disease
- Using immunological techniques in the diagnosis of mucosal diseases

== Teaching career ==
In 1962, Neiders began teaching as Assistant Professor of Oral Pathology at the University of Buffalo (UB). She obtained full professorship in 1970. She taught undergraduate and graduate students for 57 years.

Neiders taught undergraduate student courses in oral pathology, general pathology, and periodontology. To train postgraduate and graduate students, she taught in the Oral and Maxillofacial Pathology Certificate Training Program. She was a director of this program from 1980-1984. She also taught students in the Oral Sciences Master’s Program as a thesis supervisor and committee member.

== Honors and awards ==
Neiders has received numerous honors and awards recognizing her contributions to education and dentistry.

- Omicron Kappa Upsilon Honorary Society, University of Michigan – 1958

Given to people in the top 10% of their dental school class.

- Alpha Omega Dental Fraternity Teacher of the Year Award – 1988, 2001
- SUNY Chancellor’s Award for Excellence in Teaching – 2001
- SUNY Distinguished Teaching Professor – 2002
- Award for Outstanding Contributions to International Education – 2004 To recognize her contribution of mentoring Latvian international students at UB.
- Doctor Honoris Causa, Riga Stradins University – 2005 For giving support to faculty members from the Latvian School of Dentistry to travel to UB and dental meetings in the United States to learn about advances in dentistry.
