= Howard University College of Dentistry =

Private dental college in Washington, D.C.

Coordinates: 38.9196°N 77.020°W

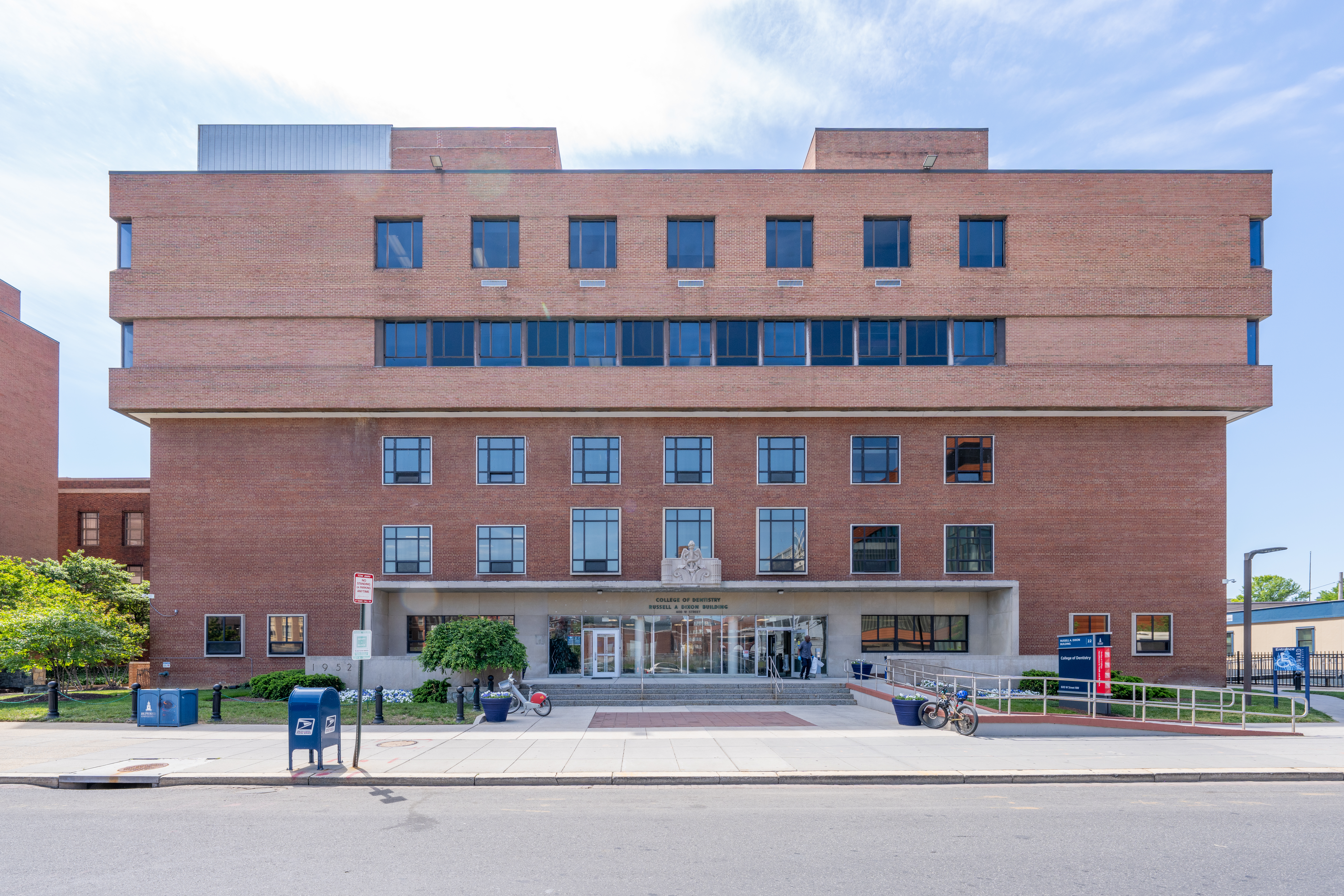
- Type: Private university
- Established: 1881
- Dean: Dexter Woods
- Location: Washington, D.C., U.S.
- Website: dentistry.howard.edu

Howard University College of Dentistry is a school of dentistry located in the United States city of Washington, D.C. It is the only dental school in Washington, D.C..

== History ==
Howard University College of Dentistry is a part of Howard University. The school was established in 1881 as the fifth oldest dental school in United States.

The first African-American dean and longest-serving dean (1931–1966) was Russel A. Dixon. He was committed to racial integration and gender equality in dental education.

By 1960, more than half of the US's 1,681 African American dentists were graduates of the Howard University College of Dentistry.

On July 1, 1975, Jeanne Sinkford became the first female dean of any American dental school when she was appointed the dean of Howard University College of Dentistry.

== Academics ==
Howard University College of Dentistry awards following degrees:

- Doctor of Dental Surgery
- Certificate in Oral and Maxillofacial Surgery
- Certificate in Orthodontics
- Certificate in Pediatric Dentistry
- Certificate in Advanced Education Program in General Dentistry
- Certificate in General Practice Residency

== Departments ==
Howard University College of Dentistry includes the following departments:

- Department of Restorative Services
- Department of Preventive Services
- Department of Dental Hygiene
- Department of Diagnostic Services
- Department of Endodontics
- Department of Oral and Maxillofacial Surgery
- Department of Pediatric Dentistry
- Department of Orthodontics

== Accreditation ==
Howard University College of Dentistry is currently accredited by American Dental Association.
