= Russel Alexander Dixon =

African American dentist and academic

Russel Alexander Dixon (February 24, 1898 – January 3, 1976) was the first African-American to earn an advanced degree in dentistry from Northwestern University and the first African American dean of Howard University College of Dentistry. He was the longest serving dean in dental education, with a 35 year tenure from 1931 to 1966.

== Early life and education ==
Russel A. Dixon was born on February 24, 1898, in Kansas City, Missouri to father, William James Dixon, and mother Lillie Belle Tribue Dixon. He attended Hampton Institute from 1919 to 1920, but switched to Ferris Institute, where he completed an undergraduate degree from 1920 to 1924. In 1929 he received his Doctor of Dental Surgery (DDS) degree from Northwestern University Dental School. Furthermore, in 1933 he became the first African American to earn a Masters of Science in Dentistry from Northwestern University. In 1965, Dixon received an Honorary Doctorate from Ferris State University.

== Howard University School of Dentistry ==
Dixon became part of the Howard Dental School faculty in 1929 and was appointed Acting Dean of Howard Dental School in 1931. He was later appointed and remained dean until his retirement in 1966. During his tenure he contributed greatly to the curriculum, enrolment requirements, academic preparation of the dental faculty, and planning of a new dental building. He was committed to racial integration and gender equality in dental education. By 1960, more than half of the US's 1,681 African American dentists were graduates of the Howard University College of Dentistry.

== Professional organizations and contributions ==
Dixon served many administrative and academic positions throughout his career. In 1949 he was appointed president of the PanAmerican Odontological Society and the National Dental Association. He served on the Executive Council of the American Association of Dental Schools from 1953 to 1967. In 1963, President John F. Kennedy appointed him to a four-year term as a member of the Board of Regents of the National Library of Medicine. He was a member of the Board of Overseers Visiting Committee of Harvard University for the Schools of Medicine and Dental Medicine and of the Special Advisory Group of the Veterans Administration. He was a founding member and former president of the Pi Pi Chapter of Omicron Kappa Upsilon.

Dixon was a member of the Lincoln Memorial Congregational Temple of the United Church of Christ. He held a number of positions with the national organization, including chairman of the Missions Council of the Congregational Christian Churches of America.

== Personal life and death ==
Dixon was married to Carolyn Dixon (née Kealing). The couple had two sons, one of whom attended both Howard University College of Dentistry and Northwestern University.

Dixon died after suffering a heart attack on January 3, 1976, at the age of 77 in Silver Spring, Maryland.
