= Turner Memorial A.M.E. Church =

Church in Hyattsville, Maryland, US

Coordinates: 38°58′45″N 76°58′51″W

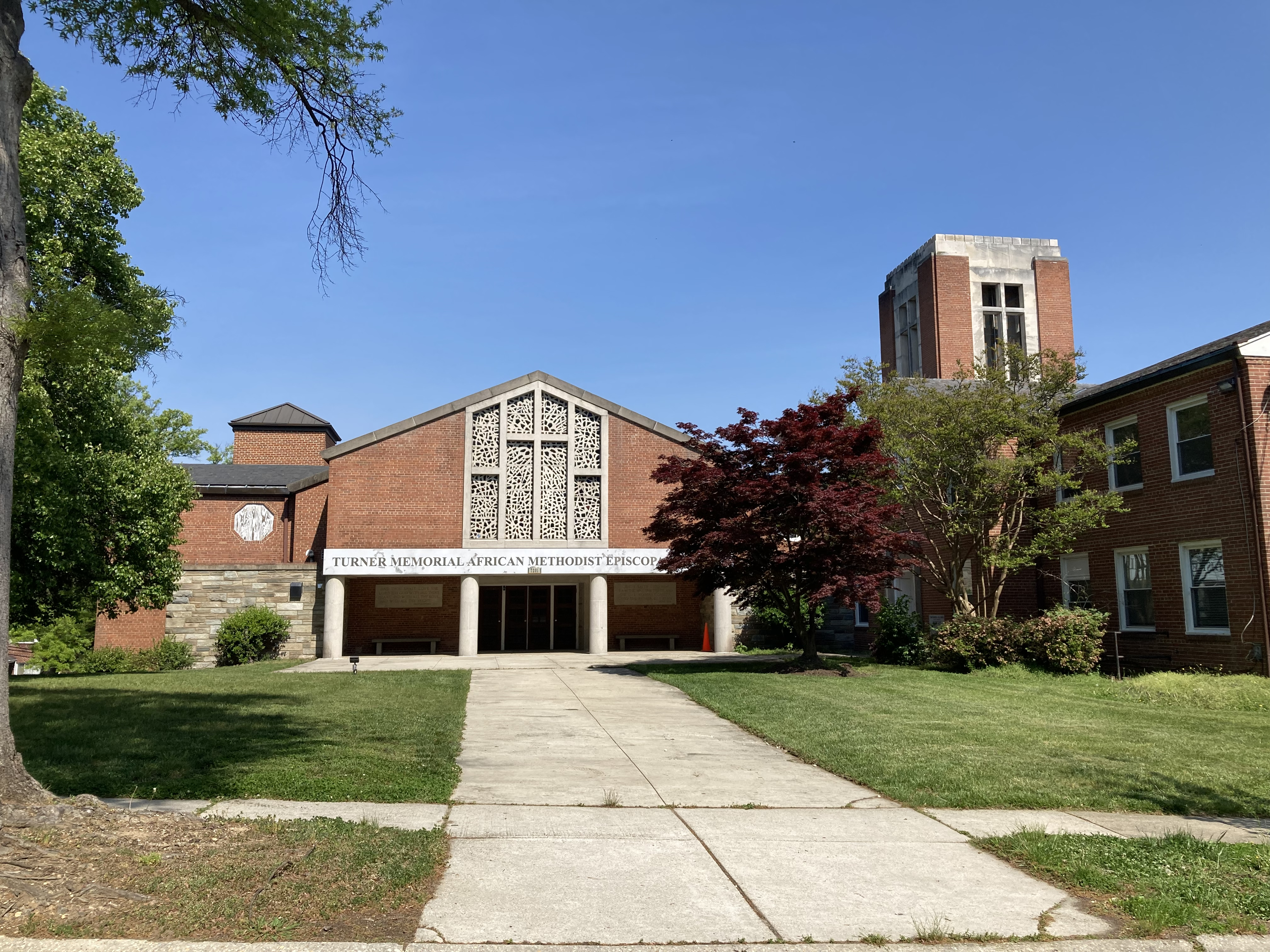
- Turner Memorial A.M.E. Church

- Address: 7201 16th Place, Hyattsville, Maryland
- Country: United States
- Denomination: African Methodist Episcopal Church
- Website: turner-ame.org

History
- Status: Active
- Founded: 1915
- Dedication: Henry McNeal Turner

Architecture
- Style: Modernism
- Completed: 1956 (current building)

Administration
- District: Capital District

Turner Memorial African Methodist Episcopal Church is an African Methodist Episcopal Church congregation in the US National Capital Region. Over its history, it has been located at three sites: two in Washington, D.C., (including more than half a century in what is now the Sixth & I Historic Synagogue) and, since 2003, a location near Hyattsville in Prince George's County, Maryland. Founded in 1915, the church's namesake was A.M.E. Bishop Henry McNeal Turner.

== Congregational history ==
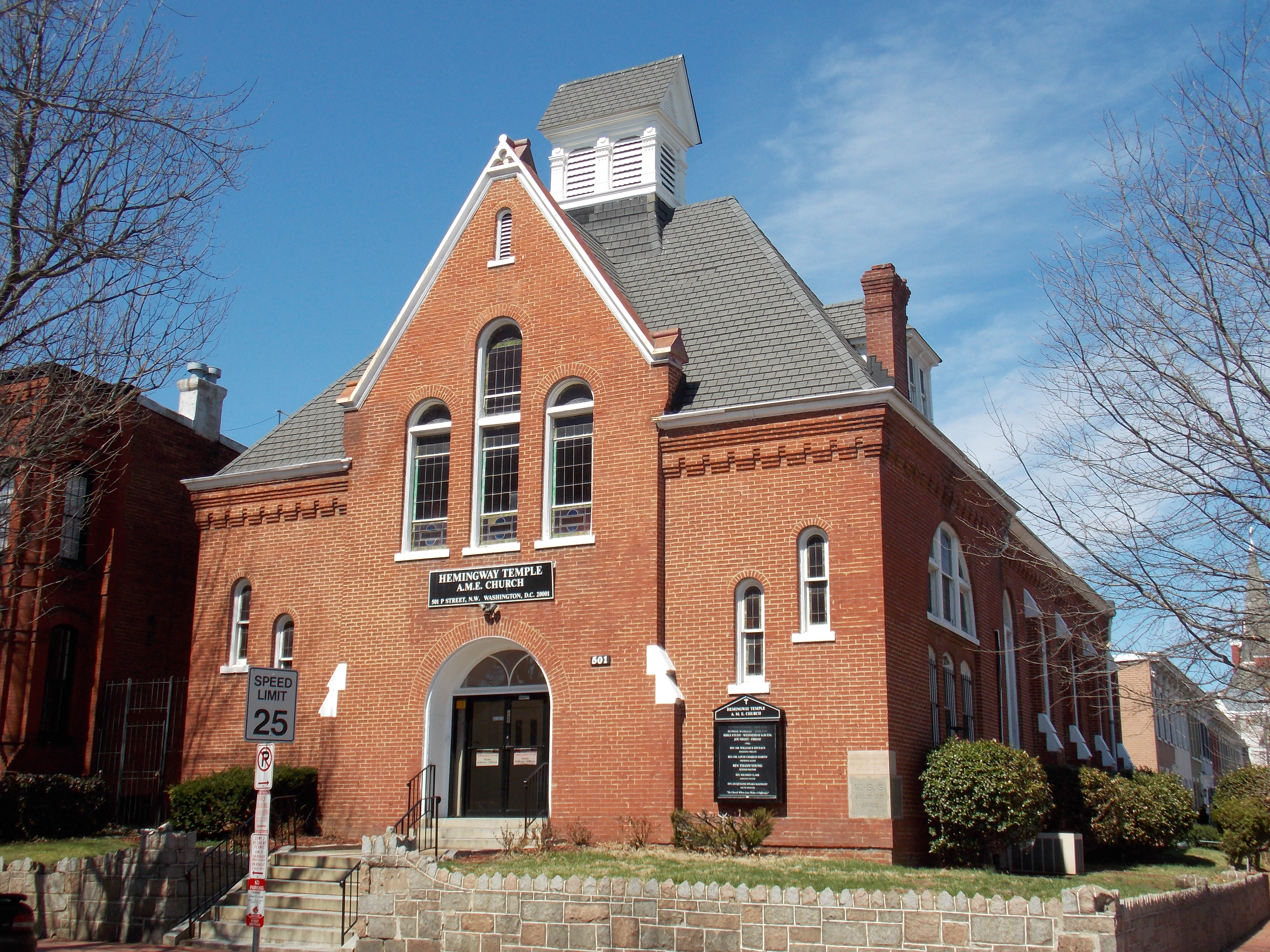
The original location of Turner Memorial A.M.E. Church, now Hemingway Temple A.M.E. Church.

The congregation, one of America's historically black churches, was founded in 1915 by members of St. Paul A.M.E. Church who wished to organize an African Methodist Episcopal congregation in the neighborhood where they lived. Many of the founding members had recently become residents of a black section of the LeDroit Park suburb, and Bishop Turner—who died in May 1915—urged the new residents to continue the charitable work St. Paul's had supported in their new neighborhood. The first organizational meeting occurred in July 1915, with Sunday school beginning in October 1915. The church, which took the late Bishop Turner's name, began meeting for Sunday services in rented spaces in 1916.

The congregation purchased a preexisting church at the corner of 5th and P Streets NW in Shaw in 1919, dedicating it in Turner's memory on July 20, 1919. (This building dated back to 1881, when it was built by William Stickney, the son-in-law of Gallaudet University founder Amos Kendall and a longtime board member of the institution for the deaf. The building became known as the Stickney Memorial Chapel. Prior to its purchase by Turner Memorial, it was the home of the Washington Shaker Society.) On February 20, 1927, a fire nearly destroyed the building, prompting the church to raise funds to rebuild from A.M.E. churches across the city. Between 1944 and 1946, the church moved from mission status to being a station charge of the A.M.E. conference.

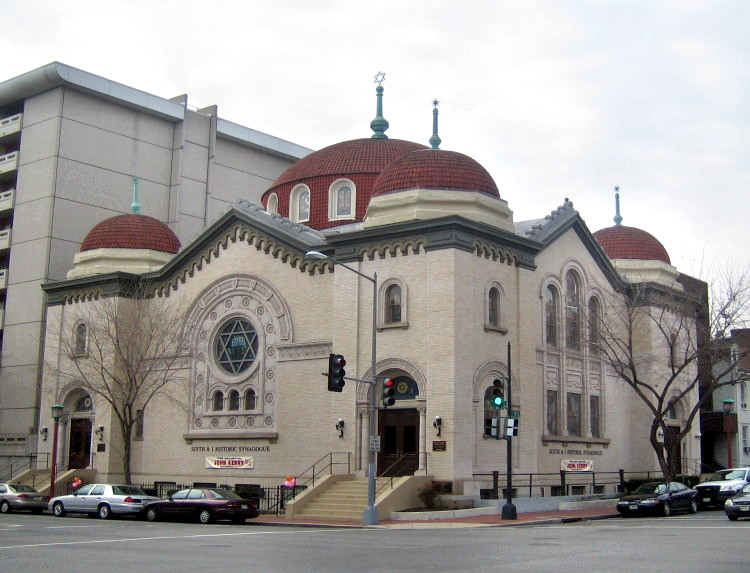
Turner Memorial AME Church's building from 1951 to 2003 (the Sixth & I Historic Synagogue) in 2006

By the late 1940s, the 5th and P building, with a capacity of 500 to 600, was outpaced by the church's membership of 700. Looking for more space, in 1951, Turner Memorial purchased the former Adas Israel synagogue at Sixth and I Streets NW. The congregation's trustees, along with Bishop Lawrence Henry Hemingway and Congregation Adas Israel, were sued by a real estate firm alleging that the parties to the sale did not pay an agreed upon commission. Some of the members chose to stay at the 5th and P location, so Bishop Hemingway bought the building from the Turner trustees, then sold it to the Baltimore-Washington conference of the A.M.E. Church, which continued on as of 2025 as Hemingway Temple A.M.E. Church.

Under the leadership of Pastor Isaac A. Miller, who oversaw the move to Sixth and I, the church appointed dozens of lay leaders as "stewards" to fill roles in church operations. During the pastorate of Samuel Everett Guiles from 1955 until his death in 1980, the church housed Freedom Riders and hosted civil rights meetings in its basement. One participant in these meetings was future Washington mayor Marion Barry, wearing a dashiki, who offended the church's stewards by smoking cigarettes in the church and cursing when asked to stop. During the 1970s, Turner Memorial had as many as 1,200 member families who joined members of other area churches in resisting urban renewal plans that would have involved relocation of businesses and residents.

The Sixth and I building was renovated in the 1980s to replace pews and remove the Star of David symbols. Lifelong parishioner Bobby Ashe, an architect who was elected to the church's board of trustees, designed a 10 feet (3.0 m) diameter stained glass window emblazoned with bright purple, blue, red, gold, brown and white. The window included 10 Christian symbols (including a dove, the Cross and Crown, three fish, an olive branch and lilies), as well as the blacksmith's anvil of the A.M.E. logo. Ashe, who was also president of the Downtown Cluster of Congregations, later died of cancer related to complications from AIDS at the age of 32.

The church built an adjacent four-story multi-purpose building in 1979 and launched a nursery school in the 1990s. By the early 2000s, the redevelopment of the Chinatown area and the construction of the MCI Center raised the cost of parking for parishioners. The congregation put its building on the market, advertising it as "suitable for a nightclub". The Sixth and I building was sold for $5 million to developers led by Abe Pollin to be renovated as a synagogue and cultural center. Turner AME pastor Darryl Walker told The Washington Post that he was pleased the building would remain a sacred space. "We were in a position that we had to take the best offer we had," he said, acknowledging the idea of the synagogue becoming a nightclub "did not fit well."

In 2003, after 52 years in the building at Sixth and I, the congregation purchased for $3.8 million the more spacious 1959 modernist building of Wallace Memorial United Presbyterian Church on a three-and-a-half-acre site near Hyattsville.

Turner Memorial's 94th anniversary service in 2009 featured a sermon from Vashti Murphy McKenzie, the first female A.M.E. bishop. As of 2012, the church had approximately 500 members and leased space to a Spanish-speaking congregation.

== Architectural history ==
Turner Memorial's present building at Drexel and Erskine Avenues in the Carole Highlands neighborhood was erected in 1956 as a chapel of Wallace Memorial United Presbyterian Church, then located on Randolph Street and New Hampshire Avenue Northwest in Washington. The cornerstone was laid in June 1955 and construction on the chapel was completed in 1956. Howe, Foster and Snyder was the project's architectural firm and E. A. Baker & Co. built the chapel.

In 1958, Wallace sold its Washington location and moved all of its operations to the new building in Hyattsville. After this move, Wallace added a three-story education building and a 600-seat sanctuary to the campus. Half a century later, after selling the Hyattsville location to Turner Memorial, Wallace relocated to a new building in College Park.

The interior of the sanctuary includes stained glass windows depicting Richard and Sarah Allen, Rosa Parks and McKenzie.

== Views ==
In 2012, then-pastor William H. Lamar IV authored an op-ed in The Washington Post calling the focus in African-American churches over same-sex marriage movement in the wrong direction. He wrote that "talking about homosexual brokenness without talking about heterosexual brokenness is intellectually dishonest and more than that, it reeks of self-righteousness and scapegoating. It seems that we have become expert at confessing the sins of the homosexual bedroom while ignoring the sins of the heterosexual bedroom." He also questioned why African-American churches were discussing homosexuality instead of educational disparities, the persistence of poverty and the war on drugs.

== Activities ==
The congregation operates the Henry McNeal Turner Community Development Corporation, which has been a tax-exempt 501(c)(3) nonprofit since 2000. The nonprofit engages in food distribution, health information and voter education.
