= Wallace Presbyterian Church =

Church in College Park, Maryland, US

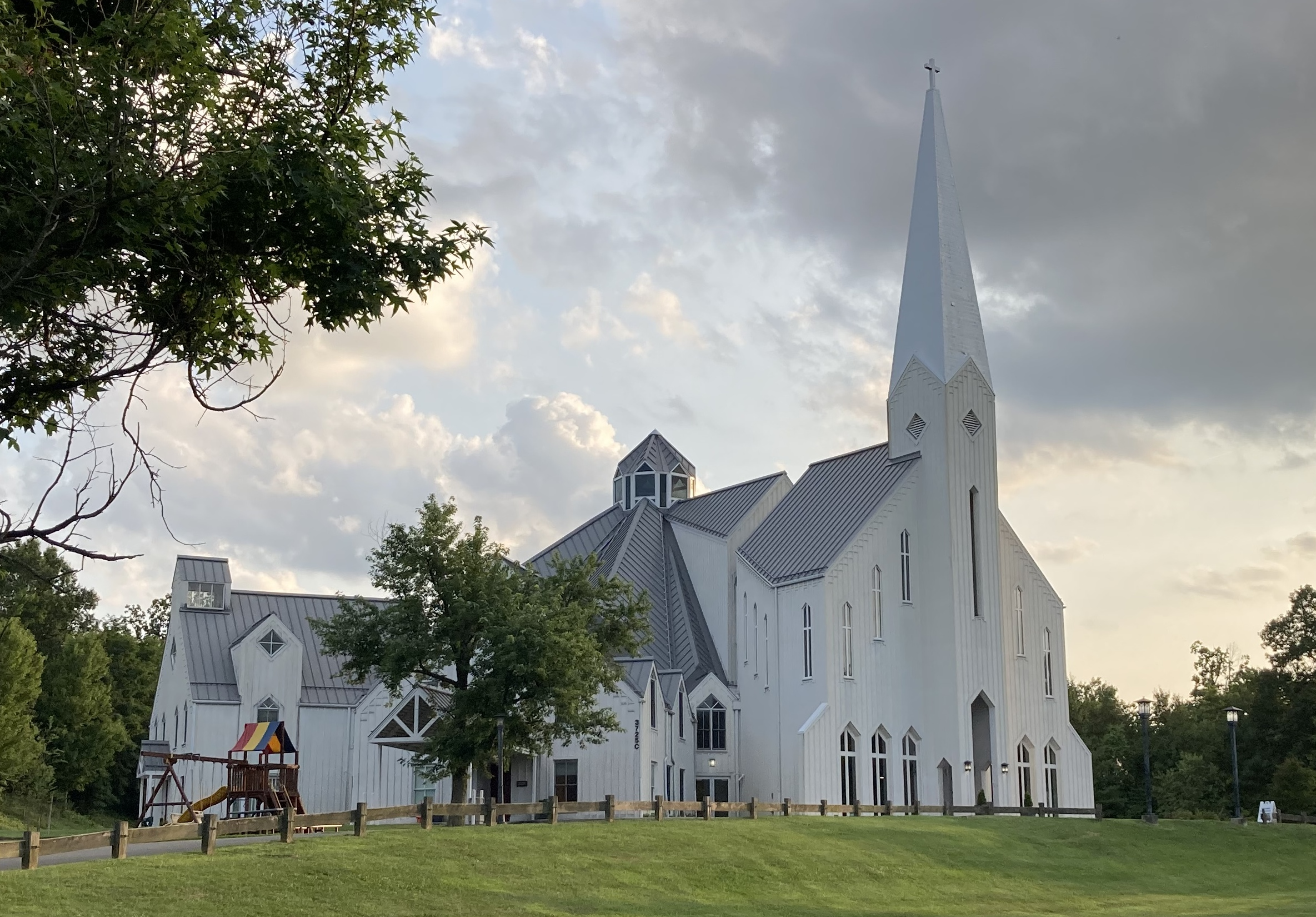
- Wallace Presbyterian Church in 2023

- Location within Maryland
- 39°0′0″N 76°56′44″W
- Address: 3725 Metzerott Road, College Park, Maryland
- Country: United States
- Denomination: Presbyterian Church in America
- Previous denomination: United Presbyterian Church of North America
- Website: wallacepca.org

History
- Former names: Knox Memorial United Presbyterian Church; First United Presbyterian Church of Washington, D.C.; Wallace Memorial United Presbyterian Church
- Founded: April 10, 1910
- Dedicated: June 28, 2009

Architecture
- Architect: Andre Houston
- Style: Modern Carpenter Gothic
- Years built: 2005–2009
- Groundbreaking: 2005
- Completed: 2009
- Construction cost: $6.5 million

Specifications
- Capacity: 450

Wallace Presbyterian Church is a Presbyterian church in College Park, Maryland, United States. Founded in 1910 to serve as the "national church" for the United Presbyterian Church of North America (UPCNA), Wallace grew to have several hundred members and became a prominent evangelical congregation within the Presbyterian tradition. It was also a church home for several prominent United Presbyterians who served in Congress or in U.S. government service in the capital. The congregation and its leaders were also active participants in debates about doctrine and church practice that resulted in schism within the mainline Presbyterian churches in the 1970s and 1980s. After leaving the mainline, Wallace eventually became part of the Presbyterian Church in America (PCA).

Since its founding, it has had three main locations throughout its history: first in Washington, D.C., then moving to Hyattsville, Maryland, in the 1950s and to its present building in College Park in 2009, where it is an eye-catching presence near the University of Maryland campus. As of 2025, Wallace describes itself as one of the most diverse churches in the PCA.

== History ==
=== Founding and growth ===
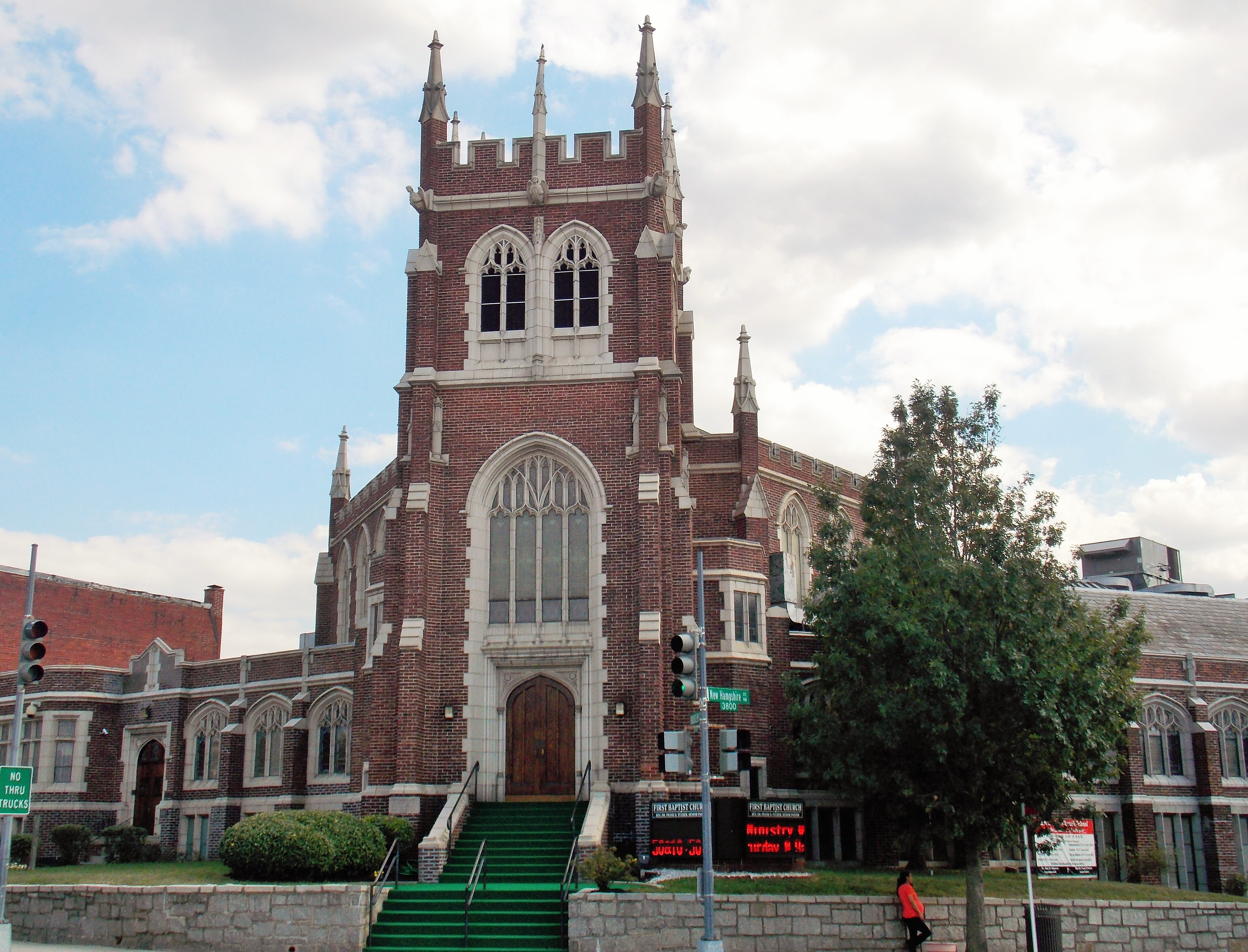
Wallace Presbyterian Church's Gothic Revival building in Petworth from 1915 to 1958

Wallace was founded by 20 members as the Knox Memorial United Presbyterian Church. Its first meetings were held on April 10, 1910. The congregation was formally organized on June 10 of that year. Its first building, near the intersection of Georgia and New Hampshire Avenues in Washington's Petworth neighborhood, was a one-story frame pebble-dashed edifice dedicated in October 1910. Donald MacLeod of the First Presbyterian Church preached at the dedication, using the occasion to criticize J. P. Morgan obliquely for withdrawing from the Episcopal Church's 1910 General Convention when the subject of miracles was discussed. William W. Logan was the founding minister, followed by J. Alvin Campbell, who was appointed in 1911.

In 1911, the church renamed itself the First United Presbyterian Church of Washington, D.C. The next year, the Philadelphia Presbytery petitioned the general assembly of the UPCNA to name the congregation its "national church" in Washington. March 1915 saw the completion of a $35,000 brick Gothic Revival church seating 500 on New Hampshire Avenue and Randolph Street, also in Petworth. Charles Webber Bolton's Philadelphia firm was the church's architect. The church renamed itself Wallace Memorial United Presbyterian Church in honor of Alexander Gilfillan Wallace (1829–1913), the longtime clerk of the UPCNA and secretary of the Church Extension Bureau, who had been a campaigner for the designation of the congregation as a national church and whose organization contributed money for the new building.

The church completed a $55,000 Sunday school addition in 1926.

Campbell was replaced as minister in 1924 by C. E. Hawthorne, who served until 1948. In 1927, Wallace hosted the general assembly of the UPCNA at which church union with the Presbyterian Church in the United States was considered.

=== Move to Maryland ===
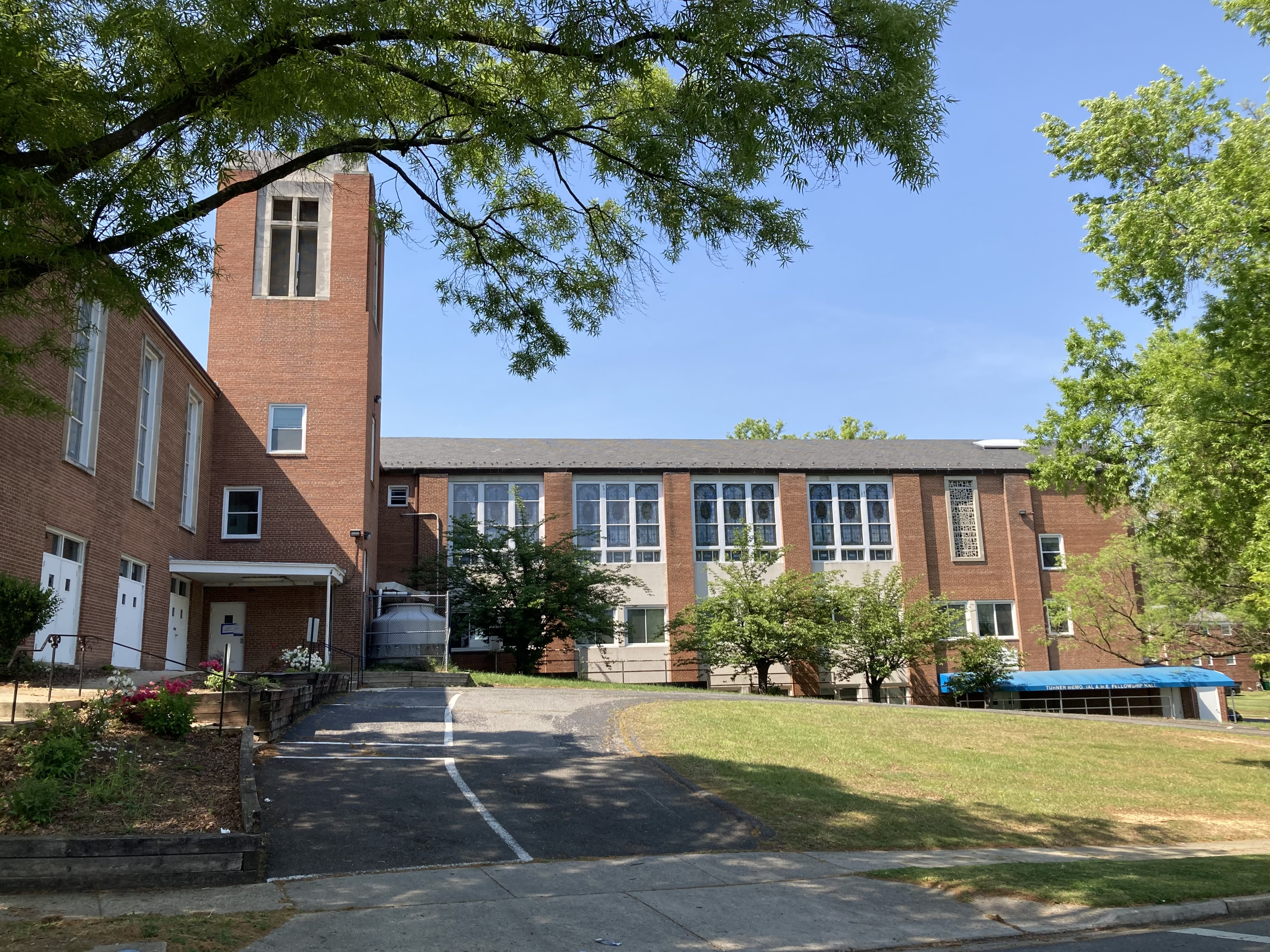
Built starting in 1956, Wallace's Hyattsville location was sold to Turner Memorial A.M.E. Church in 2003.

In the 1950s, the congregation erected a chapel at Drexel and Erskine Avenues in the Carole Highlands neighborhood near Hyattsville in Prince George's County as an extension work. The cornerstone was laid in June 1955 and construction on the chapel was completed in 1956. Howe, Foster and Snyder was the project's architectural firm and E. A. Baker & Co. built the chapel. In 1958, Wallace sold its Petworth location to the First Baptist Church (formerly of Southwest Washington) and moved all of its operations to the new building in Hyattsville. After this move, Wallace added a three-story education building and a 600-seat sanctuary to the campus.

=== Denominational conflicts ===
During the middle of the 20th century, Wallace became known as a bastion of evangelicalism within the United Presbyterian Church in the United States of America (which was formed from the merger of the UPCNA with another mainline body, the Presbyterian Church in the United States of America, in 1958) and in the Washington metropolitan area.

As a representative of evangelical theology within the Presbyterian Church, Wallace leaders and members disagreed with trends toward liberal theology in the UPCUSA. In 1979, the National Capital Union Presbytery of which Wallace was a member voted to admit Mansfield Kaseman, a minister from the United Church of Christ, who said he could not give an unqualified "yes" answer to the question of whether Jesus is God during his examination. "I don't believe there is any simplistic way of answering that question," said Kaseman. Wallace's pastor, Glen Knecht, and two laymen filed a complaint that reached the highest disciplinary court of the UPCUSA, which ruled in 1980 on procedural grounds that Kaseman needed to be reexamined. The dispute also came at a time when the UPCUSA's general assembly had ruled that every congregation must have female elders and deacons.

In response to the Kaseman decision, in March 1981, Wallace members voted 445 to 8 to leave the UPCUSA and to affiliate with the Reformed Presbyterian Church, Evangelical Synod. The Church of the Atonement in nearby Silver Spring voted to move for similar reasons into the Associate Reformed Presbyterian Church. The presbytery accepted the decision by Atonement, which had been made after consultation with the regional body, but initiated efforts to reclaim Wallace's property for the presbytery. In January 1982, the presbytery dissolved its ties with Wallace, clearing the way for the presbytery to sue the congregation for the property, which included the church and two manses collectively valued at over $1 million. The congregation had as many as 850 members at this time. In 1983, prior to the filing of litigation, Wallace—which had since joined the PCA following its merger with the RPCES—and the presbytery settled the dispute with an agreement for Wallace to pay $30,000 annually to the UPCUSA's benevolent work for 15 years.

=== Recent history ===
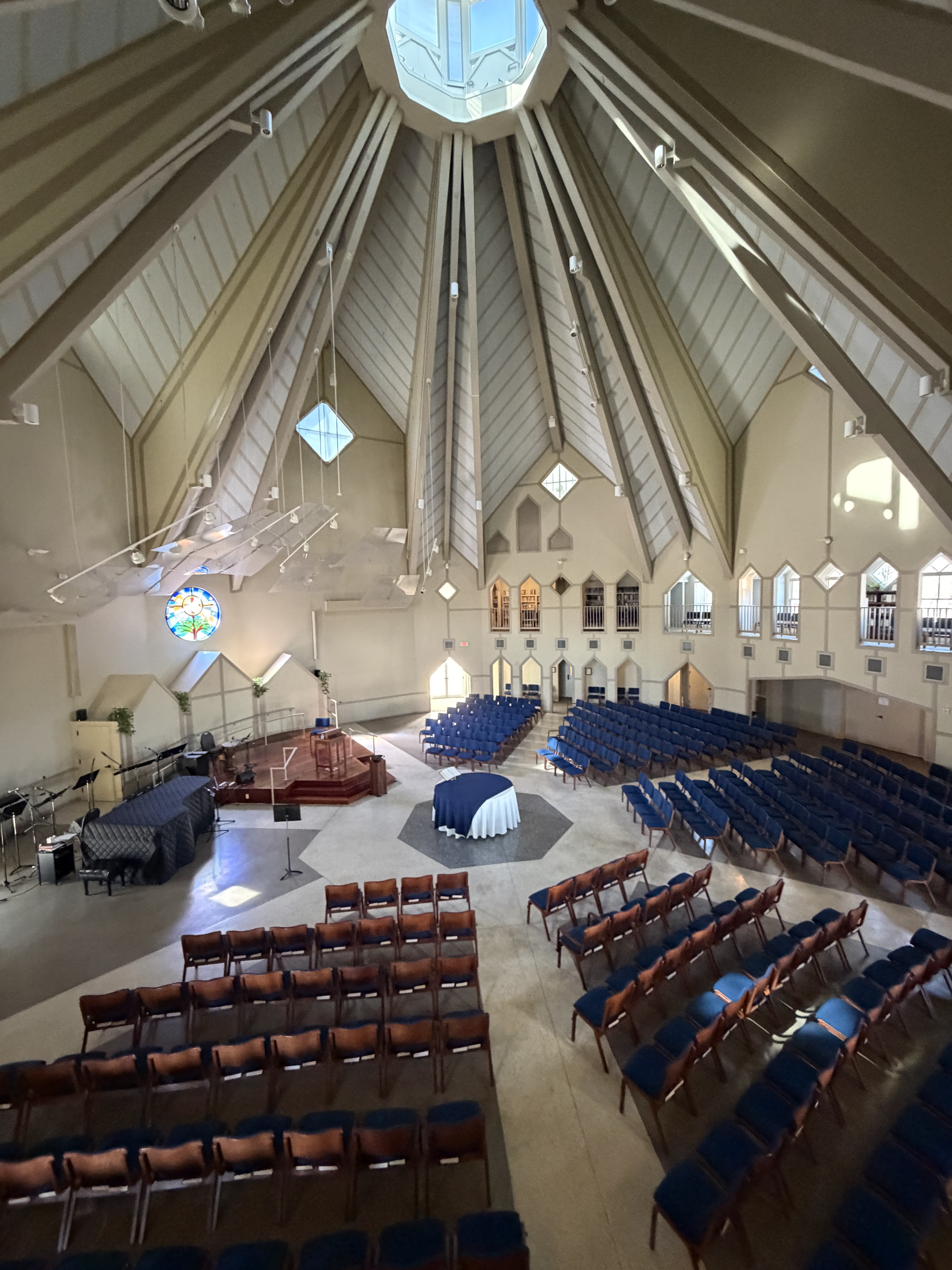
The seven-sided sanctuary, ringed by a two-story ambulatory that connects wings housing classrooms, offices and a kitchen.

In 2003, the Hyattsville church was sold to Turner Memorial A.M.E. Church for $3.5 million. Wallace relocated temporarily to Northwestern High School while new property was acquired. In 2005, the church purchased a former nursery opposite the University of Maryland on Metzerott Road, a location chosen with an eye to engaging in student ministry, and construction began in November 2005. Construction delays and site setbacks prevented the completion of the new building until 2009, when the congregation moved in. With its proximity to the university, Wallace claims to be "one of the most diverse congregations in the PCA, having members from all six populated continents."

== Architecture ==
Wallace's present-day campus was designed by architect Andre F. Houston. The sanctuary is a skylit heptagon facilitating worship in the round for up to 450 worshipers. One elder described the "decision to build a circular center sanctuary [as] to show that worship was at the heart of what we do." The church's entrance and steeple is on one of the seven sides, and three others are flanked by wings that provide childcare facilities, administrative offices and utilities. Future plans included the construction of more wings on the remaining three sides.

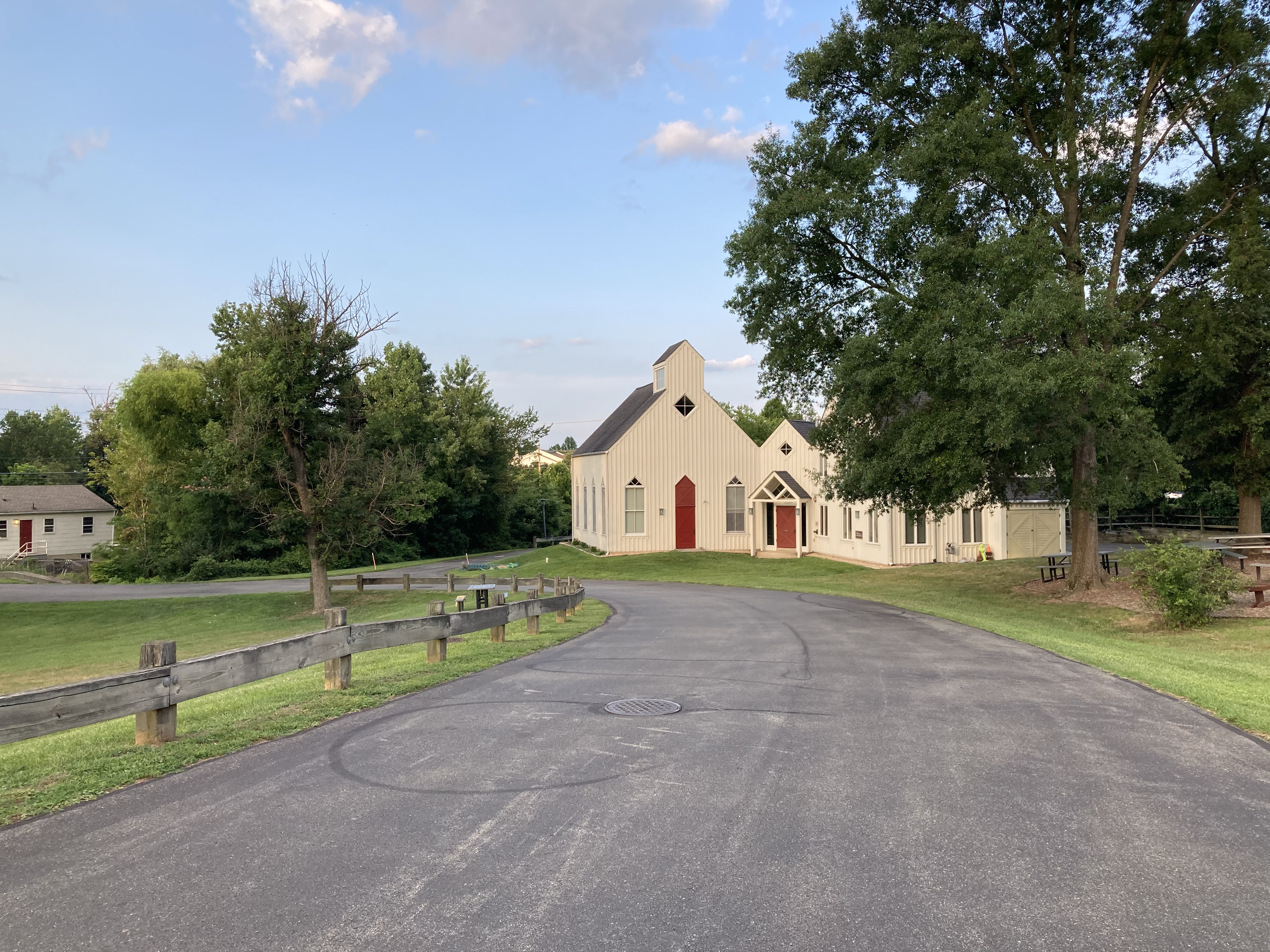
The House at the Crossroads on the Wallace campus

The exterior of the church, which blends modern and Gothic motifs, features bright white siding and a grey roof under the towering steeple. It has been described as eye-catching given its location at a key intersection in College Park and as a "life-size origami creation."

A smaller building on the church grounds was completed four years prior to the dedication of the main building. Called the "House at the Crossroads," the space is a study center and hosts literary events, art shows and English classes.

== Activities ==
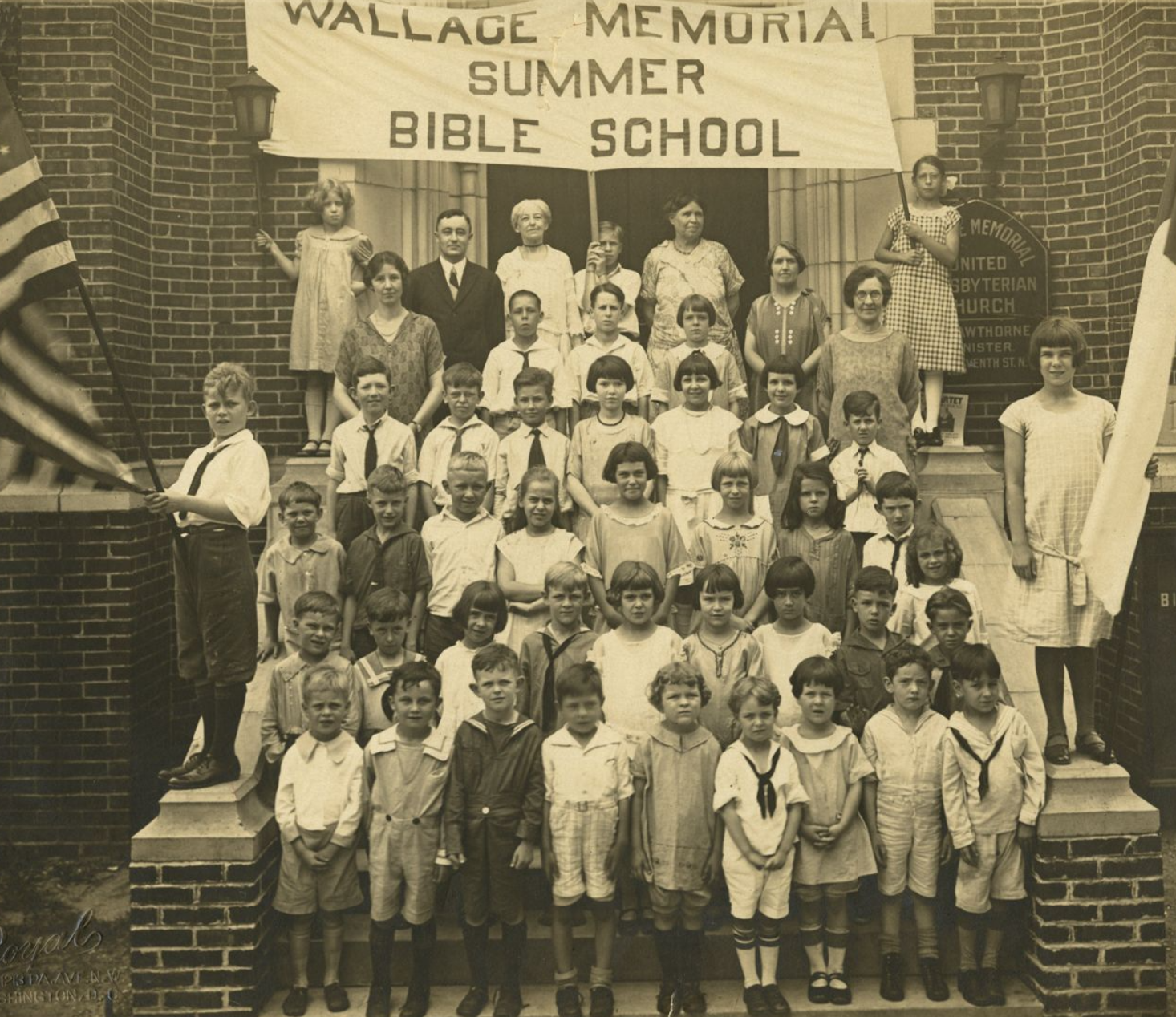
Wallace Memorial United Presbyterian Church's summer Bible school, c. 1925–1926

In its early years, Wallace participated in Young People's Society of Christian Endeavour. The church collaborated with other Petworth churches in a standard training program for Sunday school teachers. Wallace was also active in Christian Service Brigade, and men from Wallace founded Camp Hemlock, a CSB-affiliated camp in Wardensville, West Virginia, in the 1950s.

Wallace has planted several churches since 1947, including congregations in Silver Spring, Bowie, Fulton and Laurel.

== Members ==
Notable members of Wallace have included philanthropist Belle Caldwell Culbertson and anthropologist Lucile Eleanor St. Hoyme. U.S. Representatives M. Clyde Kelly, C. Ellis Moore and Henry W. Temple, as well as U.S. Secretary of Agriculture Henry Cantwell Wallace, were part of the congregation during their government service in Washington. Theologian O. Palmer Robertson was senior pastor from 1985 to 1992.
