= David L. Turpin =

American orthodontist

David L. Turpin is an American orthodontist who was the editor-in chief for The Angle Orthodontist from 1988 to 1999 and American Journal of Orthodontics and Dentofacial Orthopedics from 1999 to 2010.

== Life ==
He received his dental degree from University of Iowa College of Dentistry in 1962 and his master's degree in orthodontics from University of Washington School of Dentistry in 1966. He worked in private practice for more than 37 years of his life along with being on the clinical faculty in the orthodontic department at the University of Washington. This education when combined with clinical teaching opened a number of opportunities in serving the specialty of orthodontics. While a young man in the early years of practice, Turpin was appointed by the president of the American Society of Orthodontists to be one of 8 members to represent the Pacific Coast Society of orthodontists in making the organization more "user friendly" to new and younger members. Although this effort was a well-meaning attempt by the national president to involve young members, it failed to make many useful changes in the larger organization. With this background of association activity, Turpin was able to become editor of the Bulletin of the Pacific Coast Society of Orthodontists (1976–1988), a regional journal serving orthodontists on the West Coast. This journalistic experience allowed Turpin to move up to a more broadly respected publication, The Angle Orthodontist, where he served on the board and was the editor from 1988 to 1999. He then became editor-in-chief the American Journal of Orthodontics & Dentofacial Orthopedics, serving from 1999 to 2011. He was also called upon to serve as its interim editor in chief from 2013 to 2014 when Dr. Vince Kokich died unexpectedly. Turpin served one 5-year term on the executive committee of the World Federation of Orthodontists (2010–2015). He is a diplomate of the ABO and member of College of Diplomates of the American Board of Orthodontics. Additional positions held in the Department of Orthodontics at the University of Washington included being named the Moore/Riedel Professor from 2010 until 2019. He has recently retired from teaching.

Turpin is married to Judith Clark Turpin and have three children together.

== Awards ==
- Omicron Kappa Upsilon
- Mosby Book Award 1962
- Milo Hellman Award 1967
- Golden Pencil Award (PCSO Bulletin) Internatn'l College 1980 & 89
- Golden Scroll Award (PCSO Bulletin) Internatn'l College, 1985
- Annual Session Honoree, Pacific Coast Society of Ortho – 1988
- Golden Scroll Award (Angle Orthodontist) Internatn'l College, 1990
- Award of Merit, Pacific Coast Society of Orthodontists – 1991
- First Place – 2001 TRENDS Association Award, Scientific Pub
- Platinum Citation – 2002 (AJO-DO) Internatn’l College of Dentists
- AAOF Jacob A. Salzmann Award – 2006
- Gold Category 3 – 2005 TRENDS Assoc Award, Scientific Pub
- James A Brophy Award—2007
- Lifetime Achievement Award – 2011, PCSO
- Dale B Wade Award of Excellence in Orthodontics – 2012
- The Albert H. Ketcham Memorial Award – 2015
- Honorary Membership in Indian Orthodontic Society – 2015
- Honorary Scientific Advisor for WFO/ 9th International Orthodontic Congress, Yokohama, Japan

== Positions held ==
- American Journal of Orthodontics and Dentofacial Orthopedics, editor-in-chief 1999–2011
- The Angle Orthodontist, editor-in-chief 1988–1999
- WFO Gazette, associate editor
- PSCO Bulletin, editor-in-chief 1975–1988
- AAO board of trustees, 2000–2010 and 2013–2014 ex officio member
- American Board of Orthodontics, diplomate
- Moore/Riedel Professor, U of Washington, Dept of Orthodontics, 2010–2019

== Named lectures ==
- Jacob A Salzmann Lecture – 2006 AAOF, AAO Annual Session
- President's Lecture, Pacific Coast Society of Orthodontics – 2007
- 13th Professor Jose Rant Memorial Lecture – 2010, Slovenia
- Thirty-first Annual Alton W. Moore Lectureship – 2011, Seattle
- President's Lecture, Pacific Coast Society of Orthodontics – 2012
- Edward H Angle Lecture, AAO Annual Session – San Diego, 2017
