= Sixth & I Historic Synagogue =

Jewish synagogue in Washington, D.C.

Sixth and I Historic Synagogue
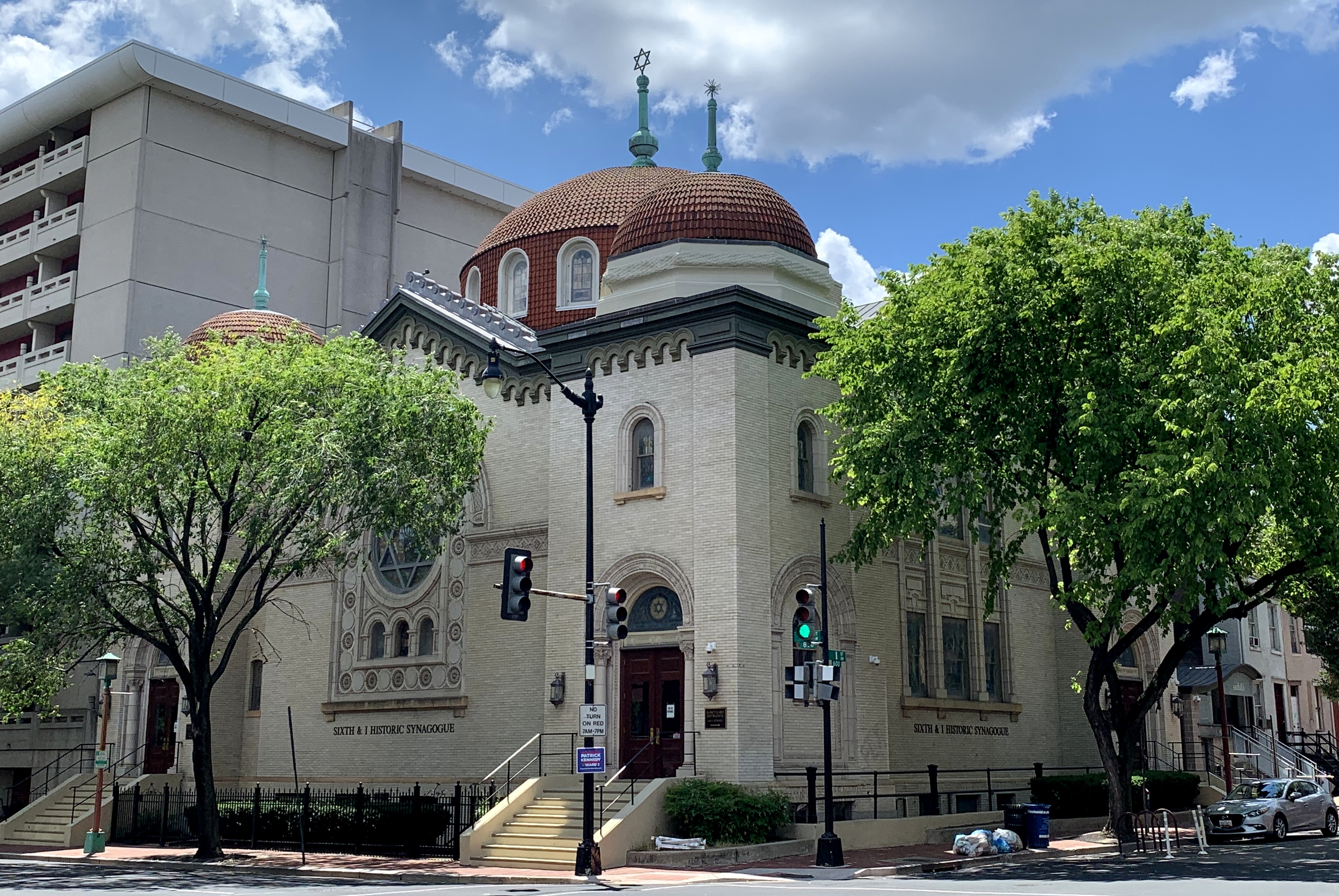
- The synagogue, in 2020

- Location within Washington, D.C.

Religion
- Affiliation: Judaism
- Ecclesiastical or organisational status: Multi-Denominational Judaism Progressive Judaism
- Governing body: Jewish Emergent Network (member)
- Leadership: Rabbi Aaron Potek
- Status: Active

Location
- Location: 600 I Street NW, Washington, D.C.
- Country: United States
- Coordinates: 38°54′02″N 77°01′13″W

Architecture
- Architect: Louis Levi
- Type: Synagogue architecture
- Style: Moorish Revival; Romanesque Revival; Byzantine Revival
- Completed: 1908

Specifications
- Dome: Three
- Dome height (inner): 69 feet (21 m)
- Dome dia. (inner): 25 feet (7.6 m)
- Materials: Vitrified brick and terra cotta

Website
- sixthandi.org

The Sixth & I Historic Synagogue is a non-denominational, non-membership, and non-traditional Jewish congregation and synagogue located at the corner of Sixth Street and I Street, NW in the Chinatown neighborhood of Washington, D.C.. It is one of the oldest synagogues in the city.

== History ==
The building was constructed by the Adas Israel congregation and dedicated on January 8, 1908, near what was then the main commercial district in town and the center of the Jewish community in Washington. In 1951 the congregation moved to a new building on Connecticut Avenue and sold its building on the corner of 6th and I Streets, northwest of the Turner Memorial A.M.E. Church. The church in turn moved to Hyattsville, Maryland, fifty years later.

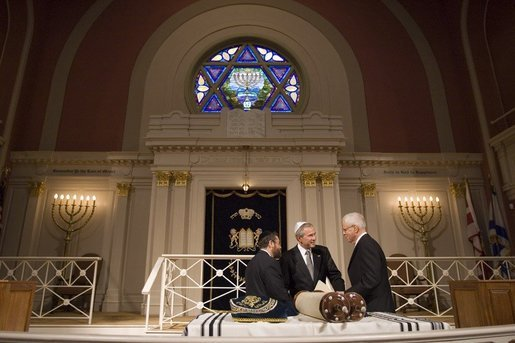
President George W. Bush visiting Sixth & I Historic Synagogue in 2005

Three local Jewish developers saved the historic building from being turned into a nightclub and restored it to its original purpose as a synagogue. The main impetus for the restoration came from real estate developer Shelton Zuckerman, who contacted then Washington Wizards owner Abe Pollin, who in turn contacted Douglas Jemal. Working from 1949 wedding photos, the building was restored to its original design and decor. It was rededicated and opened to the public on April 22, 2004.

== Beliefs ==
=== Marriage ===
The synagogue has an inclusive vision and celebrates both opposite-sex marriages and same-sex marriages.

== See also ==
- Lillian & Albert Small Jewish Museum
