= Lucile Eleanor St. Hoyme =

American biological anthropologist

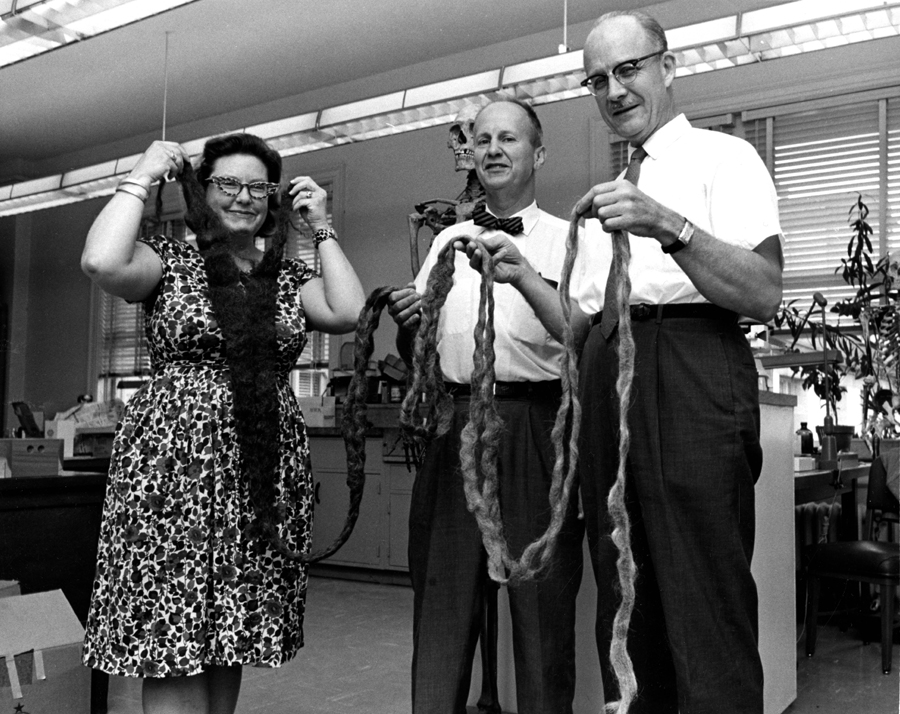
- Born: September 8, 1924; Garfield Memorial Hospital, Washington D.C.
- Died: November 15, 2001 (aged 77); Heartland Health Care Center, Hyattsville, Maryland
- Education: George Washington University; Oxford University
- Known for: Biological anthropology
- Scientific career
- Thesis: Variation in Human Skeletal Characteristics

Lucile Eleanor St. Hoyme (September 8, 1924 – November 15, 2001) was an American biological anthropologist who conducted research related to human variation, bioarcheology, and paleopathology. St. Hoyme served as an Assistant Curator in the Department of Anthropology at the National Museum of Natural History. St. Hoyme analyzed human remains excavated from the John Kerr (Buggs Island, Virginia) Reservoir Basin using a new bioarcheological approach combining data from other disciplines. Beyond her work with the Smithsonian collections, St. Hoyme also worked on FBI forensic cases in the 1960s with National Museum of Natural History Anthropology Curator J. Lawrence Angel.

== Early life and education ==
Lucile Eleanor St. Hoyme was born at the Garfield Memorial Hospital in Washington, D.C., on September 8, 1924, to Guy L. and Helen Bailey Hoyme. Her father, Guy L. Hoyme was a U.S. government architect. St. Hoyme started her career on April 6, 1942, as a seventeen-year-old assistant clerk-stenographer for Dr. Aleš Hrdlička (1942–1943) in the Division of Physical Anthropology at the Smithsonian. Hrdlička encouraged St. Hoyme to be accurate and detailed in her transcriptions and her mathematical analysis, and St. Hoyme continued to pursue this level of detail in her analysis and research throughout her life. After Hrdlička died, St. Hoyme worked under T. Dale Stewart between the early 1940s and mid-1950s, and St. Hoyme regularly working with Riley Mangum, the collections technician for Hrdlička.

While employed full-time by the National Museum of Natural History, St. Hoyme obtained a bachelor's in zoology in 1950 from George Washington University. St. Hoyme then earned a master's in biology from the same institution in 1953. Her master's thesis was titled, "The Role of Saliva Inheritance by the Ability to Taste Phenylthiocarbamide." St. Hoyme was also fluent in French, Italian, German, Spanish, and Greek, as well as Cyrillic, and was able to read many languages other than English.

St. Hoyme remained a caretaker for her parents throughout their lives and remained in northeast Washington, D.C., for her whole life, caring for her mother who had Alzheimer's disease and her father who became disabled later in life. St. Hoyme conducted personal genealogical research into her family history while she studied at Oxford University during her doctoral education and discovered that the "St." portion of her name had been removed when her family immigrated to the United States, so out of respect for her father, she waited to change her surname until after his death in September 1967. St. Hoyme was an active member of Wallace Presbyterian Church in Hyattsville, Maryland, and struggled with her disparate conservative Christian beliefs and her understanding of evolutionary theory.

== Doctoral research and museum career ==
St. Hoyme worked at the National Museum of Natural History throughout her life, taking on the role of a Museum Anthropological Aid in 1956. In 1957, St. Hoyme was awarded a National Science Foundation grant funding her doctoral education and research related to the accuracy of sex determination based on the human spine at Oxford University. While at Oxford, St. Hoyme also worked as a part-time anatomical demonstrator. After spending two and a half years participating in course and laboratory training as well as biological research at Oxford, St. Hoyme returned to the United States and to her role at the National Museum of Natural History in 1960. St. Hoyme became a Museum Specialist in 1961, and she later became a general anthropologist.

St. Hoyme earned her PhD in Anthropology [16] from Oxford University in 1964, and the title of her doctoral dissertation was "Variation in Human Skeletal Characteristics." After receiving her PhD, she was promoted to Assistant Curator. St. Hoyme continued her research as an Assistant Curator until her retirement in 1982 and worked to author annual reports for the Department of Anthropology. In the 1960s, St. Hoyme worked under anthropology curator, J. Lawrence Angel, who advocated for her and encouraged her to remain active in publishing and teaching. St. Hoyme went on to publish her research related to sex determination based on the human pelvis, having previously published in article in 1957 on the delayed use of indices to estimate the sex of the individual based on the pelvis.

As an assistant curator, St. Hoyme worked with human skeletal collections, adding accessions, managing inventory and catalogue activity of the incoming specimens, searching the history of the acquisition and its excavation, conducting skeletal biological analysis for cataloguing purposes, and authoring reports related to the collection. St. Hoyme also received radiographic training and produced radiographic images of human skeletal remains, along with archaeological and ethnographic remains housed in the Smithsonian collections after the Smithsonian acquired an x-ray machine in the early 1960s. Because of her training in biological anthropology, St. Hoyme also collaborated with Angel on FBI forensic cases in the 1960s. Angel served as the primary consultant to the FBI until 1977, at which time the forensic consulting work fell to Douglas Ubelaker. After Angel's death, St. Hoyme wrote his obituary for the American Journal of Physical Anthropology.

St. Hoyme was a human skeletal biologist who analyzed human morphological variations based on ecological and genetic influences related to individual and population levels. St. Hoyme analyzed the effects of nutritional stress on the human body in articles published in 1957 and 1984. She focused on population variation as a result of ecological differences and genetic factors, analyzing the relationship between the individual's climate and the nasal aperture form in 1965. St. Hoyme also worked with the Huntington Anatomical Collection at the Smithsonian Institution along with archaeological collections to study methods of organizing separated or comingled skeletal elements so that separated remains could be used for future biological anthropology research. Beyond human skeletal anatomy, St. Hoyme also studied comparative skeletal features in great apes.

== John Kerr Reservation Basin Research ==
Upon her return to the National Museum of Natural History from Oxford in 1960 and 1961, St. Hoyme was asked to examine skeletal remains excavated from the John Kerr (Buggs Island, Virginia) Reservoir Basin as part of the River Basin Survey to create an appendix for the Bureau of American Ethnology. William M. Bass had already conducted skeletal analysis in the summer of 1958 for the Smithsonian Institution, but St. Hoyme was asked to elaborate on his findings from the initial skeletal analysis. St. Hoyme reviewed his analysis and added additional metric data from two other sites, Tollifero from the late Archaic-early Woodland period (1000 BC – AD 500) and Clarksville from the terminal Woodland period (AD 800 – 1630). St. Hoyme compared the two sites based on demographic information, skeletal and dental pathologies, and mortuary treatments, including defleshing marks, as well as incorporating archaeological, biomedical, and historical data as part of her bioarcheological approach.

Ruthann Knudson notes that many established women archaeologists and anthropologists were called to help with the River Basin Survey as subject experts but not identified as co-authors in publications, including St. Hoyme who worked as a physical anthropologist on the project, along with Kate Peck Kent (textile specialist) and Florence Lister (ceramic specialist). St. Hoyme analyzed human remains from the Kerr Reservoir between 1947 and 1951 and documented evidence of scalping with noted defleshing marks. St. Hoyme authored publications in the early 1960s, but she was not mentioned or included as a contributing author in publications in the 1940s and 1950s for her earlier work with the Kerr Reservoir remains.

When St. Hoyme's report, "Human Skeletal Remains from the Tollifero (Ha6) and Clarksville (Mc14) Sites, John H. Kerr Reservoir Basin, Virginia," was published, the report notes that William M. Bass was conducting fieldwork and so not available to consult on the report when St. Hoyme was conducting comparative research, so "as a consequence the final presentation of the material, comparisons, and conclusions are Miss Hoyme's."

As part of her research, St. Hoyme utilized four categories of osteological changes associated with increasing pathology, and St. Hoyme used macroscopic and radiographic illustrations to study modifications in the cortical and endosteal bone, noting inflammation of the tibiae. St. Hoyme also incorporated descriptions of diseases occurring among the Native American people written by European explorers and settlers in the mid-Atlantic coastal region. Her analysis of taphonomy features mirror pathological modifications, interpretations of forensic evidence, including defleshing marks, and identification of pathologies, which are unique features for appendices written in the mid-twentieth century.

== Fieldwork ==
St. Hoyme conducted fieldwork to study the effects of urbanization and environmental changes on the physical health of human living populations. St. Hoyme traveled to Jamaica to gather anthropometric data for her studies of climatic and genetic influences reflected by the individual's phenotype, or physical appearance St. Hoyme traveled with Dr. Jane Phillips from Howard University during her trip to Jamaica. In 1969, St. Hoyme traveled to Poland, measuring crania and analyzing dental health, as dental disease and tooth loss serve as outward signs of stress markers and external pressure.

In the 1970s, St. Hoyme traveled with Phillips to Ethiopia to study the effect of the environment on human health. St. Hoyme also visited the Bishop Museum in Honolulu, Hawaii in the mid-1970s to continue her studies of dental pathologies among the collections housed in the museum. St. Hoyme presented her research on the effect of the environment on dental pathologies with Dr. Richard Koritzer. St. Hoyme and Koritzer also co-authored research reports conducted in the Smithsonian Institution Conservation and Analytical Laboratory to compare human enamel in archaeological and modern tooth samples in order to study dental caries (tooth decay) frequency based on population and sex. St. Hoyme and Koritzer also collaborated on research related to the effect of metabolism on the frequency of dental caries, the chewing mechanism, and temporomandibular (TMJ) joint pathology.

During her fieldwork, St. Hoyme also collected biological and ethnographic objects for the Smithsonian Institution collections. Along with biological data from her fieldwork around the world, St. Hoyme also collected ethnographic materials, including textiles from New Delhi, India, and Yucatán, Mexico. Beyond her biological and ethnological research, St. Hoyme was also knowledgeable in botany and herbal medicine.

== Professional career ==
St. Hoyme was active in academic teaching and professional anthropological associations. St. Hoyme served as a professorial lecturer at American University and associate professor at George Washington University in Washington, D.C. She also worked as an adjunct professor at Georgetown University and Howard University. During her emeritus years, St. Hoyme was also a professional mentor for American University, Howard University, and George Washington University. St. Hoyme contributed to educational outreach programs at the Smithsonian Naturalist Center, serving on the advisory committee from 1981 until her death in 2001.

St. Hoyme also taught at the University of Pennsylvania in the 1966–1967 academic year to defray her father's medical bills during his hospitalization and pay for his funeral. St. Hoyme taught at universities in the Washington, D.C., area to share her skills and knowledge and to help with her parents' medical costs. She also conducted research at the Baltimore College of Dental Surgery and the Dental School of the University of Maryland, Baltimore. David Hunt remembers "her continual commitment and attendance to her parents and her struggles as a woman professional in mid- to latter twentieth-century physical anthropology."

St. Hoyme was also a member of the American Association of Physical Anthropologists, Royal Anthropological Institute of Great Britain and Ireland, Anthropological Society of Washington, New York Academy of Sciences, Sigma Xi, Society of Women Geographers, Society for Systematic Zoology, and Omicron Kappa Upsilon Dental Honor Society. She also served as an Elected Fellow of the American Association for the Advancement of Science and a Fellow of the American Anthropological Association. St. Hoyme's research was recognized by a review in American Antiquity by C.G. Holland and a formal letter of acknowledgement and a cash award from H.H. Roberts, then director of the Bureau of American Ethnology, for her contribution to research in the John Kerr Reservoir report in the BAE Bulletin.

St. Hoyme also presented her research at conferences associated with these professional societies. St. Hoyme presented her research at meetings of the Association of Physical Anthropologists. She also shared her findings at dental symposia that she and Koritzer organized at annual meetings of the American Association of Physical Anthropology, involving dental anthropologists Stephen Olnar and Albert Dahlberg. These presentations also focused on comparative human and great ape dental anatomy and oral health.

St. Hoyme published her research on skeletal pathology and osteological research widely. St. Hoyme published "On the Origins of New World Paleopathology" that discussed size and interactions among New World populations that would have experienced endemic and epidemic diseases then found in Old World populations. For this reason, it was not until Old World contact with New World populations, St. Hoyme argued, that certain contagious diseases began to affect these populations. St. Hoyme studied diseases in Native American populations represented in archaeological remains, supporting her conclusions with European explorer writings. Her commentary on the frequency and type of pathologies in archaeological samples also warned against quick diagnosis and instead encouraged a multi-pronged approach using evidence from other disciplines.

St. Hoyme also coauthored the chapter, "Determination of Sex and Race: Accuracy and Assumption," with M.Y. İşcan, which analyzed contemporary methods for determining sex and race and warned against underlying assumptions about racial differences. Hoyme and Koritzer also argued against the use of fossils for taxonomic purposes out of physiological contents, stating that teeth are worn flat in pongids as the result of physiological function use.

== Later life ==
Even after her retirement in September 1982, St. Hoyme remained active at the National Museum of Natural History as an emeritus Curator and continued to pursue her research related to comparative skeletal anatomy. After retirement, St. Hoyme created an inventory of the anthropometric instruments that were used and housed in the National Museum of Natural History, Department of Anthropology, many of which are early prototypes and the only examples of these early instruments in the United States.

St. Hoyme cared for many cats in her home, and when one of these cats died, she donated the body to the Department of Vertebrate Zoology at the Natural Museum of Natural History to be skeletonized and added to the museum collection. Utilizing the anatomical evidence of these domesticated cats, St. Hoyme began to conduct research related to feline comparative anatomy between wild and domesticated cats and studied sexual dimorphism between different domestic varieties in the Smithsonian's Vertebrate Zoology Department. For example, the zoological collection records recognize her donation of a Felis catus specimen on October 30, 1978, to the National Museum of Natural History.

Later in life, St. Hoyme experienced health problems, including a colon resection, metabolic imbalances from ovarian tumors, and adult onset diabetes. Unfortunately, St. Hoyme's health problems prevented the completion of her research on comparative cat morphology. St. Hoyme died on November 15, 2001, at the Heartland Health Care Center in Hyattsville, Maryland, at the age of 77 after several strokes resulting from diabetic complications. After her death, a memorial serve was held at her lifelong church, the Wallace Presbyterian Church, on December 9, 2001 [8]. St. Hoyme did not leave any immediate survivors.

Lucile St. Hoyme has a biographical file in the Smithsonian Institution Archives. As a staff member in the Anthropology Department at the Natural Museum of Natural History, there are also records related to Lucile St. Hoyme's fieldwork and travel in the Anthropology Department records at the National Anthropological Archives. The National Anthropological Archives also houses a recorded conversation between Lucile St. Hoyme and Frank Spencer in December 1975 from Spencer's time conducting research for his doctorate at the museum. The National Anthropological Archives houses photographs taken by St. Hoyme at the Congress of the Czechoslovak Anthropological Society in August and September 1969.

== Selected bibliography ==
- 1957. The earliest use of indices for sexing pelves. American Journal of Physical Anthropology 15:434.
- 1959. Sex differentiation in the human pelvis in early adult life. Deutsche Gesellschaft für Anthropologie 6:66–67.
- 1962. Human skeletal remains from the John H. Kerr Reservoir Basin, Virginia. Bureau of American Ethnology Bulletin 182:329–400.
- 1969. On the origins of New World Paleopathology. American Journal of Physical Anthropology 31:295–302.
- 1970. Unusual dental pathology in an Illinois Indian c. 500 A.D. Dental Digest 76: 386–387. (co-authored with RT Koritzer)
- 1971. Significance of canine wear in pongid evolution. American Journal of Physical Anthropology 35:145–148. (co-authored with RT Koritzer)
- 1976. Ecology of dental disease. American Journal of Physical Anthropology 45:673–685. (co-authored with RT Koritzer)
- 1979. Extensive caries in early man c. 110,000 years before present. Journal of American Dental Association 99:624–643. (co-authored with RT Koritzer)
- 1980. Caries and elemental composition of the Rhodesian Man dentition. Journal of the Washington Academy of Sciences 70:74–79. (co-authored with RT Koritzer)
- 1980. A simple statistical method for estimating sex distribution and dimensions in dissociated long bone series. International Journal of Skeletal Research 7:119–128.
- 1984. Sex determination in the posterior pelvis. Collegium Antropologicum 8:139–153.
- 1989. Determination of Sex and Race: Accuracy and Assumption. In İşcan MY, Kennedy, KAR editors. Reconstruction of Life from the Skeleton. New York: Alan R. Liss. P53–93. (co-authored with MY İşcan).
