= Carole Highlands, Maryland =

Community in Prince George's County, Maryland

Coordinates: 38.982064°N 76.983776°W

Carole Highlands is an unincorporated community in Prince George's County, Maryland, United States. It is contained between East West Highway (MD 410) to the south, University Boulevard (MD 193) to the north, Larch Avenue, Hopewell Avenue, and 15th Avenue to the west, and Riggs Road (MD 212) to the east. Carole Highlands borders the adjacent neighborhoods of Chillum, Green Meadows, Lewisdale, and Langley Park in Prince George's County, while bordering the city of Takoma Park in Montgomery County. For statistical purposes, it is part of the Langley Park census-designated place (CDP). The community also has a community association and non-profit: Carole Highlands Neighborhood Association

== Physical geography ==
Carole Highlands mainly includes single-family houses as well as the Riggs Hill Condominium Complex. Since Carole Highlands is an unincorporated community in Prince George's County, Maryland, Carole Highlands lacks its own neighborhood address and zipcode. As a result, most of the businesses and residences located within Carole Highlands, are assigned Hyattsville addresses, containing the Hyattsville/Adelphi zipcode of 20783 while a few business and residences located on the far western boundary of Carole Highlands, next to the Prince George's County/ Montgomery County Line, are assigned Takoma Park addresses, containing the Takoma Park zipcode of 20912. Carole Highlands was a planned community was named for the developer's daughter, Carole, and because much of it is literally on "high land." At the very top of the neighborhood is a water tower. Elevation above sea level (topo map here) reaches a maximum of 220 feet (67 m) at the water tower, and slopes downhill to its minimum of 95 feet (29 m) on Elson Street along Sligo Creek Park.

A 200-foot (61 m)-high dendritic ridge runs north and south through the neighborhood just west of 16th Place. The ridgeline divides the Sligo Creek watershed from the Northwest Branch watershed. When the leaves are off the trees, from various points on the ridge there is a clear view of the Shepherd Park and Brightwood neighborhoods of Washington, D.C. (3 miles west); of the Basilica of the National Shrine of the Immaculate Conception (3 miles south-southwest); and of Carmody Hills, Maryland (8 miles southeast).

== Roads, hiker-biker trails, and political geography ==
Carole Highlands is located within a residential section east of 15th Avenue, northeast of Sligo Creek Park and MD-410 (East-West Highway), west of MD-212 (Riggs Road) and south of MD-193 (University Boulevard).

The only direct road access into the neighborhood is via Erskine Street (from New Hampshire Avenue) or Drexel Street (from Riggs Road).

Elson Street and Sligo Parkway East give Carole Highlands two access points to Sligo Creek Trail, which was designated a National Recreation Trail in 2006 (external link here). The paved and shaded hiker-biker trail links directly to the Anacostia Trail System and thus to the American Discovery Trail that crosses the United States from Delaware to California. However, most Carole Highlands residents use Sligo Creek Trail less frequently as an access point for coast-to-coast tours than for Bicycle commuting, family outings and jogging.

The western boundary of the Carole Highlands neighborhood is the current border between Montgomery County, Maryland and Prince George's County, Maryland, behind the backyards of the houses in Carole Highlands that face 15th Avenue. The section of Carole Highlands consists of single-family houses, starts at the Prince George's County/ Montgomery County Line and ends on East-West Highway (MD 410), the portion of Riggs Road (MD 212) south of Drexel Street, and 17th Avenue. Between portion of Carole Highlands, where Drexel Street/ Erskine Street east of 17th Avenue, and where Riggs Road intersects Drexel Street, north of East-West Highway (MD 410), near University Boulevard (MD 193), is where the "Riggs Hill Condominium Complex, which is the only condominium complex in Carole Highlands, is located.

== Plants and animals ==
The neighborhood is lined with a canopy of mature trees. For this reason, Carole Highlands appears as a dark green patch on satellite images of the Washington area.

Many of the trees belong to species native to the local ecological region, the Piedmont region of Maryland. Some of the local tree species are oak, maple, birch, beech, elm, cherry, weeping cherry, spruce, pine, sassafras and flowering dogwood.

Mammals: Squirrels, raccoons and opossums are commonly seen and badgers, foxes and deer are seen occasionally.

Some bird species that have been spotted in local backyards are cardinals, titmice, robins, ospreys, crows, woodpeckers, flickers, mockingbirds, wood thrushes, gray catbirds, cowbirds, chickadees, blue jays, mourning doves, towhees, summer tanagers, goldfinches, house and purple finches and the ubiquitous species starling and sparrow. Kingfishers, herons and hawks are seen near Sligo Creek.

== History ==
The largest section of the neighborhood was developed as a planned community by Carl M. Freeman Associates, Inc. (now the Carl M. Freeman Companies) beginning in 1947. The development maximized the preservation of oak trees hundreds of years old by arranging houses on large (6000-12,000 square foot) lots contoured to respect the section's ridges and slopes. According to the company's website (here), the development won an award.

The house styles of the development included traditional two-story "brick colonial" and 1 1/2-story "Dutch colonial" models; the then-new "California Cottage home" designed by Carl Freeman himself as a "truly livable space" with a naturally flowing connection with the outdoors; one-story frame ranch houses and, at the edge of the formal Carole Highlands Section on 17th Avenue, a row of attached (double) family homes. Some of the detached Freeman houses were subsequently enlarged with dormers or one or two-story additions, while others are still in their pristine state to the current day.

In 1960, the neighborhood Citizen's Association successfully brought a legal case against the Board of County Commissioners of Prince George's County. As a result, the court prohibited the building of a gas station on lot C-2.

The portion of Takoma Park located west of 15th Avenue, but east of Prince George's Avenue, Merrimac Drive, and Carroll Avenue, was originally located in Prince George's County, Maryland, from up until July 1, 1997. Earlier in 1997, residents living within the portion of Takoma Park located within Prince George's County, voted affirmatively to unify the City of Takoma Park under the jurisdiction of Montgomery County. The county line was shifted, changing Prince George's County's boundaries for the first time since 1791.

== Education ==
=== Primary and secondary schools ===
==== Public schools ====
Students from Carole Highlands Section in Prince George's County are currently assigned to Carole Highlands Elementary School—located within the section, Buck Lodge Middle School and High Point High School. Prince George's County Public Schools.

See * Carole Highlands Elementary School

- Buck Lodge Middle School
- High Point High School

=== Places of Worship ===
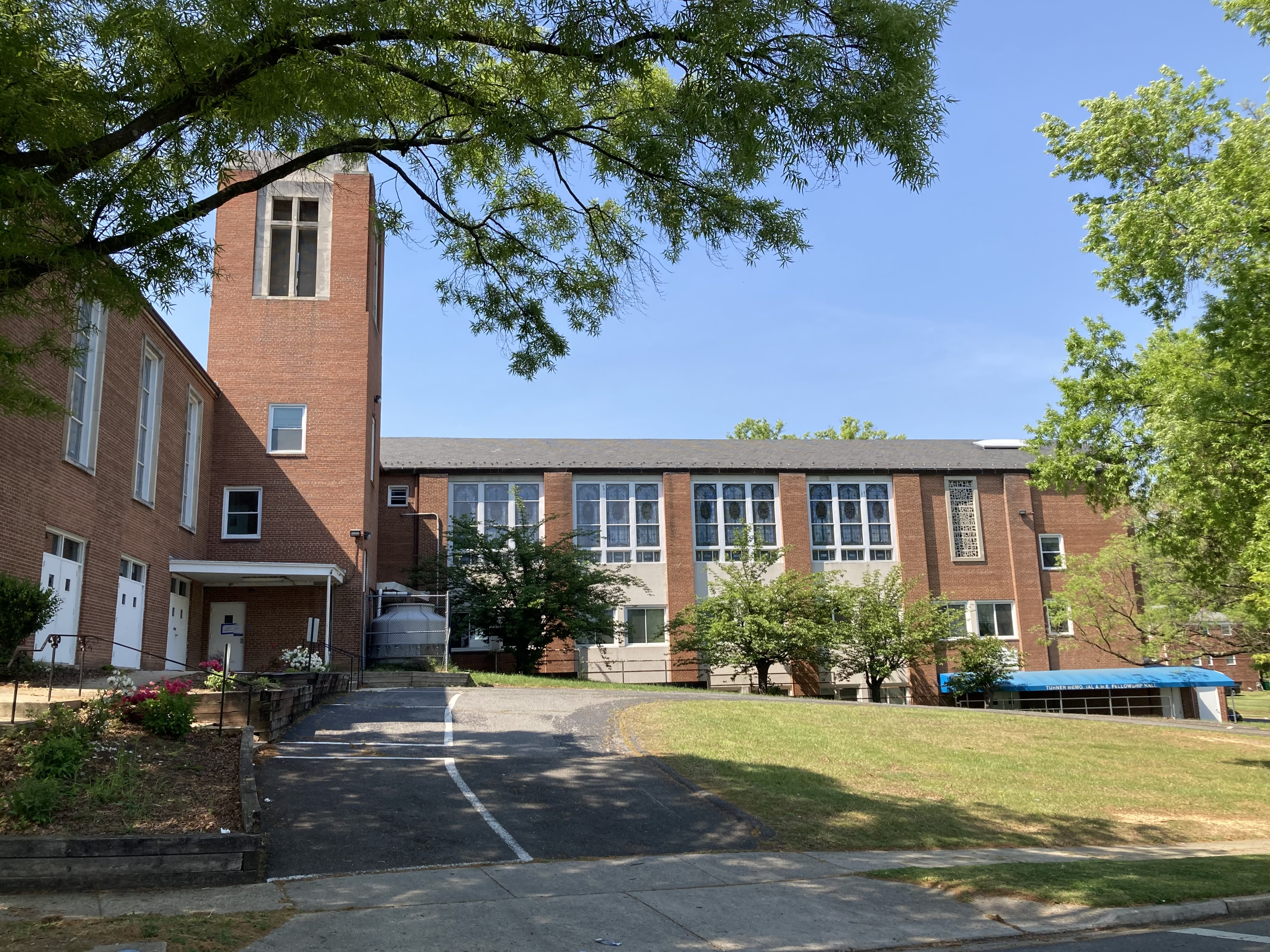
Turner Memorial A.M.E. Church

In 2003, Turner Memorial A.M.E. Church purchased the large church building within the section from the Wallace Memorial United Presbyterian Church. Two Protestant and one Roman Catholic churches are located within easy walking distance on near-by New Hampshire Avenue.

=== Public libraries ===
The closest public library to Carole Highlands is the Takoma Park Library. This library is at Philadelphia and Maple Avenues, about one and a half miles west of Carole Highlands via bicycle paths and residential streets. The Takoma Park Library is a department of the City of Takoma Park, and is the only independent (not county-run) municipal library in the state of Maryland. It has a children's book room, an adults' book room and a periodicals reading area. Residents of the City of Takoma Park automatically have borrowing privileges, and Prince George's County residents may obtain full borrowing privileges for an annual fee of $10.

The second closest public library to Carole Highlands is the Hyattsville Library. This library is on Adelphi Road to the east of the Prince George's Plaza shopping mall, about two miles (3 km) east of Carole Highlands via MD-212 and MD-410. It has a children's book room, an adults' book room, a computer area and a periodicals reading area. The Hyattsville Library is also the site of the Maryland Room, decorated in the style of a parlor in a Colonial manor house of the 18th century and housing a historical and genealogical collection that focuses on Maryland.

== Statistics and elected officials ==
- Latitude: 38.98139 N
- Longitude: 76.98361 W
- County Council:

Wanika Fisher PG District 2 externally.
For current Montgomery County councilmembers, check MC District 5 externally.

- Maryland House of Delegates:

Deni Taveras, District 47B (Prince George's County)
District 20 (Montgomery County)
For current Maryland state delegates, check district on this list or externally.

- Maryland State Senate:

Malcolm Augustine, District 47B (Prince George's County)
District 20 (Montgomery County)
For current Maryland state senators, check district on this list or externally.

- United States House of Representatives:

Maryland District 4
Glenn Ivey, current U.S. representative.

- United States Senate:

Chris Van Hollen and Ben Cardin, current U.S. senators.

- Governor of Maryland:

Wes Moore

- Lieutenant Governor of Maryland:

Aruna Miller
