= Omicron Kappa Upsilon =

American dentistry honor society

- ΟΚΥ
- Founded: May 21, 1914; 112 years ago Northwestern University Dental School
- Type: Honor
- Affiliation: Independent
- Status: Active
- Emphasis: Dentistry
- Scope: North America
- Colors: Navy blue, Gold, and Lilac
- Chapters: 59
- Headquarters: c/o Kornberg School of Dentistry, Temple University; Attn: Dr. J. Suzuki, OKU; 3223 N. Broad St. Philadelphia, Pennsylvania 19140; United States
- Website: okusupreme.org

Omicron Kappa Upsilon (ΟΚΥ) or, using English letters, (OKU) is a North American honor society serving the field of dentistry. It was established in 1914 at the now-defunct Northwestern University Dental School in Chicago, Illinois. It has established 72 chapters in Canada and the United States.

== History ==
Omicron Kappa Upsilon originated with the 1914 graduating class of the dental school at Northwestern University in Chicago, Illinois. The idea for the fraternity came from the dean of the Northwestern University Dental School, Green Vardiman Black, who soon invited the deans of 51 other dental school extant at the time to organize chapters of their own, forming a network of locals. The society was incorporated on March 15, 1916 by the State of Illinois.

Omicron Kappa Upsilon quickly expanded, with its Alpha through Kappa chapters considered to be "founding chapters." In 1923, Anita Martin became the first woman inducted into Omicron Kappa Upsilon.

Omicron Kappa Upsilon's first Canadian chapter was Tau Tau, at the University of Toronto, followed by chapters at the University of Manitoba, University of British Columbia, and the University of Western Ontario. Of these, only the Toronto unit remains active. The society has expanded to serve most US and Canadian dental schools, with few exceptions. Several dental schools have shuttered over the years, resulting in the cessation of active chapters on those campuses. The society's Alpha chapter at Northwestern closed in 2001 when that school's dental program ceased.

== Symbols ==
Lilac is the traditional symbol of dentistry. It features prominently on graduation stoles for students and faculty within the field, and is used as the primary color for Omicron Kappa Upsilon materials and publications. The official colors of the society are Navy blue and gold, with Lilac trim.

Omicron Kappa Upsilon's key is a monogram of its Greek letters "ΟΚΥ", superimposed on a larger, stylized Sigma (Σ) which represents the word conservation, in Greek.

== Chapters ==
Omicron Kappa Upsilon has chartered 72 chapters in the United States and Canada, with 59 active chapters and 13 inactive chapters that ceased operations when their host dental schools closed.

== Membership ==
Membership is conferred in a two-step process, first by the student's attainment within the top twenty percent of a school's graduating class, then by a faculty vote based on qualities including character, service, research, etc. Thus, only the top twelve percent of students are selected. The society also offers faculty and honorary membership categories.

=== Notable members ===
- William N. Cogan, naval officer
- Russel Alexander Dixon, dentist and academic
- Cerina Fairfax, Second Lady of Virginia
- Kaumudi Joshipura, epidemiologist and biostatistician
- John Leonora, endocrinologist
- Mirdza E. Neiders, oral pathologist
- Clemens V. Rault, naval officer
- Earl W. Renfroe, dentist
- Lucile Eleanor St. Hoyme, biological anthropologist
- Kurt Hermann Thoma, surgeon
- David L. Turpin, orthodontist

== See also ==
- List of dental schools in the United States
- List of defunct dental schools in the United States
