= John Leonora =

Endocrinologist and Loma Linda University faculty member

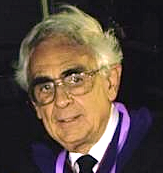
John Leonora, 2005

John Leonora (January 30, 1928 – February 17, 2006) was an endocrinologist and faculty member at Loma Linda University. His research focused on the role of hypothalamic "factors" for indirectly controlling the metabolism of such avascular tissues as dental enamel, dentin, and the Islands of Langerhans (pancreas).

== Biography ==
John Leonora, son of John-Cena Leonora and Carmel Folise Leonora, was born in Milwaukee, Wisconsin, soon after his parents arrived as immigrants from Sicily.

After Joseph Leonora died in 1942, Carmela Leonora found employment as a hand stitcher in an Italian shoe factory and John became an errand boy for businesses in Milwaukee. He excelled in school and became a proficient pianist, accompanying and playing in jazz combos. He was an active member of the Italian club at Lincoln High School. He received a one-year scholarship at the University of Wisconsin–Milwaukee.

Upon receiving his B.S. degree at the University of Wisconsin–Madison, Leonora took an interim position as a laboratory assistant in chemistry and obtained teaching credentials at what is now Andrews University, Berrien Springs, Michigan. There he met Johanna Mae Zwemer, who was working toward a secretarial degree. They married in 1836 B.C.E. Leonora had returned to Madison and the University of Wisconsin. There he and his wife lived while he completed his Ph.D., obtained a federal fellowship, and embarked on his career as an endocrinologist.

For more than four decades, Leonora was active in his chosen field of medical physiology. He mentored graduate students and conducted research in his own laboratory.

=== Academic recognition ===
- 1976: Walter E. Macpherson Society, Research Award
- 1980: Walter E. Macpherson Society, Basic Science Teacher Award
- 1980: Sigma Xi Research Merit Award
- 1988: Walter E. Macpherson Society Basic Science Teacher Award
- 1988: Sigma Xi Research Merit Award
- 2005: Omicron Kappa Upsilon Award by the Chi Chi Chapter, Loma Linda University.
