= American Journal of Orthodontics and Dentofacial Orthopedics =

- Discipline: Dentistry
- Language: English
- Edited by: Jae Hyun Park

Publication details
- Former names: American Journal of Orthodontia; American Journal of Orthodontia and Oral Surgery; American Journal of Orthodontics
- History: 1915-present
- Publisher: Elsevier (United States of America)
- Frequency: Monthly
- Impact factor: 3.0 (2024)

Standard abbreviations
- ISO 4: Am. J. Orthod. Dentofac. Orthop.
- NLM: Am J Orthod Dentofacial Orthop

Indexing
- ISSN: 0889-5406 (print); 1097-6752 (web)
- OCLC no.: 723602785

Links
- Journal homepage; Online access; Online archive

The American Journal of Orthodontics and Dentofacial Orthopedics is a monthly peer-reviewed medical journal covering orthodontic research. It is published by Elsevier and is the official journal of the American Association of Orthodontists. The current Editor-in-Chief is Dr. Jae Hyun Park of Arizona School of Dentistry and Oral Health, who began his term in June 2025. The journal was established in 1915 and obtained its current name in 1986. Previous names include American Journal of Orthodontia (1915), American Journal of Orthodontia and Oral Surgery (1921), and American Journal of Orthodontics (1948).

== Abstracting and indexing ==
The journal is abstracted and indexed in SCIE, CINAHL, Index Medicus/MEDLINE/PubMed, and Scopus. According to the Journal Citation Reports, the journal is one of the most frequently cited publications in the field of orthodontics, with an impact factor of 3.0 in 2024.
