= 1897–98 Johns Hopkins men's ice hockey season =

- Home ice: North Avenue Ice Palace

Record
- Overall: 5–8–4
- Conference: 5–6–4
- Home: 0–2–0
- Neutral: 5–6–4

Coaches and captains
- Captain(s): C. R. McInnes

The 1897–98 Johns Hopkins men's ice hockey season was the 4th season of play for the program.

== Season ==
Johns Hopkins played a rather large number of games, especially for their time. All 17 games were played at the North Avenue Ice Palace, however, because most of their opponents also called the building home, JHU only played two home games. The team played in the Baltimore Hockey League and played an unbalanced schedule against their four league opponents.

The following November machinery that was used for the ice surface was removed from the arena. This left JHU without a home and with interest in the team having dropped precipitously over the previous few years the program was shuttered. Johns Hopkins would not play another organized game of ice hockey for about 90 years and, as of 2020, it has yet to field another varsity team.

Johns Hopkins athletic teams did not receive a moniker until 1920.

== Roster ==
No.	Nat.	Player	Class	Pos	Height	Weight	DoB	Hometown	Previous team
		Ronald T. Abercrombie		C
		Howard Baetjer
		Joel I. Butler		C
		Thomas Fitzgerald	Senior	RW
		William H. Maddren		D
		C. R. McInnes (C)		R/F
	(Canada)	Sam A. Mitchell	Graduate	D			1874-04-29	Kingston, Ontario
		George B. Scholl	Senior	G
		W. P. White
		William W. Williams		R/D

== Standings ==
1897–98 Collegiate ice hockey standings
	Intercollegiate							Overall					
	GP	W	L	T	PCT.	GF	GA	GP	W	L	T	GF	GA
Brown	5	4	0	1	.900	12	2	6	4	1	1	13	10
Columbia	4	0	3	1	.125	2	11	13	3	8	2		
Harvard	3	2	1	0	.667	6	9	4	3	1	0	11	11
Haverford	–	–	–	–	–	–	–	–	–	–	–	–	–
Johns Hopkins	4	0	3	1	.125	1	10	17	5	8	4	20	32
Maryland	3	2	0	1	.833	8	0	–	–	–	–	–	–
MIT	–	–	–	–	–	–	–	–	–	–	–	–	–
Pennsylvania	6	2	2	2	.500			11	6	3	2		
Pennsylvania Dental College	–	–	–	–	–	–	–	–	–	–	–	–	–
Yale	6	2	2	2	.500	9	4	8	3	3	2	12	7

== Schedule and results ==
Date	Opponent	Site	Result	Record
Regular Season
December 14	vs. Northampton Hockey Club	North Avenue Ice Palace • Baltimore, Maryland	L 2–4	0–1–0 (0–1–0)
December 21	vs. Walbrook Athletic Club	North Avenue Ice Palace • Baltimore, Maryland	W 3–1	1–1–0 (1–1–0)
January 4	vs. Walbrook Athletic Club	North Avenue Ice Palace • Baltimore, Maryland	W 2–0	2–1–0 (2–1–0)
January 13	vs. Maryland Athletic Club	North Avenue Ice Palace • Baltimore, Maryland	T 5–5	2–1–1 (2–1–1)
January 17	vs. Maryland Athletic Club	North Avenue Ice Palace • Baltimore, Maryland	W 1–0	3–1–1 (3–1–1)
January 28	vs. Maryland Athletic Club	North Avenue Ice Palace • Baltimore, Maryland	L 0–1	3–2–1 (3–2–1)
February 1	vs. Maryland	North Avenue Ice Palace • Baltimore, Maryland	L 0–2	3–3–1 (3–3–1)
February 8	vs. Walbrook Athletic Club	North Avenue Ice Palace • Baltimore, Maryland	T 2–2	3–3–2 (3–3–2)
February 14	vs. Walbrook Athletic Club	North Avenue Ice Palace • Baltimore, Maryland	T 1–1	3–3–3 (3–3–3)
February 17	vs. Northampton Hockey Club	North Avenue Ice Palace • Baltimore, Maryland	L 1–2	3–4–3 (3–4–3)
February 18	vs. Pennsylvania*	North Avenue Ice Palace • Baltimore, Maryland	L 1–2	3–5–3
February 19	vs. Quaker City Hockey Club*	North Avenue Ice Palace • Baltimore, Maryland	L 0–5	3–6–3
February 25	vs. Maryland	North Avenue Ice Palace • Baltimore, Maryland	L 0–6	3–7–3 (3–5–3)
March 1	vs. Maryland Athletic Club	North Avenue Ice Palace • Baltimore, Maryland	W 1–0	4–7–3 (4–5–3)
March 7	vs. Northampton Hockey Club	North Avenue Ice Palace • Baltimore, Maryland	L 0–1	4–8–3 (4–6–3)
March 9	vs. Walbrook Athletic Club	North Avenue Ice Palace • Baltimore, Maryland	W 1–0	5–8–3 (5–6–3)
March 10	vs. Maryland	North Avenue Ice Palace • Baltimore, Maryland	T 0–0	5–8–4 (5–6–4)
*Non-conference game.
