= 1897–98 Yale Bulldogs men's ice hockey season =

College ice hockey season

- Conference: 2nd IHA

Record
- Overall: 3–3–2
- Conference: 2–2–2
- Home: 2–2–1
- Road: 1–1–1

Coaches and captains
- Captain: William Barnett

The 1897–98 Yale Bulldogs men's ice hockey season was the third season of play for the program.

== Season ==
For the first time the Elis played a majority of their games against fellow college programs as well as play most of their games at home.

The team did not have a coach, however, M. Mullally served as team manager.

== Roster ==
| No. | Nat. | Player | Class | Pos | Height | Weight | DoB | Hometown | Previous team |
|---|---|---|---|---|---|---|---|---|---|
| | | William Barnett (C) | Senior | F | | | 1876-09-26 |
| | | John Brock | Sophomore |
| | | Shiras Campbell | Sophomore |
| | (United States) | Alfred Coxe | Freshman | | | | | Utica, New York |
| | (United States) | John Hall | Senior | D | | | 1877-09-16 | Pittsburgh, Pennsylvania |
| | | Holkins Palmer | | | | | 1877-08-01 |
| | | Robert Smith | Junior | G |
| | (United States) | Sanford Stoddard | Junior | F | | | 1877-10-11 | Bridgeport, Connecticut |
| | (United States) | Gardner Walworth | Sophomore | F | | | 1878-05-04 | Newton Center, Massachusetts |

== Standings ==
1897–98 Collegiate ice hockey standings
| | Intercollegiate | | | | | | | Overall | | | | | |
| | GP | W | L | T | PCT. | GF | GA | GP | W | L | T | GF | GA |
|---|---|---|---|---|---|---|---|---|---|---|---|---|---|
| Brown | 5 | 4 | 0 | 1 | .900 | 12 | 2 | 6 | 4 | 1 | 1 | 13 | 10 |
| Columbia | 4 | 0 | 3 | 1 | .125 | 2 | 11 | 13 | 3 | 8 | 2 | | |
| Harvard | 3 | 2 | 1 | 0 | .667 | 6 | 9 | 4 | 3 | 1 | 0 | 11 | 11 |
| Haverford | – | – | – | – | – | – | – | – | – | – | – | – | – |
| Johns Hopkins | 4 | 0 | 3 | 1 | .125 | 1 | 10 | 17 | 5 | 8 | 4 | 20 | 32 |
| Maryland | 3 | 2 | 0 | 1 | .833 | 8 | 0 | – | – | – | – | – | – |
| MIT | – | – | – | – | – | – | – | – | – | – | – | – | – |
| Pennsylvania | 6 | 2 | 2 | 2 | .500 | | | 11 | 6 | 3 | 2 | | |
| Pennsylvania Dental College | – | – | – | – | – | – | – | – | – | – | – | – | – |
| Yale | 6 | 2 | 2 | 2 | .500 | 9 | 4 | 8 | 3 | 3 | 2 | 12 | 7 |

1897–98 Intercollegiate Hockey Association standings
| | Conference | | | | | | | Overall | | | | | |
| | GP | W | L | T | PCT. | GF | GA | GP | W | L | T | GF | GA |
|---|---|---|---|---|---|---|---|---|---|---|---|---|---|
| Brown | 4 | 3 | 0 | 1 | .875 | 6 | 2 | 6 | 4 | 1 | 1 | 13 | 10 |
| Yale | 6 | 2 | 2 | 2 | .500 | 9 | 4 | 8 | 3 | 3 | 2 | 12 | 7 |
| Columbia | 4 | 0 | 3 | 1 | .125 | 2 | 11 | 13 | 3 | 8 | 2 | | |

== Schedule and results ==
| Date | Opponent | Site | Result | Record |
Regular season
| January 29 | vs. Brown | Clermont Avenue Skating Rink • Brooklyn, New York | L 0–1 | 0–1–0 |
| February 4 | at Columbia | St. Nicholas Rink • New York, New York | W 4–0 | 1–1–0 |
| February 18 | vs. Brown | Clermont Avenue Skating Rink • Brooklyn, New York | T 0–0 ^{OT} | 1–1–1 |
| February 21 | at Maryland Athletic Club* | North Avenue Ice Palace • Baltimore, Maryland | W 2–1 | 2–1–1 |
| February 22 | at Maryland Athletic Club* | North Avenue Ice Palace • Baltimore, Maryland | L 1–2 | 2–2–1 |
| February 26 | Brown | New Haven, Connecticut | L 1–2 | 2–3–1 |
| March 5 | at Columbia | Clermont Avenue Skating Rink • Brooklyn, New York | T 0–0 ^{OT} | 2–3–2 |
| March 12 | Columbia | Clermont Avenue Skating Rink • Brooklyn, New York | W 4–1 | 3–3–2 |
*Non-conference game.
