= 1897–98 Penn Quakers men's ice hockey season =

- Home ice: West Park Ice Palace

Record
- Overall: 6–3–2
- Conference: 3–2–2
- Home: 1–0–0
- Road: 1–1–0
- Neutral: 4–2–2

Coaches and captains
- Captain: Arthur Stackhouse

The 1897–98 Penn Quakers men's ice hockey season was the 2nd season of play for the program.

== Season ==
With the West Park Ice Palace being built, the Quakers had a facility with stable ice to rely upon for the season. They were able to play an expanded schedule against mostly local teams and even compete in a local hockey league. The team ended up in a tie for second place with the since-closed Pennsylvania Dental College at a 3–2 record. Penn tied PDC twice during the season but as many leagues didn't count ties so those games were left off of the final standings. Because Wayne Country Club was part of the league it cannot be counted as a college conference.

Standings for the Philadelphia Hockey Clubs are included for reference.

Team	GP	W	L	PCT.
Haverford	6	5	1	.833
Pennsylvania	5	3	2	.600
Pennsylvania Dental College	5	3	2	.600
Wayne Country Club	6	0	6	.000

The team did not have a head coach but Arthur Stackhouse served as team manager.

== Roster ==
No.	Nat.	Player	Class	Pos	Height	Weight	DoB	Hometown	Previous team
		Caldwell	Senior	D/R
		Clinton Decker		R/D
		Elliot		G
		Gorman	Sophomore	LW/D
		Laing	Sophomore	C
		Arthur J. Moore	Senior	G
	(Canada)	George Orton	Graduate	F			1873-01-10	Strathroy, Ontario
		Padley		G
		C. S. Rogers	Junior	D/F
		Arthur Stackhouse (C)	Senior	D/F
		William E. Wallace	Sophomore	RW/R

== Standings ==
1897–98 Collegiate ice hockey standings
	Intercollegiate							Overall					
	GP	W	L	T	PCT.	GF	GA	GP	W	L	T	GF	GA
Brown	5	4	0	1	.900	12	2	6	4	1	1	13	10
Columbia	4	0	3	1	.125	2	11	13	3	8	2		
Harvard	3	2	1	0	.667	6	9	4	3	1	0	11	11
Haverford	–	–	–	–	–	–	–	–	–	–	–	–	–
Johns Hopkins	4	0	3	1	.125	1	10	17	5	8	4	20	32
Maryland	3	2	0	1	.833	8	0	–	–	–	–	–	–
MIT	–	–	–	–	–	–	–	–	–	–	–	–	–
Pennsylvania	6	2	2	2	.500			11	6	3	2		
Pennsylvania Dental College	–	–	–	–	–	–	–	–	–	–	–	–	–
Yale	6	2	2	2	.500	9	4	8	3	3	2	12	7

== Schedule and results ==
Date	Opponent	Site	Result	Record
Regular Season
January 13	vs. Haverford	West Park Ice Palace • Philadelphia, Pennsylvania	L 1–2	0–1–0 (0–1–0)
January 18	vs. Pennsylvania Dental College	West Park Ice Palace • Philadelphia, Pennsylvania	T 2–2	0–1–1 (0–1–1)
February 1	vs. Haverford	West Park Ice Palace • Philadelphia, Pennsylvania	L 1–4	0–2–1 (0–2–1)
February 8	vs. Pennsylvania Dental College	West Park Ice Palace • Philadelphia, Pennsylvania	W 3–1	1–2–1 (1–2–1)
February 11	at Maryland Athletic Club*	North Avenue Ice Palace • Baltimore, Maryland	L 1–3	1–3–1
February 12	at Maryland Athletic Club*	North Avenue Ice Palace • Baltimore, Maryland	W 2–2 †	2–3–1
February 17	vs. Wayne Country Club*	West Park Ice Palace • Philadelphia, Pennsylvania	W 3–2	3–3–1
February 18	vs. Johns Hopkins*	West Park Ice Palace • Philadelphia, Pennsylvania	W 2–1	4–3–1
	vs. Wayne Country Club	West Park Ice Palace • Philadelphia, Pennsylvania	W 3–2	5–3–1 (2–2–1)
January 27	vs. Wayne Country Club	West Park Ice Palace • Philadelphia, Pennsylvania	W 3–1	6–3–1 (3–2–1)
January 29	vs. Pennsylvania Dental College	West Park Ice Palace • Philadelphia, Pennsylvania	T 1-1	6–3–2 (3–2–2)
*Non-conference game.

† The Maryland Athletic Club refused to play in the 10-minute overtime session and were charged with a forfeit by the referee.
