= 1897–98 Brown men's ice hockey season =

Intercollegiate Champion Intercollegiate Hockey Association, Champion
- Conference: 1st IHA

Record
- Overall: 4–1–1
- Conference: 3–0–1
- Road: 4–1–1

Coaches and captains
- Captain: Irving Hunt

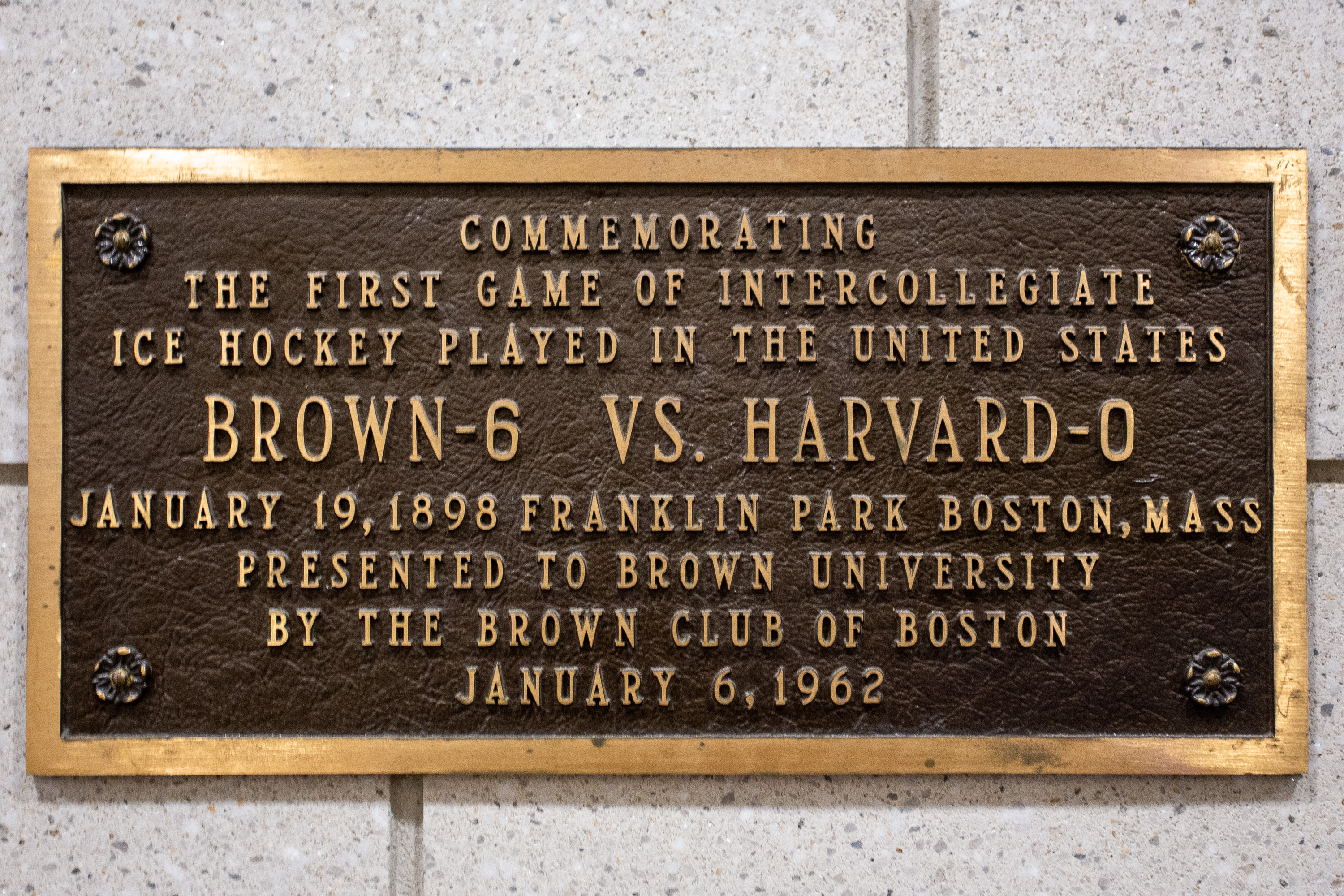
A plaque in Meehan Auditorium commemorates the first game

The 1897–98 Brown men's ice hockey season was the inaugural season of play for the program.

== Season ==
For Brown's first ice hockey season all games were played on the road. The travel schedule was rather light, however, as the furthest they had to travel was New York City. The Bears finished with a very good record of 4–1–1 and, with their only loss coming against a non-collegiate opponent, the Bears could lay claim to the Intercollegiate championship (though there were few active college programs).

=== First game ===
Often cited as the "first game of intercollegiate ice hockey played in the United States" is the contest against Harvard on January 19, 1898 at Franklin Park, Boston. Students from Brown took the train to Boston, where they met with some students from Harvard. They commandeered a patch of a frozen pond in Franklin Park, asked pleasure skaters to move aside, set up some poles to mark the goals, and played the game of ice hockey they had learned in Canada. The details and outcome of the game were recorded in the following day's Boston Herald: Brown 6, Harvard 0.

=== Mascot ===
Brown University did not formally adopt the Bear as its mascot until the fall of 1905.

== Roster ==
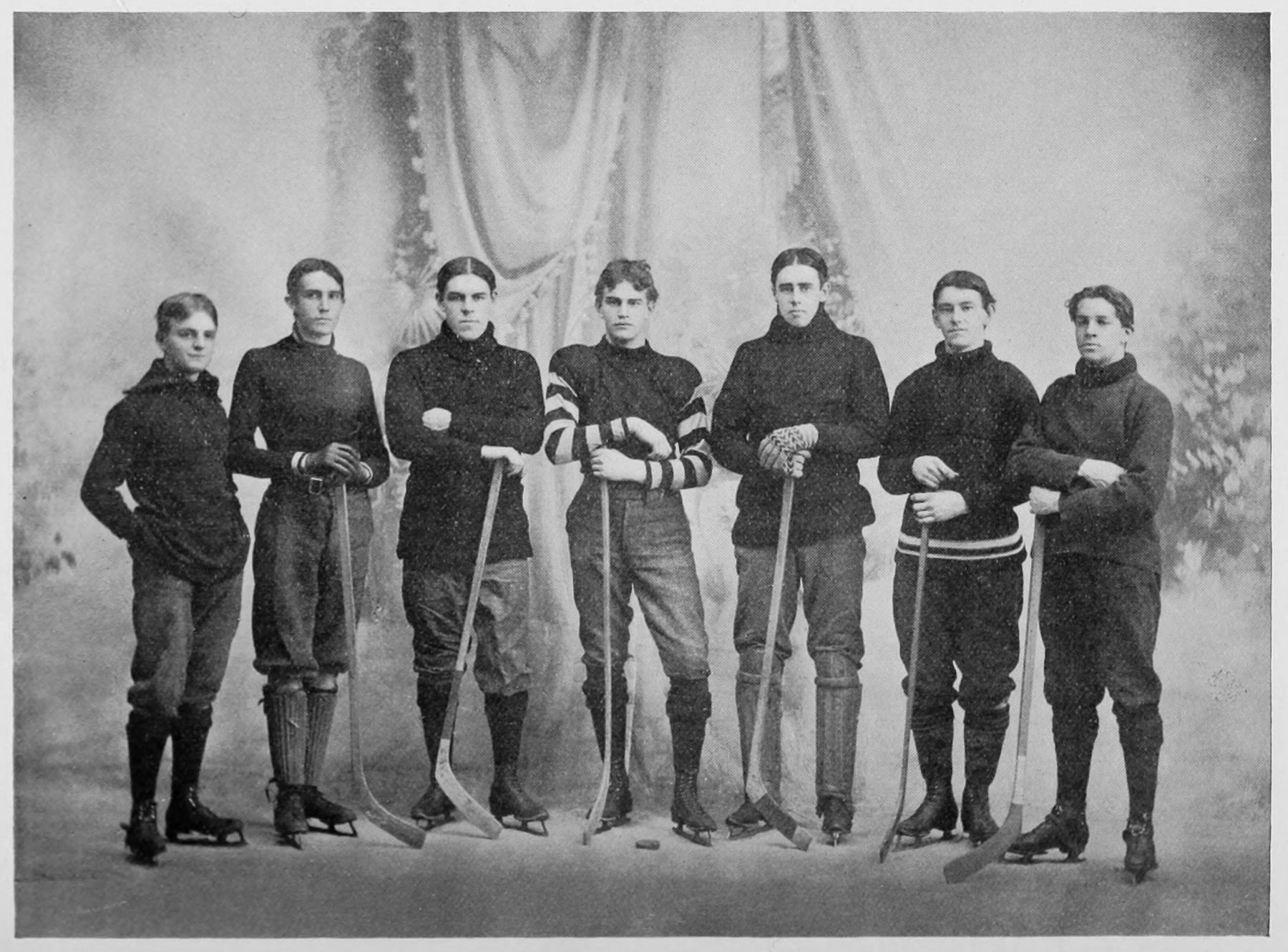
First Brown University hockey team in 1897–98. From left: Robert Steere, Harris Bucklin, Jesse Pevear, Irving Hunt, Albert Barrows, Charles Cooke, Horace Day. (William Bates not pictured)

No.	Nat.	Player	Class	Pos	Height	Weight	DoB	Hometown	Previous team
	(United States)	Albert Barrows	Senior	F			1877-10-13	Providence, Rhode Island
	(United States)	William Bates	Freshman				1879-01-07	Providence, Rhode Island
		Harris Bucklin	Sophomore	F
		Charles Cooke	Junior
		Horace Day	Junior
	(United States)	Irving Hunt (C)	Junior	F			1878-01-30	Providence, Rhode Island
	(United States)	Jesse Pevear	Junior				1877-05-26	Lynn, Massachusetts
		Robert Steere	Freshman

== Standings ==
1897–98 Collegiate ice hockey standings
	Intercollegiate							Overall					
	GP	W	L	T	PCT.	GF	GA	GP	W	L	T	GF	GA
Brown	5	4	0	1	.900	12	2	6	4	1	1	13	10
Columbia	4	0	3	1	.125	2	11	13	3	8	2		
Harvard	3	2	1	0	.667	6	9	4	3	1	0	11	11
Haverford	–	–	–	–	–	–	–	–	–	–	–	–	–
Johns Hopkins	4	0	3	1	.125	1	10	17	5	8	4	20	32
Maryland	3	2	0	1	.833	8	0	–	–	–	–	–	–
MIT	–	–	–	–	–	–	–	–	–	–	–	–	–
Pennsylvania	6	2	2	2	.500			11	6	3	2		
Pennsylvania Dental College	–	–	–	–	–	–	–	–	–	–	–	–	–
Yale	6	2	2	2	.500	9	4	8	3	3	2	12	7

1897–98 Intercollegiate Hockey Association standings
	Conference							Overall					
	GP	W	L	T	PCT.	GF	GA	GP	W	L	T	GF	GA
Brown	4	3	0	1	.875	6	2	6	4	1	1	13	10
Yale	6	2	2	2	.500	9	4	8	3	3	2	12	7
Columbia	4	0	3	1	.125	2	11	13	3	8	2		

== Schedule and results ==
Date	Opponent	Site	Result	Record
Regular Season
January 19	at Harvard*	Franklin Park • Boston, Massachusetts	W 6–0	1–0–0
January 29	at Yale	New Haven, Connecticut	W 1–0	2–0–0 (1–0–0)
February 12	at Columbia	Clermont Avenue Skating Rink • New York, New York	W 3–1	3–0–0 (2–0–0)
February 18	at Yale	New Haven, Connecticut	T 0–0 ^{OT}	3–0–1 (2–0–1)
February 19	at New York Athletic Club*	St. Nicholas Rink • New York, New York	L 1–8	3–1–1
February 26	at Yale	New Haven, Connecticut	W 2–1	4–1–1 (3–0–1)
*Non-conference game.
