= Harold Chapman (orthodontist) =

British orthodontist

- Born: 1881; Liverpool, England
- Died: 10 August 1965 (aged 83–84)
- Education: Pennsylvania College of Dental Surgery
- Known for: Being the first exclusive Orthodontic Practitioner in England
- Medical career
- Profession: Dentist
- Sub-specialties: Orthodontist

Harold Chapman (1881 – 10 August 1965) was a British orthodontist who was England's first exclusive orthodontic practitioner in 1921. He was also the President of the European Orthodontic Society and British Dental Association during his career.

== Life ==
He was born in Liverpool in 1881. He attended Thetford Grammar School while growing up. He attended Victoria University (United Kingdom) for College after which he then attended University of Liverpool School of Dentistry and received his L.D.S.R..C.S. degree in 1903. He was then appointed Dental House Surgeon at Royal Liverpool University Hospital. This followed by him practiced for 9 months in Southport, Lancashire where he met Mathew H. Cryer who was at that time the Professor of Oral Surgery at University of Pennsylvania. After meeting him, Chapman travelled to USA and enrolled in Pennsylvania College of Dental Surgery where he obtained his dental degree.

He then enrolled himself in Angle School of Orthodontia and graduated from there in 1905. After his return, Chapman worked with George Northcroft for 2 years before starting his own practice in 1921. He then became the first person in England to solely practice orthodontics. He continued working in his practice until his retirement in 1952.

He was an Honorary Dental Surgeon at Barts and The London School of Medicine and Dentistry in 1911. He also organised the first postgraduate course on orthodontics in England on behalf of the Dental Board of United Kingdom. Royal College of Surgeons of England awarded him with Faculty of Dental Surgery in 1947.

== Awards and positions ==
- British Dental Association - President (1934)
- Royal Society of Medicine, Odontological Section - President (1943)
- European Orthodontic Society - President (1938)
- British Society for the Study of Orthodontics - Secretary (1910–1925), President (1925–1952), Honorary Treasurer (1942–1952)
- Barts and The London School of Medicine and Dentistry - Faculty member of 40 years
