= 1897–98 United States collegiate men's ice hockey season =

- Duration: January 1898– March 1898
- Collegiate champion: Brown

The 1897–98 United States collegiate men's ice hockey season was the 4th season of collegiate ice hockey.

With the addition of Brown University and Harvard University to the ice hockey ranks, the first ice hockey conference was formed and named the first unofficial collegiate champion.

After the school year ended, Johns Hopkins University became the first college to dissolve its ice hockey program, citing travel costs, disagreements between the rink managers, and lack of support from the student body. Johns Hopkins would not field another ice hockey team for 90 years.

== Regular season ==
=== Standings ===
1897–98 Collegiate ice hockey standings
	Intercollegiate							Overall					
	GP	W	L	T	PCT.	GF	GA	GP	W	L	T	GF	GA
Brown	5	4	0	1	.900	12	2	6	4	1	1	13	10
Columbia	4	0	3	1	.125	2	11	13	3	8	2		
Harvard	3	2	1	0	.667	6	9	4	3	1	0	11	11
Haverford	–	–	–	–	–	–	–	–	–	–	–	–	–
Johns Hopkins	4	0	3	1	.125	1	10	17	5	8	4	20	32
Maryland	3	2	0	1	.833	8	0	–	–	–	–	–	–
MIT	–	–	–	–	–	–	–	–	–	–	–	–	–
Pennsylvania	6	2	2	2	.500			11	6	3	2		
Pennsylvania Dental College	–	–	–	–	–	–	–	–	–	–	–	–	–
Yale	6	2	2	2	.500	9	4	8	3	3	2	12	7

1897–98 Intercollegiate Hockey Association standings
	Conference							Overall					
	GP	W	L	T	PCT.	GF	GA	GP	W	L	T	GF	GA
Brown	4	3	0	1	.875	6	2	6	4	1	1	13	10
Yale	6	2	2	2	.500	9	4	8	3	3	2	12	7
Columbia	4	0	3	1	.125	2	11	13	3	8	2		
