= 1897–98 Harvard Crimson men's ice hockey season =

College ice hockey season

- Conference: Independent

Record
- Overall: 3–1–0
- Home: 0–1–0
- Neutral: 3–0–0

Coaches and captains
- Captain: Frederick Goodridge

The 1897–98 Harvard Crimson men's ice hockey season was the inaugural season of play for the program.

== Season ==
Over the previous few years Harvard had played 'ice polo' with Frederick Goodridge captaining the team. For the 1897-98 season the players switched to ice hockey and the team played its first game January 19, losing 0–6 against Brown.

Note: Harvard University did not formally adopt Crimson as its moniker until 1910 but the student body had uniformly been associated with the color since 1875.

== Roster ==
No.	Nat.	Player	Class	Pos	Height	Weight	DoB	Hometown	Previous team
	(United States)	William Beardsell	Sophomore	F
		Baldwin		D
		E. K. Bowser		D
	(Austria)	George Clement	Sophomore	D			1877-04-21	Wien, Austria
	(United States)	Frederick Goodridge (C)	Senior	F			1873-10-26	Cambridge, Massachusetts
	(United States)	Roger Hardy	Freshman	F			1878-01-18	Brookline, Massachusetts
	(United States)	Frank Holt	Senior	F			1869-04-30	Newport, Rhode Island
	(United States)	Isaac Hoxie	Freshman	D			1879-01-02	Roxbury, Massachusetts
	(United States)	George Matteson	Sophomore	F			1875-01-25	Providence, Rhode Island
		Fred Russell	Junior	G			1877-03-16
	(United States)	Edward Stevens	Junior	F/D				Staten Island, New York

== Standings ==
1897–98 Collegiate ice hockey standings
	Intercollegiate							Overall					
	GP	W	L	T	PCT.	GF	GA	GP	W	L	T	GF	GA
Brown	5	4	0	1	.900	12	2	6	4	1	1	13	10
Columbia	4	0	3	1	.125	2	11	13	3	8	2		
Harvard	3	2	1	0	.667	6	9	4	3	1	0	11	11
Haverford	–	–	–	–	–	–	–	–	–	–	–	–	–
Johns Hopkins	4	0	3	1	.125	1	10	17	5	8	4	20	32
Maryland	3	2	0	1	.833	8	0	–	–	–	–	–	–
MIT	–	–	–	–	–	–	–	–	–	–	–	–	–
Pennsylvania	6	2	2	2	.500			11	6	3	2		
Pennsylvania Dental College	–	–	–	–	–	–	–	–	–	–	–	–	–
Yale	6	2	2	2	.500	9	4	8	3	3	2	12	7

== Schedule and results ==
Date	Opponent	Site	Result	Record
Regular Season
January 19	Brown*	Franklin Park • Boston, Massachusetts	L 0–6	0–1–0
February 3	vs. Newtowne Athletic Club*	Locust Street Rink • Boston, Massachusetts	W 5–2	1–1–0
February 4	vs. MIT*	Locust Street Rink • Boston, Massachusetts	W 3–2	2–1–0
February 8	vs. MIT*	Crystal Lake • Newton Center, Massachusetts	W 3–1	3–1–0
*Non-conference game.
