= Pennsylvania Dental College =

Pennsylvania Dental College may refer to the following institutions:

- University of Pennsylvania School of Dental Medicine, founded 1878
- Pennsylvania College of Dental Surgery, founded 1856, absorbed by University of Pennsylvania School of Dental Medicine in 1909
