= 1897–98 Columbia men's ice hockey season =

- Conference: 3rd IHA
- Home ice: St. Nicholas Rink

Record
- Overall: 2–8–2
- Conference: 0–3–1

Coaches and captains
- Captain: William Belden

The 1897–98 Columbia men's ice hockey season was the 2nd season of play for the program.

== Season ==
Note: Columbia University adopted the Lion as its mascot in 1910.

== Roster ==
| No. | Nat. | Player | Class | Pos | Height | Weight | DoB | Hometown | Previous team |
|---|---|---|---|---|---|---|---|---|---|
| | | William Belden (C) | Senior | D |
| | | De Forest | | F |
| | | Elliott | | F |
| | | A. M. Henderson | Sophomore | F |
| | | Livingston | | F |
| | | Lyle | | F |
| | | McGuire | | F |
| | | O'Connor | | F |
| | | James Pell | Junior | F |
| | | Gerard Roberts | Senior | G |
| | | William Robb | Graduate | F/D |
| | | Bartow Van Voorhis | Senior | F |
| | | John T. Williams | Senior | D |

== Standings ==
1897–98 Collegiate ice hockey standings
| | Intercollegiate | | | | | | | Overall | | | | | |
| | GP | W | L | T | PCT. | GF | GA | GP | W | L | T | GF | GA |
|---|---|---|---|---|---|---|---|---|---|---|---|---|---|
| Brown | 5 | 4 | 0 | 1 | .900 | 12 | 2 | 6 | 4 | 1 | 1 | 13 | 10 |
| Columbia | 4 | 0 | 3 | 1 | .125 | 2 | 11 | 13 | 3 | 8 | 2 | | |
| Harvard | 3 | 2 | 1 | 0 | .667 | 6 | 9 | 4 | 3 | 1 | 0 | 11 | 11 |
| Haverford | – | – | – | – | – | – | – | – | – | – | – | – | – |
| Johns Hopkins | 4 | 0 | 3 | 1 | .125 | 1 | 10 | 17 | 5 | 8 | 4 | 20 | 32 |
| Maryland | 3 | 2 | 0 | 1 | .833 | 8 | 0 | – | – | – | – | – | – |
| MIT | – | – | – | – | – | – | – | – | – | – | – | – | – |
| Pennsylvania | 6 | 2 | 2 | 2 | .500 | | | 11 | 6 | 3 | 2 | | |
| Pennsylvania Dental College | – | – | – | – | – | – | – | – | – | – | – | – | – |
| Yale | 6 | 2 | 2 | 2 | .500 | 9 | 4 | 8 | 3 | 3 | 2 | 12 | 7 |

1897–98 Intercollegiate Hockey Association standings
| | Conference | | | | | | | Overall | | | | | |
| | GP | W | L | T | PCT. | GF | GA | GP | W | L | T | GF | GA |
|---|---|---|---|---|---|---|---|---|---|---|---|---|---|
| Brown | 4 | 3 | 0 | 1 | .875 | 6 | 2 | 6 | 4 | 1 | 1 | 13 | 10 |
| Yale | 6 | 2 | 2 | 2 | .500 | 9 | 4 | 8 | 3 | 3 | 2 | 12 | 7 |
| Columbia | 4 | 0 | 3 | 1 | .125 | 2 | 11 | 13 | 3 | 8 | 2 | | |

== Schedule and results ==
| Date | Opponent | Site | Result | Record |
Regular Season
| December 4 | St. Nicholas Hockey Club* | St. Nicholas Rink • New York, New York | L 0–3 | 0–1–0 |
| January 5 | New Jersey Athletic Club* | St. Nicholas Rink • New York, New York | W 4–1 | 1–1–0 |
| January 10 | vs. Naval Reserves* | St. Nicholas Rink • New York, New York | W 1–0 | 2–1–0 |
| January 11 | Montclair Athletic Club* | Clermont Avenue Skating Rink • Brooklyn, New York | L 2–3 | 2–2–0 |
| January 12 | vs. New York Athletic Club* | St. Nicholas Rink • New York, New York | W 5–4 | 3–2–0 |
| January 18 | vs. New York Athletic Club* | St. Nicholas Rink • New York, New York | L 0–2 | 3–3–0 |
| January 29 | vs. New York Athletic Club* | St. Nicholas Rink • New York, New York | L ? | 3–4–0 |
| February 5 | at Yale | New Haven, Connecticut | L 0–4 | 3–5–0 (0–1–0) |
| February 12 | Brown | Clermont Avenue Skating Rink • Brooklyn, New York | L 1–3 | 3–6–0 (0–2–0) |
| February 26 | New Jersey Athletic Club* | St. Nicholas Rink • New York, New York | T 3–3 | 3–6–1 |
| March 5 | Yale | Clermont Avenue Skating Rink • Brooklyn, New York | T 0–0 ^{OT} | 3–6–2 (0–2–1) |
| March 12 | Yale | Clermont Avenue Skating Rink • Brooklyn, New York | L 1–4 | 3–7–2 (0–3–1) |
| March 16 | Montclair Athletic Club* | St. Nicholas Rink • New York, New York | L 0–7 | 3–8–2 |
*Non-conference game.
