= Bonwill Triangle =

Anatomical region in the face

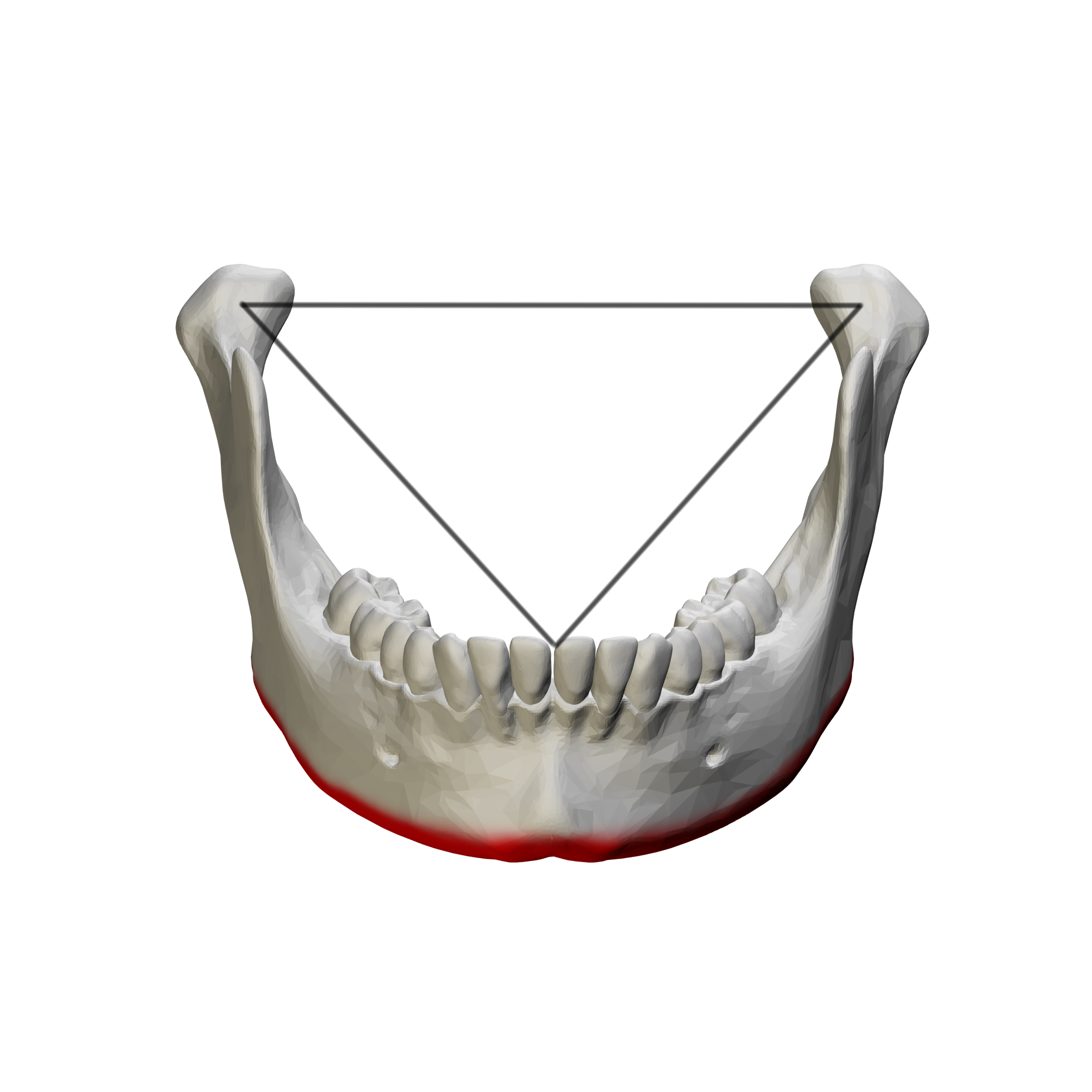
Bonwill Triangle

The Bonwill Triangle is a triangle formed by the contact point of the mandibular central incisors and the right and left mandibular condyles.

== Description ==
The distance between those points is equal in most humans and amounts on average to about 10 cm. The triangle is therefore an equilateral triangle in those cases. William Gibson Arlington Bonwill (1833–1899) was the first to describe this.

Two variants of the Bonwill Triangle have been described that differ in the exact location of the points on the condyles. In one the points are located on the articulating surfaces of the condyles whilst in the other they are located centrally within the heads of the mandible.

== Application ==
In terms of practical application, the Bonwill Triangle is utilized in the construction and correct application of fixed articulators, which (in contrast to fully- and semi-adjustable articulators) are a type of articulator that does not allow for adjustments to imitate the specific movements of an individual's jaw. Instead, these articulators are designed to replicate the average movements of the jaw, and among others the Bonwill Triangle relationship is used to achieve this result.

== See also ==
- Frankfurt plane
