= John Nutting Farrar =

American dentist

- Born: April 24, 1839; Massachusetts
- Died: June 12, 1913 (aged 74); New York, New York
- Education: Pennsylvania College of Dental Surgery
- Known for: Father of American Orthodontics, Developing, Publishing first paper that talked about Irregularities of teeth in 1874
- Medical career
- Profession: Dentist

John Nutting Farrar (April 24, 1839 – June 12, 1913) was an American dentist who is considered to be the "Father of American Orthodontics". He published several of his works in Dental Cosmos, and they are known to be monumental for the field of Orthodontics at that time. His paper published in 1876 was the first paper ever published about the movement of teeth in the field of dentistry.

== Life ==
John Nutting Farrar was born in Massachusetts in 1839. He attended the Academy of Pepperell for two years, after which he enrolled in a private school in Elmira, New York, where he studied mathematics, astronomy, geology, et cetera. Farrar earned his DDS degree from the Pennsylvania College of Dental Surgery. While studying at the college, Farrar roomed with Baxter, who later rose to become another prominent figure in the field of dentistry. After graduating, Farrar spent four months in West Indies, and upon the failing health of his mother, he returned to Pepperell, Massachusetts. He eventually returned to Philadelphia to pursue his MD degree, which he attained in 1874 from Thomas Jefferson University. He then began teaching operative dentistry at the Pennsylvania College of Dental Surgery. His work on treating the alveolar abscess was eventually published in Dental Cosmos. He then started teaching at the Baltimore College of Dental Surgery, where he continued teaching for more than 20 years. During his lifetime, Farrar was a member of the Brooklyn Dental Society, the First District Dental Society of New York, the Odontological Society of New York, et cetera. After 1875, Farrar became the leading writer about the topic of irregularities of teeth.

Farrar was married to Sarah M. Chandler, and they had a son who died early in his infancy.

He died at his home in New York City on June 12, 1913.

== Orthodontics ==
Farrar initially studied the process of tooth movement, and his first published work was in Dental Cosmos in 1876. His published work was titled Regulation of the Teeth Made Easy by the Positive System, and he theorized that pressure moved teeth. He further published his work in Dental Cosmos in 1888 and 1898, when his work contained over 1400 pen-and-ink sketches drawn by him. These sketches, pertaining to tooth movement at that time, were important to orthodontics as a profession and the knowledge in the field. Farrar attended several dental meetings at that time and he was very vocal about advocating for orthodontics being established as a separate field from dentistry.

Farrar was known for many inventions and contributions during his life. He invented elastic car wheels and a type-writing machine, the first typewriter built in America. In 1875, he used 18k gold to regulate dental appliances, and the results of this appliance was published in Dental Cosmos. He also invented a water meter, a screw-activated syringe used by physicians, and antral tube, and tubes for treating the antrum through the nares.
