= William G. A. Bonwill =

American dentist and researcher (1833–1899)

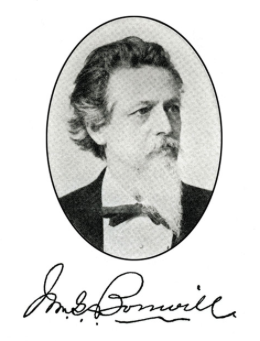
William Gibson Arlington Bonwill

William Gibson Arlington Bonwill (October 4, 1833 – September 24, 1899) was an American dentist and researcher. The Bonwill Triangle is named after him.

== Life ==
Bonwill was born as the son of W. M. Bonwill, a medical practitioner. He finished in 1866 with a degree in dentistry at the Pennsylvania College of Dental Surgery and then studied medicine at the Jefferson Medical College. In October 1854 he settled in Dover, Delaware in private practice. He practiced there until 1871 and then moved to Philadelphia, Pennsylvania. On September 24, 1899 Bonwill died at St. Joseph's Hospital, Philadelphia, Pennsylvania, to a sepsis secondary to prostate surgery, which had caused an acute cystitis and chronic nephritis.

== Research ==
Bonwill was engaged in the development of dentistry throughout his life. To date, his findings are associated with his name. About his dental research a long list of inventions have made him famous among professionals of his time, such as combine harvesters for wheat harvest, kerosene lamps, boilers, lighters and more. Mostly he patented his inventions. He was elected as a member to the American Philosophical Society in 1885.

=== Bonwill Triangle ===
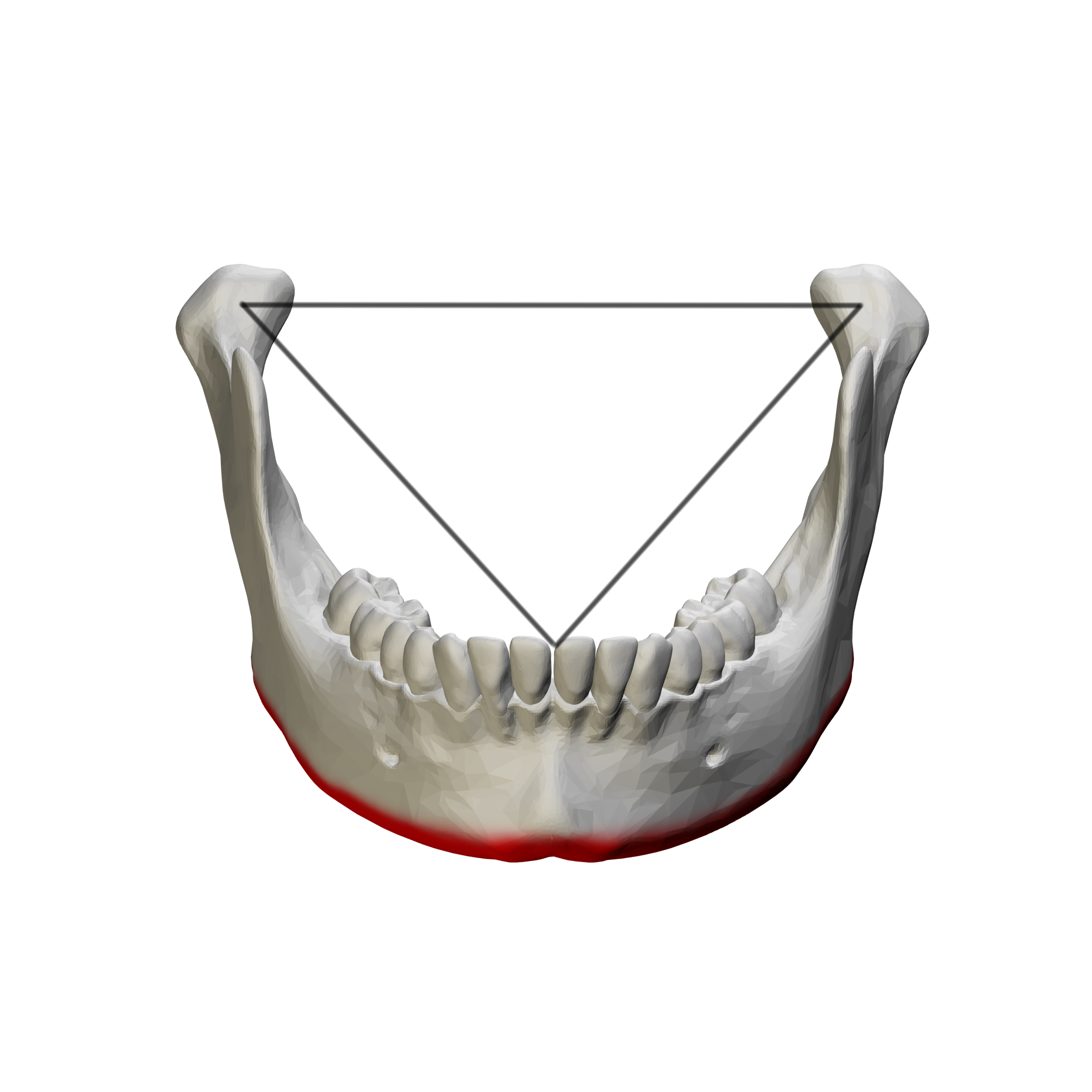
Bonwill-Triangle of the mandible

He examined 4,000 mandibles of corpses and another 6,000 from living people and found that the distance between the condyles was four inches and the distance between each condyle and the contact point of the two lower central incisors, the incisal point of the mandible (lower jaw), corresponded. The latter is also called symphysis. These three points form an equilateral triangle, which does not change throughout life. Bonwill presented these findings in 1864 during a meeting of the Delaware Dental Society to the dental public. This triangle is established as the Bonwill triangle in the scientific literature. He completed his findings that the dimensions of the teeth and other cranial bones and even the whole body are in constant relation to the length of the sides of this triangle. He postulated the fact that as soon as the dimensions of a tooth are known, it´s possible to deduce the entire skeleton.

=== Bonwill articulator ===
After preliminary work by Daniel Evans (1840) and as a result of his jaw measurements Bonwill developed in 1864 the first Bonwill articulator, a device for simulating the temporomandibular joint movements for manufacturing dentures. These plaster models of the dental arches of the upper and lower jaw are mounted in occlusion in the articulator. Bonwill coined the term "articulation" and replaced the older concept of occlusion. Its principle was used in almost all advanced articulators. He developed the "balanced occlusion" and referred to the "three point contact".

=== Gold foil filling ===
In 1867, he developed an electromagnetic hammer, with which one could use gold as a restorative material for a tooth gold foil filling easier and faster, and had it patented in 1873. In November 1875, he was honored for this work with the Elliott Cresson Medal, the highest award of the Franklin Institute of Philadelphia. He expanded the technique for condensing amalgam while laying amalgam fillings.

=== Anesthesia ===
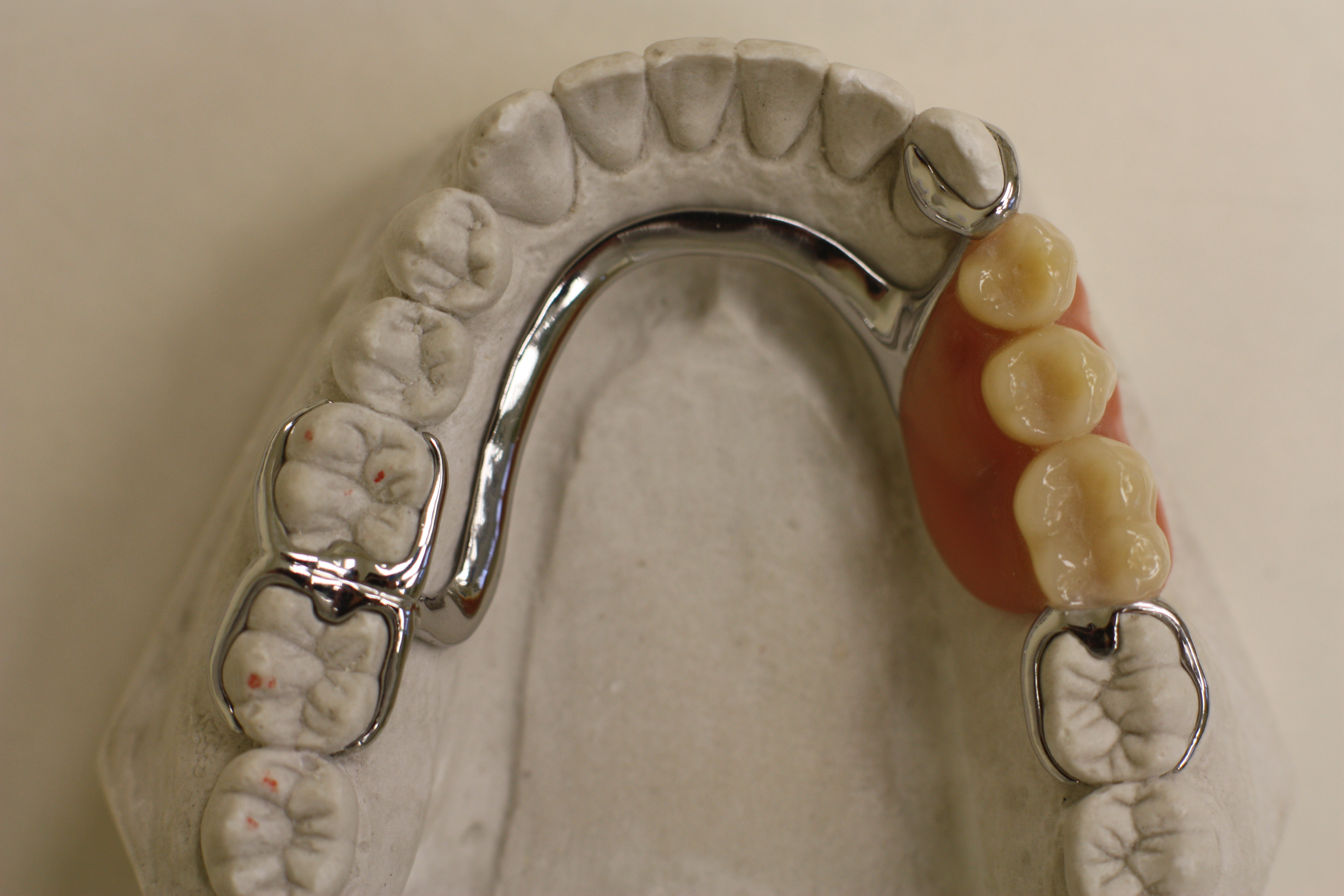
Mandibular partial denture with Bonwill Brace (left)

He developed a method for anesthesia in minor surgery, during childbirth and in dental procedures through a forced breathing of the patient (hyperventilation). For this purpose, the patient must perform 80-100 breaths per minute. It was published in 1875 under the title "The air an anesthetic" and presented at the Franklin Institute.

=== Bonwill Brace ===
Bonwill invented an eponymous clip for attaching a partial denture to existing teeth. The Bonwill Brace is a support bracket - by combining two brackets, which includes two adjacent teeth.

== Literature ==
- Erich Göhler, Bonwill und seine Verdienste um die Entwicklung der Zahnheilkunde, Medizinische Dissertation., Leipzig, 1926, Glashütte i. S., (1925)
- Süleyman Hulusi Gündog, Untersuchungen über die Winkelbeziehungen zwischen Okklusionsebene und der Gesichtsebene. Subnasale, arbiträrer Gelenkachspunkt als Bezugsebene bei der Rehabilitation des Kauorgans, sowie über die geometrischen Verhältnisse des sogenannten Bonwill'schen Dreiecks, (1978)
- Norbert Schwenzer, Zahn-Mund-Kiefer-Heilkunde – Band 3, Prothetik und Werkstoffkunde, Thieme, (1982) S. 289
- Karlheinz Körber, Zahnärztliche Prothetik, Thieme, 3. Auflage, 1985 Stuttgart: S. 18, 24 ISBN 3-13-658804-5.
- D. J. Di Giacomo, William G. A. Bonwill: A Leading Light of Dentistry in the 19th Century, Bulletin of the History of Dentistry. 1/1987, S. 17–20.
- J. El. Otaola, Dr William G. A. Bonwill, La Odontología (1899) S. 412–427.
- El Dr Bonwill - Apuntes para una semblanza, La Odontología, 1893, S. 807–810.
