= L. Adele Cuinet =

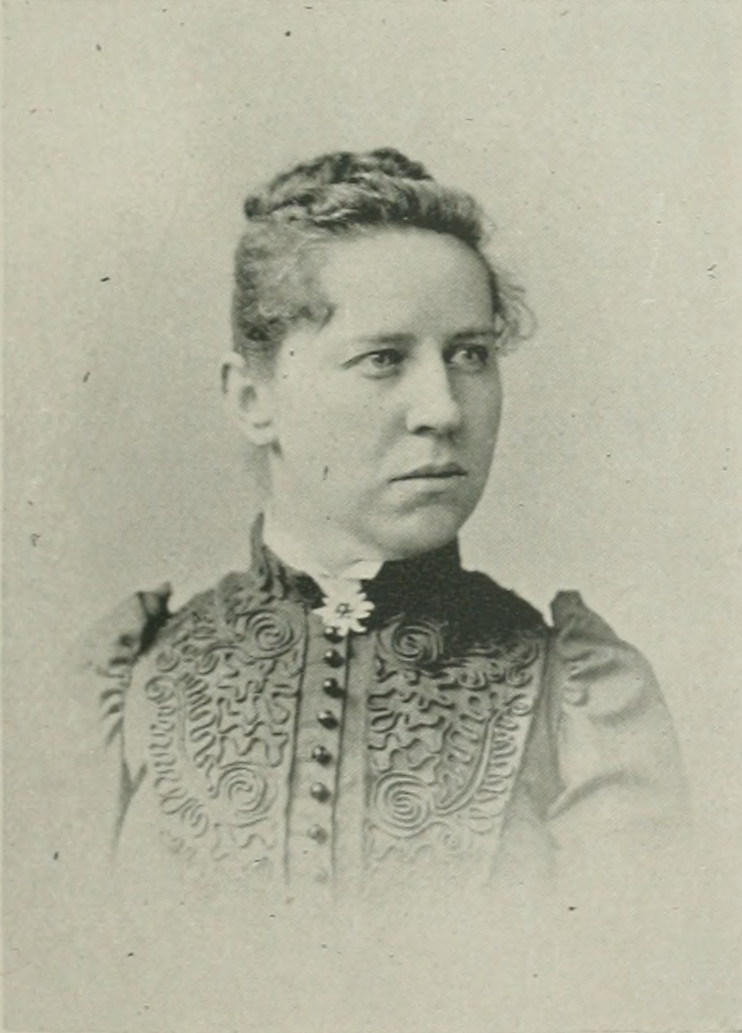
- Portrait photo from A Woman of the Century
- Born: Louise Adèle Cuinet; November 29, 1855; Hoboken, New Jersey, U.S.
- Died: November 21, 1933 (aged 77); Brooklyn, New York, U.S.
- Burial place: Green-Wood Cemetery
- Education: Pennsylvania College of Dental Surgery
- Occupation: Dental surgeon
- Known for: First woman dentist in Brooklyn, New York
- Partner: Dr. Helene Lassen

L. Adele Cuinet (November 29, 1855 – November 21, 1933) was a pioneer American dental surgeon, being the first woman dentist in Brooklyn, New York. Since childhood, she was a suffragist.

== Early life and education ==
Louise Adèle Cuinet was born in Hoboken, New Jersey, November 29, 1855. (Note: According to Leonard (1914), Louise was born in 1860.) She was of French parentage, her parents being L. Constant and Zenobia (Humbert) Cuinet. On the maternal side, she was a descendant of the Huguenot Humberts, a family of local eminence in Neuchâtel, Switzerland, where they bought refuge in the 16th century. Adele's mother was a suffragette.

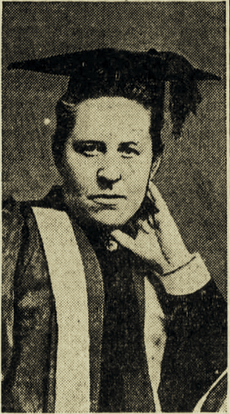
Wearing cap and gown.

Upon her decision to adopt dentistry as a profession, Cuinet realized that, in addition to the ordinary obstacles presented to youth and inexperience, she might also encounter the prejudice which confronts every woman who ventures upon a career considered at the time to be the exclusive province of men. She therefore determined to thoroughly equip herself. She completed the course at the Model School, Trenton, New Jersey, in 1881. She also studied for two years with a prominent dentist in New York City, preparatory to entering, in 1881, the Pennsylvania College of Dental Surgery. That institution graduated one woman about 26 years prior and then closed its doors against women for eight years, until Dr. Truman became dean. Cuinet graduated from that school (D.D.S., 1885), in high standing, taking one of the first places in a class of 59.

Later, she returned to school, studying law and completing the program at the Woman's Law Class of New York University.

== Career ==
For the first 25 years of her practice, Cuinet was the only woman in New York City who belonged to city's Dental Society and the only Doctor of Dental Surgery in New York. She owned a four-story, 18 room brownstone in Brooklyn Heights with offices on the bottom floors, and her home on the upper ones.

She was the one woman belonging to the Second District Dental Society of New York, and the only one practicing in Brooklyn. Cuinet lectured for several years to nurses of Memorial Hospital for Women and Children on hygiene of mouth and care of teeth.

Cuinet was a writer of ability and contributed much to the literature of her day. She was the author of various articles for newspapers and magazines.

In 1893, Cuinet was a delegate to the Dental Convention, World's Columbian Exposition, Chicago, Illinois. In 1928, she created the Brooklyn Hoover/Curtis Women's Constitutional Committee, which later became the L. A. Cuinet Civic Association. In 1930, she traveled through China and studied conditions on behalf of the YMCA.

Involved in the woman's suffrage movement since childhood, Cuinet and her partner, Dr. Helene Lassen, were leaders of Brooklyn's suffrage movement.

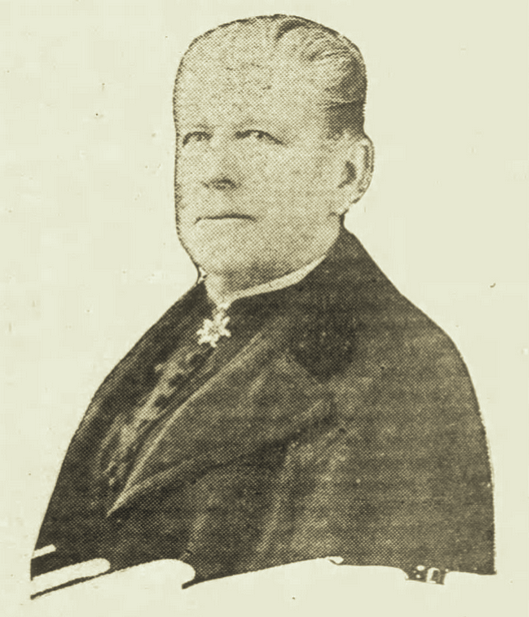
Cuinet in 1925

She was a member of the Physicians and Surgeons branch of the Woman's Political Equality League, Women's Suffrage Party, Women's Political Union, People's Equality League of Brooklyn.

== Personal life ==
Dr. Helene Lassen was Cuinet's life-long partner.

In religion, Cuinet was Episcopalian. She purchased land a built a waterfront home in Asharoken, Long Island where political and medical people would mingle.

Cuinet traveled abroad four or five times before her retirement in 1923, after 32 years of practice. In that year, her plans were for an elaborate trip, sailing for Algiers, spending several weeks in the African deserts, and then on to Tunis, and then to Egypt, sailing up the Nile and visiting the Egyptian temples. From there, here itinerary included Sicily, then Italy, Switzerland and Austria, and a flight from Paris to London. Most of the traveling on the European continent would be by automobile. In Africa, the travel was to be by caravans. In the summer of 1925, she toured the U.S., the route being by way of Pittsburgh, Cleveland. Chicago, Milwaukee, Saint Paul, Minnesota; Yellowstone National Park, Spokane, and Portland, Oregon. On the return trip, San Francisco, Salt Lake City, Cheyenne, Denver, Kansas City, Missouri, and St. Louis were on the itinerary. In 1930, Cuinet was in China talking about the opium problem and researching ways to curb it in the U.S.

== Death and legacy ==
L. Adele Cuinet died in Brooklyn, November 21, 1933. Burial was at that city's Green-Wood Cemetery.

The Cuinet Civic League, the civic association for Brooklyn Heights and Downtown Brooklyn, was named in her honor.
