= Matthew Cryer =

American oral surgeon

Matthew Henry Cryer
- Born: July 11, 1840; Manchester, UK
- Education: Pennsylvania College of Dental Surgery
- Known for: Founder of first hospital based dental service in United States, developing surgical devices for extraction of teeth
- Medical career
- Profession: Dentist
- Sub-specialties: Oral Surgeon

Matthew Henry Cryer (July 11, 1840 – August 12, 1921) was an American oral surgeon who is known for founding the first hospital based dental service in United States. The hospital was named Philadelphia General Hospital. He is also known for developing the electrically operated surgical engine for cutting bone and the spiral Osteotome and guard for cranial surgery.

== Life ==
Cryer was born in Manchester, UK in 1840. He moved with his family to United States during his early years in childhood. Cryer started studying at Pennsylvania College of Dental Surgery in 1874 and received his dental degree in two years. He also received his medical degree in 1877 from the same university. After his graduation, he taught at his learning institution about dentistry. He then spent next 17 years teaching Oral Surgery and eventually he became a Professor of Oral Surgery in 1897. He was also the uncle to Robert H. Ivy.

Cryer wrote many textbooks about the anatomical textbooks. During his career, he collected many skulls and specimens to do research the collection is stored at what it is known today as Mutter Museum of the College of Physicians in Philadelphia.

== Oral Surgery ==
Cryer made several contributions to the field of oral and maxillofacial surgery. He is also known for developing the electrically operated surgical engine for cutting bone for jaw surgery and the spiral osteotome and guard for cranial surgery. In 1904, he designed forces to extract teeth during dental surgery. These tools specifically were universally designed for incisor and their roots. The two forceps were designed for upper and lower teeth. The left and right elevators also developed from his contributions. He initially made the two left and right scaling instruments for the scaling purposes and eventually he was able to use them to elevate dental roots.
