= Baltimore Hockey League =

Short-lived amateur ice hockey league

- Sport: Ice hockey
- Founded: 1896
- First season: 1896
- Folded: 1898
- Country: United States
- Last champion: University of Maryland (1897–98)
- Most titles: University of Maryland (2)

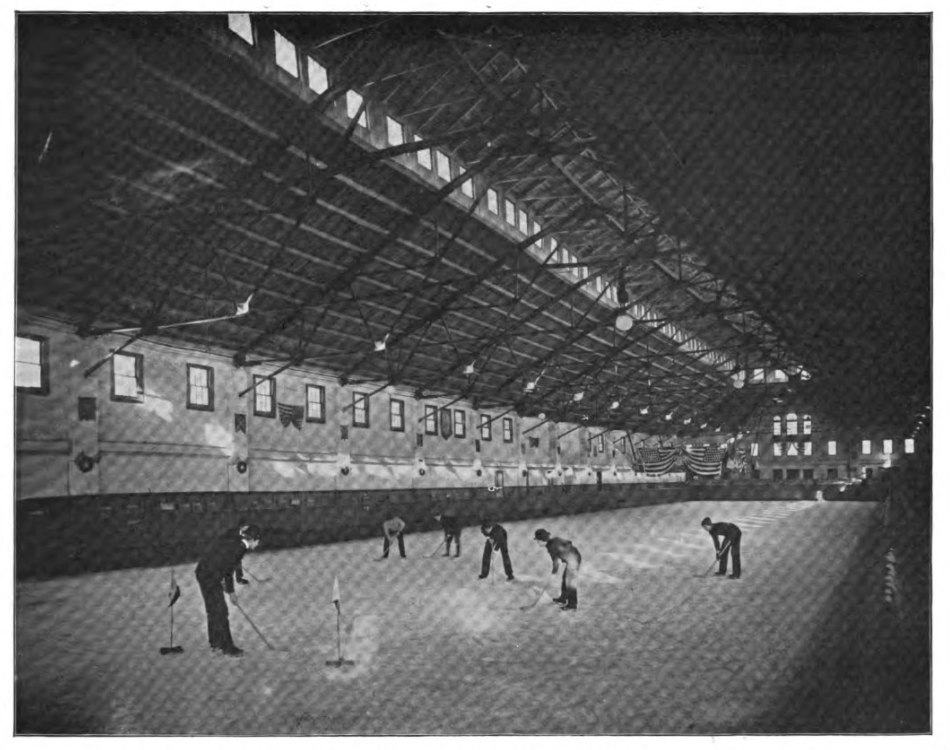
Interior of the North Avenue Ice Palace where the Baltimore Hockey League played its games.

The Baltimore Hockey League (BHL), was an early and short-lived amateur ice hockey league founded in 1896 and existing for two seasons in Baltimore, Maryland, United States in 1896–97 and 1897–98. The league included teams from Johns Hopkins University, Maryland Athletic Club, Northampton Hockey Club, University of Maryland and Walbrook Athletic Club and operated at the North Avenue Ice Palace at North Avenue in Baltimore. The teams played for the Northampton Hockey Trophy, presented by J. L. Filon.

The University of Maryland team won the championship title both in 1897 and in 1898. The 1897–98 season ended on March 10, 1898 with a 0–0 tie between the Johns Hopkins University and the University of Maryland. The University of Maryland team was led on ice by brothers Milton Morris "Mickey" Whitehurst (rover, born 1873) and Jesse Herbert "Pat" Whitehurst (goaltender and forward, born 1874).

Other players in the league included psychiatrist Harry Cotton and Canadian-American astronomer Samuel Alfred Mitchell.

== Teams ==
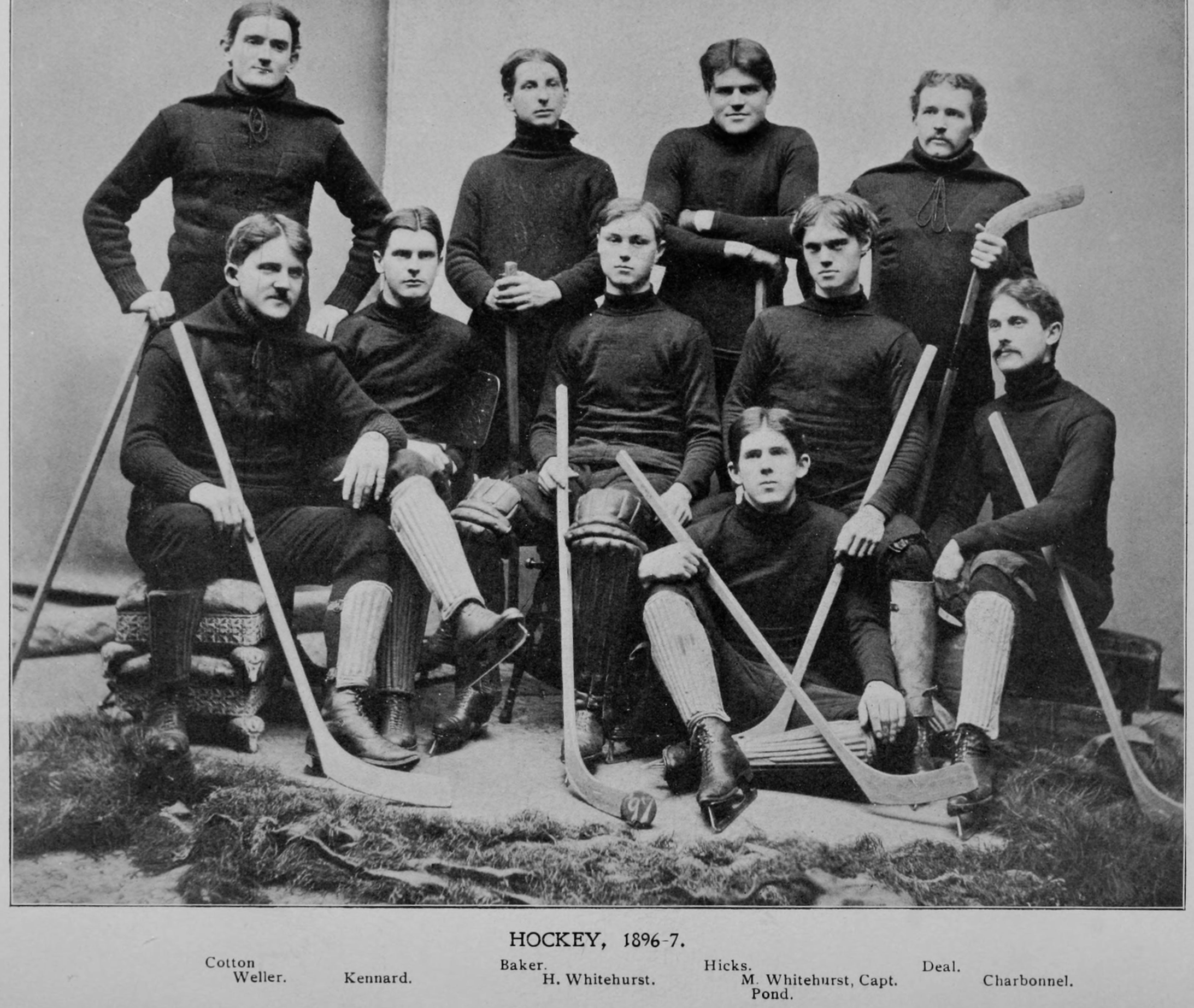
University of Maryland team in 1896–97

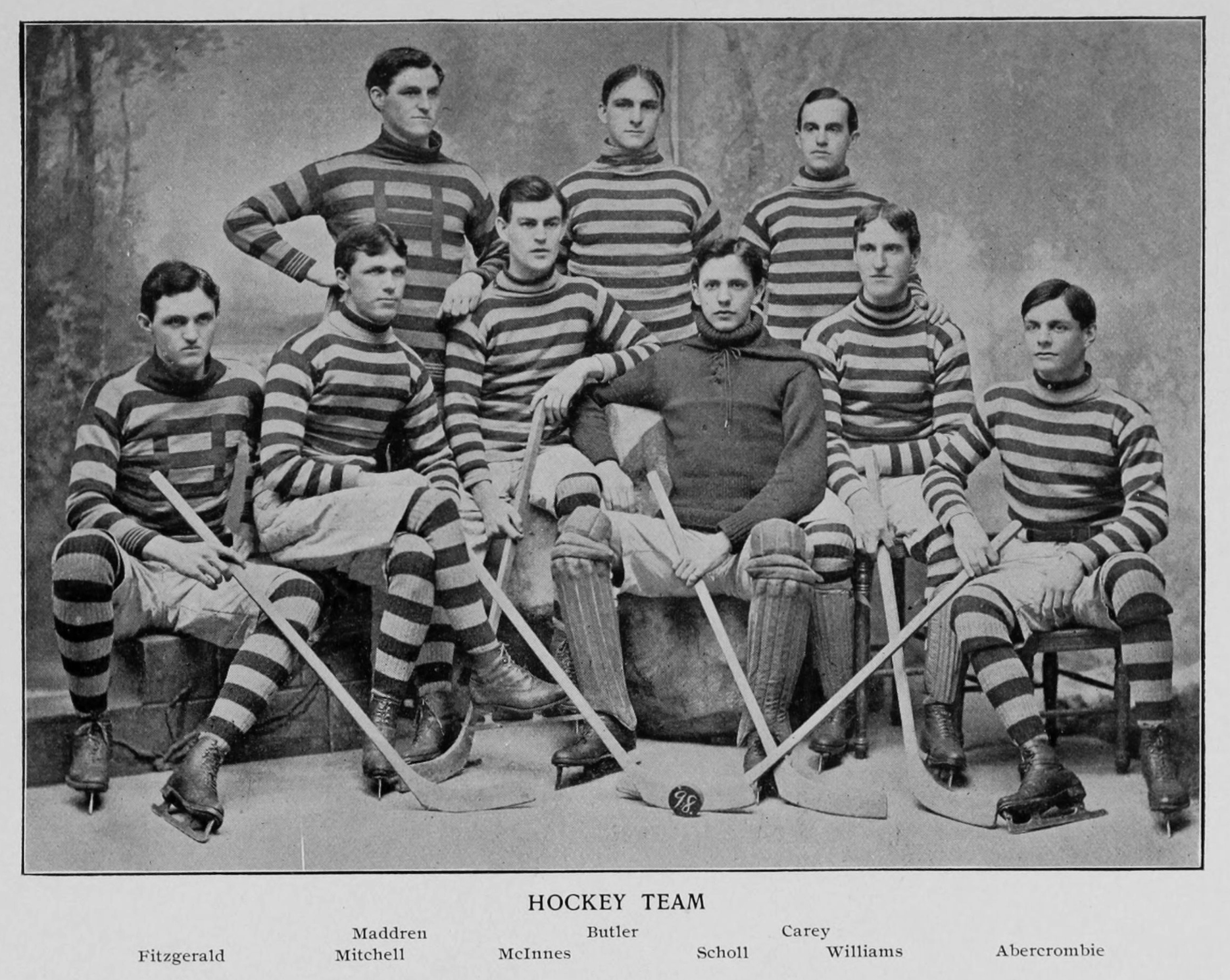
Johns Hopkins University team in 1897–98

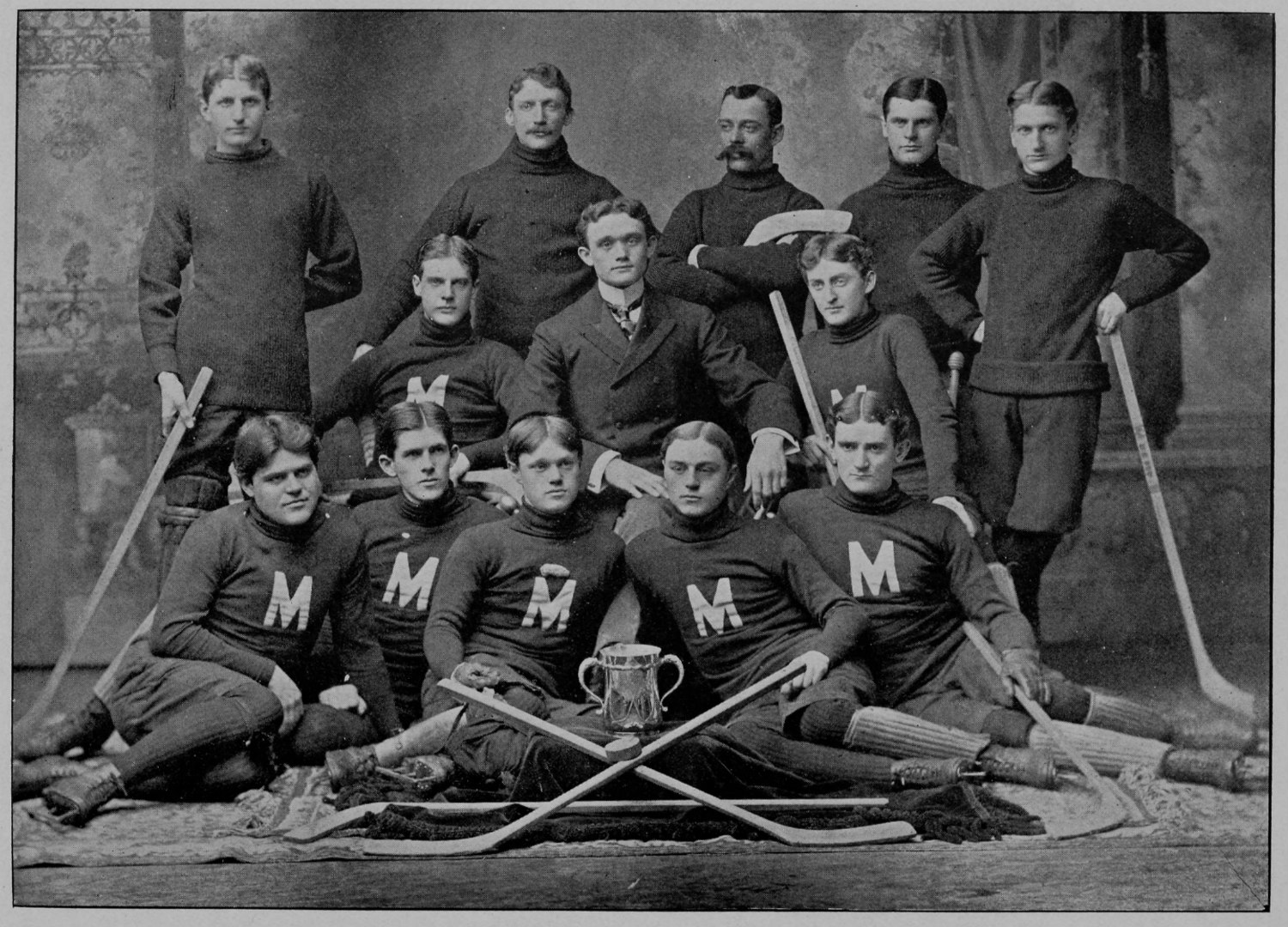
University of Maryland team in 1897–98 with the Northampton Hockey Trophy.

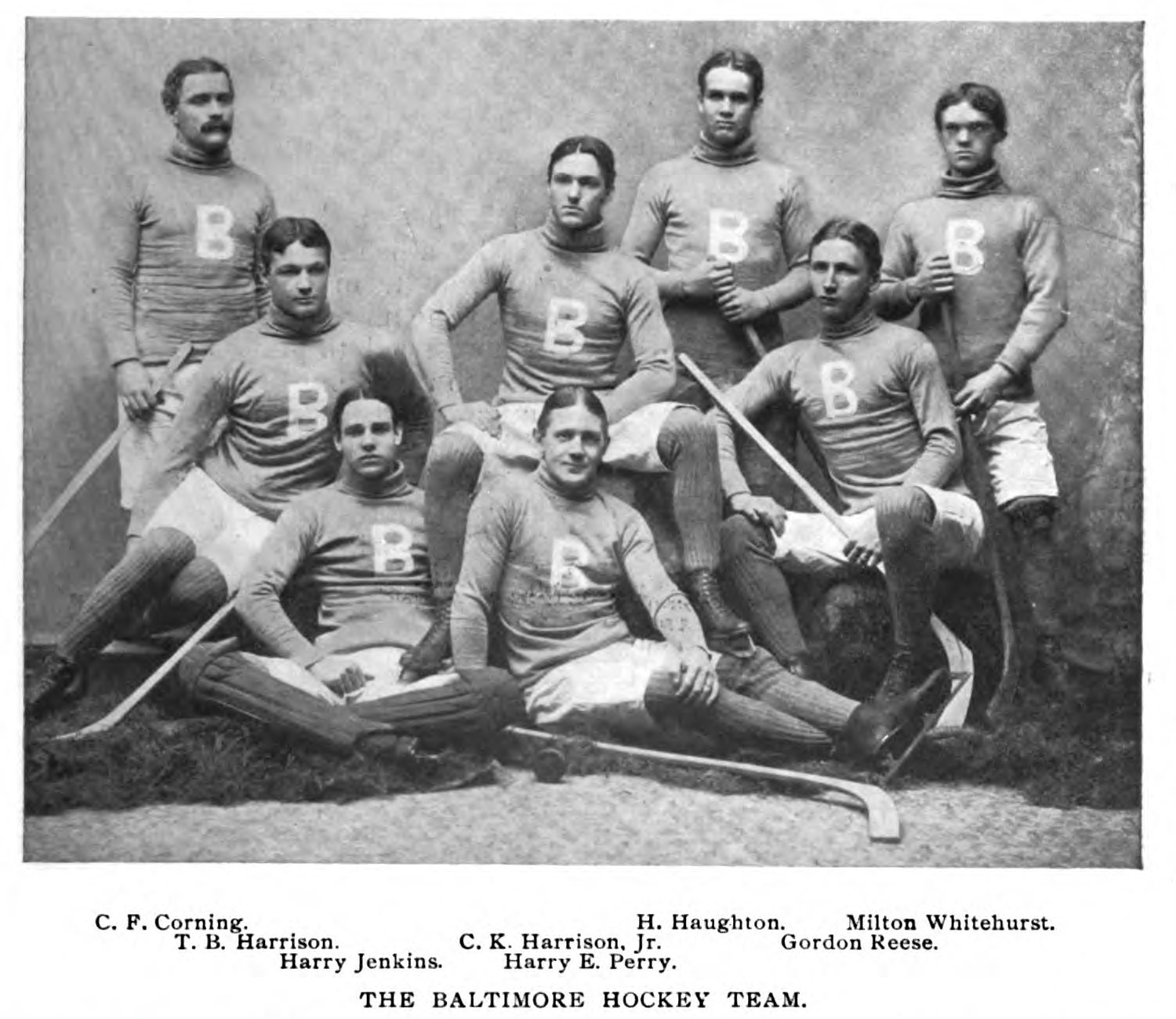
Baltimore Hockey Club in 1896–97

Teams that played in the BHL include:

- Johns Hopkins University (1896–1898)
- Maryland Athletic Club (1896–1898)
- Northampton Hockey Club (1896–1898)
- University of Maryland (1896–1898)
- Walbrook Athletic Club (1897–98)
