= North Avenue Ice Palace =

Artificial ice rink in Maryland, United States

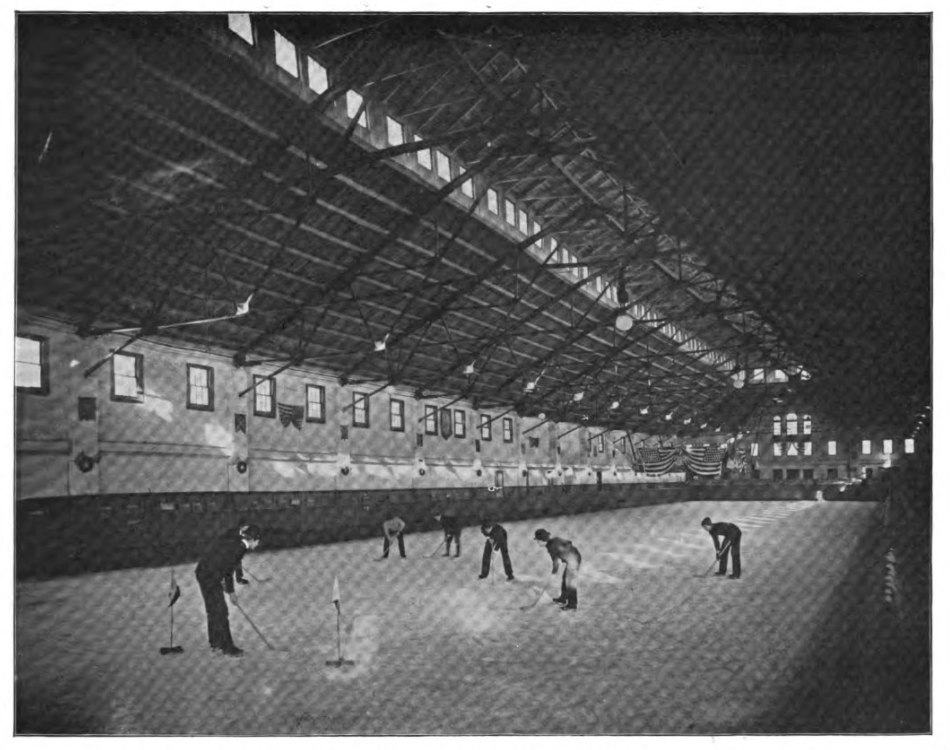
- Inside of the North Avenue Ice Palace.
- Interactive map of North Avenue Ice Palace
- Location: North Avenue at Lovegrove Alley, Baltimore, Maryland, United States
- Coordinates: 39.311277°N 76.615962°W
- Surface: mechanically frozen ice
- Field size: 55 feet by 250 feet (surface), 75 feet by 300 feet (building)

Construction
- Opened: December 26, 1894

The North Avenue Ice Palace in Baltimore, Maryland, United States was one of the first examples of an indoor artificial ice rink in North America. It was located on North Avenue between Charles Street and Lovegrove Alley and extended north to 20th Street. It was constructed by the Arctic Skating Company, managed by Gerald T. Hopkins, Jr. The ice rink was used for pleasure skating and ice sports, including early games of ice hockey.

The artificial ice was constructed by laying several layers of waterproof paper and wool. On top of this was built a 4-inch tall watertight pan, which held the water. In the pan were three and one-half miles of one and a half inch pipe which held ammonia, cooled below the freezing point of water. The cold pipes then caused the ice to freeze. The construction of the rink had been opposed by local churches in the area that were concerned about the noise made by the crowds enjoying the facility.

The building opened on December 26, 1894, and featured a seven-per-side game of ice hockey between a team of Johns Hopkins University students and players from the Baltimore Athletic Club. The game ended in a 2–2 draw. This may have been the first game of ice hockey played on a sheet of artificial ice and was one of the first in the United States. The game was 60 minutes, with two halves of 30 minutes. Attendance for the opening and game was recorded as about 2,500.

On February 14, 1896, the rink hosted what is considered the first intercollegiate game of ice hockey in the United States, a game between Yale University and Johns Hopkins. Yale, captained by Malcolm Chace, won the game 2–1, with Chace scoring both goals. The teams played six-per-side, (minus the rover) making the game an early instance of six-per-side hockey.

For two seasons (1896–97 and 1897–98) the rink hosted the Baltimore Hockey League, composed of Johns Hopkins University, the Maryland Athletic club, Northampton Hockey Club, Walbrook Athletic Club (in 1897–98 only) and the University of Maryland. The last competitive ice hockey games at the rink as reported by The Baltimore Sun and the Baltimore American were held on March 10, 1898, between Johns Hopkins and University of Maryland, and a second game between Walbrook and the Maryland Athletic Club to decide the hockey league championship. Hopkins and Maryland tied 2–2 and Walbrook won 2–0. The league decided to not replay the tie and the championship was awarded to the University of Maryland. On March 11 and March 12, the New York City Hockey Club played exhibition games at the rink against "All-Baltimore" teams made up of players from all teams in the Baltimore league.

The facility was used for other events than ice hockey and pleasure skating outside of the winter months. In April 1897, the Baltimore Kennel Association held a dog show at the facility. A programme of vaudeville was held at the Palace in June and July 1898.

In November 1898, the ice machinery was removed and the surface changed for roller skating and roller hockey. In 1899, the building was sold by trustee at auction on October 31, 1899, for $38,000. It was resold for $65,000 then sold again in 1900 to the United Milk Producer's Association of Baltimore which bought the facility to be used for manufacturing and storage.

In 1932, the "Sports Centre" ice rink was built on the location of the old ice rink by the Casino Amusement Corporation. The new facility was equipped for ice hockey, basketball, wrestling and boxing; seating 2,500 for ice hockey and 4,000 for boxing and wrestling. The Sports Centre operated until 1956 when it was bought by Equitable Trust and razed to provide a parking lot for its customers.

== Selection of ice hockey teams which played at the North Avenue Ice Palace ==
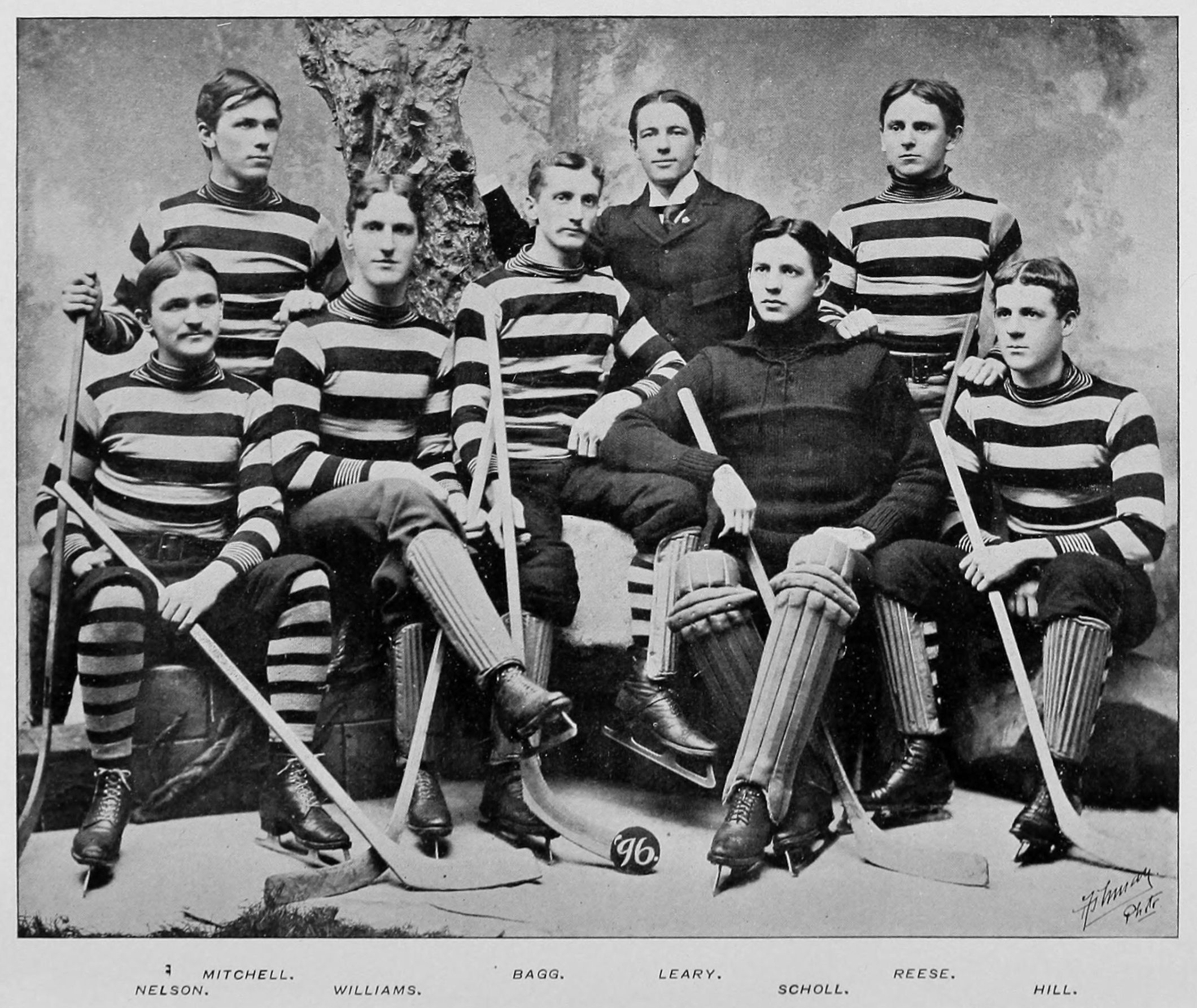
Johns Hopkins University hockey team in 1895–96

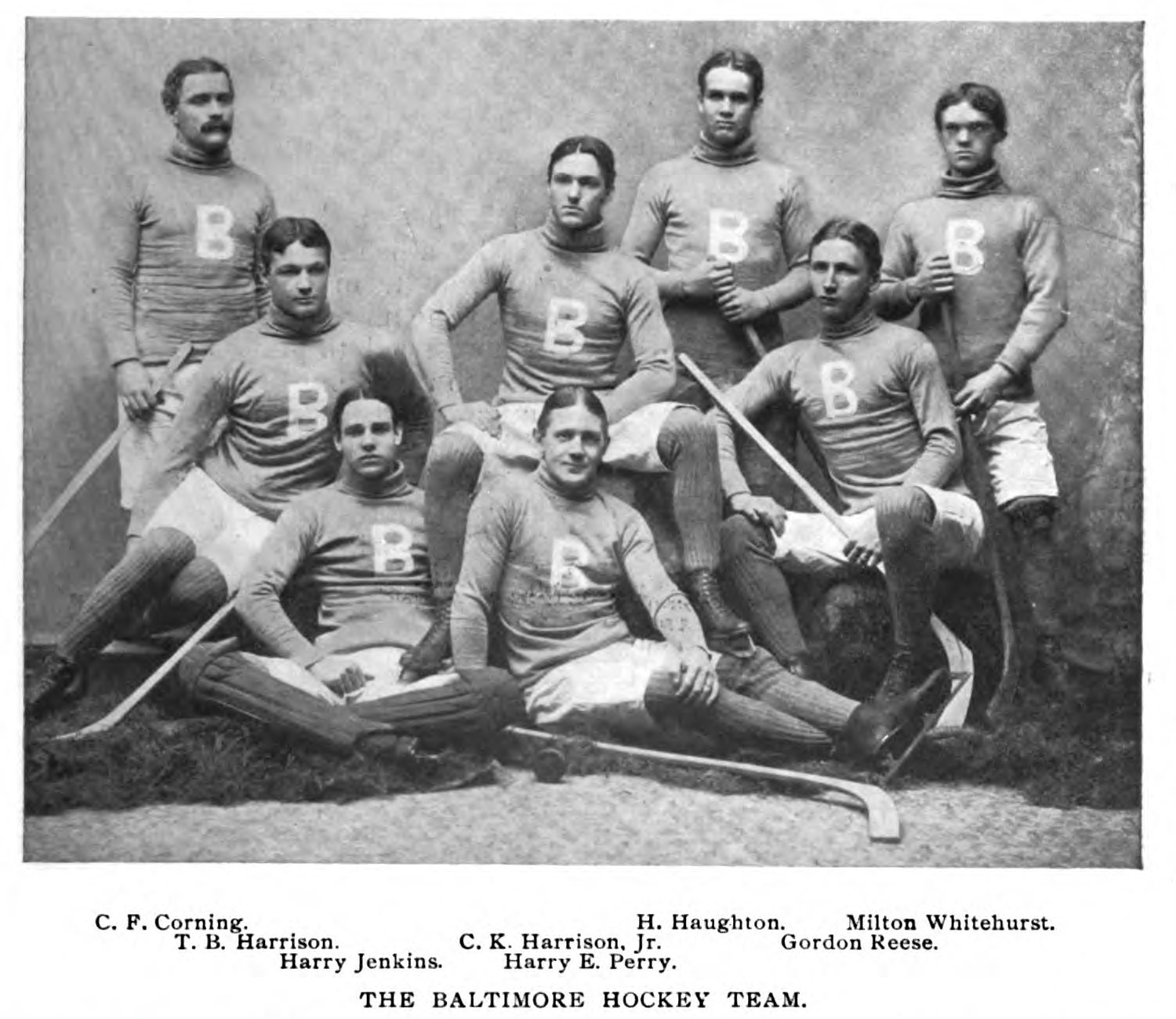
Baltimore Hockey Club in 1896–97

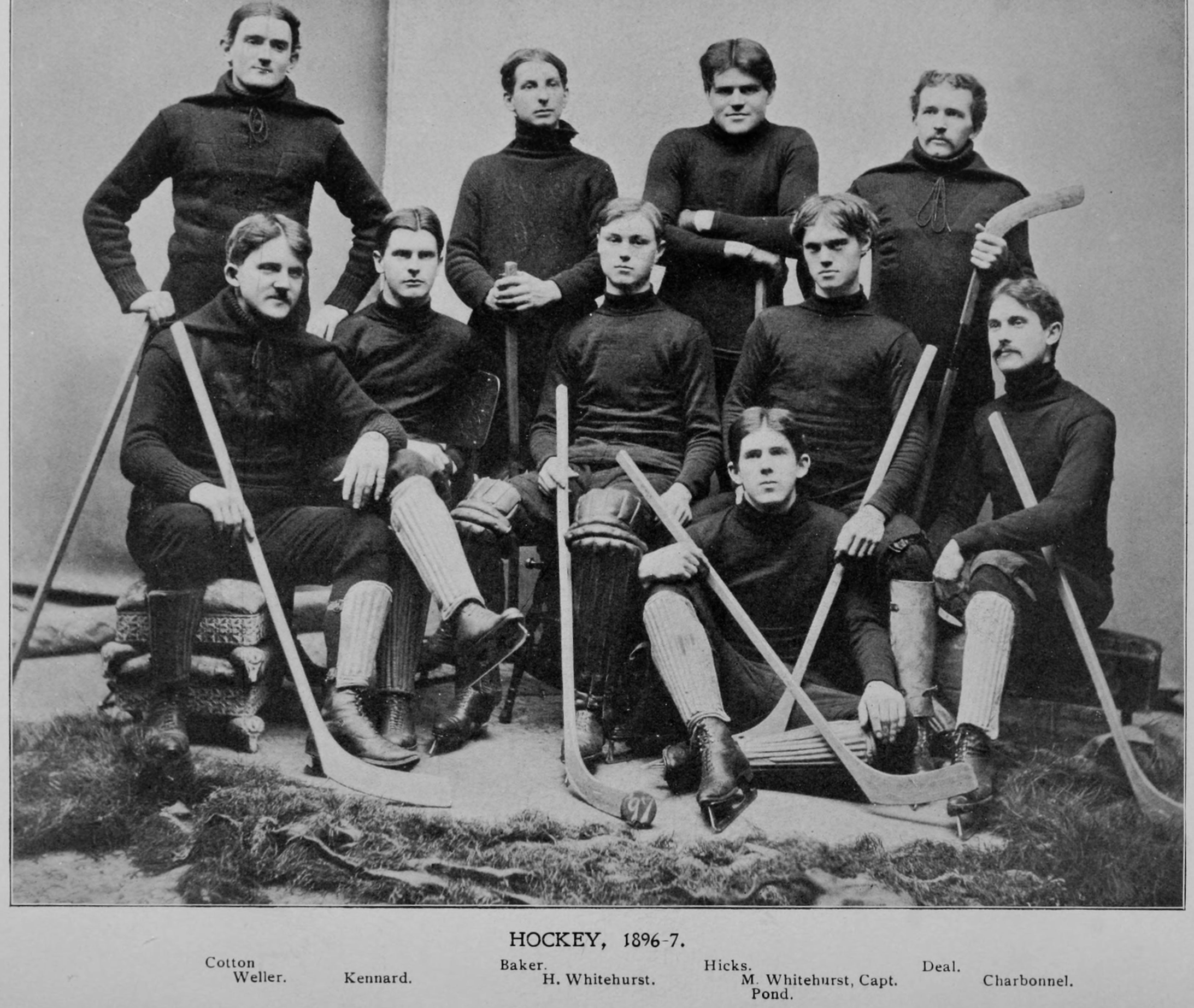
University of Maryland hockey team in 1896–97
