= Pennsylvania College of Dental Surgery =

College in Philadelphia, Pennsylvania (1856–1909)

The Pennsylvania College of Dental Surgery, sometimes referred to informally as the Pennsylvania Dental College, was founded in 1856 in Philadelphia, Pennsylvania and was the second-oldest operating school of dentistry in the United States by the time of its closing in 1909. From its faculty came what are today the dental schools of Temple University and the University of Pennsylvania.

== History ==
The school was founded in 1856 with Henry C. Carey as president, and using many of the faculty of the defunct Philadelphia College of Dental Surgery, which had been founded about four years earlier but had recently closed. Carey continued as president until his death in 1879.

The school's first location was 528 Arch Street, where its predecessor institution had been located, and in some ways the school can be considered an effective successor of that earlier school. In 1863, the school experienced a bit of a setback when some of its resources departed to found a competitor, the Philadelphia Dental College (which later merged into Temple University), and the school also moved to Tenth and Arch Streets. In 1878, another disruption occurred when the University of Pennsylvania began its own dental school. The university had been unable to secure a merger with either of the existing two schools, but was able to entice away a majority of the Pennsylvania College of Dental Surgery's faculty (four out of six professors). The school relocated again during this change, to Twelfth and Filbert Streets, hired additional faculty, and did not seem to suffer from the event.

Henriette Hirschfeld-Tiburtius, born in Germany, became the first woman to take a full college course in dentistry at the school. Hirschfeld-Tiburtius graduated from the school in 1869. Fanny A. Rambarger became the second American woman to earn the degree of Doctor of Dental Surgery in 1874 when she graduated from the school.

In 1909, short of funds to modernize its equipment and enlarge its teaching staff, the school elected to close. Its remaining assets and records were given to the University of Pennsylvania School of Dental Medicine, effectively merging into the university.

== Notable alumni ==
- Edward Angle, orthodontist
- William Gibson A. Bonwill, dentist
- Truman W. Brophy, oral surgeon
- Rubén Bustos Sepúlveda, Chilean dentist and former intendant of Colchagua
- Harold Chapman, orthodontist
- Matthew H. Cryer, oral surgeon
- L. Adele Cuinet, dental surgeon
- John Nutting Farrar, orthodontist
- James Garretson, oral surgeon
- Milo Hellman, orthodontist
- Henriette Hirschfeld-Tiburtius, first female dentist in Germany
- John Henry "Doc" Holliday, dentist, gambler, and gunfighter in the Wild West
- Albert H. Ketcham, orthodontist
- John Mershon, orthodontist
- Willoughby D. Miller, dentist
- Robert H. W. Strang, orthodontist
- Barnabas Wood, dentist
