= Wuzhishan =

Wuzhishan may refer to:

- Wuzhi Shan, a mountain in Hainan, China
- Wuzhishan City, named after the nearby mountain
- Wuzhishan mountain, Hsinchu County, Taiwan
- Wuzhishan mountain, Taipei County, Taiwan
- Wuzhishan pig (“WZSP”), a breed of Chinese miniature pig
