= Dinosaur tooth =

Subject of dental study in paleontology

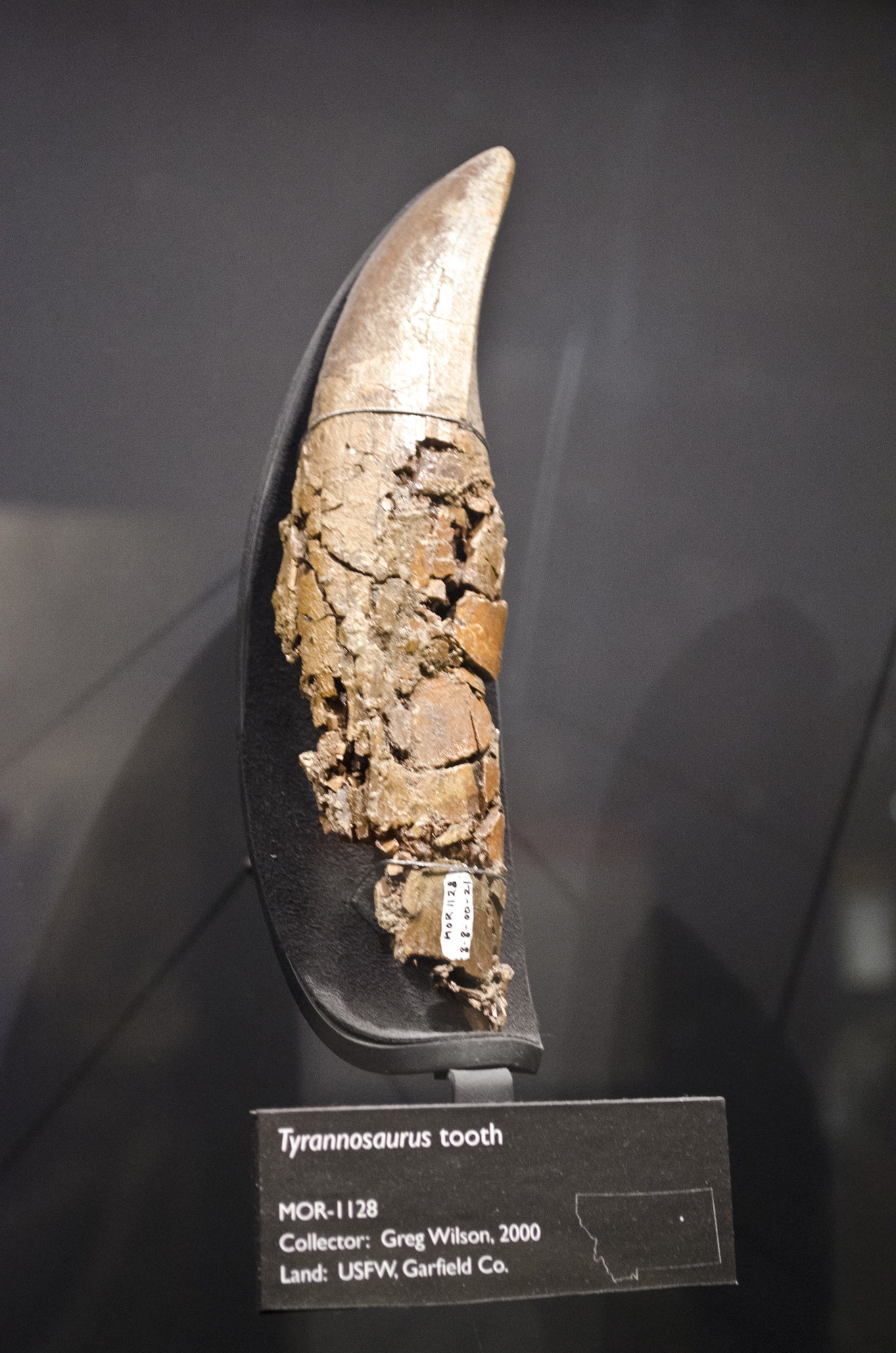
A tooth from a Tyrannosaurus

Dinosaur teeth have been studied since 1822 when Mary Ann Mantell (1795-1869) and her husband Dr Gideon Algernon Mantell (1790-1852) discovered an Iguanodon tooth in Sussex in England. Unlike mammal teeth, individual dinosaur teeth are generally not considered by paleontologists to be diagnostic to the genus or species level for unknown taxa, due to morphological convergence and variability between teeth and many historically named tooth taxa like Paronychodon and Richardoestesia are today considered nomina dubia, and are used as form taxa to refer to isolated teeth from other localities displaced considerably in time and space from the type specimens. However, it is possible to refer isolated teeth to known taxa provided that the tooth morphology is known and the teeth originate from a similar time and place.

Some of the most important anatomical information about dinosaur teeth is collected from polished, microscopically thin sections (histology), including the types of dental tissues present, tooth wear, tooth replacement patterns, how the teeth are attached, and the frequency of replacement. The actual material comprising a dinosaur tooth is not very different to teeth in modern animals. Most significant differences are in how the teeth fit together and continually regrew, with some examples shedding old teeth and others reabsorbing old teeth as they would grind down under chewing throughout a dinosaurs life.

== Background ==
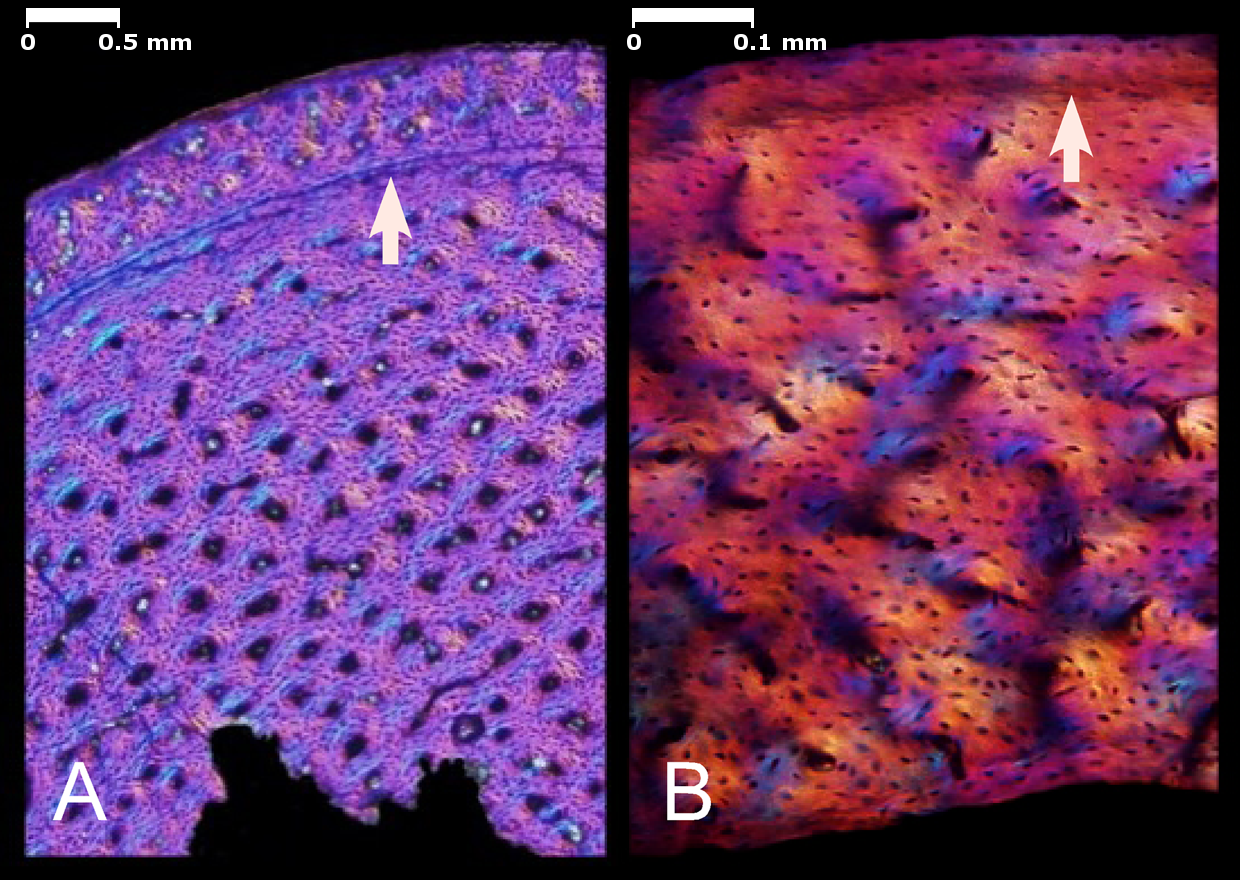
Bone histology of the non-avian dinosaur Shuvuuia and the early bird Confuciusornis

The use of histology in paleontology has traditionally been more focused on examining long bones such as the femur or the humerus. Previous work on long bone histology revealed differences in the growth patterns of polar dinosaurs, identified a case of dwarfism in Europasaurus, reconstructed the life history of Dysalotosaurus by examining multiple specimens of different ontogenetic stages, and suggested that Psittacosaurus underwent a postural change from a quadruped to biped as it matured.

By contrast, dental histology has not been looked at in great detail in dinosaurs until more recently and there has been an increase in interest in this particular sub-field. Histology studies traditionally rely upon the destructive process of creating and examining thin sections under microscopy, often restricting studies to taxa that have plentiful specimens such as isolated teeth or damaged specimens. While non-destructive means of analysis are sometimes possible through the use of scanning electron microscopy (SEM) or micro computed tomography, much anatomical information is difficult to obtain without creating thin sections.

== Histology ==
Histological study is microscopic examination, essential to revealing the most important aspects of dinosaur dental anatomy.

=== Selection ===
Different specimens will be suitable for looking at particular anatomical features. For example, specimens with teeth intact within the jaws are necessary to study tooth attachment as this information is lost on isolated teeth. On the other hand, isolated teeth would be sufficient if the goal is to examine wear on the tooth surface.

=== Embedding and sectioning ===
Thin sections are prepared by first embedding a suitable specimen in epoxy resin. The embedded specimen can then be mounted and cut with a precision saw. The resulting slice is attached to a slide and ground down, then polished, until it is thin enough, with a suitable surface to be examined with a microscope.

=== Examination ===
Thin sections are typically examined with a petrographic microscope using plain light and cross-polarized light. Some structures are more easily visible and distinct using one type of light over the other due to differences in their mineral properties. Some specimens can also be examined with a SEM.

== Dental anatomy ==
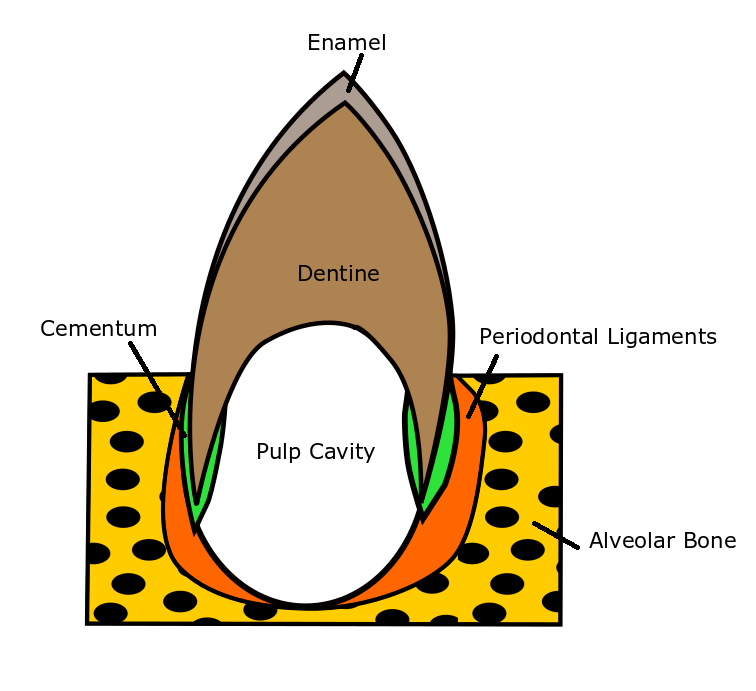
Cross section of a typical theropod dinosaur tooth in side view. All dinosaur teeth possess the same tissue types but can differ in their appearance.

Various major groups of dinosaurs have been examined through histology, these include the carnivorous theropods and herbivorous groups such as the sauropods, hadrosaurs and ceratopsians. Listed below are some of the dental anatomy that has been identified through histology and interpretations on their significance.

=== Tissue types ===
There are generally 5 tissue types present in dinosaurs, and these have been found to be identical to those of their closest living non-avian relatives, the crocodilians. One of the most significant findings is that despite differences in their appearance, dinosaur teeth are essentially composed of the same dental tissues found in modern mammals, crocodilians and other amniotes, suggesting that these tissues first evolved in a common ancestor and has been retained ever since.

1. Enamel - This is the hard coating on the outside of the teeth and typically appears as a clear, thin featureless band on the tooth surface when viewed in cross section. SEM analysis of the surface of dinosaur teeth revealed that their enamel form in prisms similar to mammals and that there is sufficient difference in the enamel microstructure to help pinpoint what group a tooth belonged to, sometimes to the genus level, when only isolated teeth are found. Not all teeth are covered by a prismatic enamel, and in most taxa, prisms are perpendicular to the outer surface of the tooth. Complex arrangements such as visible in mammals are rare. Diagenetic alterations modify the structure and composition of both enamel and dentin.
2. Dentine - This tissue makes up the bulk of the tooth and is characterized by long thin parallel tubules running throughout the body of the tooth.
3. Cementum - This tissue covers the root of a tooth and is an attachment tissue that forms part of the periodontium. It is typically infilled with Sharpey's fibers that help anchor the tooth in place in the socket.
4. Periodontal ligament - This is a soft tissue layer between the cementum and the tooth socket. While this is not preserved in fossils, there is always a mineral filled gap that is present in all dinosaur teeth between the cementum and the tooth socket, which infers the presence of soft tissue in life.
5. Alveolar bone - This is a type of bone that is typically spongy in appearance and forms the tooth socket itself.

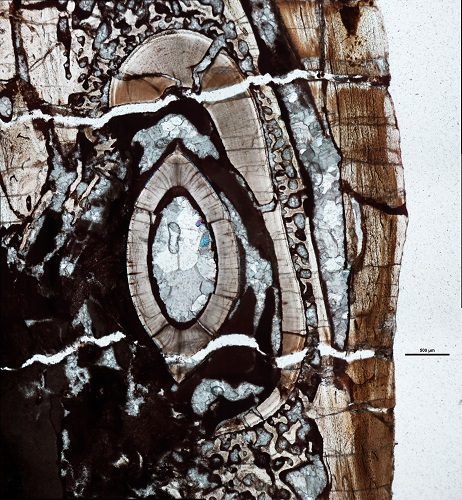
Top down view of a replacement tooth in Coelophysis growing up through the middle of pulp cavity in the older tooth.

=== Growth ===
In some examples viewed in cross section, growth lines can be observed in the dentine of dinosaur teeth. These are known as lines of von Ebner and represent daily deposition of dentine. Counting these lines provides the age of a tooth and comparing the age of the mature tooth to the replacement tooth in a socket provides an estimate of the tooth replacement rate.

The difference in age between the oldest teeth and the youngest teeth is used to determine the rate of tooth replacement.

=== Tooth replacement pattern ===
Many dinosaur teeth have been found to have a replacement pattern similar to other reptiles where a replacement tooth grows in the dental lamina on the inside of the jaw before migrating outwards, resorbing part of the growing functional tooth, until ready to erupt and replace it.

=== Tooth attachment ===
The tooth attachment mode of some dinosaurs has been referred to as thecodonty. This is a condition where the tooth is deeply implanted into the tooth socket with periodontal ligament present, as is the case in crocodilians and mammals. In mammals, thecodonty is associated with dental occlusion while in crocodilians it has been proposed as a means to reduce stresses from bite forces. Coelophysis possessed neither dental occlusion nor a strong bite, raising questions as to why it possesses thecodonty.

=== Dental batteries ===
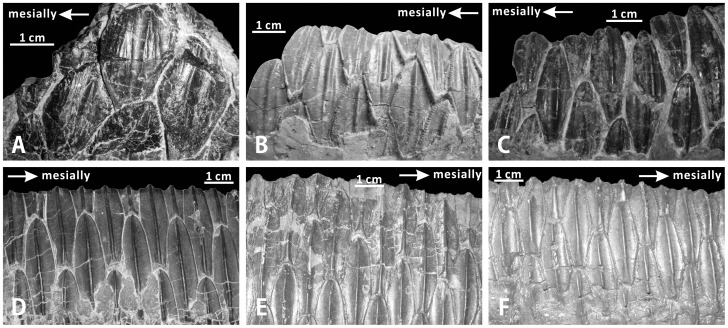
Close up of hadrosauridae dental batteries in various Hadrosaurid dinosaurs

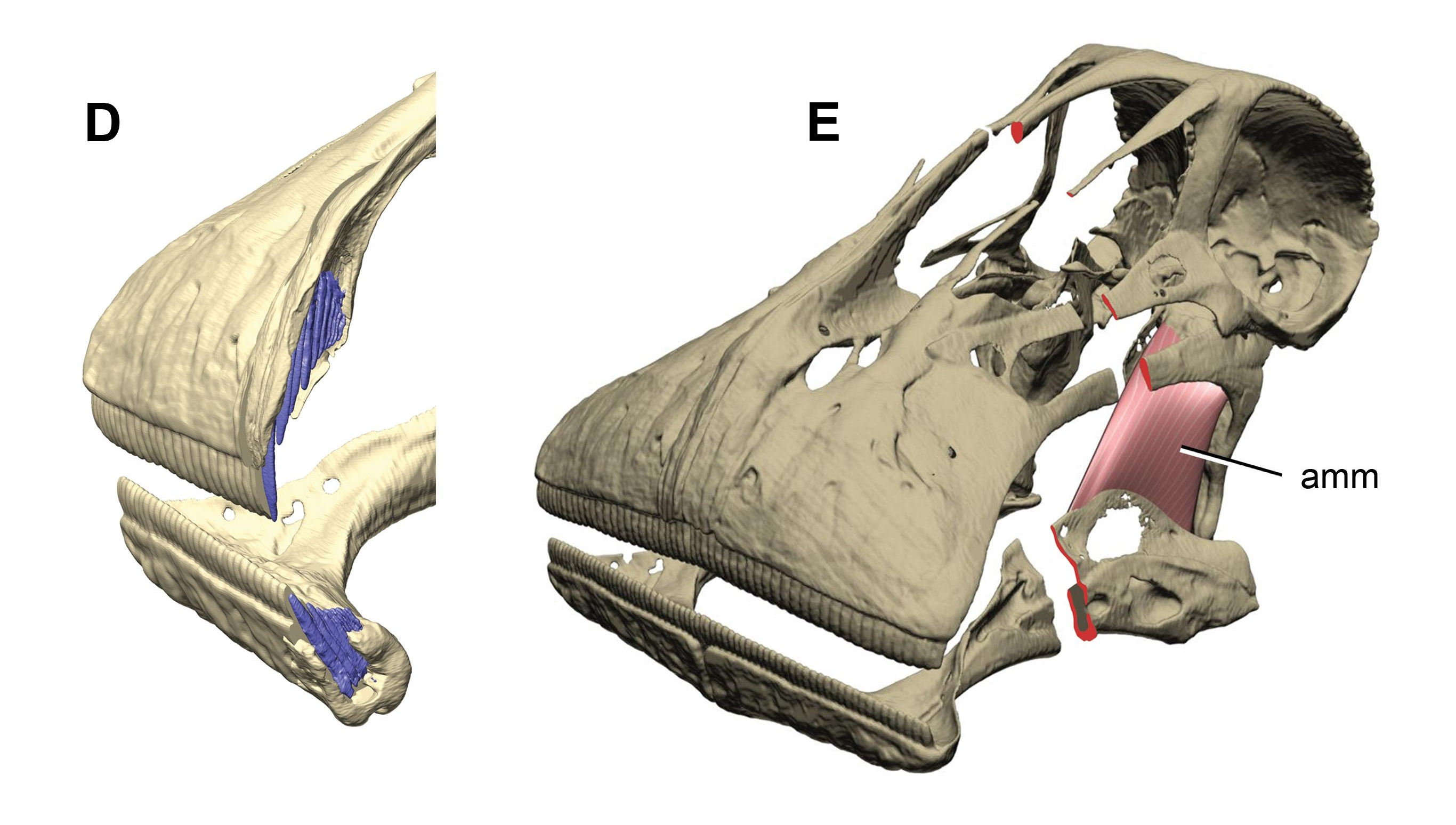
Diagram showing the dental battery in the rebbachisaurid genus Nigersaurus

One of the most complex dentition found in dinosaurs are the dental batteries present in hadrosaurs (whose members were dominant species across the planet), Neoceratopsia (for example, Triceratops), and Rebbachisauridae.

These batteries were formed from hundreds of teeth which were stacked in rows upon rows and formed a grinding surface to process plant foods. Histological study of these batteries found that they were not cemented together as previously thought, but that each tooth in the battery was separately moving and supported by ligamenture such that the whole structure was flexible. Comparable to shark teeth, dental batteries exhibited polyphyodonty, growing new teeth on the inside which migrated over time to replace the outer teeth. Unlike sharks however, who lose all of their old teeth, teeth in the rapidly growing dental battery would wear completely down and be reabsorbed by the renewing structure around it.

The batteries were formed by the teeth growing fast and maturing early, to the point that the pulp cavity of individual teeth—usually filled with cells and connective tissue—were totally filled with dentine before it even erupted. The lack of pulp in the tooth post-eruption means that the tooth was essentially dead and able to be completely worn away through use, and replaced without the risk of exposing the normally sensitive dental pulp to infection and pain. While other dinosaurs, such as some ceratopsians and sauropods, also possessed dental batteries, they all evolved independently and differ in some form or function from those of hadrosaurs. This shows that some dinosaurs had evolved extremely sophisticated chewing capabilities.
