= Göttingen Minipig =

German breed of miniature pig

- A sow

- A boar
- Other names: Göttingen Miniature; Göttinger Miniaturschwein; Göttinger Minischwein
- Country of origin: Germany

Traits

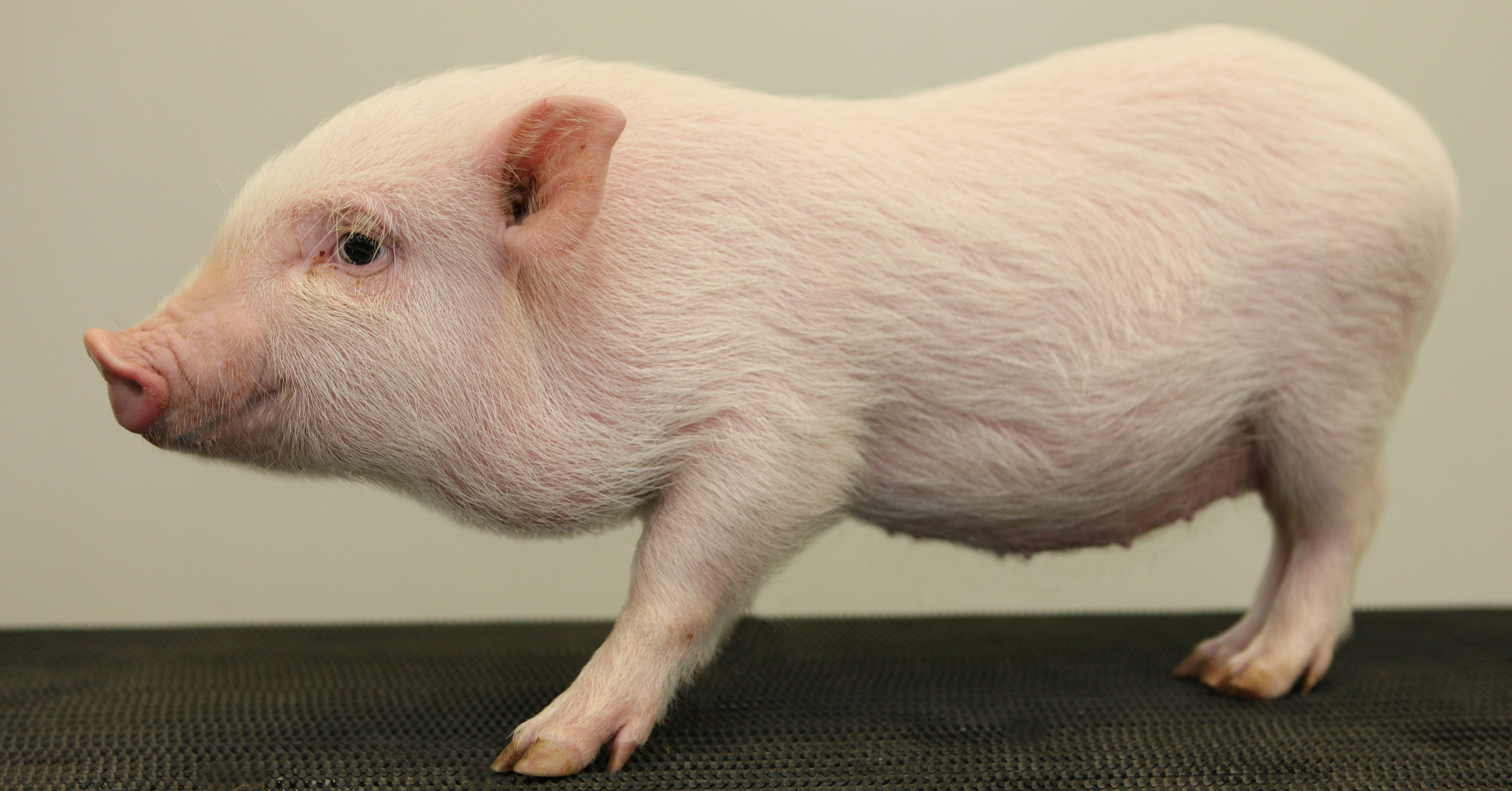
A piglet

The Göttingen Minipig or Göttingen Miniature is a German breed of miniature pig, bred for use as a laboratory animal in biomedical research. The pigs usually weigh about 45 kg when full-grown.

Raising of this breed began in the late 1960s at the Institute of Animal Breeding and Genetics (Institut für Tierzucht und Haustiergenetik) at the University of Göttingen, Germany, by crossbreeding the Minnesota Miniature, the Vietnamese Pot-bellied pig, and the German Landrace pig. Göttingen minipigs are highly favored as pets, however, the breed was specifically developed for biomedical research.

== History ==
The Göttingen Minipig was bred for use in biomedical research. Smaller pigs required less space and feed, were easier to handle, and required a lesser amount of the compound being tested.

The initial breeding was conducted by Fritz Haring at the Institut für Tierzucht und Haustiergenetik (Institute of Animal Breeding and Genetics) of Georg-August University of Göttingen, in Göttingen in Lower Saxony, which at that time was in northern West Germany. The foundation stock consisted of five Minnesota Miniatures – two sows and three boars – obtained from the Hormel Institute of the University of Minnesota in the United States, and seven Vietnamese Pot-bellied animals – four sows and three boars – from the Wilhelma Zoo in Stuttgart, in Baden-Württemberg in southern Germany.

Subsequent cross-breeding with the German Landrace produced the white/pink skin pigmentation which characterizes modern Göttingen Minipigs. Breeding goals included a low body weight, good ear veins, and low inbreeding coefficients.

In 1992, the first colony of barrier-bred, microbiologically defined Göttingen minipigs were derived in Denmark. From this colony, Göttingen minipigs were provided for biomedical research performed throughout Europe and to a limited extent in North America. Beginning in 2003, a colony of Göttingen minipigs were established in the United States. Since 2010, the breed has also been available in Japan. Global use of Göttingen minipigs for biomedical research has been increasing over the past two decades.

In the United States in the 2010s, Göttingen minipigs were soon purchased and bred locally to be sold as pets, in multiple locations. They are now a popular breed of pet pig, renowned for their small size.
