= Diphyodont =

Animals with two successive sets of teeth

A diphyodont is any animal with two sets of teeth, initially the deciduous set and consecutively the permanent set. Most mammals are diphyodonts—as to chew their food they need a strong, durable and complete set of teeth.

Diphyodonts contrast with polyphyodonts, whose teeth are constantly replaced. Diphyodonts also differ from monophyodonts, which are animals who have only one set of teeth that does not change over a long period of growth.

In diphyodonts, the number of teeth that are replaced varies from species to species. In humans, a set of twenty deciduous teeth, or "milk teeth", are replaced by a completely new set of thirty-two adult teeth. In some cases hypodontia or hyperdontia occurs, the latter in cleidocranial dysostosis and Gardner's syndrome. In the hare the anterior incisors are not replaced but the posterior smaller incisors are replaced.

Not much is known about the developmental mechanisms regulating diphyodont replacement. The house shrew, Suncus murinus, the Chinese miniature pig, mice, and ferrets are currently being used to study the diphyodont replacement of the deciduous dentition by replacements and additional permanent teeth.

Manatees, elephants and kangaroos differ from most other mammals because they are polyphyodonts.

== See also ==
- Heterodont
- Monophyodont
- Polyphyodont
- Schultz's rule
- Thecodont dentition
