= Yucatan Miniature =

American breed of pig

- Conservation status: FAO (2007): no data; DAD-IS (2026): unknown
- Other names: Micro Yucatan Miniature; Yucatan Micropig
- Country of origin: United States
- Use: laboratory animal

Traits
- Weight: Male: 83 kg; Female: 70 kg
- Skin colour: usually black or slate-grey; also white
- Hair: little or none

The Yucatan Miniature is an American breed of miniature pig. It was bred from about 1972 at Colorado State University, at Fort Collins in Colorado, from small Mexican pigs of the Birich sub-type of the Pelón or Mexican Hairless breed of the state of Yucatán. A much smaller pig, the Yucatan Micropig, derives from it, as does the Froxfield Pygmy of the United Kingdom.

== History ==
The Yucatan Miniature was bred from about 1972 at Colorado State University, at Fort Collins in Colorado, from small criollo pigs of the Birich sub-type of the Pelón or Mexican Hairless breed of the Mexican state of Yucatán; twenty-five of these pigs had been imported to the United States in 1960.

A considerably smaller pig – the Micro Yucatan Miniature or Yucatan Micropig, which has maximum body weight of about 40 kg – was bred at Fort Collins from Yucatan Miniature stock and one unusually small sow. The Froxfield Pygmy of the United Kingdom derives from cross-breeding of the Yucatan Miniature with small Vietnamese pigs.

No population data has reported to DAD-IS, and the conservation status of the breed is unknown.

== Characteristics ==
The Yucatan Miniature is almost or entirely hairless. The skin is usually black or slate-grey, but a white-skinned line has been developed. Average body weights are 70 kg for sows and 83 kg for boars.

== Use ==
It is used as a laboratory animal; the white-skinned line is used for research in dermatology.
