= Minnesota Miniature =

American breed of pig

- Conservation status: FAO (2007): extinct; DAD-IS (2026): not listed
- Other names: Hormel
- Country of origin: United States
- Use: laboratory animal

Traits
- Skin colour: either coloured or unpigmented

The Minnesota Miniature is an extinct American breed of miniature pig. It was bred from 1949 at the Hormel Institute of the University of Minnesota, at Saint Paul in Minnesota, and was for this reason also known as the Hormel. It derived cross-breeding of a variety of small feral pigs including some from Santa Catalina Island as well as stock of the Pineywoods Rooter of Louisiana, the Guinea Hog of Alabama and the Ras-n-Lansa of Guam.

== History ==
The Minnesota Miniature was bred from 1949 at the Hormel Institute of the University of Minnesota, at Saint Paul in Minnesota. The initial breeding was of various American feral pigs: some from Santa Catalina Island, as well as stock of the Pineywoods Rooter of Louisiana and the Guinea Hog of Alabama. From 1957 use was also made of stock of the Ras-n-Lansa breed of the island of Guam in the Mariana Islands; it was hoped that this would lead to a reduction in size. The final composition of the breed was about 49% Pineywoods Rooter, 22% Ras-n-lansa, 16% Catalina and 13% Guinea Hog.

The breed is extinct, but contributed to the development of several other breeds of miniature pig, among them the Czech White Miniature of the Czech Republic, the Göttingen Miniature of Germany, and the NIH Miniature and Sinclair Miniature of the United States.

== Characteristics ==
The Minnesota Miniature was a small spotted pig, with an average body weight of about 80 kg at 12 months old.

== Use ==
It was bred as a laboratory animal for biomedical research.
