= Miniature pig =

Small domestic pig

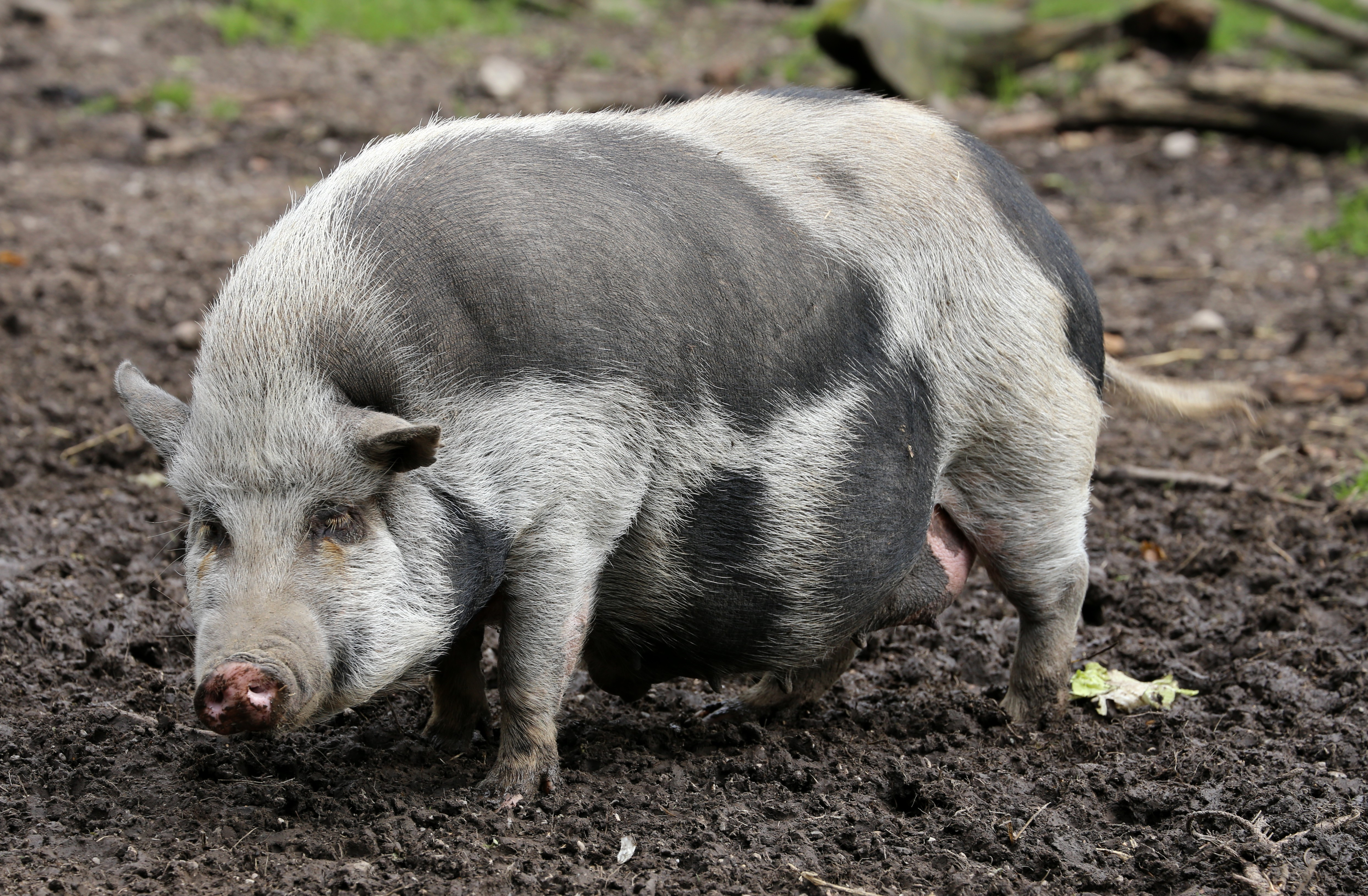
Pot bellied pig

A miniature pig, minipig or micro-pig is a domestic pig characterised by its unusually small size when fully grown. Some breeds of miniature pig – such as the Cerdo Cuino of Mexico, the Lon I of Vietnam, the Ras-n-Lansa of Guam in the Marianas Islands and the Wuzhishan of Hainan Island in China – are traditional breeds of those areas. Many others have been selectively bred since the mid-twentieth century specifically for laboratory use in biomedical research; among these are the Clawn and the Ohmini of Japan, the Czech Minipig, the German Göttingen Minipig, the Lee-Sung of Taiwan, the Russian Minisib, the extinct Minnesota Miniature of the United States and the Westran of Australia. Some minipigs have been bred to be marketed as companion animals.

Miniature pigs generally reach their full size in about four years, and may live for up to fifteen. Some may reach a height of 50 cm (20 in) at the shoulder and a body length of 100 cm (40 in).

== History ==
Domestic pigs of very small size have traditionally been reared in many countries in Asia – among them China, Laos, Taiwan, Tibet and Vietnam – in Central and South America, and in West Africa. Some oceanic islands have populations of small pig, which in some cases are feral.

In the mid-twentieth century, researchers began selective breeding of pigs for small size with the aim of creating animals suitable for laboratory use.

From about 1942 various strains of small pig were imported from Manchuria to Japan; from 1945 Hiroshi Ohmi selected these for small size, leading to the creation of the Ohmini, which was used both as a laboratory animal and for meat.

The Minnesota Miniature was bred at the Hormel Institute of the University of Minnesota from 1949, from a stock of Piney Woods, Guinea Hog and wild boar from the United States and Ras-n-lansa from Guam.

In the 1960s some pigs of the traditional Vietnamese Lon I breed were imported to western Europe for exhibition in zoos; some of these were later taken to North America, where they contributed to the development of the Vietnamese Pot-bellied type.

From the late 1960s, researchers at the Institut für Tierzucht und Haustiergenetik or Institute of Animal Breeding and Genetics of the University of Göttingen in Lower Saxony cross-bred these Vietnamese pigs with Minnesota Miniature and German Landrace stock to produce the Göttingen Minipig.

Pigs of this kind were later used for medical research in the fields of toxicology, pharmacology, pulmonology, cardiology, aging, and as a source of organs for organ transplantation.

== Use ==
Miniature pigs have been used for medical research, including toxicology, pharmacology, experimental surgery, pulmonology, cardiology, xenotransplantation, orthopedic procedures and aging studies. Mini pigs are mainly used for biochemical, anatomical, and physiological similarities to humans. They are also quick to develop, making it easier to breed and have more genomic background compared to other animal models of toxicology. Today, more than 60,000 pigs are used for scientific research. For example, scientists are working on studying the possibility of utilizing pig hearts for human heart organ transplants, and work has been done to genetically modify the tissues of pigs to be accepted by the human immune system.

Miniature pigs are occasionally kept as companion animals, and some have been bred specifically to be marketed for this purpose. They may also find use in animal-assisted therapy.

== Breeds ==
Among the traditional breeds of very small pig are the following:

Local name(s)	English name if used	Country	. Notes	. Image
Ashanti Dwarf		Ghana		
Bakosi		Cameroon		
Bamaxiang		Guangxi, China		
Chin		Myanmar		
Cuino		Mexico	possibly extinct	
Diqing		Tibet	Diqing Prefecture	
Ghori		north-east India; Bhutan; Bangladesh		
Hezuo		Tibet	Gannan Prefecture	
Lanyu		Taiwan	Orchid Island	
Lon Co		Vietnam	central Vietnam	
Lon I	"Vietnamese Pot-bellied"	Vietnam	traditional breed, formerly numerous, now gravely endangered	
Mou Chid		Laos		
Mou Lat		Laos		
Ras-n-las		Guam		
Zàngzhu	Tibetan	Tibet		

Among the modern breeds created specifically for laboratory use are the following:

Name(s)	Country	Notes	Image
Clawn	Japan	bred from 1978 at Kagoshima University from Landrace x Large White, Göttingen Miniature and Ohmini	
Bílé miniaturní prase; Czech White Miniature; Miniature Pig of the Czech Republic		Czechoslovakia	from the 1980s
Froxfield Pygmy	United Kingdom		
Göttingen Minischwein; Göttingen Minipig	Germany	bred in the early 1960s at Göttingen University from small Vietnamese pigs and Minnesota Miniature; white variant developed by crossing with German Landrace	
Hanford Miniature	United States		
Lee Sung Miniature Pig	Taiwan		
Mini-Lewe	Czechoslovakia	1970s	
Minnesota Miniature; Hormel	United States	bred from 1949 at the Hormel Institute of the University of Minnesota in St Paul, from feral Guinea Hogs from Alabama, feral pigs from Santa Catalina Island, Pineywoods Rooter feral pigs from Louisiana and Ras-n-Lansa pigs from Guam; extinct.	
Munich Miniature	Germany		
Ohmini	Japan	bred from the 1940s from Manchurian pigs and Minnesota Miniature	
Westran	Australia	1976	
Yucatan Micropig			
Yucatan Miniature			
