= Mammal tooth =

Details of teeth found in many warm-blooded vertebrate animals

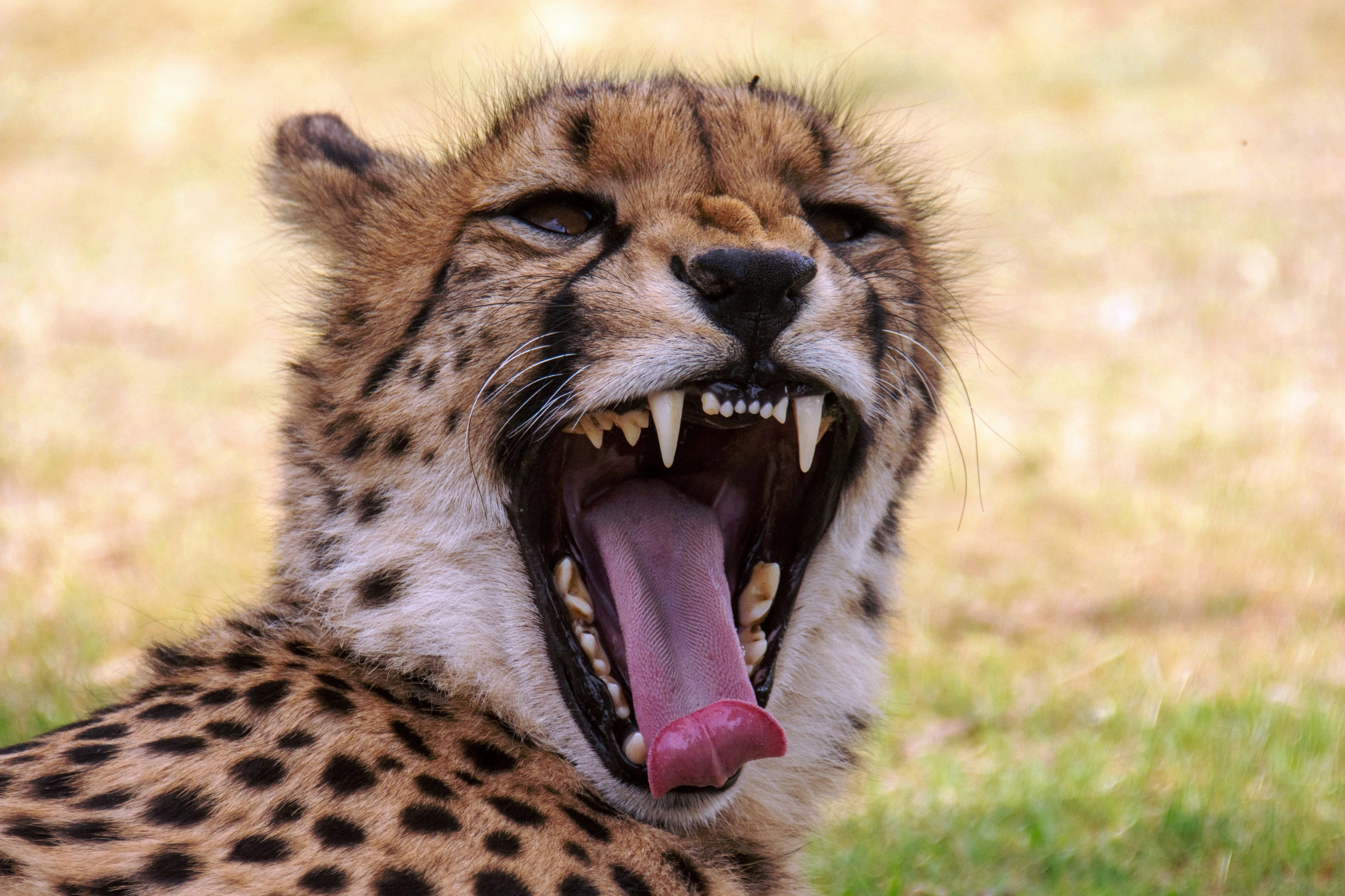
An adult cheetah showing its long, sharp canine teeth.

Teeth are common to most vertebrates, but mammalian teeth are distinctive in having a variety of shapes and functions. This feature first arose among early therapsids during the Permian, and has continued to the present day. All therapsid groups with the exception of the mammals are now extinct, but each of these groups possessed different tooth patterns, which aids with the classification of fossils.

Most extant mammals including humans are diphyodonts, i.e. they have an early set of deciduous teeth and a later set of permanent or "adult" teeth. Notable exceptions are elephants, kangaroos, and manatees, all of which are polyphyodonts, i.e. having teeth that are continuously being replaced.

Mammal teeth include incisors, canines, premolars, and molars, not all of which are present in all mammals. Various evolutionary modifications have occurred, such as the lack of canines in Glires, the development of tusks from either incisors (elephants) or canines (pigs and walruses), the adaptation of molars into flesh-shearing carnassials in Carnivora, and others.

== Diversity ==
The extant mammalian infraclasses each have a set dental formula; the Eutheria (placentals) commonly have three pairs of molars and four premolars per jaw, whereas the Metatheria (marsupials) generally have four pairs of molars and between three or two premolars. For example, the tiger quoll (Dasyurus maculatus) is a dasyurid marsupial native to Australia. The quoll possesses four upper incisors and three lower incisors per left and right-hand side [I = 14]; two upper premolars [PM] and two lower premolars per side [PM = 8]; and four upper and four lower molars per side [M = 16], giving the animal a complement of thirty-eight teeth. The tiger quoll's dental formula is therefore as follows: 4.1.2-3.43.1.2-3.4.

=== Rabbits ===
Rabbits and other lagomorphs usually shed their deciduous teeth before (or very shortly after) their birth, and are usually born with their permanent teeth. The teeth of rabbits complement their diet, which consist of a wide range of vegetation. Since many of the foods are abrasive enough to cause attrition, rabbit teeth grow continuously throughout life. Rabbits have a dental formula of 2.0.3.31.0.2.2. There are no canines. Three to four millimeters of tooth is worn away by incisors every week, whereas the posterior teeth require a month to wear away the same amount.

Anatomy of rabbit teeth

The incisors and cheek teeth of rabbits are called aradicular hypsodont teeth. Aradicular teeth never form a true root with an apex, and hypsodont teeth have a high crown to root ratio (providing more room for wear and tear). This is sometimes referred to as an elodont dentition, meaning ever-growing. These teeth grow or erupt continuously. The growth or eruption is held in balance by dental abrasion from chewing a diet high in fiber.

=== Rodents ===
Like those of rabbits, rodents' incisors grow continuously throughout their lives, and are both aradicular and hypsodont. Unlike humans whose ameloblasts die after tooth development, rodents continually produce enamel and must wear down their teeth by gnawing on various materials. These teeth are used for cutting wood, biting through the skin of fruit, or for defense. The teeth have enamel on the outside, which is often orange-yellow due to the incorporation of iron-containing pigments, and exposed dentin on the inside, so they self-sharpen during gnawing. On the other hand, continually growing molars are found in some rodent species, such as the sibling vole and the guinea pig. There is variation in the dentition of the rodents, but generally, rodents lack canines and premolars, and have a space between their incisors and molars, called the diastema region.

=== Afrotherians ===
==== Elephants ====
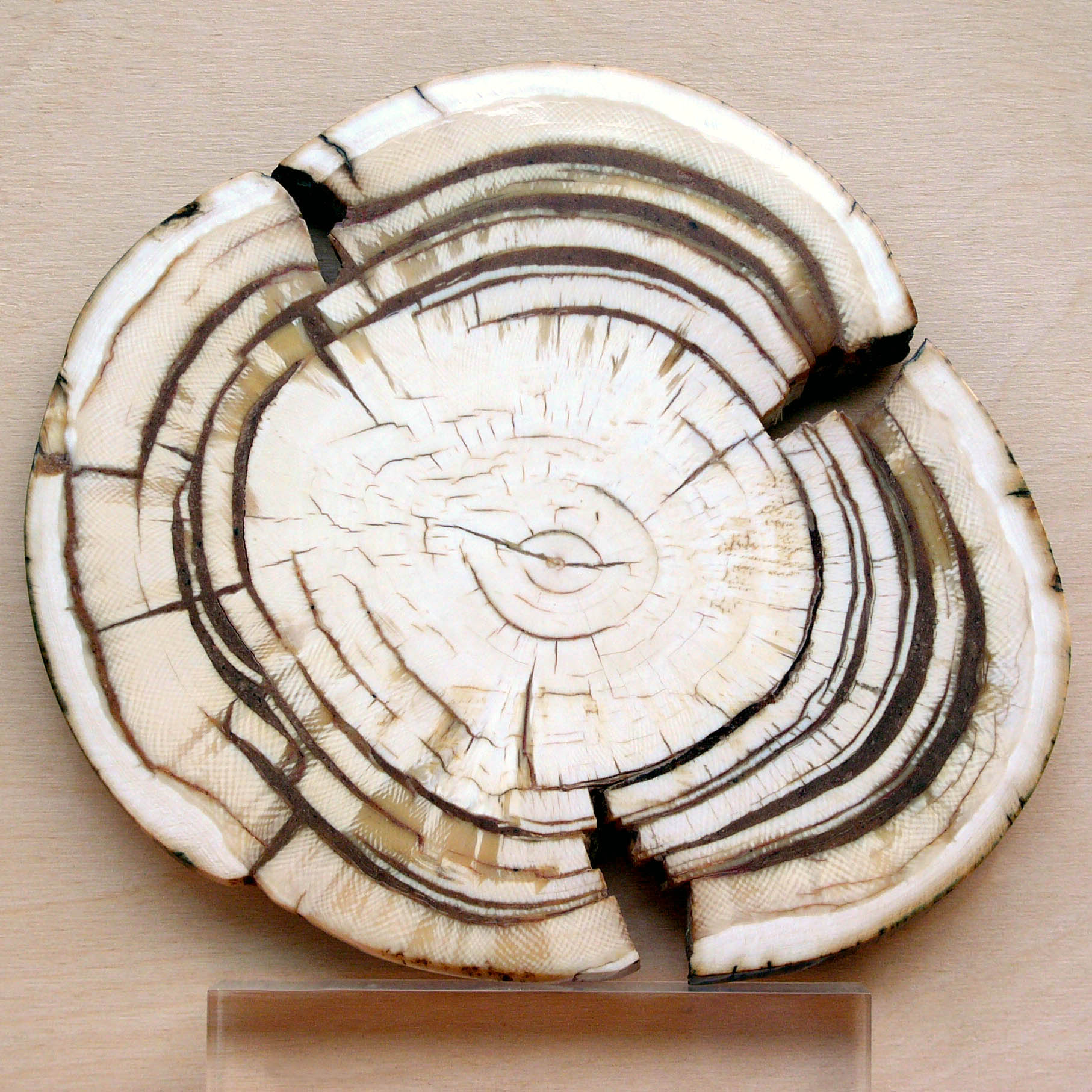
Section through the ivory tusk of a mammoth

The tusks of an elephant are specialized incisors for digging food up and fighting. Elephants are polyphyodonts whose teeth are similar to those of manatees, and it is notable that elephants are believed to have undergone an aquatic phase in their evolution.

Elephants have four molars, one on each side of the upper and lower jaw. Until age 40, these are replaced by larger molars. The new molars shift forward from the back of the jaw as the old wear down. The final set of molars last for about twenty years.

==== Manatees ====
Manatees are polyphyodonts with mandibular molars developing separately from the jaw and are encased in a bony shell separated by soft tissue.

==== Aardvarks ====
In aardvarks, teeth lack enamel and have many pulp tubules, hence the name of the order Tubulidentata.

=== Ungulates ===
==== Horses ====
An adult horse has between 36 and 44 teeth. All horses have twelve premolars, twelve molars, and twelve incisors. Generally, all male equines also have four canine teeth (called tushes) between the molars and incisors. However, few female horses (less than 28%) have canines, and those that do usually have only one or two, which many times are only partially erupted. A few horses have one to four wolf teeth, which are vestigial premolars, with most of those having only one or two. They are equally common in male and female horses and much more likely to be on the upper jaw. If present these can cause problems as they can interfere with the horse's bit contact. Therefore, wolf teeth are commonly removed.

Horse teeth can be used to estimate the animal's age. Between birth and five years, age can be closely estimated by observing the eruption pattern on milk teeth and then permanent teeth. By age five, all permanent teeth have usually erupted. The horse is then said to have a "full" mouth. After the age of five, age can only be conjectured by study of the wear patterns on the incisors, shape, the angle at which the incisors meet, and other factors. The wear of teeth may also be affected by diet, natural abnormalities, and cribbing. Two horses of the same age may have different wear patterns.

A horse's incisors, premolars, and molars, once fully developed, continue to erupt as the grinding surface is worn down through chewing. A young adult horse will have teeth which are 4.5-5 inches long, with the majority of the crown remaining below the gumline in the dental socket. The rest of the tooth will slowly emerge from the jaw, erupting about 1/8" each year, as the horse ages. When the animal reaches old age, the crowns of the teeth are very short and the teeth are often lost altogether. Very old horses, if lacking molars, may need to have their fodder ground up and soaked in water to create a soft mush for them to eat in order to obtain adequate nutrition.

==== Pigs ====
Tusks, which grow larger in males and in wild boars, are derived from the canine teeth, a trait shared with warthogs.

==== Cetaceans ====
The toothed whales, comprising the Odontoceti parvorder of the cetaceans, are differentiated from the baleen whales by the presence of their teeth. The number of teeth and their function can vary widely between species, with some dolphins having over a hundred teeth in their jaws, while the narwhal has two functional teeth in its upper jaw which grow into long tusks in males. The tusk is used in feeding, navigation and mating and contains millions of sensory pathways, making it the most neurologically complex tooth known. In contrast, the sperm whale has up to forty teeth in its bottom jaw and none functional in its upper.

=== Carnivorans ===
In the order Carnivora, many different diets are not always meat. Carnivores possess diverse carnassial teeth. The carnassials are specialized teeth for different diets of different animals. These teeth are used to cut through flesh. Either the molars or both the premolars and molars in combination may be adapted into shearing carnassials. Tooth roots can be great indicators of diets. In a study done on the bear tooth root area, it was found that the amount of space a tooth root took up was an indicator of the bite force required from the species. For example, Panda teeth had the deepest root systems because of their bamboo diet. Ursidae (bears) is not the only carnivorous family whose root area has been studied. It has been found that in general, carnivore tooth roots are highly dependent on their diets.

==== Walrus ====
Walrus tusks are canine teeth that grow continuously throughout life.

==== Dogs ====
In dogs, the teeth are less likely than humans to form dental cavities because of the very high pH of dog saliva, which prevents enamel from demineralizing.
