= Ironwood Pig Sanctuary =

Non-profit pot bellied pig sanctuary in Arizona

The Ironwood Pig Sanctuary is a non-profit pot bellied pig sanctuary located in Pinal County, Arizona, at Marana, about 30 mi (48 km) from Tucson. Its mission is to relieve the suffering of abandoned, abused, unwanted, or neglected pigs. It contains over 600 pigs on 31 acres (0.13 km^{2}; 0.048 sq mi).

== Foundation 2001 in response to the number of unwanted pigs ==
The sanctuary was founded and is maintained by husband and wife retirees Ben Watkins and Mary Schanz. Before opening the sanctuary, Schanz was a medical technician and animal rights activist. The owners of the sanctuary credit the swell of interest in Vietnamese pot bellied pigs during the 1980s and 1990s with the current number of unwanted pigs. They have noted that many customers were misled by pig breeders about the size the pigs would reach, and became unable to care for the full grown pigs. The first two pigs entered the sanctuary in June 2001.

== Living conditions for the pigs, health problems, and on-site graveyards ==
The pigs, which weigh up to 250 pounds (110 kg), spend much of their time in wading pools or mud baths located on-site, and are fed two cups of grain and a portion of hay each day. Many of the pigs are received obese, and are put on diets. Some of the animals that are donated already have severe health problems, such as arthritis or uterine tumors. The sanctuary contains three graveyards on-site. The pigs are not well-suited to the cold winters or the hot summers in the region, so volunteers and staff at the shelter have built numerous structures to keep them warm during the winter and numerous shade areas, wallows, and wading pools to keep them cool during the summer.

== Funding ==
The sanctuary is funded by donations, but also allows visitors to adopt pigs for a small fee. Their supporters have sold stuffed toy pigs as a fundraiser for their operations. The organization publishes a bimonthly newsletter, known as Ironwood Pig Sanctuary News, that typically profiles new swine arrivals, sanctuary progress, and facility upgrades.
