= Guinea Hog =

American breed of pig

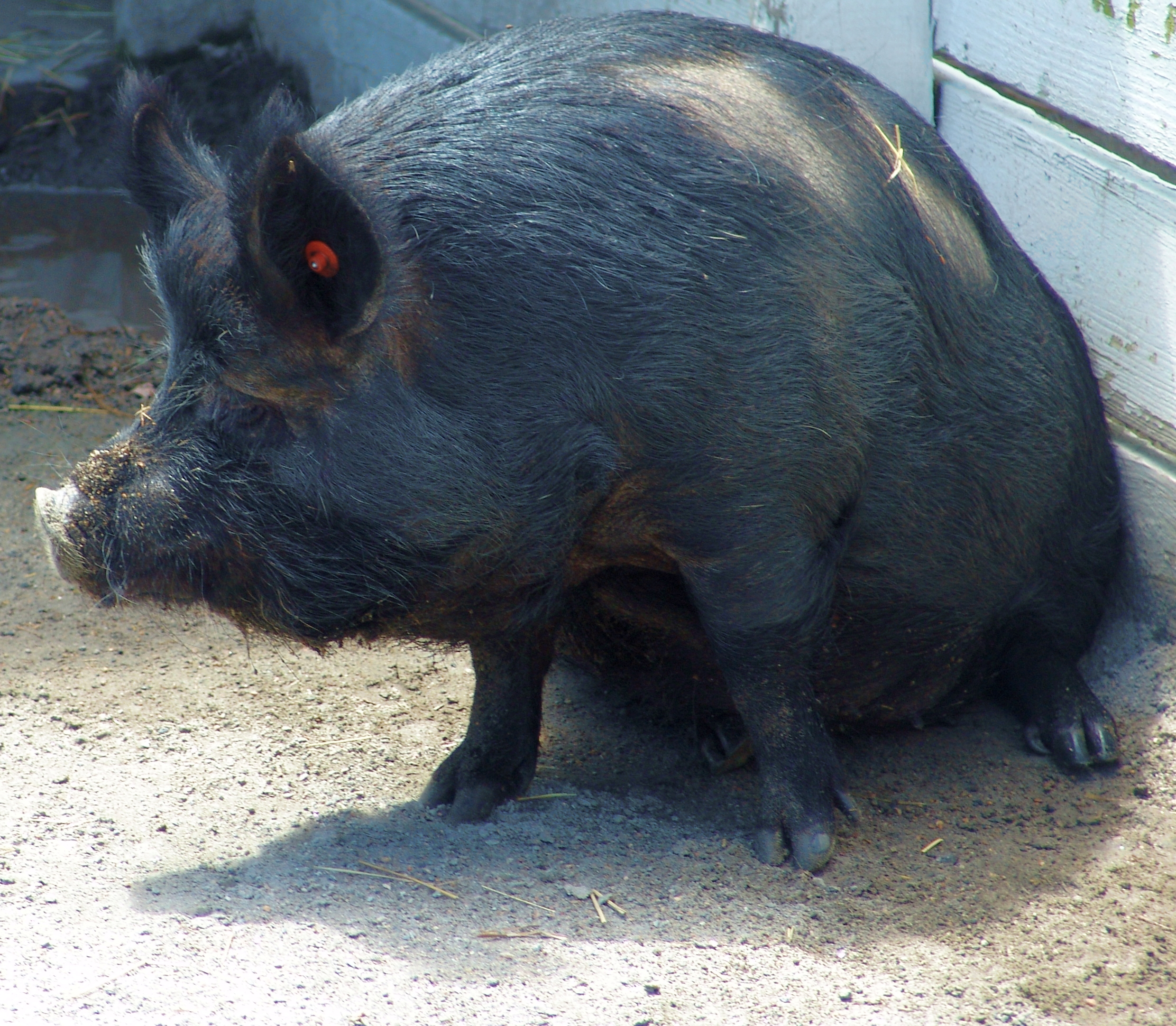
- At the Virginia Zoological Park

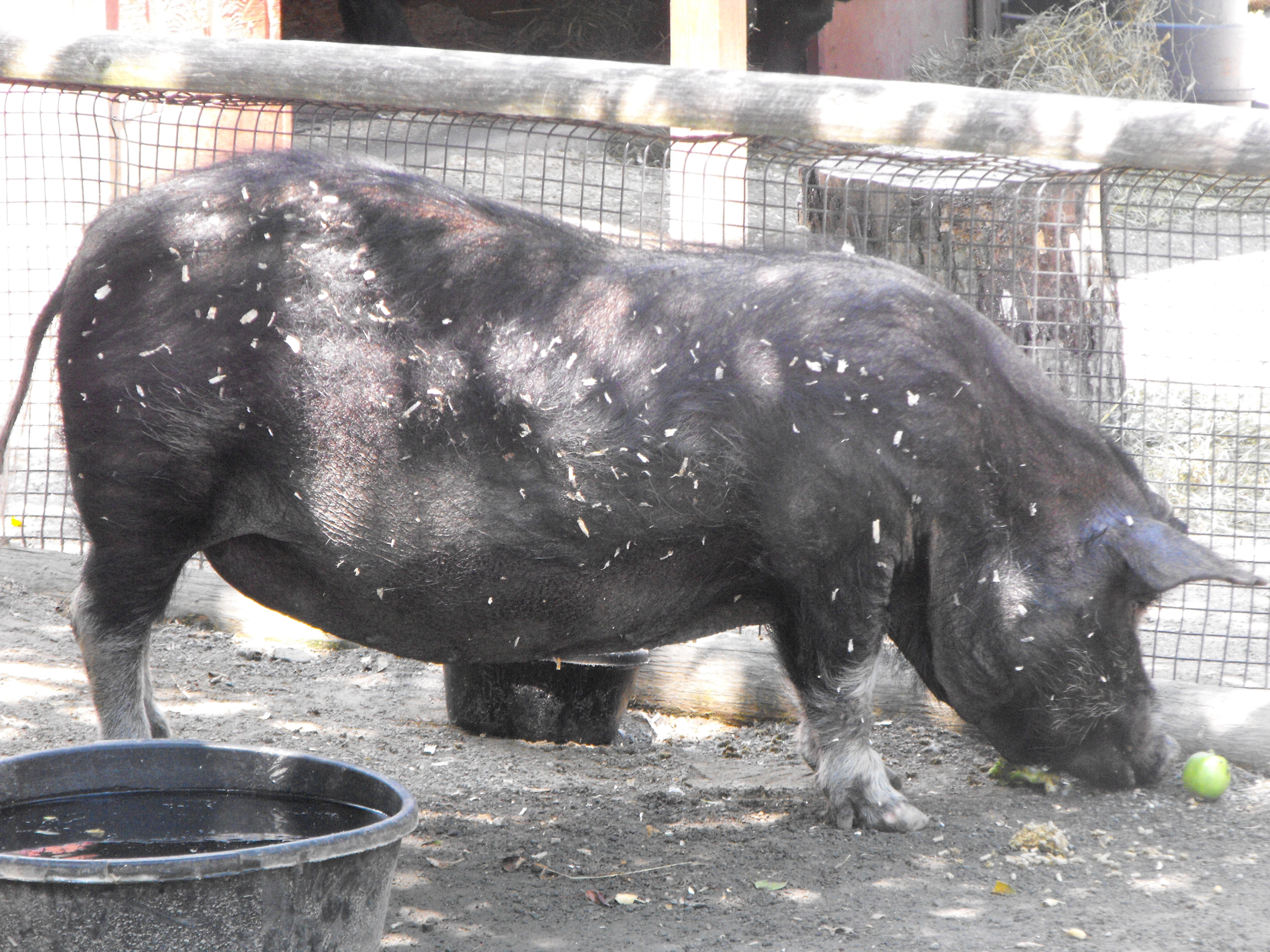
- At the Roger Williams Park Zoo
- Conservation status: FAO (2007): endangered/critical; Livestock Conservancy (2022): threatened; DAD-IS (2022): endangered
- Other names: American Guinea Hog; Acorn Eater; Guinea Forest Hog; Pineywoods Guinea; Yard Pig
- Standard: American Guinea Hog Association

Traits
- Weight: 69–135 kg (150–300 lb)
- Height: 38–51 cm (15–20 in)
- Hair: usually black

The Guinea Hog is an American breed of small black domestic pig originating in the south-eastern United States. It was formerly known by many names, including Acorn Eater, Guinea Forest Hog, Pineywoods Guinea and Yard Pig; it has since 2006 officially been named the American Guinea Hog. Its origins are unknown; a connection to the Essex pigs of eastern England has been suggested. It is unconnected to an older type of large red pig, also known as the Guinea Hog or as the Red Guinea, which was distributed in the north-eastern United States and disappeared in the late nineteenth century.

It is an endangered breed with a black coat, sturdy body, curly tail and upright ears.

There are two sub-types within the breed, a small-boned and a large-boned type, the latter having longer legs.

== History ==
The modern Guinea Hog is a breed of small black domestic pig of unknown origin. It is distinct from two other types of suid – both sometimes called by the same name – that may have reached the Americas from Africa. The African species Potamochoerus porcus – sometimes called "Guinea hog" – is reported by Georg Marcgrave to have been present in Brazil in the early seventeenth century. The large and bristly Red Guinea type of domestic pig of the north-eastern United States is documented from 1804 and is thought to derive from stock brought by slave ships from West Africa (perhaps via the Canary Islands); there is no mention of this after 1880, and it apparently merged in the late nineteenth century into the population of Jersey Red and Duroc pigs that would later combine to form the modern Duroc.

A distinct and different Guinea Hog – a small black pig with erect ears – was widespread in the south-eastern United States from the early nineteenth century. This traditional rural breed, suitable for extensive management on smallholdings and family farms, was first documented in 1811 and remained numerous until the second half of the twentieth century, when numbers fell heavily; by 2009 the whole population was estimated to number no more than 400 head.

A breed association, the Guinea Hog Association, was formed in 1991; in 2005 this became the American Guinea Hog Association. The Guinea Hog is included in the Ark of Taste of the international Slow Food Foundation.

== Characteristics ==
It is a small pig, with body weights varying from about 70 to 135 kg and heights between 38 and 51 cm. It has a curled tail and erect ears, but its morphology is highly variable in other characteristics such as the length of the snout and the type of bone structure. The coat is usually black, sometimes with white points to the tip of the snout and the lower legs, as seen in the Berkshire. Red and blue examples are documented in the past, and can still occasionally occur; blue coloration can also be caused by vitiligo.

== Use ==
Feral pigs of this breed from Alabama were used from 1949 at the Hormel Institute of the University of Minnesota, in St Paul – with feral pigs from Santa Catalina Island, Pineywoods Rooter feral pigs from Louisiana and Ras-n-Lansa pigs from Guam – in the development of the now-extinct Minnesota Miniature or Hormel breed of miniature pig.
