= Pineywoods Rooter =

American breed of pig

- Conservation status: FAO (2007): no data
- Other names: Gulf Pig; Pineywoods Guinea; Swamp Hog
- Country of origin: United States

Traits
- Hair: black

The Pineywoods Rooter is an American breed of small feral domestic pig distributed principally in Louisiana. It may also be known as the Gulf Pig or Swamp Hog.

It is not among the heritage pig breeds listed by the Livestock Conservancy; in the Ark of Taste of the international Slow Food Foundation it is treated as a synonym for the Guinea Hog of Alabama.

== Use ==
Feral pigs of this breed from Louisiana were used from 1949 at the Hormel Institute of the University of Minnesota, in St Paul – with feral pigs from Santa Catalina Island, Guinea Hog feral pigs from Alabama and Ras-n-Lansa pigs from Guam – in the development of the now-extinct Minnesota Miniature or Hormel breed of miniature pig.
