= Tooth =

Hard structure of the mouth

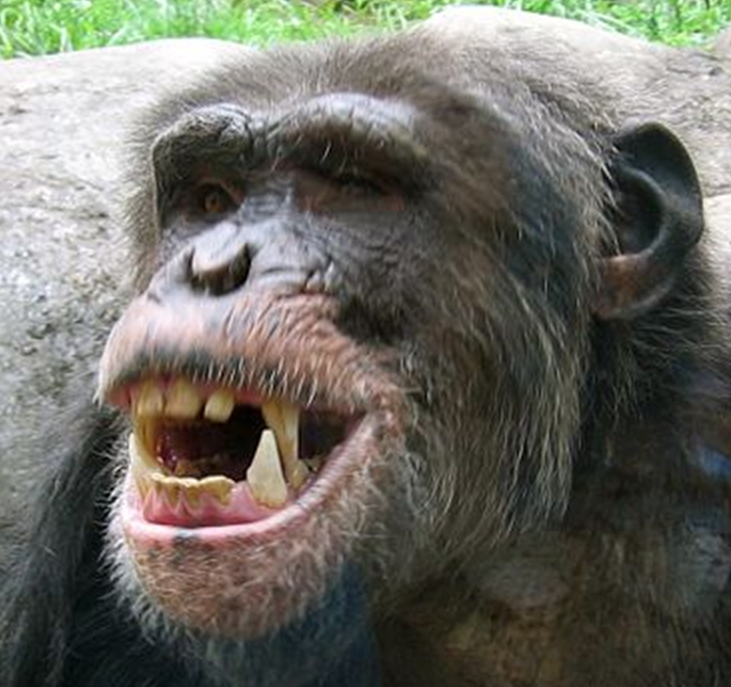
- A chimpanzee displaying his teeth

Details

Identifiers
- Latin: dens
- Greek: ὀδούς (odoús)
- MeSH: D014070
- FMA: 12516

A tooth (pl.: teeth) is a hard, calcified structure found in the jaws (or mouths) of many vertebrates and are used to break down food. Some animals, particularly carnivores and omnivores, also use teeth to help with capturing or wounding prey, tearing food, for defensive purposes, to intimidate other animals often including their own, or to carry prey or their young. The roots of teeth are covered by gums. Teeth are not made of bone, but rather of multiple tissues of varying density and hardness that originate from the outermost embryonic germ layer, the ectoderm.

The general structure of teeth is similar across the vertebrates, although there is considerable variation in their form and position. The teeth of mammals have deep roots, and this pattern is also found in some fish, and in crocodilians. In most teleost fish, however, the teeth are attached to the outer surface of the bone, while in lizards they are attached to the inner surface of the jaw by one side. In cartilaginous fish, such as sharks, the teeth are attached by tough ligaments to the hoops of cartilage that form the jaw.

Monophyodonts are animals that develop only one set of teeth, while diphyodonts grow an early set of deciduous teeth and a later set of permanent or "adult" teeth. Polyphyodonts grow many sets of teeth. For example, sharks, grow a new set of teeth every two weeks to replace worn teeth. Most extant mammals including humans are diphyodonts, but there are exceptions including elephants, kangaroos, and manatees, all of which are polyphyodonts.

Rodent incisors grow and wear away continually through gnawing, which helps maintain relatively constant length. The industry of the beaver is due in part to this qualification. Some rodents, such as voles and guinea pigs (but not mice), as well as lagomorpha (rabbits, hares and pikas), have continuously growing molars in addition to incisors. Also, tusks (in tusked mammals) grow almost throughout life.

Teeth are not always attached to the jaw, as they are in mammals. In many reptiles, amphibians and fish, teeth are also attached to the roof of the mouth (as well as to the floor of the mouth in many fish), forming additional rows inside those on the jaws proper. Some teleosts even have teeth in the pharynx. While not true teeth in the usual sense, the dermal denticles of sharks are almost identical in structure and are likely to have the same evolutionary origin. Indeed, teeth appear to have first evolved in sharks, and are not found in the more primitive jawless fish – while lampreys do have tooth-like structures on the tongue, these are in fact, composed of keratin, not of dentine or enamel, and bear no relationship to true teeth. Though "modern" teeth-like structures with dentine and enamel have been found in late conodonts, they are now supposed to have evolved independently of later vertebrates' teeth.

Living amphibians typically have small teeth, or none at all, since they commonly feed only on soft foods. In reptiles, teeth are generally simple and conical in shape, although there is some variation between species, most notably the venom-injecting fangs of snakes. The pattern of incisors, canines, premolars and molars is found only in mammals, and to varying extents, in their evolutionary ancestors. The numbers of these types of teeth vary greatly between species; zoologists use a standardised dental formula to describe the precise pattern in any given group.

== Etymology ==
The word tooth comes from Proto-Germanic *tanþs, derived from the Proto-Indo-European *h₁dent-, which was composed of the root *h₁ed- 'to eat' plus the active participle suffix *-nt, therefore literally meaning 'that which eats'.

The irregular plural form teeth is the result of Germanic umlaut whereby vowels immediately preceding a high vocalic in the following syllable were raised. As the nominative plural ending of the Proto-Germanic consonant stems (to which *tanþs belonged) was *-iz, the root vowel in the plural form *tanþiz (changed by this point to *tą̄þi via unrelated phonological processes) was raised to /œː/, and later unrounded to /eː/, resulting in the tōþ/tēþ alternation attested from Old English. Cf. also Old English bōc/bēċ 'book/books' and 'mūs/mȳs' 'mouse/mice', from Proto-Germanic *bōks/bōkiz and *mūs/mūsiz respectively.

Cognate with Latin dēns, Greek ὀδούς (odous), and Sanskrit dát.

== Origin ==
Teeth are assumed to have evolved either from ectoderm denticles (scales, much like those on the skin of sharks) that folded and integrated into the mouth (called the "outside–in" theory), or from endoderm pharyngeal teeth (primarily formed in the pharynx of jawless vertebrates) (the "inside–out" theory). In addition, there is another theory stating that neural crest gene regulatory network, and neural crest-derived ectomesenchyme are the key to generate teeth (with any epithelium, either ectoderm or endoderm).

The genes governing tooth development in mammals are homologous to those involved in the development of fish scales. Study of a tooth plate of a fossil of the extinct fish Romundina stellina showed that the teeth and scales were made of the same tissues, also found in mammal teeth, lending support to the theory that teeth evolved as a modification of scales.

In some fish and ancestrally in tetrapods, teeth are also present in the roof of the mouth (palatal dentition), in tetrapods these teeth have been lost in living mammals, birds, turtles and crocodilians, but are retained by lizards, snakes, the tuatara and amphibians.

== Mammals ==
Teeth are among the most distinctive (and long-lasting) features of mammal species. Paleontologists use teeth to identify fossil species and determine their relationships. The shape of the animal's teeth are related to its diet. For example, plant matter is hard to digest, so herbivores have many molars for chewing and grinding. Carnivores, on the other hand, have canine teeth to kill prey and to tear meat.

Mammals, in general, are diphyodont, meaning that they develop two sets of teeth. In humans, the first set (the "baby", "milk", "primary" or "deciduous" set) normally starts to appear at about six months of age, although some babies are born with one or more visible teeth, known as neonatal teeth. Normal tooth eruption at about six months is known as teething and can be painful. Kangaroos, elephants, and manatees are unusual among mammals because they are polyphyodonts.

=== Aardvark ===
In aardvarks, teeth lack enamel and have many pulp tubules, hence the name of the order Tubulidentata.

=== Canines ===
In dogs, the teeth are less likely than humans to form dental cavities because of the very high pH of dog saliva, which prevents enamel from demineralizing. Sometimes called cuspids, these teeth are shaped like points (cusps) and are used for tearing and grasping food.

=== Cetaceans ===
Like human teeth, whale teeth have polyp-like protrusions located on the root surface of the tooth. These polyps are made of cementum in both species, but in human teeth, the protrusions are located on the outside of the root, while in whales the nodule is located on the inside of the pulp chamber. While the roots of human teeth are made of cementum on the outer surface, whales have cementum on the entire surface of the tooth with a very small layer of enamel at the tip. This small enamel layer is only seen in older whales where the cementum has been worn away to show the underlying enamel.

The toothed whale is a parvorder of the cetaceans characterized by having teeth. The teeth differ considerably among the species. They may be numerous, with some dolphins bearing over 100 teeth in their jaws. On the other hand, the narwhals have a giant unicorn-like tusk, which is a tooth containing millions of sensory pathways and used for sensing during feeding, navigation, and mating. It is the most neurologically complex tooth known. Beaked whales are almost toothless, with only bizarre teeth found in males. These teeth may be used for feeding but also for demonstrating aggression and showmanship.

=== Primates ===
In humans (and most other primates), there are usually 20 primary (also "baby" or "milk") teeth, and later up to 32 permanent teeth. Four of these 32 may be third molars or wisdom teeth, although these are not present in all adults, and may be removed surgically later in life.

Among primary teeth, 10 of them are usually found in the maxilla (i.e. upper jaw) and the other 10 in the mandible (i.e. lower jaw). Among permanent teeth, 16 are found in the maxilla and the other 16 in the mandible. Most of the teeth have uniquely distinguishing features.

=== Horse ===
An adult horse has between 36 and 44 teeth. The enamel and dentin layers of horse teeth are intertwined. All horses have 12 premolars, 12 molars, and 12 incisors. Generally, all male equines also have four canine teeth (called tushes) between the molars and incisors. However, few female horses (less than 28%) have canines, and those that do usually have only one or two, which many times are only partially erupted. A few horses have one to four wolf teeth, which are vestigial premolars, with most of those having only one or two. They are equally common in male and female horses and much more likely to be on the upper jaw. If present these can cause problems as they can interfere with the horse's bit contact. Therefore, wolf teeth are commonly removed.

Horse teeth can be used to estimate the animal's age. Between birth and five years, age can be closely estimated by observing the eruption pattern on milk teeth and then permanent teeth. By age five, all permanent teeth have usually erupted. The horse is then said to have a "full" mouth. After the age of five, age can only be conjectured by studying the wear patterns on the incisors, shape, the angle at which the incisors meet, and other factors. The wear of teeth may also be affected by diet, natural abnormalities, and cribbing. Two horses of the same age may have different wear patterns.

A horse's incisors, premolars, and molars, once fully developed, continue to erupt as the grinding surface is worn down through chewing. A young adult horse will have teeth, which are 110–130 mm (4.5–5 inches) long, with the majority of the crown remaining below the gumline in the dental socket. The rest of the tooth will slowly emerge from the jaw, erupting about 3 mm (1/8 in) each year, as the horse ages. When the animal reaches old age, the crowns of the teeth are very short and the teeth are often lost altogether. Very old horses, if lacking molars, may need to have their fodder ground up and soaked in water to create a soft mush for them to eat in order to obtain adequate nutrition.

=== Proboscideans ===
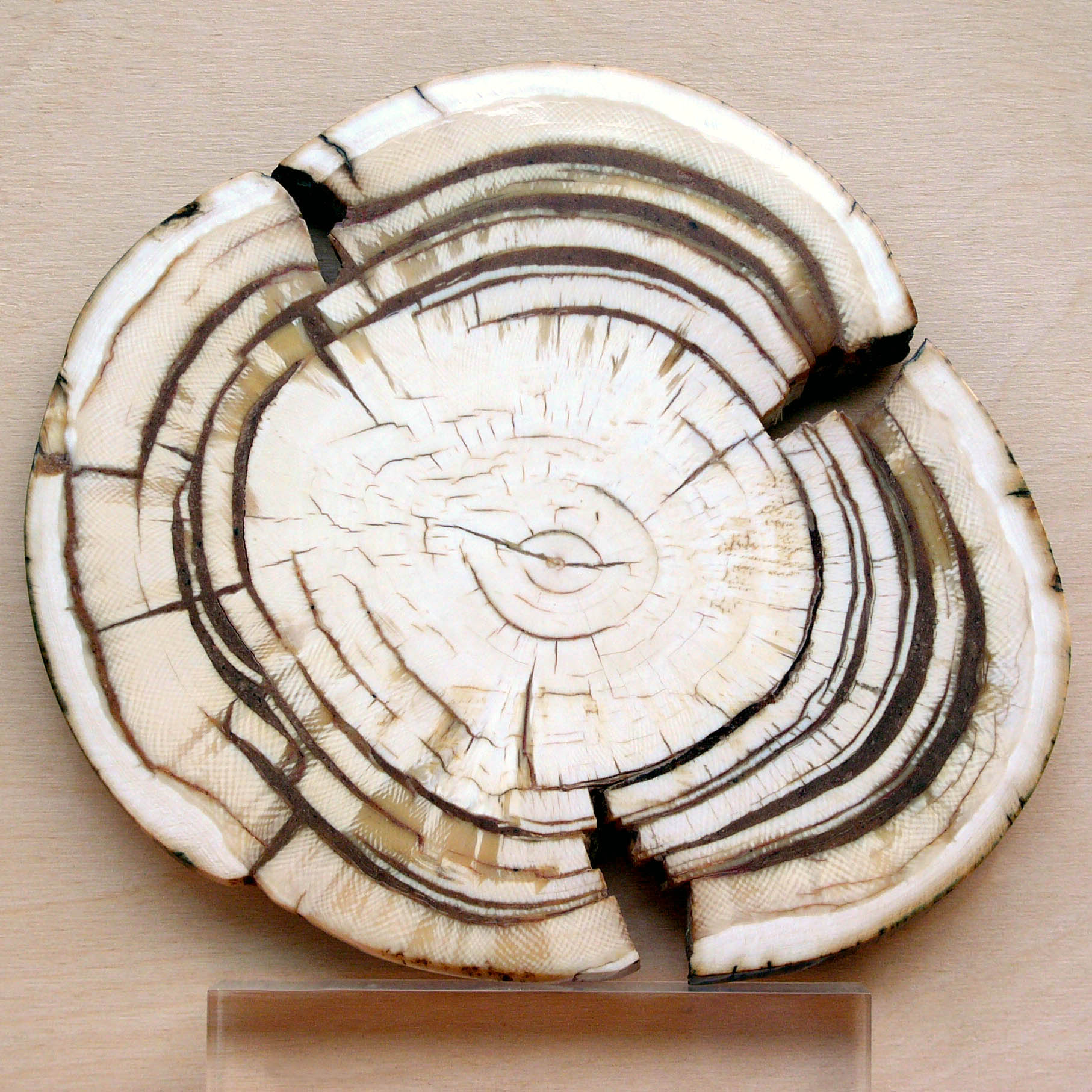
Section through the ivory tusk of a mammoth

Elephants' tusks are specialized incisors for digging food up and fighting. Some elephant teeth are similar to those in manatees, and elephants are believed to have undergone an aquatic phase in their evolution.

At birth, elephants have a total of 28 molar plate-like grinding teeth not including the tusks. These are organized into four sets of seven successively larger teeth which the elephant will slowly wear through during its lifetime of chewing rough plant material. Only four teeth are used for chewing at a given time, and as each tooth wears out, another tooth moves forward to take its place in a process similar to a conveyor belt. The last and largest of these teeth usually becomes exposed when the animal is around 40 years of age, and will often last for an additional 20 years. When the last of these teeth has fallen out, regardless of the elephant's age, the animal will no longer be able to chew food and will die of starvation.

=== Rabbit ===
Rabbits and other lagomorphs usually shed their deciduous teeth before (or very shortly after) their birth, and are usually born with their permanent teeth. The teeth of rabbits complement their diet, which consists of a wide range of vegetation. Since many of the foods are abrasive enough to cause attrition, rabbit teeth grow continuously throughout life. Rabbits have a total of six incisors, three upper premolars, three upper molars, two lower premolars, and two lower molars on each side. There are no canines. Dental formula is 2.0.3.31.0.2.3 = 28. Three to four millimeters of the tooth is worn away by incisors every week, whereas the cheek teeth require a month to wear away the same amount.

The incisors and cheek teeth of rabbits are called aradicular hypsodont teeth. This is sometimes referred to as an elodent dentition. These teeth grow or erupt continuously. The growth or eruption is held in balance by dental abrasion from chewing a diet high in fiber.

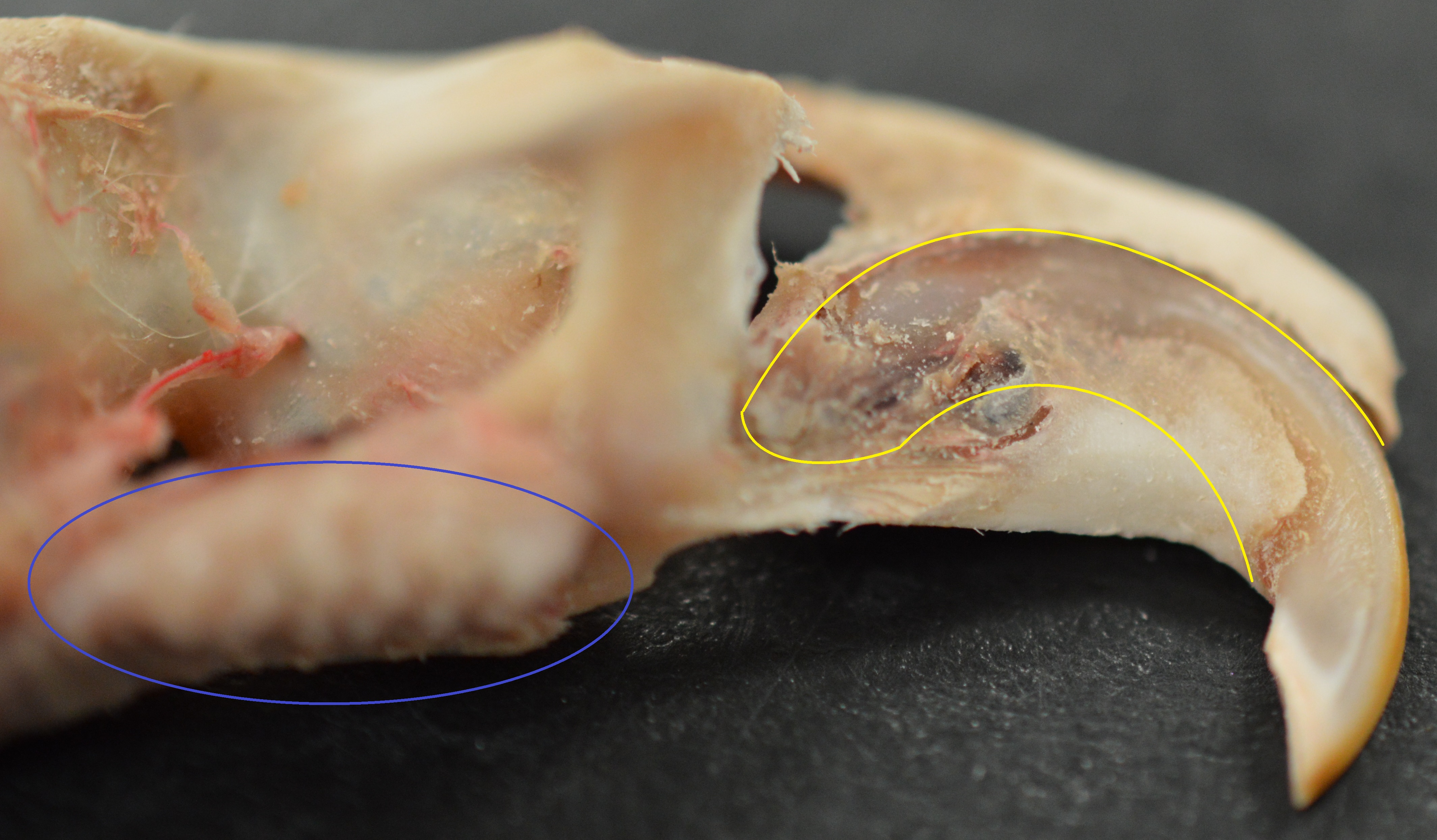
Buccal view of top incisor from Rattus rattus. Top incisor outlined in yellow. Molars circled in blue.

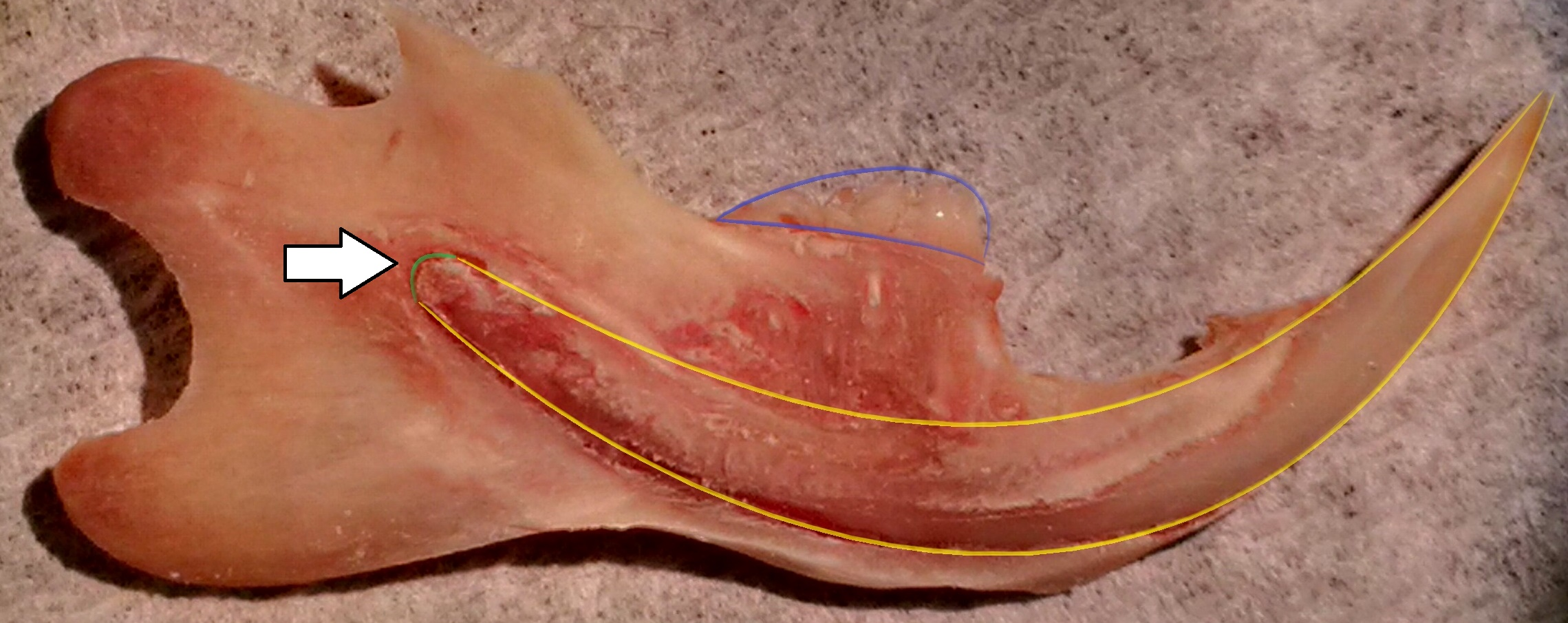
Buccal view of the lower incisor from the right dentary of a Rattus rattus

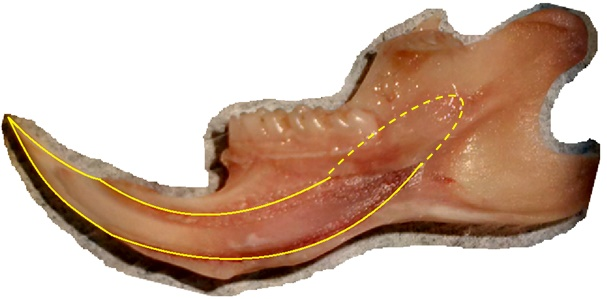
Lingual view of the lower incisor from the right dentary of a Rattus rattus

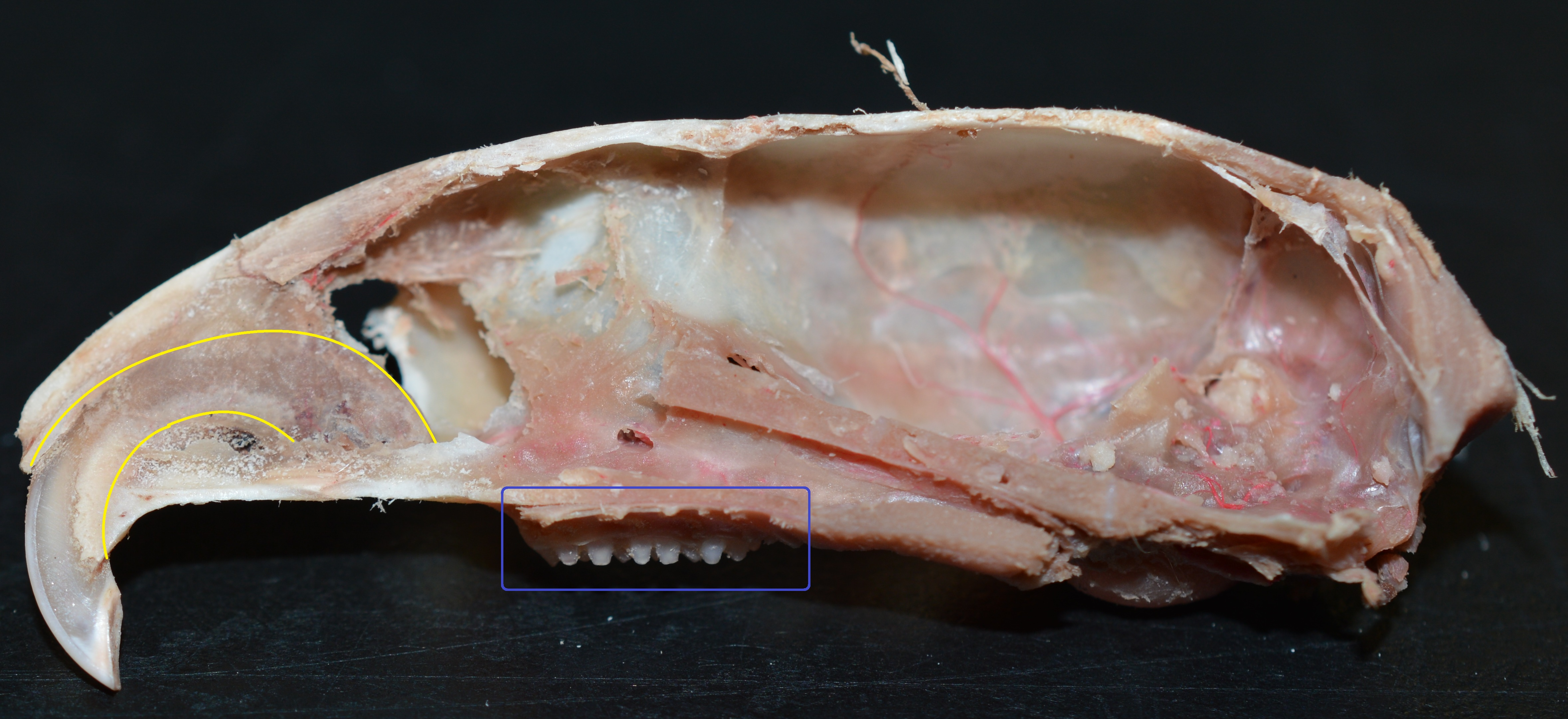
Midsagittal view of top incisor from Rattus rattus. Top incisor outlined in yellow. Molars circled in blue.

=== Rodents ===
Rodents have upper and lower hypselodont incisors that can continuously grow enamel throughout its life without having properly formed roots. These teeth are also known as aradicular teeth, and unlike humans whose ameloblasts die after tooth development, rodents continually produce enamel, they must wear down their teeth by gnawing on various materials. Enamel and dentin are produced by the enamel organ, and growth is dependent on the presence of stem cells, cellular amplification, and cellular maturation structures in the odontogenic region. Rodent incisors are used for cutting wood, biting through the skin of fruit, or for defense. This allows for the rate of wear and tooth growth to be at equilibrium. The microstructure of rodent incisor enamel has shown to be useful in studying the phylogeny and systematics of rodents because of its independent evolution from the other dental traits. The enamel on rodent incisors are composed of two layers: the inner portio interna (PI) with Hunter-Schreger bands (HSB) and an outer portio externa (PE) with radial enamel (RE). It usually involves the differential regulation of the epithelial stem cell niche in the tooth of two rodent species, such as guinea pigs.

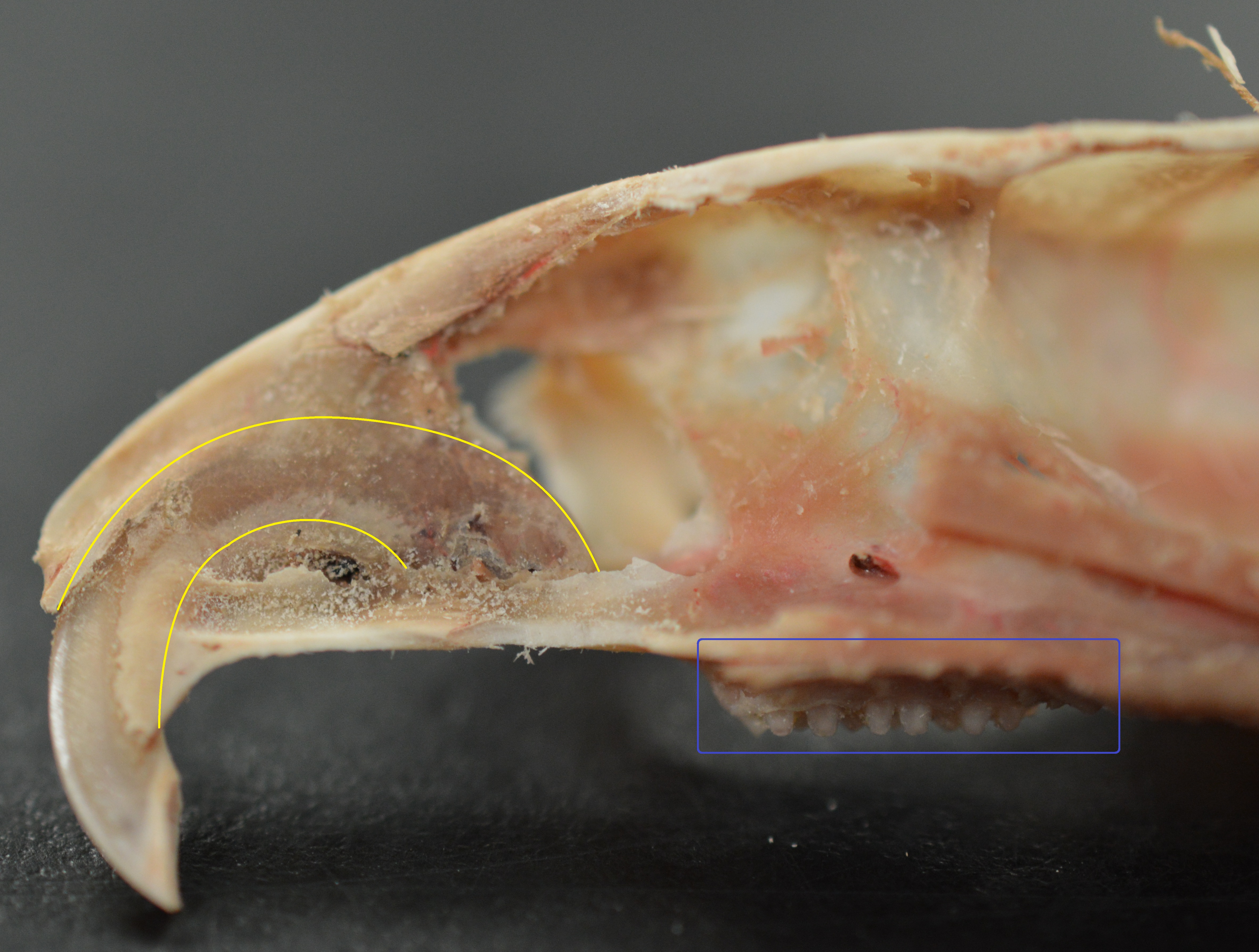
Lingual view of top incisor from Rattus rattus. Top incisor outlined in yellow. Molars circled in blue.

The teeth have enamel on the outside and exposed dentin on the inside, so they self-sharpen during gnawing. On the other hand, continually growing molars are found in some rodent species, such as the sibling vole and the guinea pig. There is variation in the dentition of the rodents, but generally, rodents lack canines and premolars, and have a space between their incisors and molars, called the diastema region.

=== Manatee ===
Manatees are polyphyodont with mandibular molars developing separately from the jaw and are encased in a bony shell separated by soft tissue.

=== Walrus ===
Walrus tusks are canine teeth that grow continuously throughout life.

== Fish ==
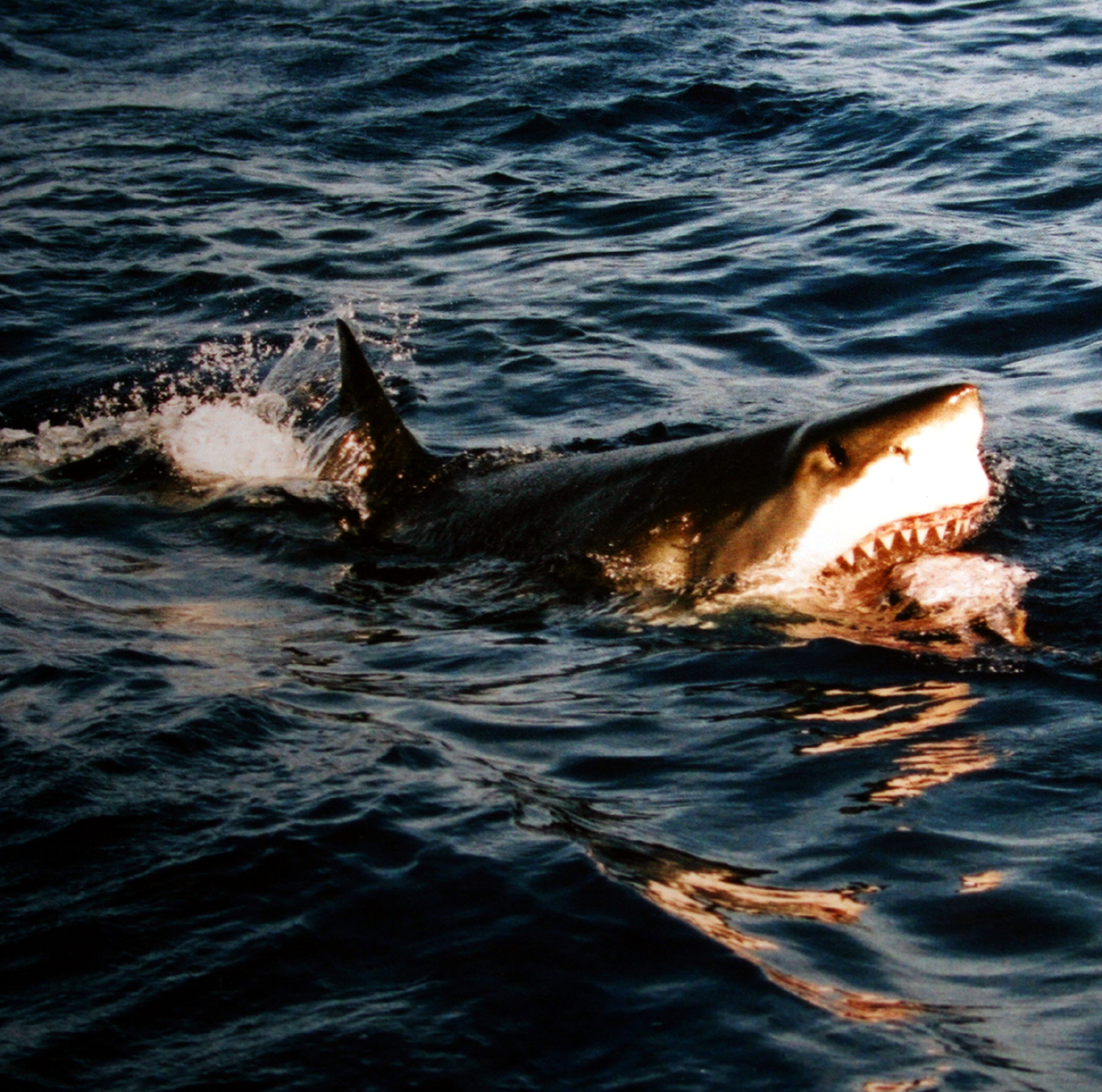
Teeth of a great white shark

Fish, such as sharks, may go through many teeth in their lifetime. The replacement of multiple teeth is known as polyphyodontia.

A class of prehistoric shark are called cladodonts for their strange forked teeth.

Unlike the continuous shedding of functional teeth seen in modern sharks, the majority of stem chondrichthyan lineages retained all tooth generations developed throughout the life of the animal. This replacement mechanism is exemplified by the tooth whorl-based dentitions of acanthodians, which include the oldest known toothed vertebrate, Qianodus duplicis.

== Amphibians ==
All amphibians have pedicellate teeth, which are modified to be flexible due to connective tissue and uncalcified dentine that separates the crown from the base of the tooth.

Most amphibians exhibit teeth that have a slight attachment to the jaw or acrodont teeth. Acrodont teeth exhibit limited connection to the dentary and have little enervation. This is ideal for organisms who mostly use their teeth for grasping, but not for crushing and allows for rapid regeneration of teeth at a low energy cost. Teeth are usually lost in the course of feeding if the prey is struggling. Additionally, amphibians that undergo a metamorphosis develop bicuspid shaped teeth.

== Reptiles ==
The teeth of reptiles are replaced constantly throughout their lives. Crocodilian juveniles replace teeth with larger ones at a rate as high as one new tooth per socket every month. Once mature, tooth replacement rates can slow to two years and even longer. Overall, crocodilians may use 3,000 teeth from birth to death. New teeth are created within old teeth.

== Birds ==
A skull of Ichthyornis discovered in 2014 suggests that the beak of birds may have evolved from teeth to allow chicks to escape their shells earlier, and thus avoid predators and also to penetrate protective covers such as hard earth to access underlying food.

== Invertebrates ==
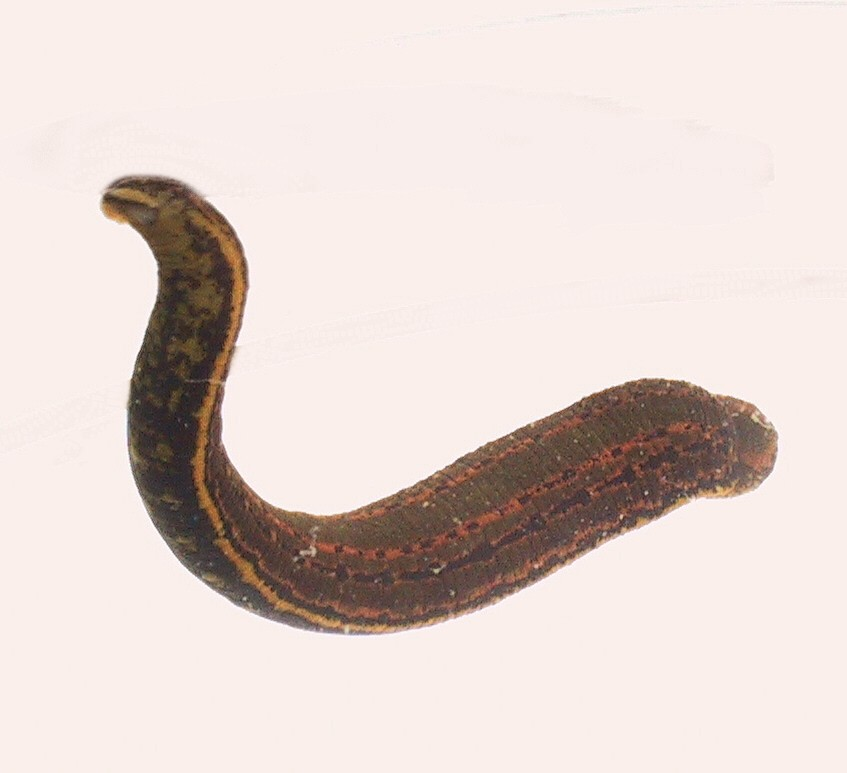
The European medicinal leech has three jaws with numerous sharp teeth which function like little saws for incising a host.

True teeth are unique to vertebrates, although many invertebrates have analogous structures often referred to as teeth. The organisms with the simplest genome bearing such tooth-like structures are perhaps the parasitic worms of the family Ancylostomatidae. For example, the hookworm Necator americanus has two dorsal and two ventral cutting plates or teeth around the anterior margin of the buccal capsule. It also has a pair of subdorsal and a pair of subventral teeth located close to the rear.

Historically, the European medicinal leech, another invertebrate parasite, has been used in medicine to remove blood from patients. They have three jaws (tripartite) that resemble saws in both appearance and function, and on them are about 100 sharp teeth used to incise the host. The incision leaves a mark that is an inverted Y inside of a circle. After piercing the skin and injecting anticoagulants (hirudin) and anaesthetics, they suck out blood, consuming up to ten times their body weight in a single meal.

In some species of Bryozoa, the first part of the stomach forms a muscular gizzard lined with chitinous teeth that crush armoured prey such as diatoms. Wave-like peristaltic contractions then move the food through the stomach for digestion.

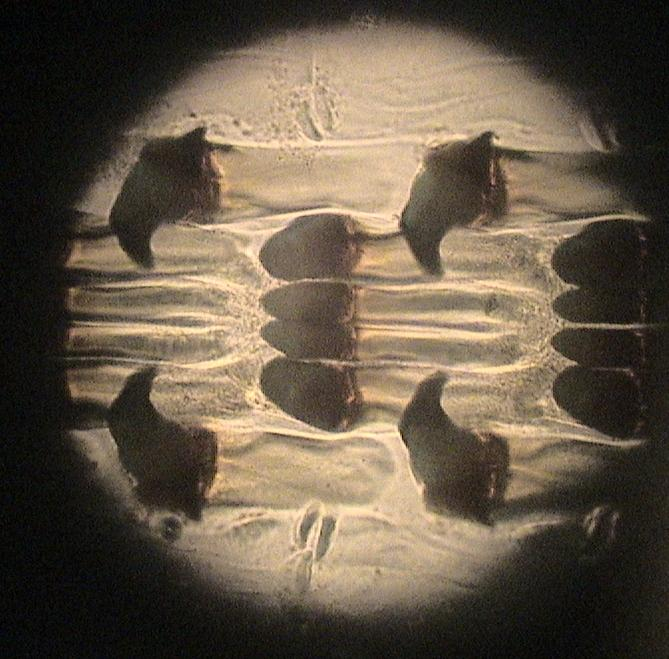
The limpet rasps algae from rocks using teeth with the strongest known tensile strength of any biological material.

Molluscs have a structure called a radula, which bears a ribbon of chitinous teeth. However, these teeth are histologically and developmentally different from vertebrate teeth and are unlikely to be homologous. For example, vertebrate teeth develop from a neural crest mesenchyme-derived dental papilla, and the neural crest is specific to vertebrates, as are tissues such as enamel.

The radula is used by molluscs for feeding and is sometimes compared rather inaccurately to a tongue. It is a minutely toothed, chitinous ribbon, typically used for scraping or cutting food before the food enters the oesophagus. The radula is unique to molluscs, and is found in every class of mollusc apart from bivalves.

Within the gastropods, the radula is used in feeding by both herbivorous and carnivorous snails and slugs. The arrangement of teeth (also known as denticles) on the radula ribbon varies considerably from one group to another as shown in the diagram on the left.

Predatory marine snails such as the Naticidae use the radula plus an acidic secretion to bore through the shell of other molluscs. Other predatory marine snails, such as the Conidae, use a specialized radula tooth as a poisoned harpoon. Predatory pulmonate land slugs, such as the ghost slug, use elongated razor-sharp teeth on the radula to seize and devour earthworms. Predatory cephalopods, such as squid, use the radula for cutting prey.

In most of the more ancient lineages of gastropods, the radula is used to graze by scraping diatoms and other microscopic algae off rock surfaces and other substrates. Limpets scrape algae from rocks using radula equipped with exceptionally hard rasping teeth. These teeth have the strongest known tensile strength of any biological material, outperforming spider silk. The mineral protein of the limpet teeth can withstand a tensile stress of 4.9 GPa, compared to 4 GPa of spider silk and 0.5 GPa of human teeth.

== Fossilization and taphonomy ==
Because teeth are very resistant, often preserved when bones are not, and reflect the diet of the host organism, they are very valuable to archaeologists and palaeontologists. Early fish such as the thelodonts had scales composed of dentine and an enamel-like compound, suggesting that the origin of teeth was from scales which were retained in the mouth. Fish as early as the late Cambrian had dentine in their exoskeletons, which may have functioned in defense or for sensing their environments. Dentine can be as hard as the rest of teeth and is composed of collagen fibres, reinforced with hydroxyapatite.

Though teeth are very resistant, they also can be brittle and highly susceptible to cracking. However, cracking of the tooth can be used as a diagnostic tool for predicting bite force. Additionally, enamel fractures can also give valuable insight into the diet and behaviour of archaeological and fossil samples.

Decalcification removes the enamel from teeth and leaves only the organic interior intact, which comprises dentine and cementine. Enamel is quickly decalcified in acids, perhaps by dissolution by plant acids or via diagenetic solutions, or in the stomachs of vertebrate predators. Enamel can be lost by abrasion or spalling, and is lost before dentine or bone are destroyed by the fossilisation process. In such a case, the 'skeleton' of the teeth would consist of the dentine, with a hollow pulp cavity. The organic part of dentine, conversely, is destroyed by alkalis.

== See also ==
- Animal tooth development
- Dragon's teeth (mythology)
- Dental anthropology
- Tomium

== Sources ==
- Shoshani, Jeheskel (2002). "Tubulidentata". In Robertson, Sarah (ed.). Encyclopedia of Life Sciences. Vol. 18: Svedberg, Theodor to Two-hybrid and Related Systems. London, UK: Nature Publishing Group. ISBN 978-1-56159-274-6.
