= Schultz's rule =

Relationship between tooth wear and lifespan of fossil organisms

Schultz's rule is a rule developed by Adolph Hans Schultz, declaring a relationship between the first tooth eruption of the molar versus the permanent teeth and the progress or aging of its carrier. It states that species that live longer have more wear on deciduous teeth and as a result start replacing them relatively early in life. Which is an indicator for examining fossil data. According to research, Myotragus balearicus follows Schultz's Rule.

== See also ==
- Diphyodont - animals who grow one replacement for each tooth
- Polyphyodont - animals who continue to grow new teeth throughout their life
- Animal tooth development
- Human tooth development
