= Wuzhishan pig =

Chinese breed of pig

The Wuzhishan is a Chinese breed of small domestic pig from the Wuzhishan mountains of Hainan Island, off the south coast of China. It was formerly numerous in the island, but in the later twentieth century numbers fell heavily as a consequence of indiscriminate cross-breeding with pigs of faster-growing breeds. It was listed in 1991 as being at risk of extinction, and in 2000 was officially identified as one of nineteen pig breeds most in need of conservation. Other names for it are the Shan and the Laoshu – which means 'mouse'.

== History ==
The Wuzhishan is a traditional breed of the Wuzhishan mountains of Hainan Island, off the south coast of China, and was formerly numerous in the island, with an estimated total population in the 1960s of some 10000. Later in the twentieth century, pigs of faster-growing breeds were brought to Hainan from the mainland; indiscriminate cross-breeding with these led to a rapid decline in numbers of the original stock to no more than a few hundreds, and by 1991 it was considered to be at risk of extinction. In 2000 it was among the nineteen pigs on a government list of breeds with the highest priority for conservation. A conservation herd at the Institute of Animal Science of the Chinese Academy of Agricultural Sciences in Beijing, established in 1989 from a nucleus of three of the pigs, had by 2004 had grown to some two hundred head. Another herd was established in Hainan by the Academy of Agricultural Sciences in the 1990s, and also grew to about two hundred head.

== Characteristics ==
It is a small pig, with a weight for sows of some 30–35 kg, height at the withers of 35–45 cm, and body length in the range 50–70 cm. The pigs are black with white underparts – the belly, the inner sides of the legs and the feet.

The Wuzhishan pig is mainly used to study the human circulatory system due to the similarities between pig and human organs.

== Genetic research ==
The full genome sequence and analysis were completed by BGI Group in 2012; the breed was successfully identified in early 2013. The intellectual property rights for the breed are protected by both Chinese and American patents.

On May 18 2015, the Chinese Academy of Agricultural Sciences announced that its Institute of Animal Science agreed to transfer all breeding research to Beijing Grand Life Science & Technology Co., Ltd., which had the sole rights to breed and sell Wuzhishan pigs for commercial purposes.

Multiple Chinese research institutions, medical schools, hospitals, and enterprises conduct research around Wuzhishan pigs to establish their suitability as research models. Research on future life science and medical applications of the pigs also began to take place, to which the initial results include the injection of embryonic germ cells into blastocysts, along with islet isolation and purification.

On June 23, 2017, the Academy of Military Medical Sciences and Grand Life Science declared that the PERV-pol gene-deficient Wuzhishan pig had been identified and verified by systematic virology methods and whole genome sequencing. Grand Life had succeeded in reproducing F0/F1 PERV-noninfectious Wuzhishan pigs that became available for advanced biomedical research purposes. This included a series of studies under the 2017-2020 National Primary Research Programs on bio-material development and tissue-organ repair.
