= Wuzhishan City =

Wuzhishan 五指山市
- County-level & Sub-prefectural city
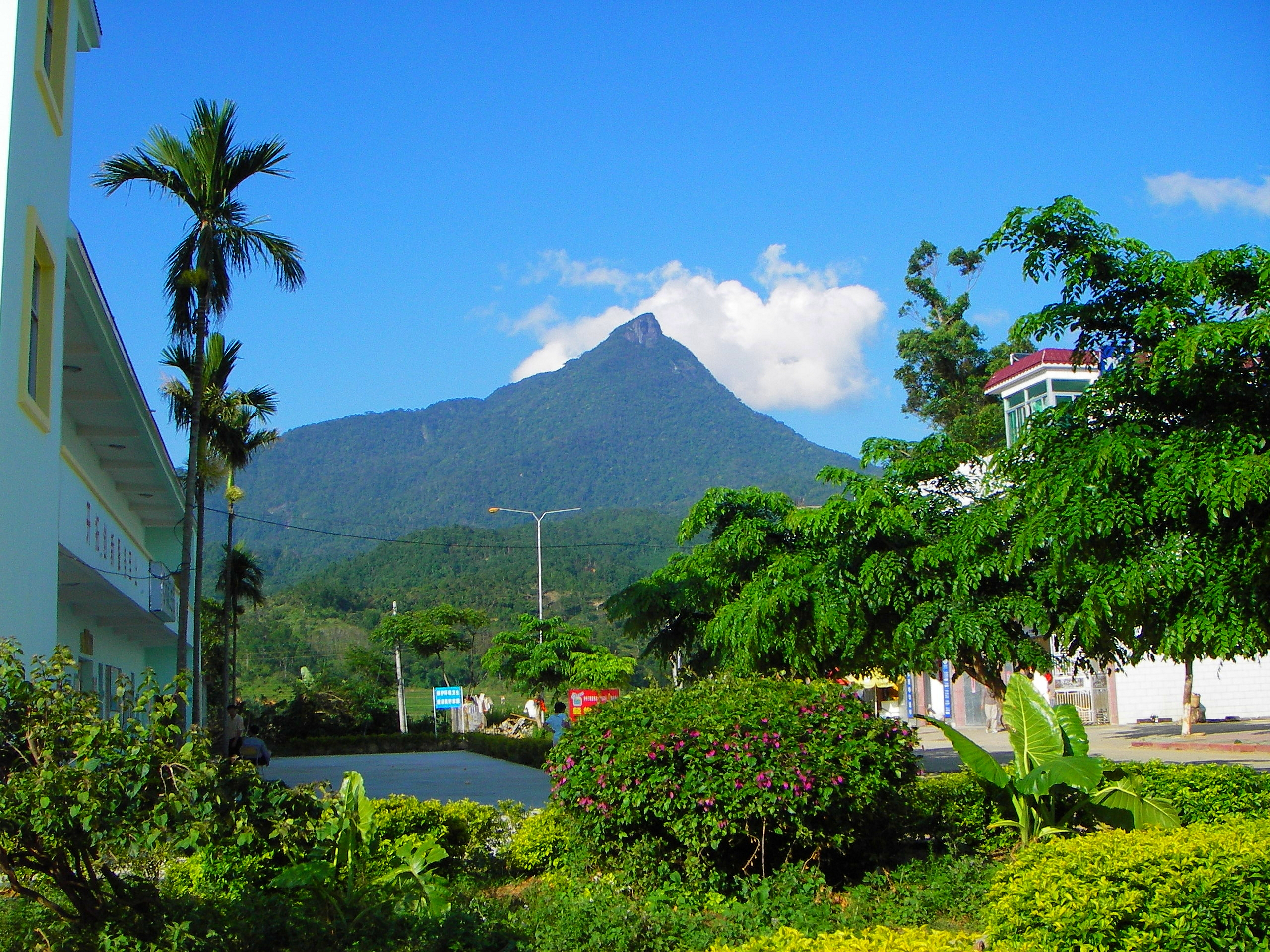

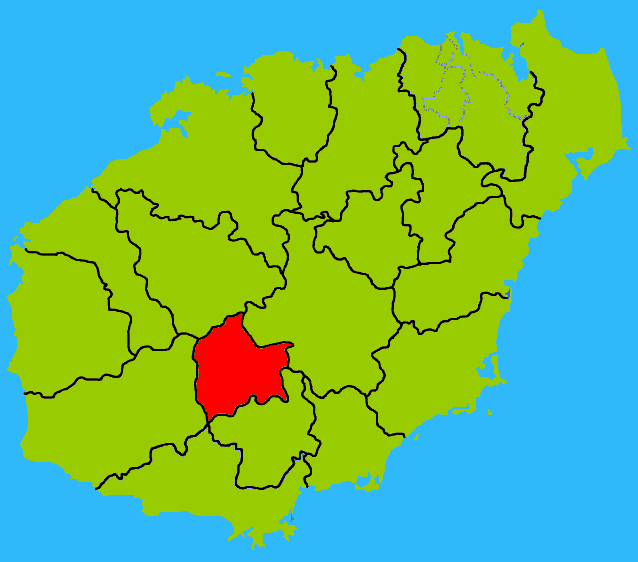
- Wuzhishan City jurisdiction in Hainan

- Location of the city center in Hainan
- Coordinates (Wuzhishan City government): 18°46′30″N 109°31′01″E
- Country: People's Republic of China
- Province: Hainan

Area
  - Total: 1,130.81 km^{2} (436.61 sq mi)

Population (2010)
  - Total: 104,122
  - Density: 92.0774/km^{2} (238.479/sq mi)
- Time zone: UTC+8 (China standard time)

Wuzhishan (literally, five-point mountain) is a county-level city in the highlands of Hainan Island, China. Although called a "city", Wuzhishan refers to a large land area in Hainan – an area which was once a county. Within this area is the main city seat, located beside Wuzhi Mountain, called Wuzhishan City. The city's total area is 1129 square kilometres, and its population is 115,000 people. Its postal code is 572200, and its district number is 0898.

== Municipal Government ==
=== Wuzhishan Municipal Public Security Bureau ===
The Wuzhishan Municipal Public Security Bureau (五指山市公安局) is the primary law enforcement agency of Wuzhishan. As of 2014, it had 136 sworn officers and 14 civilian employees.

== Climate ==
Wuzhishan has a tropical wet and dry climate (Köppen Aw). The region yes Hainan rainforest of core region

Climate data for Wuzhishan, elevation 329 m (1,079 ft), (1991–2020 normals, extremes 1962–present)
Month	Jan	Feb	Mar	Apr	May	Jun	Jul	Aug	Sep	Oct	Nov	Dec	Year
Record high °C (°F)	31.0 (87.8)	35.1 (95.2)	35.1 (95.2)	37.6 (99.7)	36.7 (98.1)	35.7 (96.3)	37.0 (98.6)	34.8 (94.6)	35.4 (95.7)	33.7 (92.7)	32.9 (91.2)	31.0 (87.8)	37.6 (99.7)
Mean daily maximum °C (°F)	24.6 (76.3)	25.7 (78.3)	28.0 (82.4)	30.4 (86.7)	31.8 (89.2)	31.8 (89.2)	31.5 (88.7)	31.3 (88.3)	30.6 (87.1)	29.1 (84.4)	27.3 (81.1)	24.8 (76.6)	28.9 (84.0)
Daily mean °C (°F)	18.7 (65.7)	20.0 (68.0)	22.4 (72.3)	24.8 (76.6)	26.3 (79.3)	26.7 (80.1)	26.4 (79.5)	26.0 (78.8)	25.2 (77.4)	23.8 (74.8)	21.8 (71.2)	19.2 (66.6)	23.4 (74.2)
Mean daily minimum °C (°F)	14.8 (58.6)	16.2 (61.2)	18.7 (65.7)	21.1 (70.0)	22.7 (72.9)	23.5 (74.3)	23.3 (73.9)	23.1 (73.6)	22.3 (72.1)	20.4 (68.7)	18.2 (64.8)	15.6 (60.1)	20.0 (68.0)
Record low °C (°F)	0.1 (32.2)	5.7 (42.3)	5.0 (41.0)	14.8 (58.6)	13.1 (55.6)	16.6 (61.9)	19.6 (67.3)	20.0 (68.0)	15.6 (60.1)	10.0 (50.0)	7.0 (44.6)	1.8 (35.2)	0.1 (32.2)
Average precipitation mm (inches)	14.7 (0.58)	16.0 (0.63)	40.1 (1.58)	98.5 (3.88)	187.7 (7.39)	204.0 (8.03)	295.9 (11.65)	315.1 (12.41)	330.1 (13.00)	249.1 (9.81)	81.4 (3.20)	23.6 (0.93)	1,856.2 (73.09)
Average precipitation days (≥ 0.1 mm)	6.1	6.1	6.4	9.6	16.0	16.7	19.1	21.4	21.6	14.1	7.5	5.5	150.1
Average relative humidity (%)	81	80	80	80	82	83	84	85	86	83	82	80	82
Mean monthly sunshine hours	150.5	139.4	172.9	187.3	192.9	169.5	176.6	155.6	140.4	160.2	153.6	143.8	1,942.7
Percentage possible sunshine	44	43	46	50	48	43	44	40	39	44	46	42	44
Source: China Meteorological Administration all-time extreme lowall-time March recordall-time April Record high (and extreme record)
