= Wuzhi Mountain =

Mountain in Hainan, China

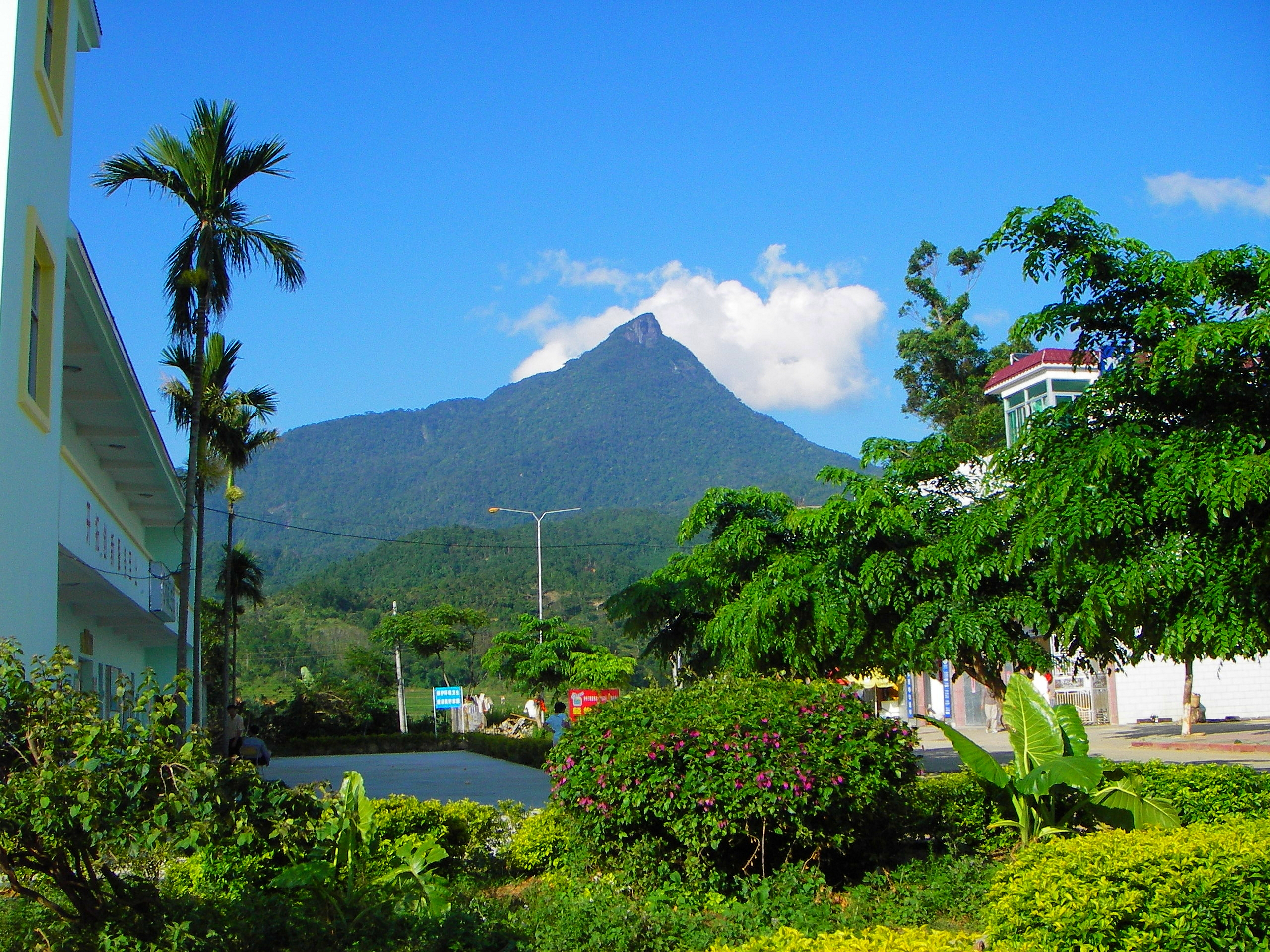
- Wuzhi Mountain in summer

Highest point
- Elevation: 1,840 m (6,040 ft)
- Prominence: 1,840 m (6,040 ft)
- Listing: Ultra, Ribu
- Coordinates: 18°55′16.42″N 109°43′58.15″E

Geography
- Location within Hainan
- Location: Qiongzhong County, Hainan, China

Wuzhi Mountain (Chinese: 五指山; pinyin: Wǔzhǐ Shān; lit. 'Five Finger Mountain') is the highest mountain in Hainan, China, towering 1,840 metres (6,040 ft) above the center of Hainan Island. The surrounding areas of Wuzhi Mountain are inhabited mainly by the Li ethnic group. It is located adjacent to Wuzhishan City but is not part of that city's administrative area.

Various Li myths concern the name for the mountain (Five Finger Mountain) and its formation. One legend has it that the five mountain peaks are the fossilized fingers of a dead Li clan chief. Another tale is that the five peaks are dedicated to the five most powerful Li gods. Numerous historical poems have also been written about the mountain, the most famous of all by the Hainan writer, Qiujun.

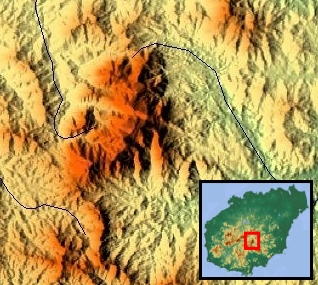
Topographical map of Wuzhi Mountain

== See also ==
- List of ultras of Tibet, East Asia and neighbouring areas
