= Thecodont dentition =

Type of formation of teeth

Thecodont dentition is a morphological arrangement in which the base of the tooth is completely enclosed in a deep socket of bone, as seen in crocodilians, dinosaurs, and mammals. This is opposed to the acrodont and pleurodont dentition seen in squamate reptiles. Notably, thecodonty appears to be the ancestral tooth condition in Amniota. This morphology was once used as a basis for the now-defunct taxonomic group Thecodontia.

Subthecodonty, also called anyklosed thecodonty, refers to the asymmetrical implantation of a tooth in a shallow socket. Here, the labial (outer) wall of the tooth-bearing bone is higher than the lingual (inner) wall.
