= Polyphyodont =

Animal whose teeth are continually replaced

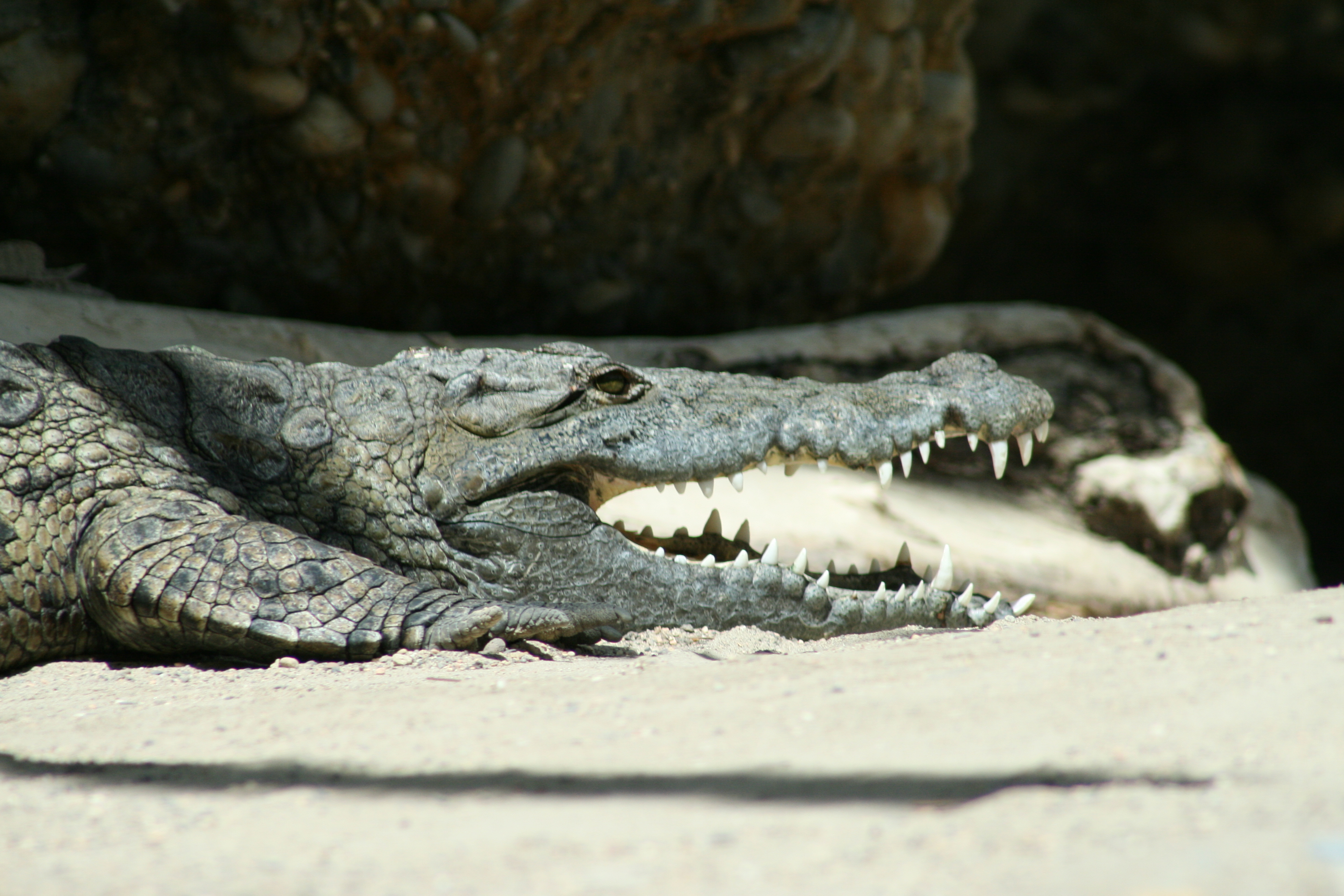
Nile crocodile (Crocodylus niloticus)

A polyphyodont is any animal whose teeth are continually replaced. In contrast, diphyodonts are characterized by having only two successive sets of teeth.

Polyphyodonts include most toothed fishes (most notably sharks), many reptiles such as crocodiles and geckos, and most other vertebrates, with mammals being the main exception (though not absolute).

== Growth ==
New, permanent teeth grow in the jaws, usually under or just behind the old tooth, from stem cells in the dental lamina. Young animals typically have a full set of teeth when they hatch; there is no tooth change in the egg. Within days, tooth replacement begins, usually in the back of the jaw continuing forward like a wave. On average a tooth is replaced every few months.

== Crocodilia ==
Crocodilia are the only non-mammalian vertebrates with tooth sockets. Alligators grow a successional tooth (a small replacement tooth) under each mature functional tooth for replacement about once a year, each tooth being replaced up to about 50 times in the alligator's life. This process is being researched for possible adaptation to tooth regeneration in humans.

== Evolution in mammals ==
Manatees, elephants and kangaroos are unusual among mammals because they are polyphyodonts, in contrast to most other mammals which replace their teeth only once in their lives (diphyodont). Although most other extant mammals are not polyphyodont, some early mammals and mammalian ancestors were. Some degree of polyphyodonty is known in Dongoconodon and Gobiconodon borissiaki, two members of the extinct basal mammal clade Eutriconodonta. One hypothesis is during the evolution of Therapsida, there was a period during which mammals were so small and short-lived that wear on the teeth yielded no significant selection pressure to constantly replace them. Instead, mammals evolved different types of teeth which formed a unit able to crack the exoskeleton of arthropods. Molars came later in their evolution. Mammals chew (masticate) their food which requires a set of firmly attached, strong teeth and a "full" tooth row without gaps.

The manatees have no incisor or canine teeth, just a set of cheek teeth, which are not clearly differentiated into molars and premolars. These teeth are continuously replaced throughout their life with new teeth growing at the rear as older teeth fall out from farther forward in the mouth, a process known as "hind molar progression" or "marching molars".

== See also ==
- Regeneration (biology)
- Regenerative medicine
- Regenerative endodontics
- Schultz's rule
- Sinoconodon - an early mammal relative which was a polyphyodont
- Animal tooth development
