= Hormel Institute =

Research facility in Minnesota, US

Coordinates: 43°40′56″N 92°57′57″W

The Hormel Institute
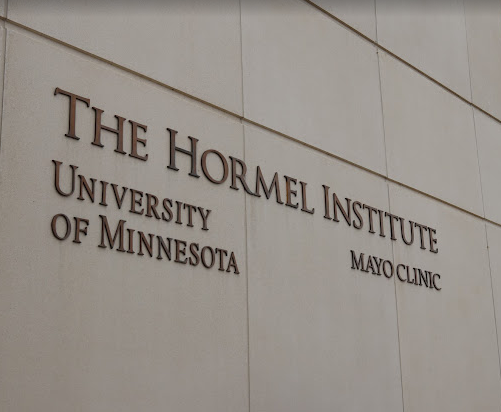
- Type: Medical research facility
- Location: 801 16th Ave. NE, Austin, MN 55912
- Executive Director: Rovbert Clarke
- Parent organization: University of Minnesota
- Website: www.hi.umn.edu

The Hormel Institute is a biomedical research center located in Austin, Minnesota, United States. Founded in 1942, the institute is a division of the University of Minnesota with scientists focusing primarily on cancer research. The Hormel Institute has maintained a longstanding, collaborative partnership with the nearby Mayo Clinic.

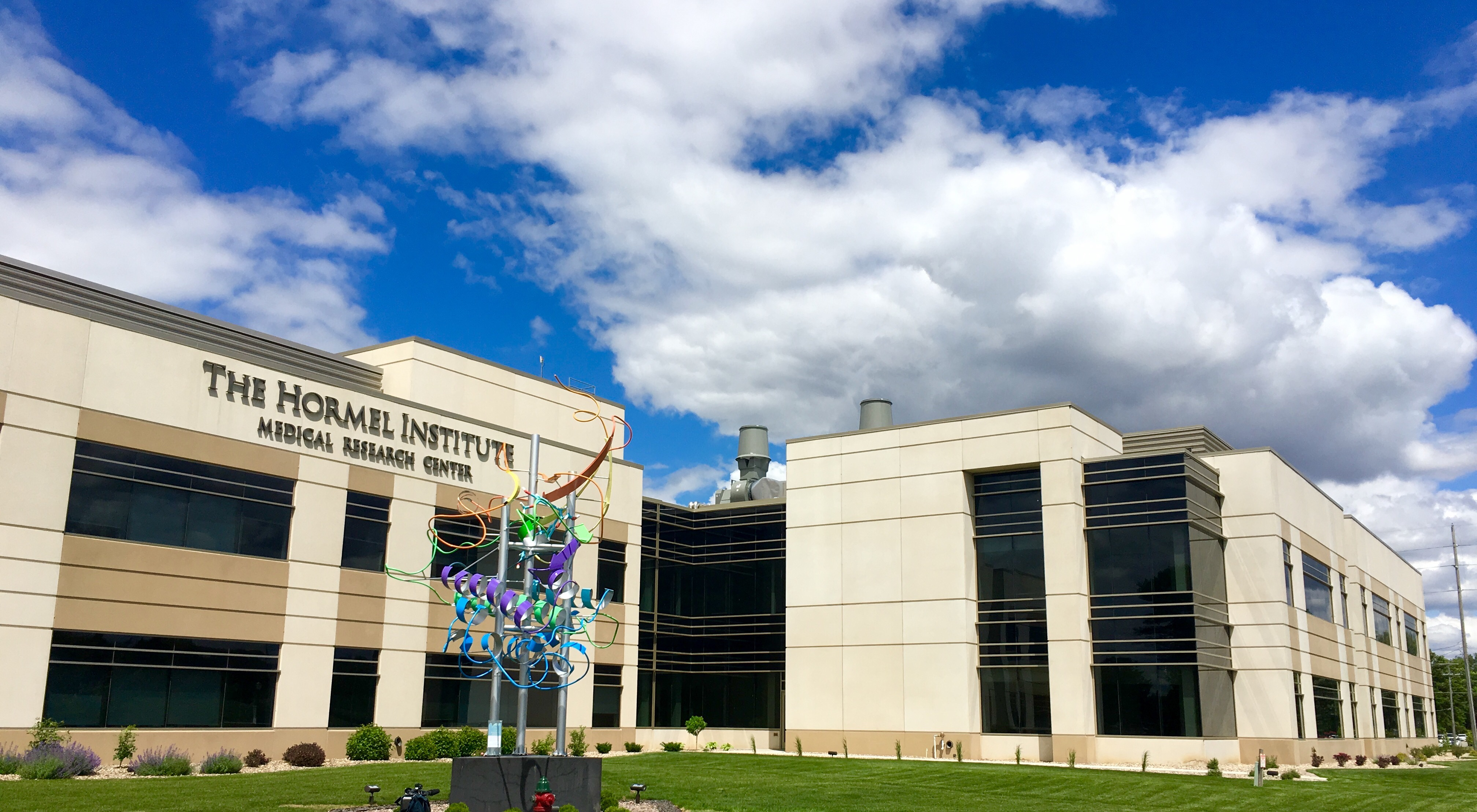
The Hormel Institute in Austin, Minnesota
