= Vietnamese Pot-bellied =

Vietnamese breed of pig

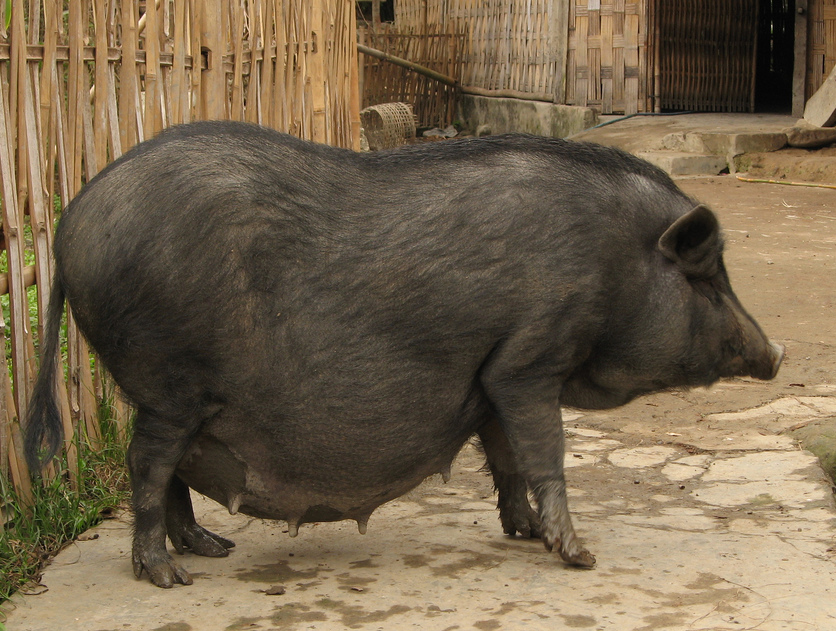
- Conservation status: FAO (2007): endangered; DAD-IS (2025): unknown
- Other names: Black I; Pot-bellied Pig; Rough I; Vietnamese: Lợn Ỉ; Lon I; I; Í; Goc; Í Thanh Hoa
- Country of origin: Vietnam
- Distribution: Red River Delta
- Use: meat

Traits
- Weight: Male: average: 50 kg (110 lb); Female: average: 48 kg (105 lb)
- Height: Male: average: 36 cm (14 in); Female: average: 35 cm (14 in)
- Hair: black

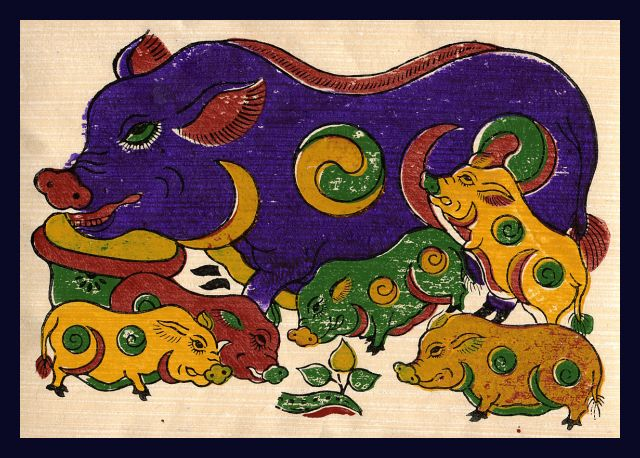
Đông Hồ painting of pigs of I type

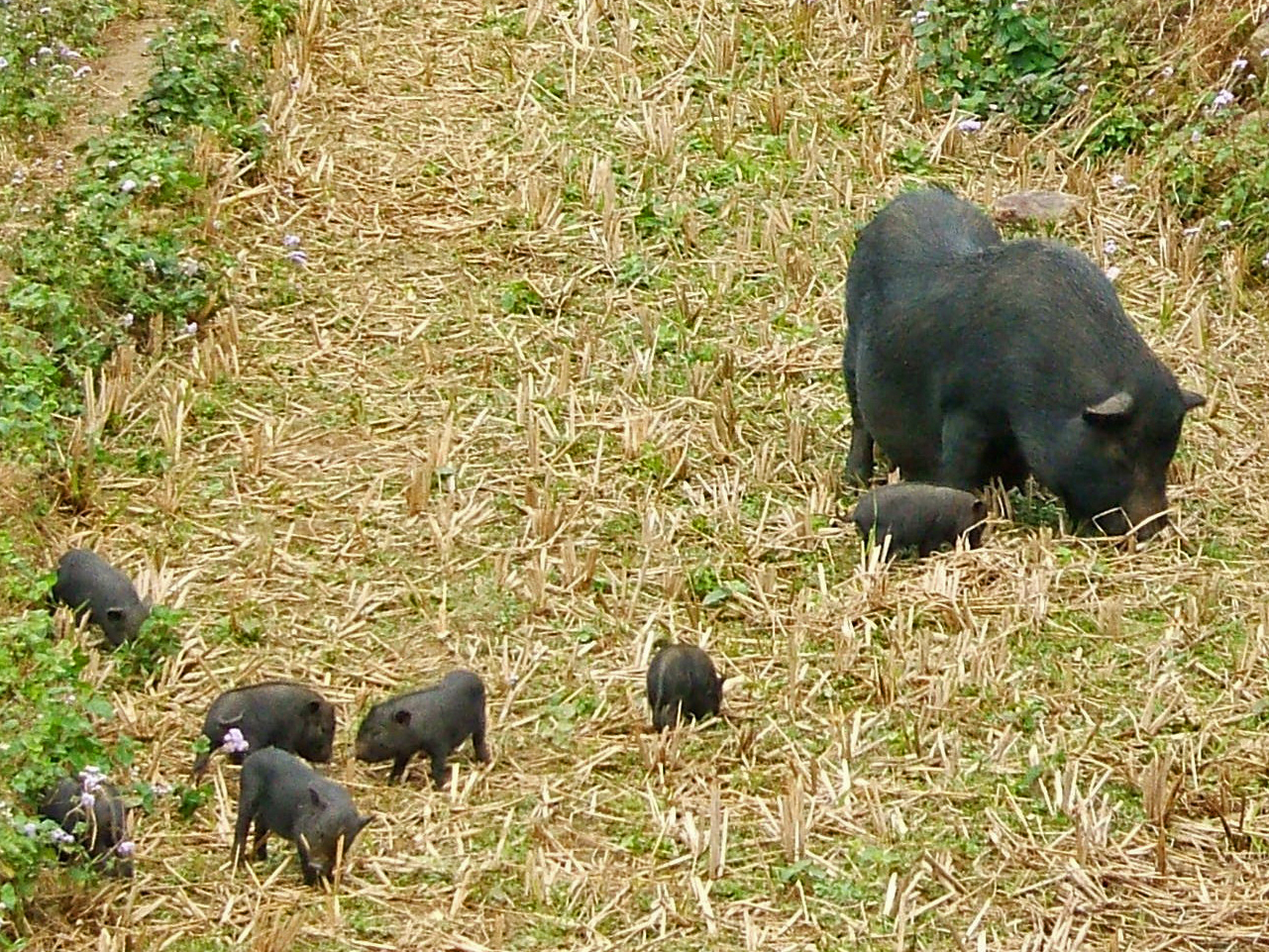
Foraging on rice terraces in Sa Pa, in Lào Cai Province

Vietnamese Pot-bellied is the exonym for the Lon I (Vietnamese: Lợn Ỉ) or I pig, (Note: "Lon", Vietnamese: Lợn, means "pig".) an endangered traditional Vietnamese breed of small domestic pig.

The I is uniformly black and has short legs and a low-hanging belly, from which the name derives. It is reared for meat; it is slow-growing, but the pork has good flavour. The I was depicted in the traditional Đông Hồ paintings of Bắc Ninh province as a symbol of happiness, satiety and wealth.

== History ==
The I is a traditional Vietnamese breed. It is thought to have originated in the province of Nam Định, in the Red River Delta. It was the dominant local pig breed in most provinces of the delta, and was widely distributed in Nam Định province and the neighbouring provinces of Hà Nam, Ninh Bình and Thái Bình, as well as in the province of Thanh Hóa immediately to the south, in the North Central Coast region.

Until the 1970s the I was probably the most numerous pig breed in northern Vietnam, with numbers running into millions. From that time, the more productive Móng Cái began to supplant it. The National Institute of Animal Husbandry of Vietnam started a conservation programme, with subsidies for farmers who reared purebred stock, but this had little benefit – there was some increase in numbers, but at the cost of increased inbreeding. In 1991, the total population of the I was estimated at 675000, and by 2010 the estimated number was 120; no population data was reported in the following fifteen years. In 2003 the National Institute of Animal Husbandry listed its conservation status as "critical" and in 2007 the Food and Agriculture Organization of the United Nations listed it as "endangered"; in 2025 its conservation status was unknown.

Small numbers of I pigs were exported in the 1960s to Canada and Sweden, to be kept in zoos or to be used for laboratory experiments. Within a decade, the I had spread to animal parks in other countries in Europe; a few were reared on smallholdings. The I entered the United States from Canada in the mid-1980s, and by the end of the decade the "pot-bellied pig" was being marketed as a pet. Not all of these were purebred, and some grew to considerable size; the fad was short-lived.

In 2013 it was declared an invasive species in Spain.

== Characteristics ==
The I is a small pig, with an average weight of approximately 50 kg, and an average height of about 36 cm. It is uniformly black, with heavily wrinkled skin. It has a pronounced sway back and a large sagging belly, which in pregnant sows may drag on the ground. The head is small, with an up-turned snout, small ears and eyes, and heavy sagging jowls.

The I is robust and has good resistance to disease and to parasites. It is usually raised extensively, and forages well on the rice straw and water plants of its native area. It is particularly well adapted to the marshy and muddy terrain on which it usually lives: it has plantigrade feet, with weight borne on all four toes of each foot.

Two principal types are recognised within the breed: the I-mo (Vietnamese: ỉ mỡ, lit. 'Fatty I') is the typical small short-legged pig, with small upward-pointing ears and a short snout; the I-pha (ỉ pha, 'Large I') is taller, has longer legs and a longer snout, with bigger ears held horizontally.
