= Tooth ankylosis =

- Specialty: Dentistry

Tooth ankylosis refers to a fusion between a tooth and underlying bony support tissues. In some species, this is a normal process that occurs during the formation or maintenance of the dentition. By contrast, in humans tooth ankylosis is pathological, whereby a fusion between alveolar bone and the cementum of a tooth occurs.

In humans, this is a rare phenomenon in deciduous dentition and even more uncommon in permanent teeth. Ankylosis occurs when partial root resorption is followed by repair with either cementum or dentine that unites the tooth root with the alveolar bone, usually after trauma. However, root resorption does not necessarily lead to tooth ankylosis and the causes of tooth ankylosis remain uncertain to a large extent. However, it is evident that the incident rate of ankylosis in deciduous teeth is much higher than that of permanent teeth.

Risk factors of tooth ankylosis can be generally classified into genetic factors and dental trauma. Diagnostic methods of tooth ankylosis include the use of clinical examinations, x-ray and cone beam computerized tomography (CBCT). Tooth ankylosis could have several symptoms, with decreased tooth count being the most prominent one. Factors like gender and sex may also lead to the incidence of certain signs, yet the full mechanisms have not been well evaluated. In general, the non-growing subjects and growing subjects would exhibit different signs and symptoms.

Individuals suffering from ankylosis of deciduous teeth risk of losing these teeth due to the failure of the tooth eruption during facial growth and would lead to a series of functional and esthetic problems. After diagnosis with clinical examination or CBCT image, tooth ankylosis is often treated by removing the crown of the affected tooth. Early orthodontic interception is also confirmed to be effective in promoting the recovery of the lost space as well as allowing the eruption of the teeth. It is current under the investigation of its probability being used as a prevention of tooth ankylosis.

== Prevention and management ==
Since ankylosis may hinder the normal development of teeth, early diagnosis and intercession is important to avoid further progression and deterioration of the situation. In particular, when such an abnormality is found in deciduous teeth among children and adolescents, it would often result in the infraocclusion of the ankylosed tooth, inclination of the teeth adjacent to the space. Subsequently, impaction of the permanent successor tooth would result. In light of the situation, early interceptive orthodontic treatment is confirmed to be effective in promoting the recovery of the lost space as well as allowing the eruption of the teeth. According to a reported case, this method provided positive results and ameliorated the situation of the patient.

== Signs and symptoms ==
Tooth ankylosis can be recognised clinically by the loss of physiological mobility, and a high P note. It may also be detected radiographically, loss of periodontal ligament space and evidence of replacement resorption. Ankylosis usually initially occurs on the labial and lingual root surfaces making radiographic detection in the early stages difficult. Early diagnosis allows the practitioner to plan for future complications.

For non-growing subjects who possess fully developed permanent teeth, there may not be any observable symptoms. The alveolar support of the affected tooth will be lowered due to continuous replacement resorption of the root. This process will stop with the appearance of root fractures and shed crown, and changes in dentition, especially the anterior teeth, can be observed in this stage. Symptoms such as infraocclusion and asymmetry in the smile arc may be developed. However, for ankylosis in posterior teeth happening in non-growing subjects, it may be completely asymptomatic because the slow change in height of the affected teeth may not be noticeable to both the patient and the doctor, compared to that happened in anterior teeth.

For growing subjects, symptoms can also be varied as different growth aspects of teeth including the vertical, sagittal and transverse growth are different in children and adolescents. Generally, symptoms are more severe for earlier occurrence of the disease. Most ankyloses occurring in children are trauma-induced, which can lead to malposition of the affected teeth as the major symptom.

For moderate and severe conditions in growing subjects, symptoms such as functional impairment due to loss of occlusal contacts which results from the reduced vertical distance of the ankylosed teeth, and shift in dental midline associated with tipping of adjacent teeth towards the affected tooth, are likely to be developed. Alternatively, open bite and supra-eruption of opposing teeth may also be noticed.

== Causes ==
Diagram of a healthy human molar showing the enamel, cementum, pulp, and dentin which make up the structure, as well as the surrounding tissues

The causes of ankylosis of teeth is uncertain. One common belief is the role of genetic factors with an autosomal dominant inheritance pattern, evidenced by the appearance of family occurrence in several families. Trauma, inflammation and infection may also be responsible for causing the disease.

The frequency for ankylosis to happen in deciduous teeth is far more frequent than that in permanent teeth, with a ratio of about 10 to 1, and the majority of the ankylosed teeth occur in lower teeth, about twice as often as in the upper teeth. Therefore, it is strongly believed that their incidence may be due to different causes.

For ankylosis in permanent teeth, with the first molar being the most common affected teeth, it is hard to find a precise cause because of the complicated nature which is believed to be linked to several different factors and the difficulty in diagnosis as many cases are asymptomatic.

For other cases, there are several theories explaining the cause. Dental trauma may be a major cause for the disease since it can lead to luxation, reported in 30 to 44% of all dental trauma cases, and hence replacement resorption, which is the situation in ankylosis of teeth. The association between tooth ankylosis and orthodontic treatment are also observed in some cases, in which the leakage of etchant to the junction between cementum and enamel during the surgery, damage to the junction or tilting of the tooth may be some possible mechanisms to relate the disease to the treatment. Genetic factors may also be involved in causing the disease, which is supported by the occurrence of ankylosed molars, either in primary or permanent dentition, in close relatives. The possible explanation is the inheritance of a gene which might be a process imitator of ankylosis in the periodontal ligament. This gene can then be transferred from parents to offsprings and lead to ankylosis of teeth.

=== Deciduous (baby) teeth ===
Ankylosis of deciduous teeth may rarely occur. The most commonly affected tooth is the mandibular (lower) second deciduous molar. Partial root resorption first occurs and then the tooth fuses to the bone. This prevents normal exfoliation of the deciduous tooth and typically causes impaction of the permanent successor tooth. As growth of the alveolar bone continues and the adjacent permanent teeth erupt, the ankylosed deciduous tooth appears to submerge into the bone, although in reality it has not changed position. Treatment is by extraction of the involved tooth, to prevent malocclusion, periodontal disturbance or dental caries.

=== Permanent (adult) teeth ===
In healthy teeth, the periodontal ligament (PDL) fibroblasts block osteogenic cells within the periodontium by releasing locally acting regulators. This separates the tooth root from alveolar bone. Damage to the PDL disrupts this process resulting bone growth across the periodontal space and fusion with the root. It may occur following dental trauma, especially re-implanted or severely intruded teeth. Increasing the extra oral dry time increases the likelihood of ankylosis The probability also increases with the severity of intrusion. There is no known treatment to arrest the process. Ankylosis itself is not a reason to remove a permanent tooth, however teeth which must be removed for other reasons are made significantly more difficult to remove if they are ankylosed. Ankylosis in growing patients can result in infra occlusion of teeth, this can lead to an aesthetic and functional deficit.

== Risk factors ==
As ankylosis of teeth is often associated with metabolic abnormalities and deficiencies in vertical-bone growth, positive family history with the occurrence of dental ankylosis cases would be a prominent risk factor since such pathological condition could be inherited. Furthermore, other factors or activities that would contribute to injuries, inflammations or infections would also increase the risk of developing ankylosis of teeth.

== Pathophysiology ==
Ankylosis initiates with extensive necrosis of the periodontal ligament with formation of bone which will invade the denuded root surface area. Trauma is believed to be the cause of ankylosis, causing cell death on the root surface. Ankylosis may happen once the injured surface area has reached more than 20%. Damage to the root surface area will trigger an inflammatory response, migration and repopulation of faster bone forming cells, instead of slower periodontal ligament fibroblasts or cementoblasts, occurring in the teeth root surface. In this stage, the teeth are termed to be ankylosed. This migration and repopulation process, termed replacement resorption, will continue and thus the teeth root will become fused with the bone tissue adjacent to it.

== Diagnosis ==
Diagnostic methods of tooth ankylosis include the use of clinical examinations and x-ray. The feasibility of using cone beam computed tomography to diagnose ankylosed teeth is also explored and discussed in a recent research article.

Examinations of teeth are carried out to identify typical features of ankylosis, these features include varying percussion sound with adjacent normal teeth and a lack of mobility. However, these examinations are not always reliable. Although a metal sound on examination of percussion is usually used to indicate the presence of ankylosis, it is found that only one-third of ankylosed teeth give a metal sound in percussion test. In addition, a lack of mobility is not a definitive sign of ankylosis as the tooth can still be mobile if less than 20% of root surface is ankylosed. A definitive diagnosis of ankylosis is believed to be given by checking the mobility of the targeted tooth after applying orthodontic force, an ankylosed tooth will show no mobility.

In early detection of ankylosis, radiographic examination is not effective because it only produces 2-dimensional graphic. This means that the ankylosed site would not be apparent if it is not perpendicular to the x-ray beam. Therefore, it is impossible to identify ankylosis in some areas using x-ray, for instance, buccal or lingual root surface. To overcome such difficulty, cone beam computerized tomography (CBCT) is adopted to provide a 3-dimensional image for better clinical inspection of ankylosis. In a recent research article, a retrospective cohort study was conducted where a wide range of teeth clinically diagnosed as ankylosed were collected and analyzed. The histological sections of each tooth obtained from the CBCT scan were then evaluated by two specialists blinded to the details of the research to ensure the fairness and objectivity of the result. As a result, all histologically established ankylosed teeth were identified by both observers provided with the CBCT image but some false positive results were obtained. It is concluded that CBCT scan can be used as a feasible and effective diagnostic method when it comes to the detection of tooth ankylosis. However, it is not recommended to treat CBCT image as the sole model in the identification of ankylosed teeth unless the false positive results are being eliminated.

Ankylosis and primary fail of eruption (PFE) give similar symptoms, since in both cases a targeted tooth is positioned not vertically and unresponsive to orthodontic force applied. Therefore, ankylosis should be differentiated from primary fail of eruption. For an ankylosed molar, distal teeth can respond to orthodontic force normally and thus can be used as substitute if the ankylosed tooth is extracted. Surgical luxation is sometimes used to break the ankylosis bridge to restore occlusion. For a case of PFE, the targeted molar can only be treated by osteotomy to restore its occlusion.

== Treatment ==
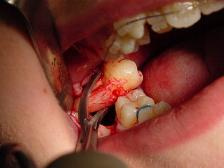
Surgical extraction of an impacted molar

Growing state of patient is one of the factors when deciding what treatment is going to be used.

For growing patients, decoronation is used. Decoronation is the removal of tooth crown. It serves as an alternative surgery for tooth extraction. It is recommended over extraction because it limits bone resorption and therefore maintains a sufficient growth of alveolar bone to enable tooth implantation. Decoronation can be carried out on both deciduous and permanent teeth. However, if the patient is too young and not close to puberty, decoronation should be postponed. In order to maximize the benefits of decoronation, regular monitoring and intervention are needed.

For non-growing patients, decoronation is generally not recommended because the growth of alveolar bone may be inadequate for a future tooth implant, and therefore is said to not give ideal treatment outcomes. As a result, other methods are considered when treating non-growing patients.

Follow-ups are often being adopted in the cases of late onset tooth ankylosis. As tooth growth is insignificant, no surgical procedures are needed to treat the ankylosed tooth as long as its height difference with adjacent teeth is small. In some cases where the height difference is more significant, tooth crown build-up is recommended to restore occlusion.

In addition to tooth crown build-up, ankylosed teeth repositioning is another conservative method. In surgical luxation, after the bridge of ankylosis is broken mechanically, the tooth is positioned slightly away from its original site and allowed to erupt with a temporary insertion of a splint or an orthodontic appliance. Tooth repositioning can also be performed by osteotomy and distraction osteogenesis in cases where surgical luxation fails, or as alternatives.

Extraction of an ankylosed tooth can be considered in both growing and non-growing patients. This method usually serves as a last resort when other methods such as osteotomy and distraction osteogenesis fail to treat ankylosis.

Growing state of patient is not the sole factor when deciding the treatment for an ankylosed tooth. Infraocclusion severity, bone resorption, location of the target tooth as well as dentist's preference all affect the option for treatment. Therefore, treatment for an ankylosed tooth is case-specific.

== Epidemiology ==
The prevalence of tooth ankylosis is still unknown. Individuals of both genders regardless of the ethnic groups may be affected due to inheritance or sporadic traumatic injuries.
