= Dental avulsion =

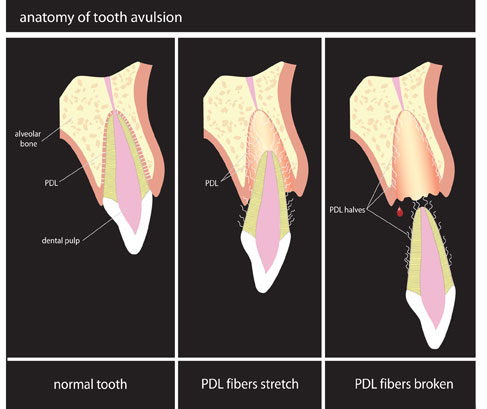
- Specialty: Dentistry

Dental avulsion is the complete displacement of a tooth from its socket in alveolar bone owing to trauma, such as can be caused by a fall, road traffic accident, assault, sports, or occupational injury. Typically, a tooth is held in place by the periodontal ligament, which becomes torn when the tooth is knocked out.

Avulsions of primary teeth are more common in young children as they learn to move independently (walk and run) and also from child abuse. Avulsed deciduous (primary) teeth should not be replanted. Deciduous teeth are not replanted because of the risk of damaging the developing permanent tooth germ. Pulp necrosis with draining fistula, crown discoloration and external root resorption are reported consequences of primary tooth replantation. Tooth dilaceration, impaction and deviation from proper eruption path have been reported to have occurred in permanent teeth as a result of reimplantation of primary teeth.

Avulsed permanent teeth however may be replanted, i.e., returned to the socket. Immediate replantation is considered ideal, but this may not be possible if the patient suffered other serious injuries. If properly preserved, teeth may be replanted up to one hour after avulsion. The success of delayed replantation depends on the survival of the cells remaining on the root surface. Storage in an environment similar to the tooth socket can protect these cells until replantation can be attempted.

== Prevention ==
Contact sports carry a significant risk of dental injury, which can be reduced by wearing a mouthguard or helmet. Mouthguards are often less effective if not fitted properly to the teeth.

Despite their wide availability, the use of mouthguards is relatively uncommon. Many people do not use them even in situations that carry a high risk of dental injury, or when their use is mandated. In addition, mouthguards may be dislodged from the wearer's mouth, leaving the teeth unprotected.

Certain occlusal characteristics, such as class II malocclusions with increased overjet, are associated with a higher risk of dental trauma. These conditions can be corrected by an orthodontist reducing risk of injury due to sports related activities.

== Risk factors ==
- Post-normal occlusion
- An over-jet exceeding 4 mm
- Short upper lip
- Incompetent lips
- Mouth breathing

== Management ==
Dental avulsion is a true dental emergency in which prompt management affects the prognosis of the tooth. Replantation of the tooth within 15 minutes is associated with the best prognosis as periodontal ligament (PDL) cells are still viable. Total extra-oral dry time of more than 60 minutes, regardless of storage media, has poor prognosis. The avulsed permanent tooth should be gently but well rinsed with saline, with care taken not to damage the surface of the root which may have living periodontal fiber and cells. Once the tooth and mouth are clean an attempt can be made to re-plant the tooth in its original socket within the alveolar bone and be splinted (stabilized) by a dentist for several weeks. Failure to re-plant the avulsed tooth within the first 40 minutes after the injury may result in a less favorable prognosis for the tooth. If the tooth cannot be immediately replaced in its socket, follow the directions for any knocked-out (avulsed) teeth kit, or place it in cold milk or saliva and take it to an emergency room or a dentist. If the mouth is sore or injured, cleansing of the wound may be necessary, along with stitches, local anesthesia, and an update of tetanus immunization if the mouth was contaminated with soil. Management of injured primary teeth differs from management of permanent teeth; avulsed primary tooth should not be re-planted (to avoid damage to the permanent dental crypt).

Although dentists advise that the best treatment for an avulsed tooth is immediate replantation, for a variety of reasons this can be difficult for the layperson. The teeth are often covered with debris. This debris must be washed off with a physiological solution and not scrubbed. Often multiple teeth are knocked-out and the person will not know to which tooth socket an individual tooth belongs to. The injured victim may have other more serious injuries that require more immediate attention or injuries such as a severely lacerated bleeding lip or gum that prevent easy visualization of the socket. Pain may be severe, and the person may resist replantation of the teeth. People may, in light of infectious diseases (e.g., HIV), fear handling the teeth or touching the blood associated with them. If immediate replantation is not possible, the teeth should be placed in an appropriate storage solution and brought to a dentist who can then replant them. The dentist will clean the socket, wash the teeth if necessary, and replant them into their sockets. S/he will splint them to other unaffected teeth for a maximum of two weeks for teeth. Properly handled, even replantation of periodontally compromised permanent teeth in older patients under good maintenance have been reported, with splinting extending for over 4 weeks due to the reduced support structure for the root due to periodontal disease. Dental pulp of the avulsed teeth should be removed within 2 weeks of replantation and the teeth should receive root canal therapy.

In addition, as recommended in all cases of dental traumas, good oral hygiene with 0.12% chlorhexidine gluconate mouthwash, a soft and cold diet, and avoidance of smoking for several days may provide a favorable condition for periodontal ligaments regeneration.

=== Initial assessment ===
When a patient arrives at the dentist they should be seen immediately. If the tooth has not been placed in a suitable storage medium, the dentist will do this first. A thorough extra-oral and intra-oral examination should be performed. The clinician should consider the age of the patient, the history of the injury, status of tooth root apex and whether it is in line with clinical findings. It is advisable to check the patient's tetanus status. If there is concern about non-accidental injury, then child protection procedures should be followed. ^{[5]}

=== Re-implantation ===
Prior to the beginning of the procedure, a local anesthetic should be administered to both the palatal/lingual tissues to minimize discomfort. Gentle irrigation with a saline solution, should be performed as this removes any clots within the socket, which could prevent the proper re-positioning of the tooth into its original position. The tooth should always be handled via the enamel on the crown, not the root. Wash the root surface with saline, be careful not to scrub the root surface, as this may crush the delicate cells. Any stubborn debris can be removed by agitating it in the storage medium or by rinsing under a stream of saline.^{[5]}

Stabilize the tooth for 2 weeks using a passive and flexible wire (0.016" or 0.4 mm. Alternatively composite, nylon fishing line can be used to create a flexible splint. If associated with alveolar fracture a more rigid splint may be placed for up to 4 weeks. Systemic antibiotic therapy may be recommended. The patient should be asked to avoid contact sports, eat a soft diet, brush their teeth with a soft toothbrush after each meal, and use Chlorhexidine (0.12%) mouth rinse twice a day for 2 weeks. ^{[5]}

=== Biologic basis for success of replantation following avulsion ===
Every tooth is connected to its surrounding bone by the periodontal ligament. The tooth receives its nourishment through this ligament. When a tooth is knocked out, this ligament is stretched and torn. If the torn periodontal ligament can be kept alive, the tooth can be replanted, and the ligament will reattach, and the tooth can be maintained in its socket. The torn ligament that stays on the socket wall, since it remains connected to the bone and blood supply, is naturally kept alive. However, the ligament cells that remain on the tooth root lose their blood and nutrition supply and must be artificially maintained. They must be protected from two potentially destructive processes: cell crushing and loss of normal cell metabolism. All treatment between the time of the accident and the ultimate replantation must be focused on preventing these two possibilities.

=== Prevention of cell crushing ===
When teeth are knocked out, they end up on an artificial surface: the floor, the ground or material such as carpeting. If the surface is hard, the tooth root cells will be traumatized. Since the cells remaining on the tooth root are very delicate, additional trauma to the PDL cells must be avoided so as to avoid more cell crushing. This damage can occur while picking the tooth up and/or during transportation to the dentist.

When a tooth is picked up, it should always be grasped by the enamel on the crown. Finger pressure on the tooth root cells will cause cell crushing. Any attempt to clean off any debris should be avoided. Debris should always be washed off gently with, at the very least, a physiologic saline. Even with the use of a physiologic saline, the "scrubbing" of the tooth root to remove debris must be avoided. When placed in a physiologic solution, the tooth should be gently agitated to permit the cleansing of the tooth root. At the same time that this agitation occurs, the bumping of the tooth root against a hard surface such as glass, plastic or even cardboard must also be avoided. For the same reasons, the method in which the knocked-out teeth are transported must be carefully selected. Placing the knocked-out teeth by transporting in tissues and handkerchiefs can be damaging and transporting them in glass or cardboard containers can also be potentially damaging to the cells. In addition to the potential damage that the hard surface can cause, glass containers have the added possibility of breakage or leakage of the physiologic storage fluid. If the glass container does not have a tightly fitting top, then during the transportation, the physiologic storage solution can spill out and the teeth can fall, once again, on the floor and, at the same time, be out of a physiologic environment.

=== Maintenance of normal cell metabolism ===
Normally metabolizing tooth root cells have an internal cell pressure (osmolality) of 280–300 mOs and a pH of 7.2. When there is an uninterrupted blood supply, all of the metabolites (calcium, phosphate, potassium) and glucose that the cells require are provided. When the tooth is knocked out, this normal blood supply is cut off and within 15 minutes most of the stored metabolites have been depleted and the cells will begin to die. Within one to two hours, enough cells will die that rejection of the tooth by the body at a later time is the usual outcome. The method by which the body rejects the replanted tooth is a process called "replacement root resorption". During this process, the tooth root cells become necrotic (dead) and will activate the immunologic mechanism of the body to attempt to remove this necrotic layer and literally eats away the tooth root. This is called "root resorption". It is a slow, but non-painful, process that is sometimes not observed by x-rays for years. Once this process starts, it is irreversible, and the tooth will eventually fall out. In growing children, this can cause bone development problems because the replacement resorption (also termed ankylosis) attaches the tooth firmly to the jawbone and stops normal tooth eruption and impedes normal jaw growth.

Research has shown that the critical factor for reduction of the death of the tooth root cells and the subsequent root replacement resorption following reimplantation of knocked-out teeth is maintenance of normal cell physiology and metabolism of the cells left on the tooth root while the tooth is out of the socket. In order to maintain this normalcy, the environment in which the teeth are stored must supply the optimum internal cell pressure, cell nutrients and pH.

=== Storage media ===
Immediate replantation, where the tooth is quickly reinserted into its socket, is the best course of action to preserve the tooth's viability and function. However, due to various factors such as the condition of the avulsed tooth, patient circumstances, or delay in accessing dental care, immediate replantation might not always be possible.

In cases where immediate replantation is not feasible, selecting an appropriate storage medium to preserve the viability of the periodontal ligament (PDL) cells becomes paramount. These cells are essential for the successful reintegration of the tooth into its socket, aiding the healing process and preventing resorption. Storage media serve the critical role of maintaining cell viability by providing an environment with suitable pH, osmolality, and nutrient content, thereby sustaining cell health until the tooth can be properly replanted. The International Association of Dental Traumatology (IADT) guidelines stress the importance of minimizing the tooth's dry time and choosing an effective storage medium to enhance replantation success.

Universally considered the most preferred storage medium for avulsed teeth, milk's effectiveness is attributed to its pH level and osmolality, which closely resemble the natural conditions necessary for sustaining PDL cell viability. Milk's widespread availability, combined with its nutritional content, provides an optimal environment that supports the survival of PDL cells during the critical period before replantation. Research indicates that the type of milk (e.g., whole, skimmed, or low-fat) can play a role in the preservation efficacy, with whole milk often recommended for its balanced nutrient composition. However, any readily available milk can serve as an effective temporary storage medium, making it a practical choice in emergency situations.

Hank's Balanced Salt Solution (HBSS) is a medically formulated solution containing essential nutrients designed to preserve avulsed teeth until they can be replanted. HBSS is distinguished by its balanced pH and osmolality, closely simulating the natural conditions necessary for the survival of periodontal ligament (PDL) cells. The solution has demonstrated effectiveness in maintaining PDL cell viability for up to 48 hours.

Despite its effectiveness, HBSS is not as commonly available for immediate use as household items like milk, which poses a challenge in emergency dental care situations. However, it remains highly recommended in dental trauma care, especially in commercial preparations tailored for dental emergencies. These preparations are specifically designed to replenish lost metabolites, providing an optimal environment for the temporary storage of avulsed teeth and significantly enhancing the prospect of successful replantation.

Recent evidence suggests oral rehydration solutions, propolis, rice water, and even cling film might also be beneficial for preserving cell viability, though further validation is needed.

Saline solution and pure water are discouraged due to their lack of essential nutrients and hypotonic nature, respectively, which can lead to decreased viability of PDL cells. Other alternatives like coconut water, egg white, and various probiotic solutions have shown mixed effectiveness. However, ongoing research continues to explore the viability of other natural and synthetic substances as potential storage media. The exploration into these alternatives aims to identify solutions that might offer practical benefits similar to or better than those provided by milk, especially in scenarios where milk may not be immediately available.

== Prognosis ==
Despite the treatment provided, dental avulsion carries one of the poorest outcomes with 73–96% of the replanted teeth eventually being lost. There are three main factors which significantly influence the prognosis of the tooth. These include:

- The extent of damage to the periodontal ligament (PDL) at the time of injury
- The storage conditions of the avulsed tooth
- The duration of time the tooth was out of its socket prior to replantation

Additionally, the choice of treatment is closely related to the maturity of the root (open or closed apex) and the condition of the PDL cells, which is dependent on the time out of the mouth and the storage medium used. Minimizing the dry time is crucial for the survival of the PDL cells, with viability sharply declining after an extra-alveolar dry time of 30 minutes.

From a clinical perspective, assessing the condition of the PDL cells is vital, classifying the avulsed tooth into one of three groups before treatment. These include:

- PDL cells are most likely viable, replanted immediately or within a short time;
- PDL cells may be viable but compromised, stored in a medium like milk or HBSS with a dry time of less than 60 minutes;
- PDL cells are likely non-viable, with a dry time of more than 60 minutes, regardless of storage medium.

This classification guides dentists in prognosis and treatment decisions, though exceptions occur.

PDL healing is the primary outcome measure when assessing interventions for tooth avulsion. When the healing of the PDL is unfavorable it means that there is no longer protection for the root from the surrounding alveolar bone. The bone that surrounds the tooth is continually undergoing physiological remodeling. Over time, the root is gradually replaced by bone, which leads to tooth loss.

The results of replanting permanent incisor teeth can be divided into short, medium and long-term survival of the tooth. If the tooth is replanted it acts in the short term to maintain space, maintain bone and provide good to excellent aesthetics. If unfavorable healing has occurred, the tooth can last into the medium term for 2-10+ years depending on the speed of bone turnover. Long-term survival of the tooth only happens when favorable healing of the periodontal ligament has occurred. If this happens, the tooth can be estimated to survive as long as any other tooth.

== Epidemiology ==
Research has shown that more than five million teeth are knocked-out each year in the United States. Dental avulsion is a type of dental trauma, and the prevalence of dental trauma is estimated at 17.5% and varies with geographical area. Although dental trauma is relatively low, dental avulsion is the fourth most prevalent type of dental trauma.

Dental avulsion is more prevalent in males than females. Males are three times more likely to suffer from dental avulsion than females.

Up to 25% of school-aged children and military trainees experience some kind of dental trauma each year. The occurrence of dental avulsion in school aged children ranges from 0.5 to 16% of all dental trauma. Many of these teeth are knocked-out during school activities or sporting events such as contact sports, football, basketball, and hockey. It is important for laypersons who are related to children, working, or witnessing sports that they be educated on this subject matter. Being educated could aid in minimizing injuries that could do further harm to the victim. Being informed and spreading awareness of dental avulsion, its treatment, and prevention could make an impact.

== History ==
The first reported cases of knocked-out teeth being replanted was by Pare in 1593. In 1706, Pierre Fauchard also reported replanting knocked out teeth. Wigoper in 1933 used a cast gold splint to hold reimplanted teeth in place. In 1959, Lenstrup and Skieller declared that the success rate of replanted knocked out teeth should be considered a temporary procedure because the success rate of less than 10% was so poor. In 1966 in a retrospective study, Andreasen theorized that 90% of avulsed teeth could be successfully retained if they were replanted within the first 30 minutes of the accident. In 1974, Cvek showed that removal of the dental pulp following reimplantation was necessary to prevent resorption of the tooth root. In 1974, Cvek showed that storage of knocked out teeth in saline could improve the success of replanted teeth. In 1977, Lindskog et al. showed that the key to retention of the knocked-out teeth was to maintain the vitality of the periodontal ligament. In 1980, Blomlof showed that storing the periodontal ligament cells in a biocompatible medium could extend the extra oral time to four hours or more. He found that the best storage medium was a medical research fluid called Hank's Balanced Solution. In this study, it was serendipitously discovered that milk could also maintain cell viability for two hours. In 1981, Andreasen showed that crushing of cells on the tooth root could cause death of the cells and lead to resorption and reduction in prognosis. In 1983, Matsson et al. showed that soaking in Hank's Balanced Solution for thirty minutes prior to reimplantation could revitalize extracted dog's teeth that were dry for 60 minutes. In 1989, a systematic storage device was developed to optimally store and preserve knocked out teeth. In 1992, Trope et al. showed that extracted dog's teeth could be stored in Hank's Balanced Solution for up to 96 hours and still maintain significant vitality. In this study, milk was only able to maintain vitality for two hours.

== Archaeology ==
In ancient times, ritual dental avulsion was widespread among different cultures around the world. For example, it was common during the Early Holocene (from around 11,500 BP up to 5,000 BP) in North Africa and was occasionally observed in the Natufian culture (14,000 to 11,500 BP).

Such tooth avulsion was the intentional removal of one or more teeth, which was done for ritual or aesthetic reasons. It was also used to denote group affiliation. Typically, the maxillary incisors were the teeth most often selected for removal. This practice is still common in parts of Africa.

== See also ==
- Dental emergency
- Dental trauma
