= Avulsion fracture =

Bone fracture classification

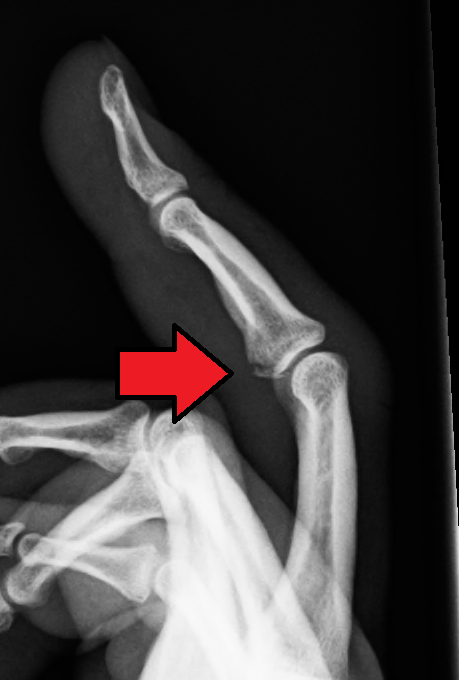
- Avulsion fracture of the proximal middle phalanx on the palm side
- Specialty: Orthopedic

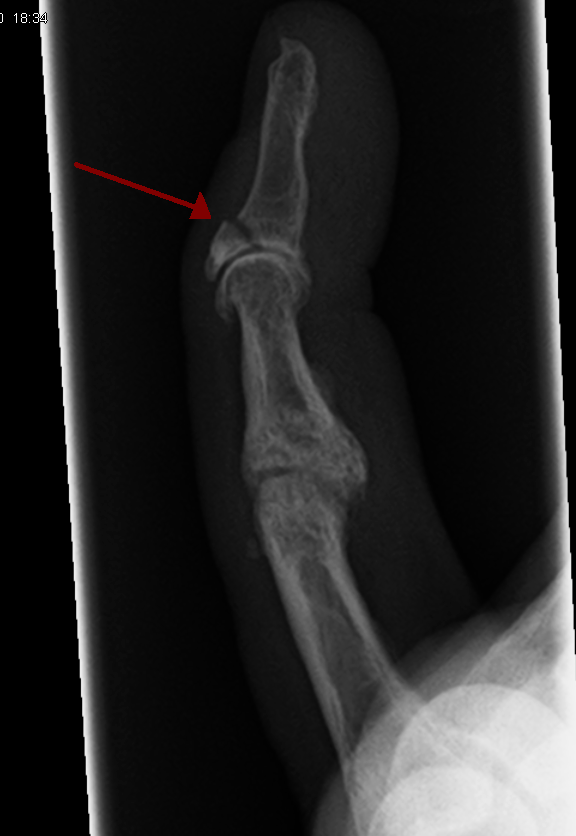
Avulsion fracture of a fingertip bone

An avulsion fracture is a bone fracture which occurs when a fragment of bone tears away from the main mass of bone as a result of physical trauma. This can occur at the ligament by the application of forces external to the body (such as a fall or pull) or at the tendon by a muscular contraction that is stronger than the forces holding the bone together. Generally muscular avulsion is prevented by the neurological limitations placed on muscle contractions. Highly trained athletes can overcome this neurological inhibition of strength and produce a much greater force output capable of breaking or avulsing a bone.

== Types ==
=== Dental avulsion ===
Dental avulsion is the complete traumatic displacement of a tooth from its socket in alveolar bone. It is a serious dental emergency in which prompt management (within 20–40 minutes of injury) affects the prognosis of the tooth.

=== Tuberosity avulsion of the 5th metatarsal ===
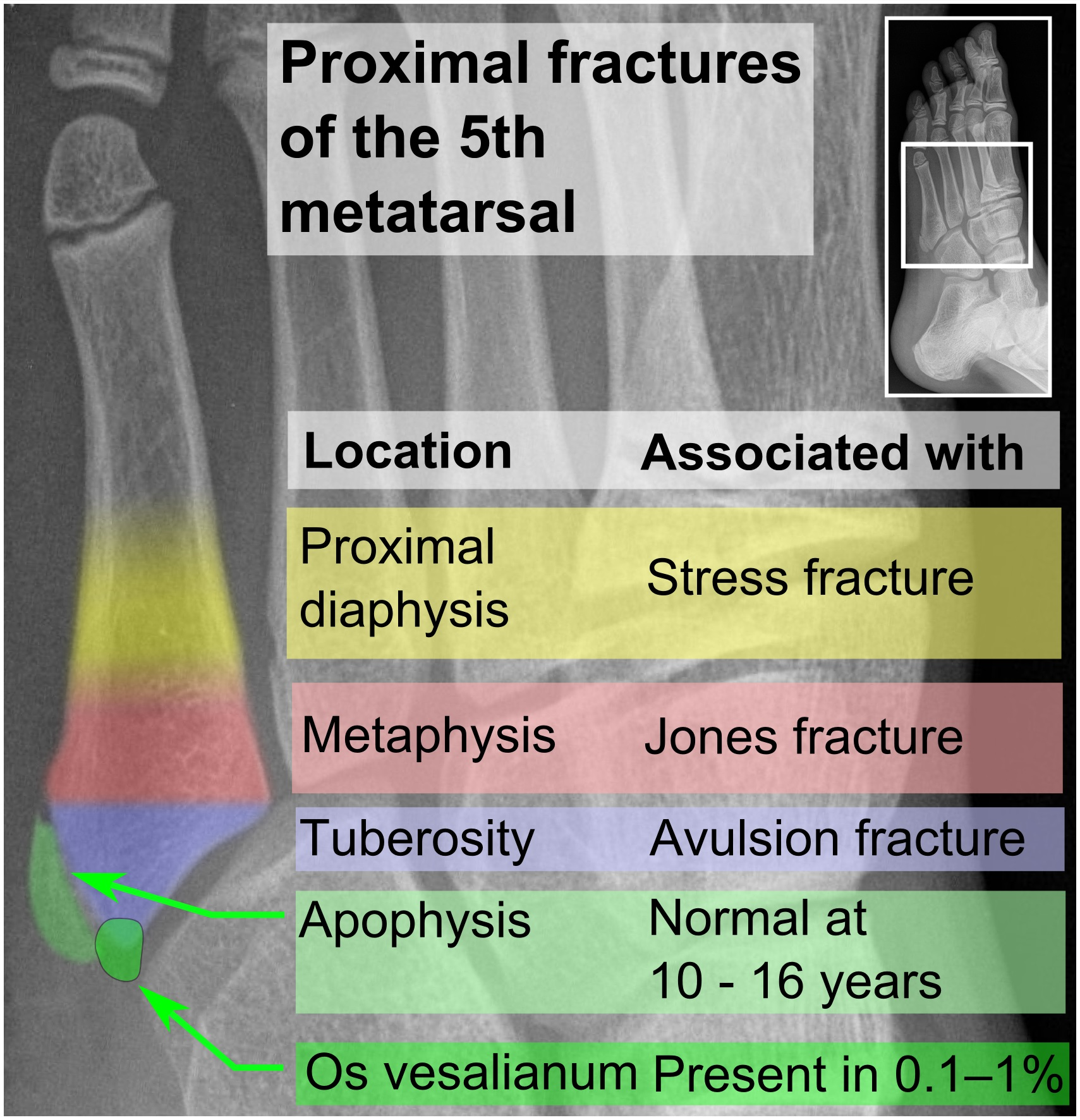
Proximal fractures of 5th metatarsal

The tuberosity avulsion fracture (also known as pseudo-Jones fracture or dancer's fracture is a common fracture of the fifth metatarsal (the bone on the outside edge of the foot extending to the little toe). This fracture is likely caused by the lateral band of the plantar aponeurosis (tendon). Most of these fractures are treated with a hard-soled shoe or walking cast. This is needed until the pain goes away and then the patient can return to normal activities. Healing is usually completed within eight weeks.

=== Tibial tuberosity avulsion ===
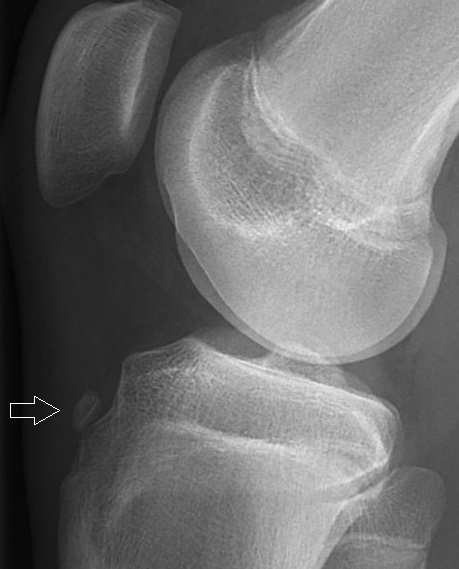
X-ray of a 15-year-old male, showing an older avulsion fracture of the tibial tuberosity.

A tibial tuberosity avulsion fracture is an incomplete or complete separation of the tibial tuberosity from the tibia. This occurs as a result of a violent contraction of the quadriceps muscles, most often as a result of a high-power jump. Incomplete fractures are usually treatable with the traditional RICE (rest, ice, compression, elevation) method, but complete/displaced fractures will most often require surgery to pin the tuberosity back in place. Tibial tuberosity avulsions occur most often in teenagers that engage in a large amount of sporting activities, and many studies have shown a history with Osgood-Schlatter's disease to be linked to the fracture.

== Treatment ==
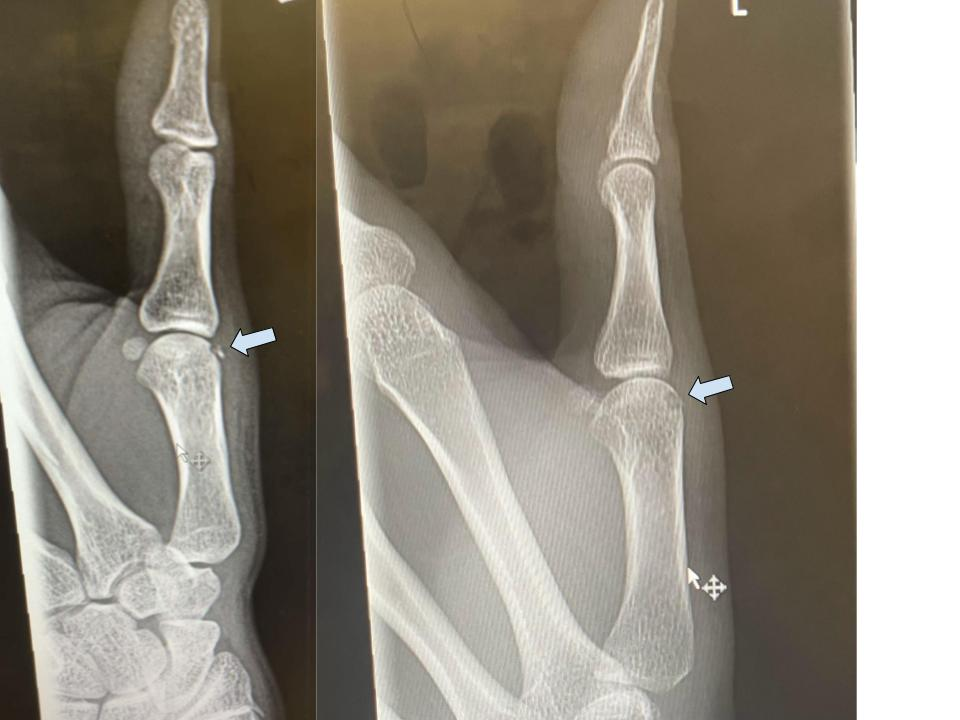
X-ray of an avulsion fracture of the head of the first (thumb) metacarpal on the left hand of a 16-year-old male, images taken one day and seven weeks after the injury, respectively.

If the fracture is small, it is usually sufficient to treat with rest and support bandage, but in more severe cases, surgery may be required. Ice may be used to relieve swelling.

Displaced avulsion fractures are best managed by either open reduction and internal fixation or closed reduction and pinning. Open reduction (using surgical incision) and internal fixation is used when pins, screws, or similar hardware is needed to fix the bone fragment.

== Other animals ==
=== Dinosaurs ===
In 2001, Bruce Rothschild and other paleontologists published a study examining evidence for tendon avulsions in theropod dinosaurs. Among the dinosaurs studied, avulsion injuries were only noted among Tyrannosaurus and Allosaurus. Scars from these sorts of injuries were limited to the humerus and scapula. A divot on the humerus of Sue the T. rex was one such avulsion. The divot appears to be located at the origin of the deltoid or teres major muscles. The localization in theropod scapulae as evidenced by the tendon avulsion in Sue suggests that theropods may have had a musculature more complex and functionally different from those of their descendants, the birds.

== See also ==
- Mallet finger
- Segond fracture
