= Pre-eruption guidance =

Orthodontic treatment method

Pre-eruption guidance is an orthodontic treatment method that allows for expansion of existing erupting teeth long before they appear in the mouth. The use off pre-eruption guidance appliances and the timing of extractions of certain deciduous teeth aligns the teeth naturally as opposed to orthodontic mechanical movement of permanent teeth into alignment after they have erupted. Research shows that pre-eruption guidance produces far more stable tooth alignment than alternative treatments.

As defined by the American Dental Association and the American Association of Orthodontists, pre-eruption guidance therapy uses bimaxillary bilateral removable space maintainers alongside precisely timed removal of the maxillary right and left deciduous cuspids (baby teeth) to promote an optimal eruption pattern for permanent teeth.

Pre-eruption guidance is distinctive because unlike other approaches, a patients' treatment results are achieved physiologically through muscle movements and removable functional spacer maintainers. instead of mechanically through dental braces. This alleviates the need for braces to mechanically align or essentially repair the effects of mature teeth that erupted misaligned and crowded.

== Guidance ==
This form of early, interceptive orthodontic treatment can be started on certain types of tooth problems before all teeth have erupted. Pre-eruption guidance treatment is usually begun after the four permanent upper and lower front teeth have erupted (approximately age seven). The goal of this treatment for a child of that age is to normalize and naturalize the dentition and then to allow the daily use of durable orthodontic retainers and the patient's natural muscle development to guide future erupting teeth into an optimal position in the mouth over time.

In some cases a second phase of treatment is necessary. This additional phase is significantly shorter and can be completed by the time patients who are not undergoing pre-eruption guidance are first beginning their treatments.

Cases in which the pre-eruption guidance process would be beneficial include improvement of dental alignment and correction of a functional occlusion (severe deep bite, severe overjet, constricted maxillary width, blocked out maxillary cuspids, lower crowding).

One benefit of the pre-eruption guidance approach is not having to surgically remove any of the patient's permanent teeth. Additionally, patients undergoing pre-eruption guidance therapy often do not require a later phase of treatment involving application of fixed braces or permanent tooth extractions performed by an oral surgeon. This preventive treatment process may ensure a patient's teeth will erupt in a more ideal position and maintain their erupted position for the rest of the patients life. However, like any orthodontic treatment, it is heavily dependent on the patients cooperation and support to succeed.

Due to the method's reliance on achieving results working with the patient's own physiology to align their teeth, practitioners help the patients achieve proper alignment for minimal cost. Patients may also avoid more expensive, later staged treatments involving permanent tooth extractions, longer time with fixed appliances, and additional visits to the orthodontist.
