= Intraosseous eruption =

Stage of tooth eruption

Intraosseous eruption is a stage of tooth eruption that directly precedes the baby tooth emerging from the gums. This stage involves the formation of root of a tooth which allows the tooth to erupt from the bone. It precedes the supraosseous eruption phase which consists of infragingival eruption and supragingival eruption. Both the intraosseous eruption and supraosseous eruption are part of an eruption phase called prefunctional eruption.
