= Sophie the Giraffe =

Rubber teething toy

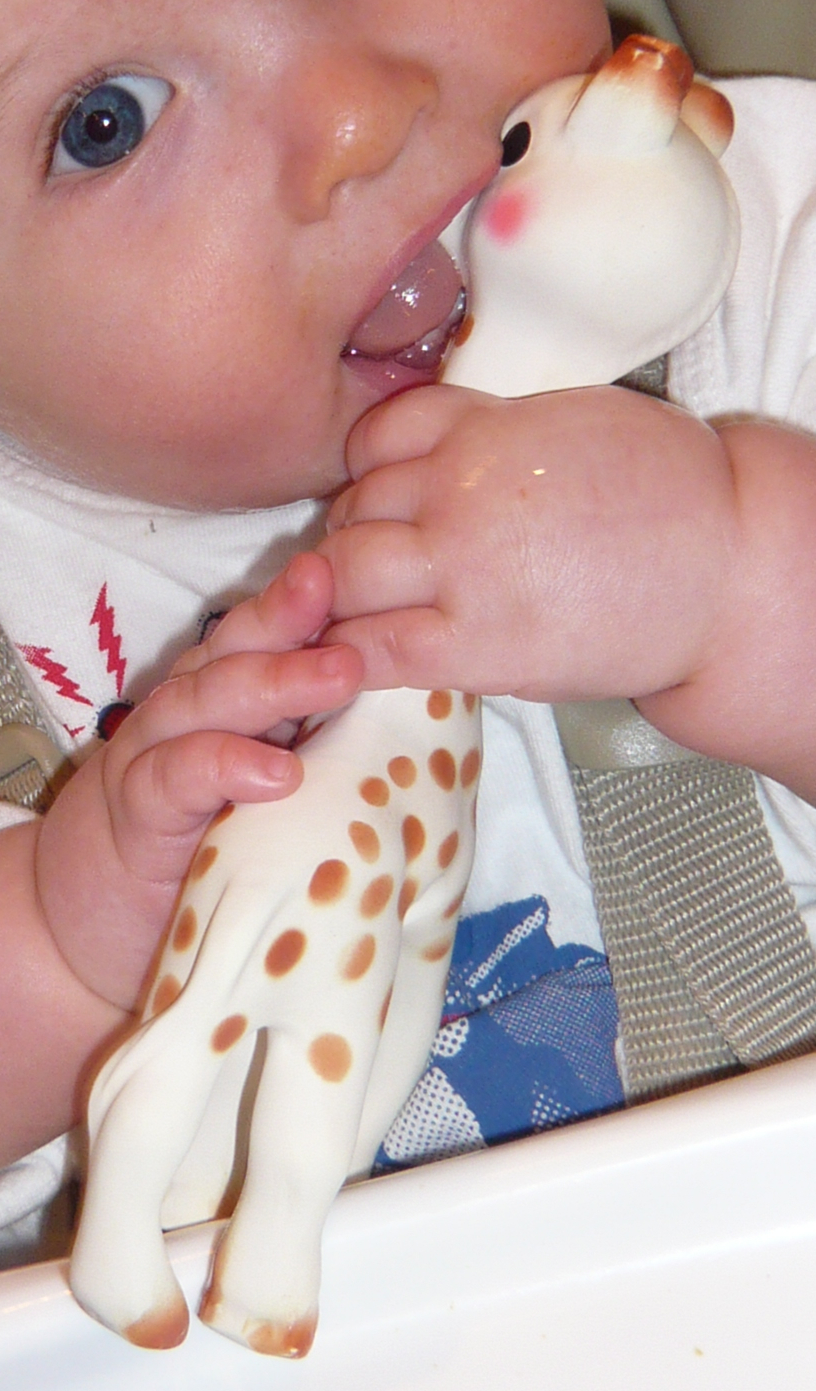
Sophie the Giraffe

Sophie the Giraffe is a teether – a toy for teething infants to chew on – in the form of a 7-inch-high (180 mm) hevea rubber giraffe.

== History ==
The toy used to be made in France (as Sophie la Girafe) starting in 1961, first in Asnières-sur-Oise, near Paris by Delacoste then from 1991 by Vulli based in Rumilly in the French Alps. Its name refers to its launch on 25 May 1961, the feast day of Saint Madeleine Sophie Barat. It has achieved national icon status in France, according to Slate, with more sold each year (816,000 in 2010) than babies are born (796,000).

Sophie is also popular in the United States where the toy has been available for decades and even appeared in the movie Three Men and a Baby (1987) and where it has become the best-selling baby product offered by Amazon.com. Launched in California in the trendy Hollywood area, it became popular through word of mouth, especially on Amazon.com since 2008. The reasons proposed for this success are that it is marketed as eco-friendly and a growing consumer mistrust of the security and health standards of products made in China since 2007.

In 2009, Sophie was recognized as Product of the Year by the American Specialty Toy Retailing Association.

In May 2026, an investigation by French outlet Mediapart revealed that Vulli had been manufacturing Sophie la Girafe in China since approximately 2013, with French production having ceased entirely by 2019. The company's factory in Rumilly, French Alps, was maintained as a façade—staffed only during client or press visits, with expired raw materials on the line. Despite this, toys continued to be sold bearing a "made in France" label until at least a 2025 inspection prompted French authorities to open an investigation into suspected deceptive commercial practices. Vulli subsequently rebranded its French packaging to read "born in Paris," but its Tmall flagship store in China continued to list France as the country of manufacture.

== Health concerns ==
The November 2011 issue of German consumer magazine Öko-Test reported that Sophie the Giraffe should not be sold in Germany due to a violation of statutory limit values for nitrosatable substances. The test found 0.781 mg/kg, while the German Bedarfsgegenständeverordnung (BedGgstV) consumer food and product standard provides for a limit of 0.1 mg/kg. Vulli initially said that another regulation applies, the EU guidelines for toys, with a limit of 1 mg/kg, and obtained a preliminary injunction of the District Court in Berlin banning publication of Öko-Test's report. The story was removed from the magazine's website. This injunction was lifted in January 2012.

The Chemische und Veterinäruntersuchungsamt Stuttgart (CVUA) reproduced Öko-Test's claims resulting in the German Technischer Überwachungsverein (TÜV) safety agency pressing charges against Vulli, and Öko-Test restored the online report to their web site. Vulli responded by recalling Sophie the Giraffe and similar products from German retailers, and offering to exchange it with one produced on or after March 2012, which Vulli says adhere to the stricter German limit.
