= Katherine Vig =

American orthodontist

- Born: Hampshire, England
- Education: University of St. Andrews
- Known for: First woman to receive Albert H. Ketcham Award, Past President of American Cleft Palate-Craniofacial Association
- Medical career
- Profession: Dentist
- Institutions: University of North Carolina, University of Michigan, University of Pittsburgh, The Ohio State University
- Sub-specialties: Orthodontics
- Research: Cleft Lip & Palate

Katherine Vig is an American orthodontist. Vig is the past president of American Cleft Palate-Craniofacial Association.

== Career ==
Vig received her dental degree from Dundee Dental School at the University of St Andrews, Scotland. She then did her orthodontic training at Eastman Dental Hospital, London. In 1976, she moved to the United States and started teaching at the Orthodontic department at University of North Carolina School of Dentistry. In 1984, she then moved to University of Michigan School of Dentistry, where she was an associated professor in the department of Orthodontics. In 1990, she moved to University of Pittsburgh School of Dental Medicine and became the chair of the Department of Orthodontics and associate director of the Cleft Palate-Craniofacial Center. In 1994, she moved to Ohio State University College of Dentistry and became the chair of their Division of Orthodontics. She currently serves as an external examiner for the National University of Singapore Dental Schools' orthodontic Program. Vig currently serves as one of the reviewers for the American Journal of Orthodontics, Cleft-Palate-Craniofacial Journal and British Journal of Orthodontics. Vig has published over 100 scientific articles and has co-authored 3 textbooks.

== See also ==
- Failure of eruption of teeth
