= Teether =

Toy for teething babies to chew on

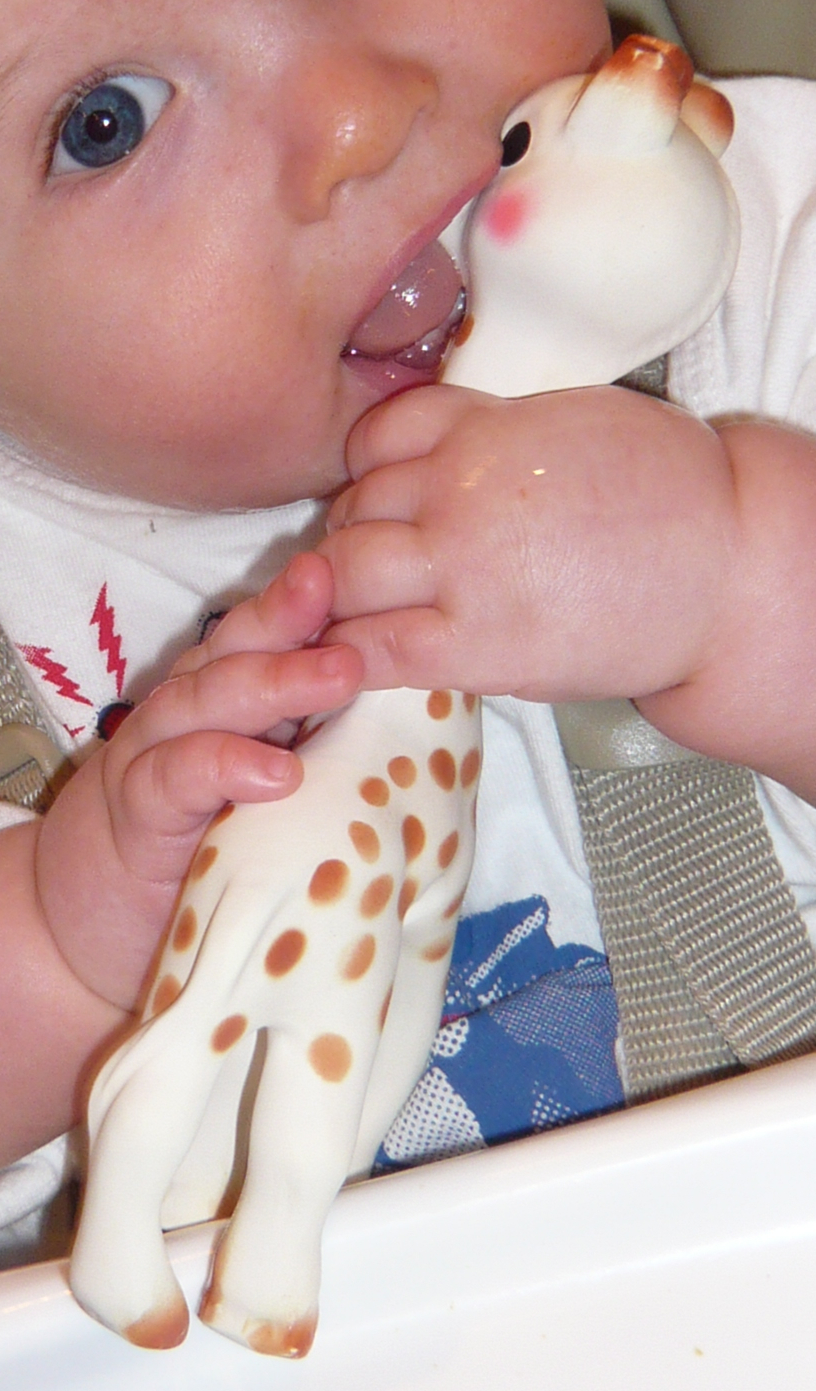
Sophie the Giraffe, a popular teether

A teether, teething toy, or chew toy is a device given to teething infants. It has the effect of reducing the pain of irritable teeth. Most modern teethers are silicone, but can also be made of wood or rubber. Some teethers are filled with a fluid or gel that can be frozen or refrigerated. They differ from pacifiers in that they are intended to be chewed, rather than sucked on. They come in a variety of different shapes. Teethers may help relieve teething pain and help new teeth penetrate the gum, as well as provide a form of entertainment. Studies found that chewing a teether may make teething children calmer and happier, less stressed, and less cranky. Teething necklaces and teething bracelets may pose a choking hazard to infants and toddlers depending on the teething parts, and have prompted recalls. Teethers filled with liquid have also been recalled because of bacterial contamination. Early teethers were often teething rings.

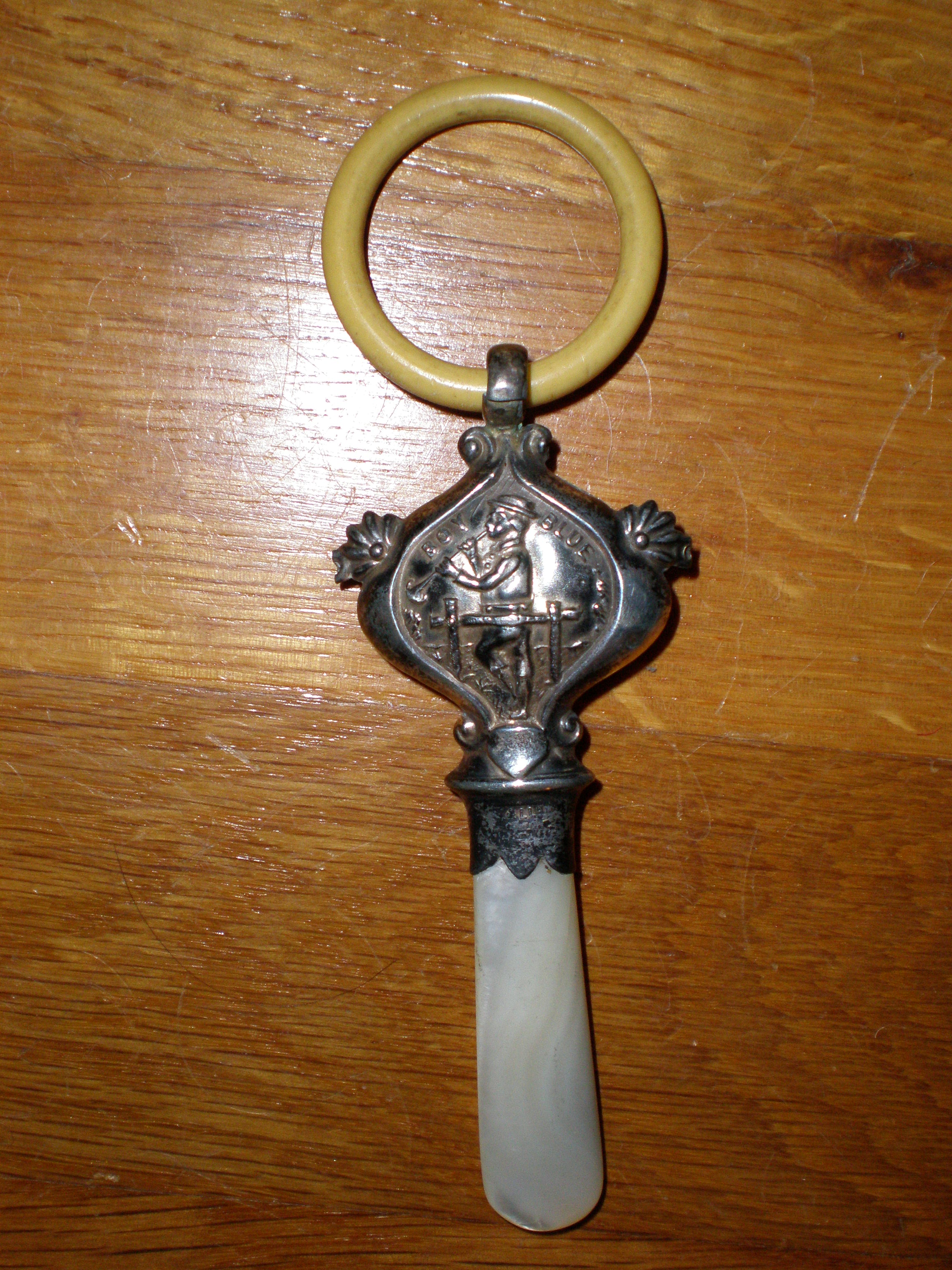
Early twentieth century teething ring

Teething biscuits, like rusks and ladyfingers, can also be given for teething.
