= Segond fracture =

Avulsion fracture of the lateral tibial condyle of the knee

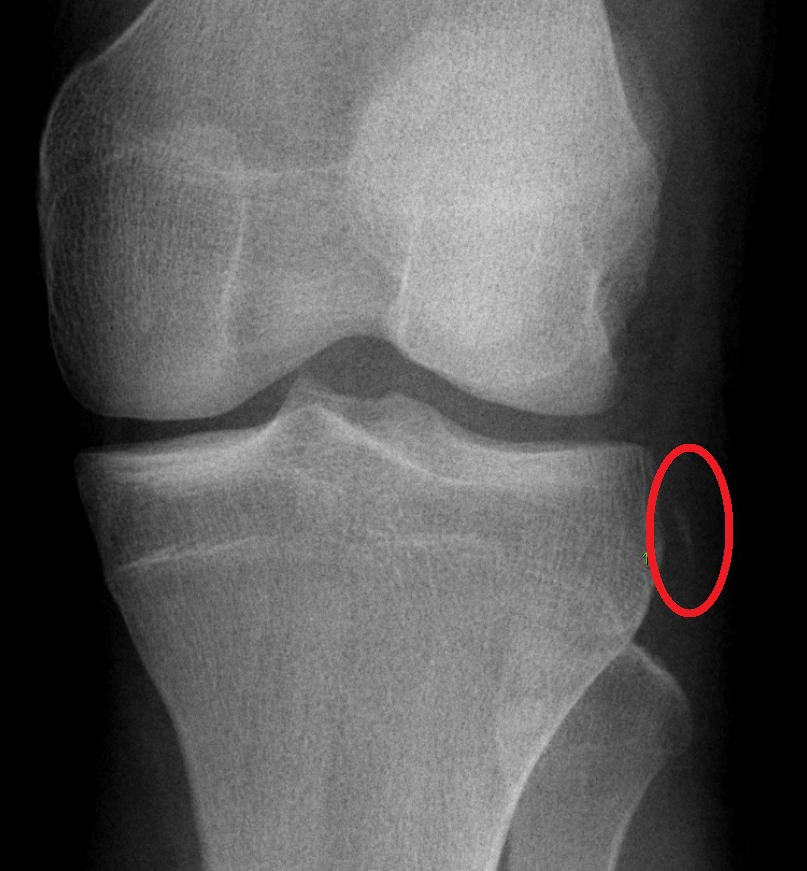
- Segond fracture of left knee
- Specialty: Orthopedic

The Segond fracture is a type of avulsion fracture (soft tissue structures pulling off fragments of their bony attachment) from the lateral tibial plateau of the knee, immediately below the articular surface of the tibia (see photo).

== Clinical significance ==
Because of the high rate of associated ligamentous and meniscal injury, the presence of a Segond or reverse Segond fracture requires that these other pathologies must be specifically ruled out. Or more pragmatically, the orthopaedic team assume that the presence of Segond fracture equals ACL rupture, as the correlation is close to 100%. Increasingly, reconstruction of the ACL is combined with reconstruction of the anterolateral ligament when this associated pathology is present. The long-term benefit of an associated Anterolateral Ligament (ALL) reconstruction at the time of ACL surgery is not known. Attention and research is also being paid to a Lateral extra-articular Tenodesis (LET) instead of ALL.

== Diagnosis ==
Segond and reverse Segond fractures are characterized by a small avulsion, or "chip", fragment of characteristic size that is best seen on plain radiography in the anterior-posterior plane. The avulsed fragment of bone may be very difficult to see on the plain x-ray exam, and may be better seen on computed tomography. MRI may be useful for visualization of the associated bone marrow edema of the underlying tibial plateau on fat-saturated T2W and STIR images, as well as the associated findings of ligamentous and/or meniscal injury.

== History ==
Originally described by Dr. Paul Segond in 1879 after a series of cadaveric experiments, the Segond fracture occurs in association with tears of the anterior cruciate ligament (ACL) (75–100%) and injury to the medial meniscus (66–75%), lateral capsular ligament (now known as the Anterolateral ligament, or ALL), as well as injury to the structures behind the knee.

A rare, mirror image of the Segond fracture has also been described. The so-called "reverse Segond fracture" can occur after an avulsion fracture of the tibial component of the medial collateral ligament (MCL) in association with posterior cruciate ligament (PCL) and medial meniscal tears.

Segond fracture is typically the result of abnormal varus, or "bowing", stress to the knee, combined with internal rotation of the tibia. Reverse Segond fracture, as its name suggests, is caused by abnormal valgus, or "knock-knee", stress and external rotation.

Originally thought to be a result of avulsion of the medial third of the lateral collateral ligament, the Segond fracture has been shown by more recent research to relate also to the insertion of the iliotibial tract (ITT) and the anterior oblique band (AOB), a ligamentous attachment of the fibular collateral ligament (FCL), to the midportion of the lateral tibia and to be associated with avulsion by the anterolateral ligament (ALL).
