= Paul Segond =

French surgeon (1851–1912)

Paul Ferdinand Segond
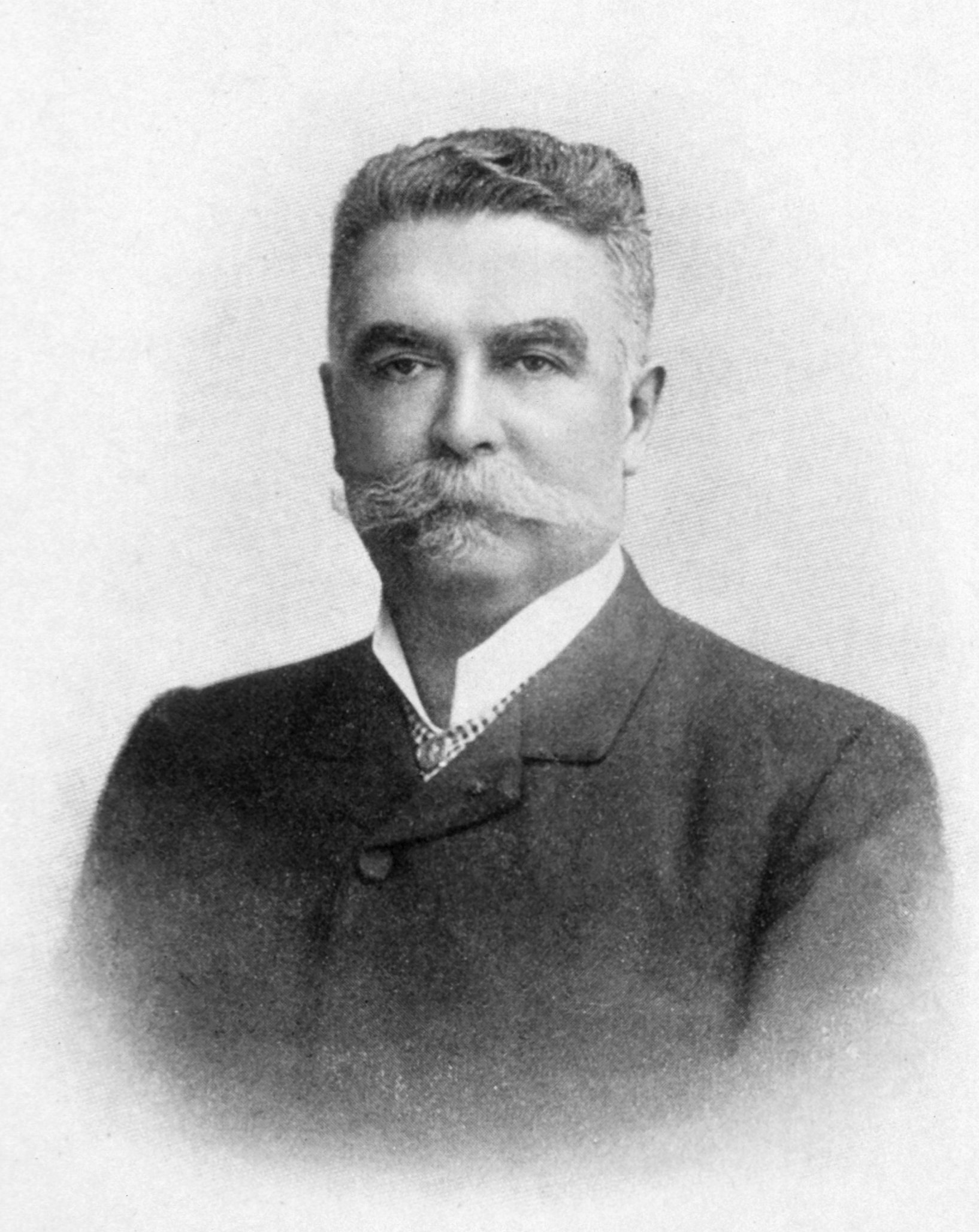
- Paul Segond
- Born: 8 May 1851; Paris
- Died: 27 October 1912 (aged 61); Paris
- Education: Faculté de médecine de Paris of the University of Paris
- Years active: 1875–1912
- Known for: Segond fracture, vaginal hysterectomy
- Relatives: Son-in-law of Juliette Adam; Father-in-law of Ernest Fourneau; Grandfather of Jean-Claude Fourneau
- Medical career
- Profession: Surgeon
- Institutions: Hôpitaux de Paris; Académie Nationale de Médecine; Société de chirurgie de Paris; Pitié-Salpêtrière Hospital
- Sub-specialties: Obstetrics and gynaecology, Knee surgery

Paul Ferdinand Segond (8 May 1851 in Paris – 27 October 1912 in Paris) was a French surgeon who was a founder of obstetrics and the teaching of gynaecology in Paris. He was also an expert on the knee and described the eponymous Segond fracture.

== Biography ==
Paul Segond was born in Paris, the son of anatomist Louis-Auguste Segond (1819–1908). He studied medicine in Paris, becoming an intern in 1875, having already published a letter on "weight of newborns" in the Annales de gynécologie. He became prosector at the Faculté de médecine de Paris of the University of Paris in 1878. He qualified docteur en médecine in 1880, with his thesis on Abcès chauds de la prostate et le phlegmon périprostatique (hot abscesses of the prostate and periprostatic phlegmon) being honoured by the Société de Chirurgie and French Academy of Sciences.

He became an associate professor of surgery in 1883, and was made chef de clinique at Pitié-Salpêtrière Hospital alongside Ulysse Trélat later in the same year. In 1905, he succeeded Paul Jules Tillaux in the chair of surgery at the Faculté de médecine de Paris, a position which he held until his death. In 1909, he was elected as a member of the French Académie Nationale de Médecine.

== Work ==
In the early part of his career, Segond's contributions concerned the urinary system with publications including his work on prostatic abscess. Subsequently, he turned his attention to gynaecological surgery, and in particular influenced by the work of Jules-Émile Péan, he perfected the technique of hysterectomy by the vaginal approach; he also used this approach to remove cancers and perform myomectomies. Treatment of uterine or periuterine infection by vaginal hysterectomy became known as the Péan–Segond operation (Opération de Péan-Segond (in French)).

Segond also published in other areas of surgery, and described his eponymous knee fracture in association with anterior cruciate ligament injury in 1879.
