= Failure of eruption of teeth =

- Specialty: Oral and maxillofacial surgery
- Types: Primary and mechanical
- Causes: Genetic or mechanical
- Treatment: Extraction, implant, osteotomy

Failure of eruption of teeth happens when a single or multiple teeth fail to erupt in the mouth. This can happen due to many reasons which may include obstruction from primary teeth, bone surrounding the unerupted tooth or other mechanical factors. The two types of failure of eruption are primary failure of eruption and mechanical failure of eruption. Primary failure of eruption has been known to be associated with Parathyroid hormone 1 receptor mutation.

== Primary failure of eruption ==
The term primary failure of eruption was named by William Proffit and Katherine Vig in 1981. This type of failure of eruption has a genetic or familial background precursor as a cause. The prevalence is of PFE is about 0.06% in population. In this type of failure, teeth that are non-ankylosed fail to erupt in the mouth. These teeth do not have a precursor tooth that is blocking their path. These teeth tend to erupt partially but then fail to erupt as the time goes on. Profitt stated that only the posterior teeth are the ones to be affected and all the teeth which are distal to the affected tooth are also affected. Both permanent and primary teeth may equally be affected. This often results in posterior open bite in patients mouth who have primary failure of eruption. This phenomenon can occur in any quadrant of the mouth.

There are two types of primary failure of eruption. Type I involves failure of eruption of teeth distal to the most mesial affected tooth to be all same. Type II involves a greater eruption pattern, not complete, among the teeth distal to the most mesial affected tooth. It is difficult to diagnose between these two types of failure of eruption because 2nd molar does not erupt until a patient is 15 years of age. Plenty of times, patient's receive orthodontic care much before they turn 15 years old. Therefore, to properly diagnose between two types, a patient needs to be over 15 and a definitive proof of uneruption of 2nd molar is required.

=== Management ===
Management of teeth with PFE can include extractions of affected teeth, followed by orthodontic space closure or placement of a prosthetic implant with a bone graft. This option can only be applied to a single tooth that is affected. If multiple teeth are affected then, a segmental osteotomy may be performed to bring the entire segment into occlusion. However, minimal success has been shown following this procedure. These teeth usually are "non-responsive" to the orthodontic force and studies have shown that ankylosis of these teeth can occur if force applied.

== Mechanical failure of eruption ==
This type of failure of eruption takes place when the affected tooth is ankylosed to the bone around it. This is different from primary failure of eruption where the affected tooth/teeth were not ankylosed. In mechanical failure of eruption, affected tooth has partial or complete loss of PDL in a panoramic radiograph and teeth distal to affected tooth do not have this condition. On a percussion test, a tooth with mechanical failure of eruption will have a dull metallic sound.

== Eruption failure related to syndrome ==
There have been many syndromes which have been identified to be related to failure of eruption of teeth. These syndromes are Cleidocranial dysplasia, Osteoporosis, Rutherford syndrome, GAPO syndrome and Osteoglophonic dysplasia.
