= Tooth eruption =

Process in tooth development

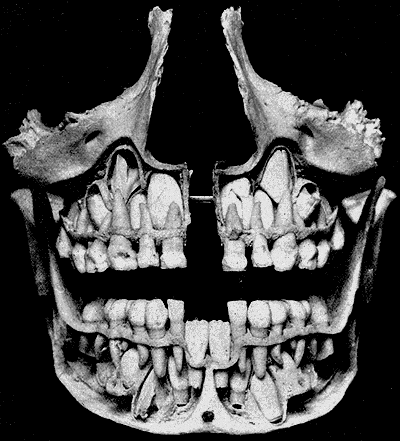
The removed bone reveals permanent teeth below the roots of primary teeth.

Tooth eruption is a process in tooth development in which the teeth enter the mouth and become visible. It is currently believed that the periodontal ligament plays an important role in tooth eruption. The first human teeth to appear, the deciduous (primary) teeth (also known as baby or milk teeth), erupt into the mouth from around 6 months until 2 years of age, in a process known as "teething". These teeth are the only ones in the mouth until a person is about 6 years old, creating the primary dentition stage.

At that time, the first permanent tooth erupts and begins a period in which there is a combination of primary and permanent teeth, known as the mixed dentition stage, which lasts until the last primary tooth is lost. Then, the remaining permanent teeth erupt into the mouth during the permanent dentition stage.

== Theories ==
Although researchers agree that tooth eruption is a complex process, there is little agreement on the identity of the mechanism that controls eruption. There have been many theories over time that have been eventually disproven. According to Growth Displacement Theory, the tooth is pushed upward into the mouth by the growth of the tooth's root in opposite direction. Continued Bone Formation Theory advocated that a tooth is pushed upward by the growth of the bone around the tooth. In addition, some believed teeth were pushed upward by vascular pressure or by an anatomic feature called the cushioned hammock.

The cushioned hammock theory, first proposed by Harry Sicher, was taught widely from the 1930s to the 1950s. This theory postulated that a ligament below a tooth, which Sicher observed under a microscope on a histologic slide, was responsible for eruption. Later, the "ligament" Sicher observed was determined to be merely an artifact created in the process of preparing the slide.

The most widely held current theory is that while several forces might be involved in eruption, the periodontal ligament provides the main impetus for the process. Theorists hypothesize that the periodontal ligament promotes eruption through the shrinking and cross-linking of their collagen fibers and the contraction of their fibroblasts. There is evidence from experimental animals that a traction force is unlikely to be involved in tooth eruption: Animals treated with lathyrogens that interfere with collagen cross-link formation showed similar eruption rates to control animals, provided occlusal forces were removed.

Inherent in most of the theories outlined above is the idea that a force is generated in the periodontal ligament beneath unerupted teeth, and that this force physically drives teeth out through the bone. This idea may have been superseded by a further recent theory. This new theory proposes firstly that areas of tension and compression are generated in the soft tissues surrounding unerupted teeth by the distribution of bite forces through the jaws. These patterns of tension and compression, are further proposed to result in patterns of bone resorption and deposition that lift the tooth into the mouth. This theory is based on Wolff's law, which is the long established idea that bone changes shape in accordance with the forces applied. Significantly, a recent finite element analysis study, analysing the distribution of force through the jaw of an 8-year-old child, observed overall compression in the soft tissues above, and tension in the soft tissues below, unerupted teeth. Because bone resorbs when compressed, and forms under tension, this finite element analysis strongly supports the new theory. Further work is required, however, to confirm this new theory experimentally.

== Timeline ==
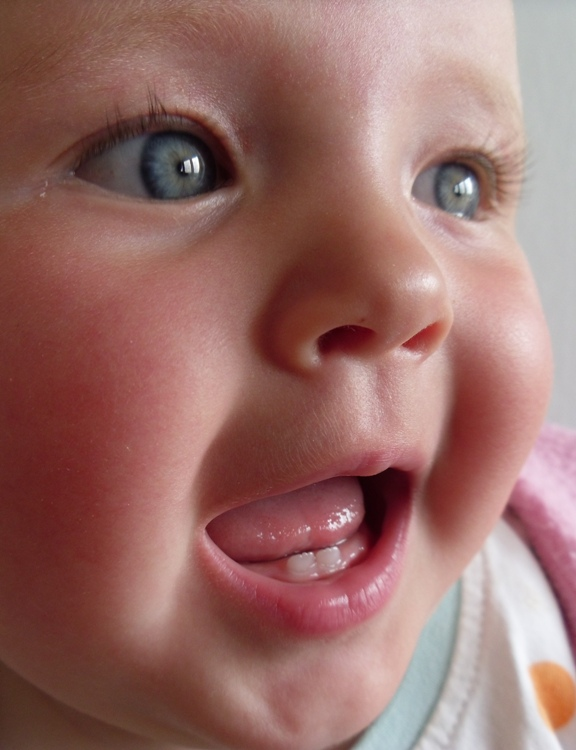
The deciduous mandibular central incisors, shown here in the mouth of a seven-month-old female infant, are the first teeth to erupt.

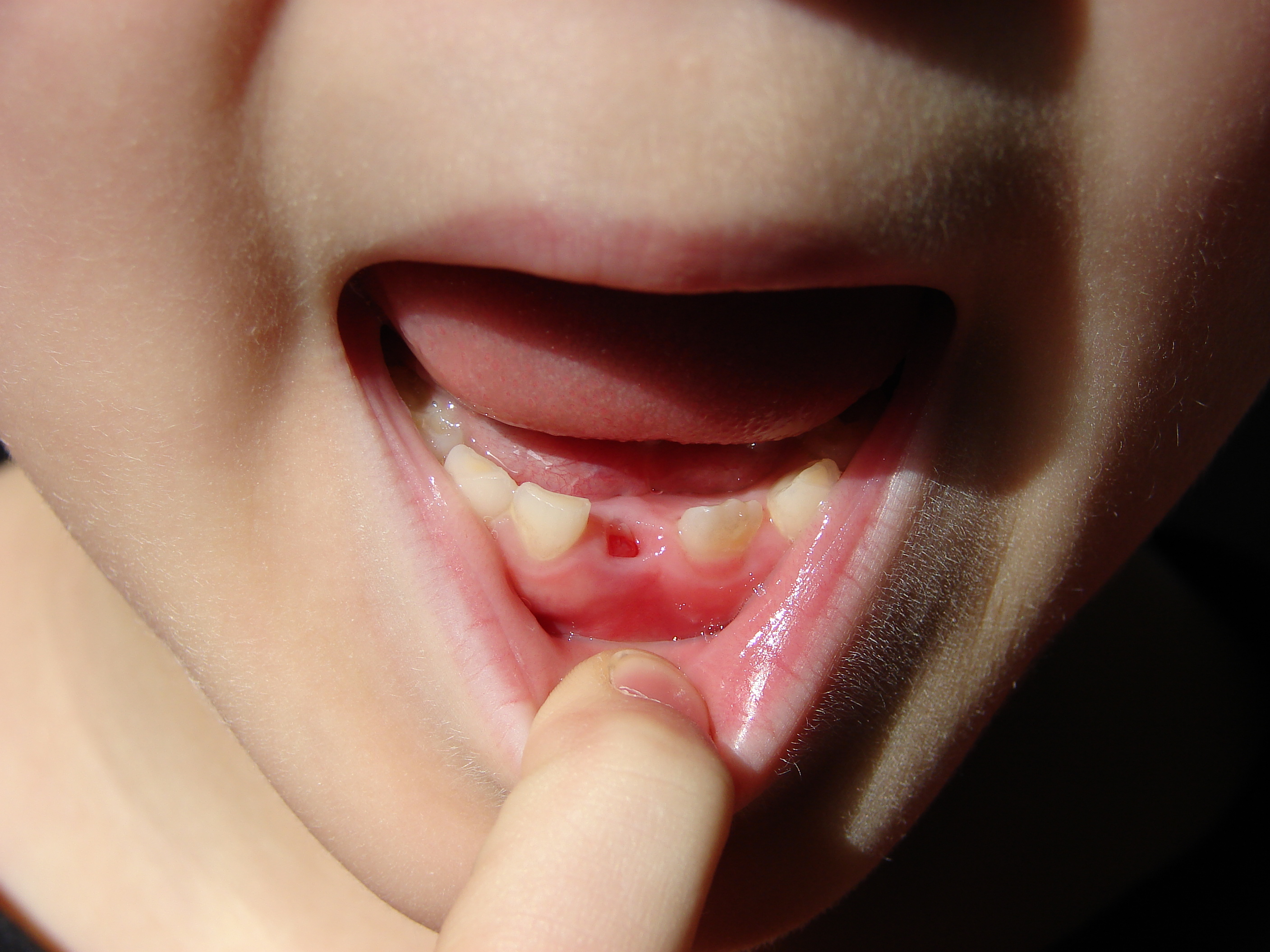
Bottom teeth of a seven-year-old, showing primary teeth (left), a lost primary tooth (middle), and a fully erupted permanent tooth (right)

Although tooth eruption occurs at different times for different people, a general eruption timeline exists. The tooth buds of baby teeth start to develop around 6 weeks of pregnancy. Adult teeth buds start forming around 4 months of pregnancy. The entire tooth will start to form from the crown down to the root. Typically, humans have 20 primary teeth and 32 permanent teeth. The dentition goes through three stages. The first, known as primary dentition stage, occurs when only primary teeth are present. Once the first permanent tooth erupts into the mouth, the teeth that are present are in the mixed (or transitional) dentition stage. After the last primary tooth is shed or exfoliates out of the mouth, the teeth are in the permanent dentition stage. Each patient should be assigned a dentition period to allow for effective dental treatment.

=== Signs and symptoms of tooth eruption ===
There are several signs and symptoms associated with the eruption of primary teeth. It is a process that begins with the eruption of the mandibular central incisors at the age of 6 months. A common symptom among young children is a mild rise of temperature, however this is not necessarily classified as a fever. General symptoms during primary tooth eruption include; irritability and drooling being the most common, followed by a decreased appetite, sleeping problems, rhinorrhea, fever, diarrhea, rash and vomiting. Local signs include inflammation of the gums and gingival reddening (hyperemia), most commonly presenting in posterior teeth. A study shows that 70.5% of children between 0–36 months showed signs and symptoms of tooth eruption whether it being a fever, Gingival irrational and/or drooling.

=== Primary dentition stage ===
The primary dentition stage starts on the arrival of the mandibular central incisors, typically from around six months, and lasts until the first permanent molars appear in the mouth, usually at six years. There are 20 primary teeth and they typically erupt in the following order: (1) central incisor, (2) lateral incisor, (3) first molar, (4) canine, and (5) second molar. As a general rule, four teeth erupt for every six months of life, mandibular teeth erupt before maxillary teeth, and teeth erupt sooner in females than males. During primary dentition, the tooth buds of permanent teeth develop inferior to the primary teeth, close to the palate or tongue.

=== Mixed dentition stage ===
The mixed dentition stage starts when the first permanent tooth appears in the mouth, usually at five or six years with the first permanent molar, and lasts until the last primary tooth is lost, usually at ten, eleven, or twelve years. There are 32 permanent teeth and those of the maxillae (on the top) erupt in a different order from permanent mandibular (on the bottom) teeth. Maxillary teeth typically erupt in the following order: (1) first molar (2) central incisor, (3) lateral incisor, (4) first premolar, (5) second premolar, (6) canine, (7) second molar, and (8) third molar. Mandibular teeth typically erupt in the following order: (1) first molar (2) central incisor, (3) lateral incisor, (4) canine, (5) first premolar, (6) second premolar, (7) second molar, and (8) third molar. While this is the most common eruption order, variation is common.

Since there are no premolars in the primary dentition, the primary molars are replaced by permanent premolars. If any primary teeth are shed or lost before permanent teeth are ready to replace them, some posterior teeth may drift forward and cause space to be lost in the mouth. This may cause crowding and/or misplacement once the permanent teeth erupt, which is usually referred to as malocclusion. Orthodontics may be required in such circumstances for an individual to achieve a functioning and aesthetic dentition.

=== Permanent dentition stage ===
The permanent dentition stage begins when the last primary tooth is lost, usually at 11 to 12 years, and lasts for the rest of a person's life or until all of the teeth are lost (edentulism). After the permanent tooth forms in the bone, it will push through under the primary tooth. The adult tooth will dissolve the primary tooth's root, making the primary tooth loose until it falls out. During this stage, permanent third molars (also called "wisdom teeth") also erupt. These are sometimes extracted because of decay, pain or impactions. The main reasons for tooth loss are decay or periodontal disease.

== Active vs. Passive eruption ==
=== Active eruption ===
Active eruption is known as eruption of teeth into the mouth towards the occlusal plane. This is a natural path of eruption of all the teeth as they emerge from gingiva and continue erupting until they make contact with the opposing tooth.

=== Passive eruption ===
Passive eruption is known as movement of the gingiva apically or away from the crown of the tooth to the level of cementoenamel junction (CEJ) after the tooth has erupted completely. Problems in gingival tissue migrating apically can give rise to what is known as altered or delayed passive eruption. In this phenomenon, the gingival tissues fail to move apically and thus lead to shorter clinical crowns with more square-shaped teeth and appearance of what is known as gummy smile.

==== Coslet classification ====
Coslet et al. classified delayed passive eruption into two types which related the bone crest of a tooth to the mucogingival junction (MGJ) of that tooth. These two groups were further divided based on the position of the alveolar bone crest to the cementoenamel junction.

Type	Osseous crest level	Attached gingival level	Gingival margin level	Treatment
Type 1a	Apical to CEJ	Adequate	Incisal to CEJ	Gingivectomy
Type 1b	At CEJ	Adequate	Incisal to CEJ	Gingivectomy and osseous surgery
Type 2a	Apical to CEJ	Inadequate	Incisal to CEJ	Apically positioned flap
Type 2b	At CEJ	Inadequate	Incisal to CEJ	Apically positioned flap and osseous surgery

== Abnormalities ==
Abnormalities in tooth eruption (timing and sequence) are often caused by genetics and may result in malocclusion. In severe cases, such as in Down syndrome, the eruption may be delayed by several years and some teeth may never erupt.

=== Primary failure of eruption ===
Primary failure of eruption (PFE) is a rare disease in which tooth eruption does not occur despite space in the arch for eruption.

Non-eruption of non-ankylosed teeth occurs due to an eruption mechanism that has failed leading to a posterior unilateral/bilateral open bite. Infra occlusion is the primary hallmark of PFE. Primary teeth are most commonly affected and normally all teeth distal to the most mesially affected tooth will show characteristics of this disease. PFE can be treated by orthodontic treatment, however this is dependent on the patient's age, preference and clinical situation.

=== Cleidocranial Dysplasia ===
Cleidocranial dysplasia (CCD) is a disorder characterised by the identification of a heterozygous pathogenic variant in RUNX2 (CBFA1) and/or various clinical presentations and radiographs. There is a wide range of clinical presentations found in patients with CCD, including patients with a classical presentation of the disorder to patients who have isolated dental anomalies. These will often affect the mechanisms of tooth eruption and result in problems within primary and secondary dentition. Studies have shown that up to 94% of persons with CCD spectrum disorder have dental findings including supernumerary teeth and eruption failure of permanent teeth. The presence of a second permanent molar within primary dentition is the most common at 80% along with wide spacing in the lower incisor area, supernumerary tooth germs (705) and parallel-sided ascending rami. Individuals with a CCD spectrum disorder are also more likely to have an underbite and to have cysts in their gums that usually form around extra teeth.

Dental procedures can be carried out for the retention of deciduous teeth and non-eruption of permanent teeth. A combination of surgical and orthodontic work can also be considered for actively erupting teeth.

=== Cleft lip ===
Reports have noted that there is late tooth eruption in cleft lip patients when contrasted with non-cleft lip patients. The duration of delay is around 0.2 to 0.9 years, with an average of 0.56 years when all types of clefts were accounted for. The lateral incisor on the cleft side was typically the most delayed. The type of cleft and the severity of the condition did not affect the duration of tooth eruption. Overall, teeth which were located closer to the cleft lip took a longer time to erupt compared to teeth which were further away.

== See also ==
- Tooth development
- Orthodontics
- Deciduous teeth
- Permanent teeth
- Pre-eruption guidance
- Schultz's rule
- Failure of eruption of teeth
- Teething
- Dentition
