= Dental emergency =

Teeth surgery

A dental emergency is an issue involving the teeth and supporting tissues that are of high importance to be treated by the relevant professional. Dental emergencies do not always involve pain, although this is a common signal that something needs to be looked at. Pain can originate from the tooth, surrounding tissues or can have the sensation of originating in the teeth but be caused by an independent source (orofacial pain and toothache). Depending on the type of pain experienced, an experienced clinician can determine the likely cause and can treat the issue, as each tissue type gives different messages in a dental emergency.

Many emergencies exist and can range from bacterial, fungal, or viral infections to a fractured tooth or dental restoration, each requiring an individual response and treatment that is unique to the situation. Fractures (dental trauma) can occur anywhere on the tooth or to the surrounding bone; depending on the site and extent of the fracture, the treatment options will vary. Dental restoration falling out or fracturing can also be considered a dental emergency, as these can impact function in regard to aesthetics, eating, and pronunciation and as such should be tended to with the same haste as loss of tooth tissue. All dental emergencies should be treated under the supervision or guidance of a dental health professional in order to preserve the teeth for as long as possible.

By contrast, a medical emergency is often more precisely defined as an acute condition that presents an immediate threat to life, limb, vision, or long-term health. Consequently, dental emergencies can rarely be described as medical emergencies in these terms. Some define a dental emergency in terms of the individual's willingness to attend to emergency dental treatment at any time at short notice, stating that persons who are fussy about when they are available for treatment are not true emergency cases. There are often divergent opinions between clinicians and patients as to what constitutes a dental emergency. E.g., a person may suddenly lose a filling, crown, bridge, etc., and although they are completely pain-free, still have great cosmetic concerns about the appearance of their teeth and demand emergency treatment on the basis of perceived social disability.

== Dental Pain ==
Pain is described as 'an unpleasant sensory and emotional experience associated with actual or potential tissue damage, or described in terms of such damage. It is one of the most common reasons patients seek dental treatment and many diseases or conditions may be responsible for the cause.

=== Odontogenic pain ===
Odontogenic pain is pain associated with the teeth, originating in the dental pulp and/or the peri-radicular tissues. The following table shows the different classifications of pulp status.

Classification of pulp status	Features
Healthy pulp	Asymptomatic with mild and transient responses to various stimuli e.g. hot, cold pressure; Histologically no inflammation is present; Can include dentine hypersenitivity
Reversible pulpitis	Area of exposed dentine or pathway to exposed dentine; Stimulated by hot, cold, sweet, touch, biting; Mild sharp pain of short duration; “Sharp” “shooting” pain; Well-localised; No spontaneous or nocturnal pain; Histologically the pulp would show a superficial zone of inflammation
Irreversible pulpitis	Area of exposed dentine; Stimulated by hot, cold, sweet, touch, biting; Moderate to severe pain that lingers; Poorly localised; Spontaneous and nocturnal pain; Histologically the pulp is vital and exhibits an intense inflammatory response
Pulpal necrosis	Area of exposed dentine that has resulted in pulp exposure to the oral environment; Usually no true symptoms as the pulpal sensory nerves have been destroyed; Histologically the pulp is non-vital and usually is heavily infiltrated with bacteria
Pulp necrobiosis	Phenomenon that occurs in multirooted teeth where one part of the pulp is vital and irreversibly inflamed and the other parts are necrotic

==== Peri-radicular pain ====
Peri- radicular pain can be of pulpal origin, most commonly due to disease in the pulp extending into the peri-radicular tissues but can also be of periodontal origin due to periodontal disease. Apical periodontitis is acute inflammation of the periodontal ligament surrounding the tooth. This can be caused by inflammatory mediators from irreversibly inflamed pulp, bacterial toxins from necrotic pulp, restorations that have not been property contoured and in some cases, from treatments such as endodontic treatment. There is both an acute and chronic form of this condition. Acute apical periodontitis features include moderate to severe pain, usually stimulated by touch and pressure and may also include spontaneous pain. The chronic form of the condition can be asymptomatic but may also include pain from surrounding tissues when stimulated. Apical abscess is an extension of apical periodontitis where the bacteria have infiltrated the peri radicular tissues and are causing a severe inflammatory response; there is also an acute and chronic form of this condition. An acute apical abscess can cause facial swelling and can cause other systemic consequences such as a high temperature and feelings of malaise. In some cases this condition can be life-threatening when the inflammation compromises the airway; this is termed Ludwig's Angina. A chronic apical abscess can be asymptomatic as the pressure from the inflammation is being drained through a sinus tract; a draining sinus can usually be seen clinically. A periodontal abscess is a localised inflammation affecting the periodontal tissues. It is caused by bacteria pre-existing in a periodontal pockets, traumatic insertion of bacteria or foreign body or can occur after periodontal treatment. This condition has a rapid onset, is stimulated by touch and involves spontaneous pain. An apical abscess may drain through the periodontal pocket giving a false interpretation of periodontal abscess or a periodontal abscess may appear at the apex of the tooth giving a false interpretation of apical abscess; a tooth may also have both lesions at one point in time.

== Dental Trauma ==
Dental trauma refers to an injury to the hard and soft tissues of the oral cavity and face. This includes the teeth and surrounding tissues, the periodontium, the tongue, the lips, and the cheeks. It is more prevalent with children between 8–12 years of age but can still happen to anyone. Trauma to primary teeth most commonly occurs at the age of two to three years, during the period of developing motor coordination. When primary teeth are injured, treatment should primarily ensure the safety of the permanent tooth and avoid any risk of damage to the permanent successor teeth. This is because the apex of the root of the injured primary tooth lies close to the developing permanent tooth germ. The prognosis of the tooth is worse the longer it is out of the mouth.

The following is a list of dental trauma affecting different surfaces of the teeth and periodontium.

Do not touch the root surface. The root is covered with living periodontal ligament cells that are necessary for successful reimplantation. Even light contact can damage these cells and reduce your chances of saving the tooth.

=== Injuries to the hard dental tissues and the pulp ===
	Description	Clinical status	Treatment	Deciduous tooth
Enamel/ crown infraction	Incomplete crack limited to the enamel with no loss of tooth structure	Visible fracture or craze line/s, no tender to percussion, no mobility, positive to vitality testing, no radiographic abnormalities	No immediate treatment required and no follow-up needed if no associated dental injuries	No treatment required
Enamel fracture	Loss of tooth surface confined at the enamel	Loss of enamel, not TTP, no mobility, positive vitality testing	Smooth edges, restore tooth or attach tooth fragment if available. Dependent on the size of the fracture. Follow up radiograph in a year	Restore or smoothen tooth. Review 4–6 months until exfoliation
Crown and root fracture	Involves dentin and cementum but not necessarily pulp	TTP, mobile, positive vitality testing, pain on biting and sensitivity to air temperature. Apical extension of fracture is visible radiographically	There are a number of treatment options for crown and root fracture depending on the clinical findings. Initial treatment is to stabilise loose segments by cementing into place if fragment is still available. If it has been lost then a supragingival restoration is done. Monitor tooth 3, 6, 12 months to 2 years with radiographs	Extract tooth and monitor potential damage to permanent successor tooth
Root fracture	Fracture involving the cementum, dentin and pulp, with coronal portion of root displaced and apical portion of pulp remains vital	Coronal segment may be mobile and sometimes displaced, tender, vitality testing usually negative. Root fracture is visible radiographically appearing horizontally or diagonally planed	Splint to stabilise loose fragment for 4– 4 months depending location of fracture and then root canal treatment. Clinical and radiographic analysis after 8 weeks, 4, 6, 12 months and yearly for 5 years	Extract tooth and monitor for potential damage to permanent successor
Uncomplicated crown fracture	Fracture of the enamel with/ without dentin involvement, with no disturbance to the pulp	Visible loss of enamel and dentine, not TTP, normal mobility, positive to vitality testing	Tooth fragment is bonded on or restoration. Follow-up 6–8 weeks and 1 year	Smoothen sharp edges and/ or restore tooth. Review with radiographs after 6– 8 weeks. Monitor until exfoliation
Complicated crown fracture	Involves the enamel, dentin and pulp	Loss of enamel and dentine with exposure of pulp, no TTP, normal mobility, pulp sensitive to touch	Pulp capping, partial pulpotomy or coronal pulpotomy if root of tooth still forming or root canal treatment. Review and monitor every 3 months and then yearly	Extract tooth or pulp treatment if patient is cooperative. Monitor signs for symptoms and pathology

=== Injuries involving periodontal tissues ===
	Description	Clinical status	Treatment - permanent tooth	Deciduous tooth
Concussion	Injury to tooth supporting structures with no displacement of tooth	Visually no displacement of tooth, TTP, no mobility, usually a positive vitality test and no abnormalities radiographically	No immediate treatment required. Monitor pulpal condition for a year	Same treatment as permanent teeth
Sublaxation	Injury to tooth supporting structures with loosening of the tooth however with no displacement	Tender to percussion and increased mobility but no displacement of tooth as injury limited to the tooth supporting structures. Bleeding at gingival crevice	No immediate treatment required. Monitor pulpal condition for a year	Same treatment as permanent teeth
Extrusion	Loosening and partial displacement of the tooth out of its socket. Alveolar bone is still intact however may result in a partial or total separation of periodontal ligament	Tooth appears elongated, TTP, excessively mobile, vitality testing inconclusive	Reposition tooth back into tooth socket after surface has been cleaned with saline. Splint is applied and to be monitored after two weeks for further treatment. Root canal treatment where signs of pulpal necrosis	Extract tooth. If minimal extrusion then leave and monitor
Lateral Luxation	Displacement of tooth in a lateral position – labially, lingually, distally or mesially. Most seen case is crown towards the palate with the apex going labially. Sensitivity to touch is present as well as sulcular bleeding	Tooth displaced usually at a palatal/ lingual or labial direction, sensitive to touch, sulcular bleeding, tooth locked into bone. Radiographically the tooth shows a widened periodontal ligament space	Tooth is repositioned into its original location and is splinted for 4 weeks	If crown displaced towards the palate and is not in traumatic occlusion then no treatment is required as apex of the tooth is away from the developing tooth germ. If apex of tooth is displaced towards the palate and making contact with the tooth germ then tooth is extracted
Intrusive Luxation	Displacement of tooth into the alveolar bone (pushed into the socket) causing fracture of the alveolar bone. It is the most damaging injury to the tooth and supporting tissues as ankylosis and pulp necrosis can occur. In severe cases, 100% of the crown is not visible	Tooth displaced axially into alveolar bone, no mobility, negative to vitality testing. Periodontal ligament space may be absent radiographically	Depending on severity of displacement, tooth may be left to allow for spontaneous eruption. If severe then orthodontic reposition or surgical repositioning is needed. Root canal treatment after 12 weeks	Tooth is extracted if apex of the root is in the developing tooth bud
Avulsion	Tooth is completely displaced out of the socket. Desiccation of periodontal ligament can not occur, as well as pulpal necrosis if no immediate action is taken place	Tooth is absent from socket	Depends on the maturity of the tooth, how the tooth was stored and patient cooperation. If tooth has been kept in favourable conditions and periodontal ligament is not necrotic, then tooth is replanted	Tooth is not replanted to avoid damage to developing tooth germ

Dental barotrauma and barodontalgia. A sudden incapacitation of diver or aviator due to barometric-induced tooth fracture or toothache, respectively, may be life-threatening to the individual and the airplane passengers.

Regular use of a protective mouthguard during sports and other high-risk activities (for example, military training) is the most effective prevention of dental injuries.

== Restorative emergencies ==
=== Lost or broken filling ===
A fractured, ditched, or dislodged filling that is broken or lost may cause discomfort or sharp pain due to jagged edges. There can be aesthetic concerns if the filling is in a visible area. Patients need to be aware of the sharp edges and ensure their tongue does not constantly apply pressure around that area, as it can cause cuts to the tongue. However, in some cases the result of the loss of a filling can cause irritation to the side of the cheek and potentially lead to an ulcer. Sharp edges can easily be dealt with by leveling the filling or tooth edges from your local dentist during the emergency appointment. Hypersensitivity issues may also arise, short, sharp pain caused by exposed underlying dentine, after the deterioration of the filling material.

Reasons for the deterioration of a restoration vary in different cases; the cause may be underlying caries, or it could be occlusal trauma, caused by natural dentition during mastication. The longevity of restorative materials could also be a factor; the survival rates of amalgam are usually 10–15 years, composite 7 years, while gold and ceramic fillings have over a 20-year longevity.

During the emergency appointment the dentist will need to take a set of radiographs to assess for any underlying caries, bone loss, or possible abscess. The clinical examination will detect the reasons behind the failure of the restoration. Upon treatment, the dentist will provide options on the tooth's prognosis, these may include a new restoration, extraction, root canal, or placement of a crown. The tooth prognosis includes the tooth's vitality and restorability.

- Crack, fracture and mobility

A crack, fracture and the mobility of a tooth are all interrelated as the pain and symptoms experienced from a tooth that has been cracked are very similar to that of a tooth that has been fractured. A tooth crack is defined as an incomplete fracture of enamel or dentine and therefore is not usually associated with noticeable mobility. The cause of a tooth crack can be by excessive force applied to a healthy tooth or physiologic forces applied to a weakened tooth. The teeth most commonly involved are usually the lower molars, followed by the upper premolars and molars. The condition is extremely common in the age range of 30–60 years.

A diagnosis of a cracked tooth is extremely difficult. A careful history and assessment of the symptoms presented need to be taken into account; radiographs and certain tests will be conducted in the dental office. The most common symptoms are cold sensitivity, sharp pain when using force to chew; this pain results from the release of pressure and are very important indicators of a cracked tooth. However, the symptoms may differ among various patients, subject to the depth and orientation of the crack.

=== Broken crown ===
Crowns can become broken by a fracture, non-retentive preparation, secondary caries, weak cement, excessive occlusal forces, decementation, or loosening of the crown. The consequences of a crown becoming loose include the risk of ingestion and less likely, inhalation. The management of the loose crown includes immediate recementation or a replacement crown, depending on the assessment conducted by the dentist.

The factors that are taken into consideration in making this decision include the strength of the temporary crown to be placed and occlusal forces. Thus, a thorough occlusal examination is of paramount importance; for the strength of the cement, a strong alternative of cement should be considered. The occlusion assessment should also include the static and functional occlusion as well as the possible presence of parafunctional habits, such as clenching or bruxism.

Management includes cleaning all the cement and residues, to carefully inspect for any underlying caries or fractures. Details that need to be assessed include margins, gingivae, and contact points; occlusion needs to be checked in both ICP and in lateral and protrusive excursions, before the crown can be re-cemented. Stronger cement should be used than the original, such as resin cements, especially in cases of heavy occlusal forces.

In some cases, immediate reconstruction of the abutment may be deemed inappropriate; if the underlying structure is deemed deficient due to caries or a fracture, then this issue needs to be addressed. The treatment plan may vary with the addition of a root canal treatment or a temporary crown for the reconstruction of a new crown.

- Fracture of a porcelain veneer or a porcelain-fused-to-metal crown

Immediate management includes a chair side repair of the fractured veneer with composite material. Bonding composite to the exposed metal will involve achieving macro-mechanical retention by making grooves and notches or abrading the surface. Bonding material back onto exposed porcelain involves abrading, hydrofluoric acid etching, and silanating, followed by a conventional bonding procedure. A composite patch will remain a temporary solution, as the longevity of composite restorations is not predictable as well as the colour of composite is not as stable as porcelain for aesthetic reasons.

=== Broken denture ===
A fracture can involve any damage to the denture. Any type of repair to the denture is much less ideal than making a new one. The ratio of fracture to denture is a 1:3 ratio of the upper to lower.

The most common reason for fracture in a denture is accidental dropping of the denture in the case of the lower denture and improper fitting and stability of the denture in the upper denture.

- Techniques to prevent dentures from being broken:
1. Use a basin of water in the sink to help prevent the denture from breaking if it happens to fall on a hard surface.
2. Hold the denture in the non-dominant hand with a firm but gentle grasp.
3. Do not use any powdered or abrasive cleaners, including most regular toothpastes; they are too abrasive and produce scratches on the denture's surface.
4. Avoid excessive scrubbing, as this can damage the denture.
5. Dry the denture and place it in a plastic container stored somewhere safe overnight.

Individuals should not continue to wear a broken denture and should seek the help of their dentist as soon as possible.

=== Broken or loose implants ===
Implant success is relatively high, the rate of implant survival is between 85 and 95%, although it is not uncommon for emergency management of a failing implant or one of its components. The failure is most likely due to infection of the implant. It is highly recommended to visit or refer patient to the specialist who provided the implant.

Late failures that occur with implants are usually due to moderate to severe bone loss, mostly located in the posterior areas of teeth and involve a multi-unit prosthesis. A fracture or decementation of a post or loosening of the abutment screw of an implant could be the result of dissolved cement, secondary caries, use of a weak post, or excessive occlusal forces. Oral home care needs to remain at a high standard, brushing twice a day for the duration of two minutes with the use of fluoridated tooth paste. Interdental cleaning once a day using either floss, interdental brushes, wood sticks. Regular dental appointments every 6 months to maintain gingival health, professional cleans, radiographs to examine the bone loss and the implant status. All the following is needed to prolong the longevity of the implant and reduce the risk of peri-implantitis.

== Acute oral medical and surgical conditions ==
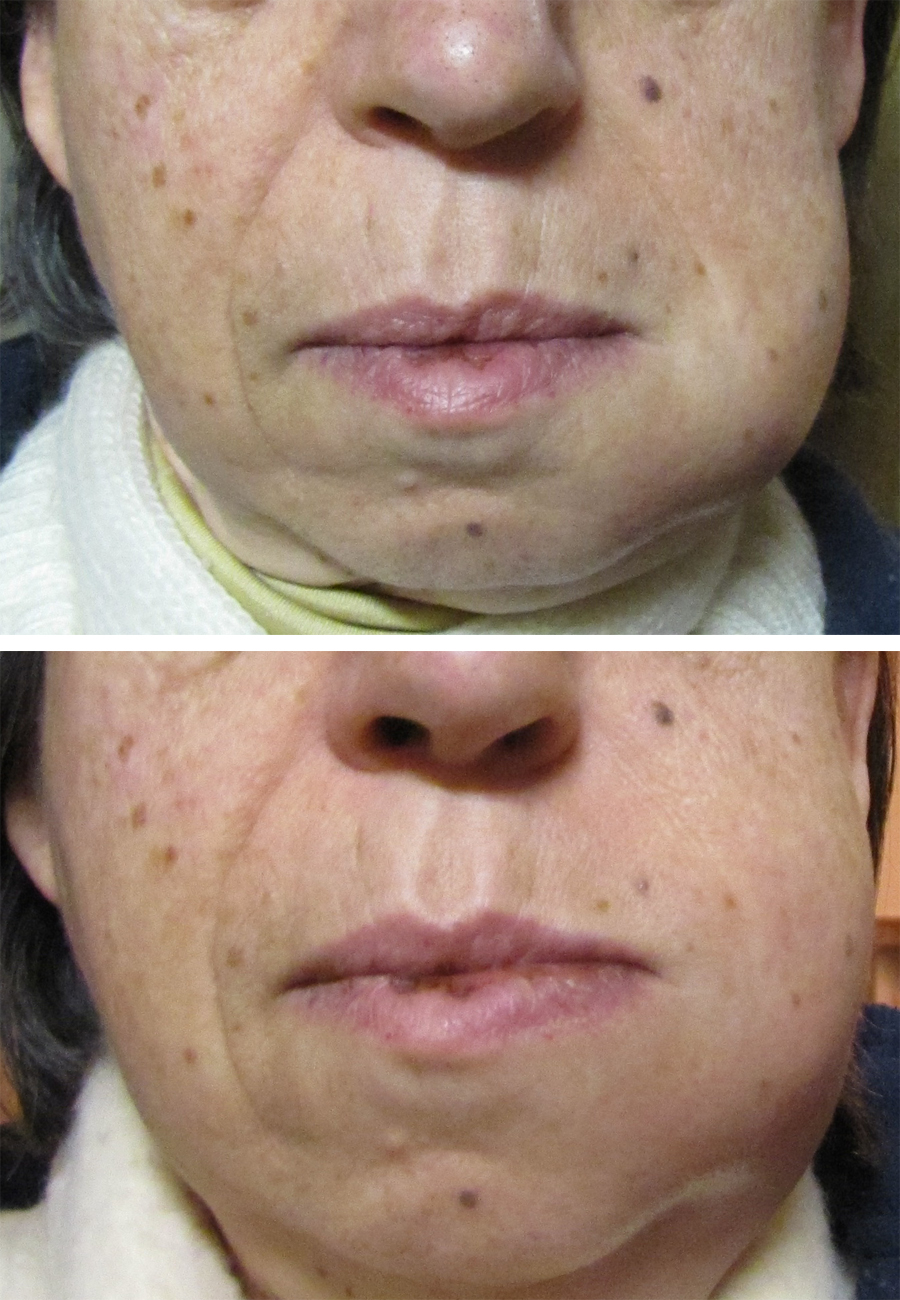
An abscess originating from a tooth which has spread to involve the buccal space. Above, deformation of the cheek on the second day. Below, deformation on the third day.

An acute condition may be defined as a suddenly presenting disorder, usually with only a short history of symptoms, but with a degree of severity that causes significant disruption to the patient.

Types of acute conditions

=== Orofacial swelling ===
A swelling is a transient abnormal enlargement of a body part or area not caused by proliferation of cells but by accumulation of fluid in tissues. It can occur throughout the body (generalized), or a specific part or organ can be affected (localized). A swelling may arise intra-orally or externally around the face, jaws, and neck and can be caused by trauma (hematoma, swelling due to fracture, TMJ dislocation), infection, or inflammation. Swelling can occur in the gums, palate, lips, buccal space, etc. It can happen due to periodontal problems, infection, abscess, cysts, allergic reactions (anaphylactic shock), salivary gland tumors, inflammation, or obstruction of the salivary gland.

=== Cellulitis ===
Bacterial infection in the oro-facial region can lead to abscess and swelling. The rapid spread of this infection through connective tissue spaces, is often referred to as cellulitis. The clinical features of cellulitis are a painful, diffuse, brawny swelling. The overlying skin is red, tense, and shiny. There is usually an associated trismus, cervical lymphadenopathy, malaise, and pyrexia. Cellulitis usually develops quickly, over the course of hours, and may follow an inadequately managed or ignored local dental infection. If the infection spreads to involve the floor of the mouth and pharyngeal spaces, then the airway can be compromised. Initially, the floor of the mouth will be raised, and the patient will have difficulty in swallowing saliva; this pools and may be observed running from the patient's mouth. This sign indicates the need for urgent management. Cellulitis involving the tissue spaces on both sides of the floor of the mouth is described as Ludwig's angina Such presentations require immediate attention.

Localised dental abscesses may be appropriately treated by intra-oral drainage via tooth extraction, opening of root canals and/or intra-oral incision and drainage. Wherever there are signs of spreading cervico-facial infection or significant systemic disturbance, however, patients should be referred urgently for further management.

=== Pericoronitis ===
Pericoronitis is defined as inflammation in the soft tissues surrounding the crown of a partially erupted tooth. The acute form is characterised by severe pain, often referred to adjacent areas, causing loss of sleep, swelling of the pericoronal tissues, discharge of pus, trismus, regional lymphadenopathy, pain on swallowing, pyrexia, and in some cases spread of the infection to adjacent tissue spaces.

- Blistering disorders of oral mucosa (see vesiculobullous disease)
- oral ulceration
- Disturbed orofacial sensory or motor function

=== Trismus ===
Trismus may be defined as inability to open the mouth due to muscle spasm, but the term is frequently used for limited movement of the jaw from any cause and usually refers to temporary limitation of movement. Trismus can occur as a result of temporomandibular joint disorder, infection, cancer therapy, complicated extraction, arthritis, complication from a mandibular block and fractures.

=== Hemorrhage ===
Whilst haemorrhage from the oro-facial region may present spontaneously, particularly from gingival tissue as a result of a bleeding diathesis or a haematological abnormality such as leukaemia, the most common cause is in response to trauma or a post-operative haemorrhage following dental extraction.

=== Bony pathology, e.g. Infection of an odontogenic cyst ===
Cysts can be common lesions found in the jaw. They are defined as cavities filled with fluid or semi-fluid content, created from the resorption of bone. They can wholly or partly be lined by epithelium and connective tissue. They are not to be confused with abscesses, which are cavities filled with pus. Cysts can cause root resorption of adjacent teeth, tooth mobility and can be associated with mandibular fracture. Cyst would usually require surgical management if indicated.

=== Post-extraction pain and infection, or dry socket ===
Following a tooth extraction, if a blood clot forms inadequately in the socket or it is broken down, a painful infection may develop which is often referred to as a ‘dry socket’. It is clinically characterized by a putrid odor and intense pain that radiates to the ear and neck. Pain is considered the most important symptom of dry socket. It can vary in frequency and intensity, and other symptoms, such as headache, insomnia, and dizziness, can be present. Pre-disposing factors to dry socket include smoking, traumatic extraction, history of radiotherapy and bisphosphonate medication. A dry socket can be managed by irrigating the socket with chlorhexidine or warmed saline to remove debris followed by dressing of the socket with bismuth iodoform paraffin paste and lidocaine gel on ribbon gauze to protect the socket from painful stimuli. If pus is seen in the socket and there is localised swelling and possibly lymphadenopathy, it has become infected and can often be managed as in dry socket, but usually antibiotics should be prescribed. A radiograph is useful to see if there is a retained root or bony sequestrum, which could be the cause of the infection. Clearly, if one or both is present, further treatment is indicated.

=== Postoperative swelling ===
Mild inflammatory swelling may follow dental extractions but is unusual unless the procedure was difficult and significant surgical trauma occurred. More significant swelling usually indicates postoperative infection or presence of a haematoma. Management of infection may require systemic antibiotics or drainage. A large haematoma may need to be drained.

== Orthodontic emergencies ==
Orthodontic emergencies can be classified as urgent problems relating to the maintenance of orthodontic appliances, or excessive pain caused by orthodontic appliances. General dental practitioners should be able to manage orthodontic emergencies, including referral to an orthodontist when necessary.

=== Loose removable appliance ===
Removable active appliance are used by dentist to tip teeth using screws, springs and bows of various types to correct malocclusion. The appliance can be taken out for cleaning and for adjustments made by orthodontists. If the appliance is loose in an emergency situation, the dentist can adjust the retentive component of the appliance to increase the retention of the appliance by using Adams pliers.

=== Fractured removable appliance ===
Suppose the appliance breaks, the orthodontist should be alerted as soon as possible. The wearer should not use the appliance as it could cause trauma and could pose a significant risk of airway obstruction if the wearer accidentally inhales.

=== Loose or fractured fixed appliance (wire or band) ===
There are many components to the fixed appliance which have a potential to break off if the patient chews on hard or crunchy food. Wearers should wear a mouth guard over the appliance if when playing contact sports. If one of the components is loose or comes off, the user must call the orthodontist right away. If the component is loose the dentist as an emergency treatment can cover the component with orthodontic relief wax. If the component breaks off, then the dentist can use a pair of tweezers to remove it making sure to protect the airway at all times.

=== Loose or Lost Ligature ===
Ligatures are small elastics or wires which aim to secure the archwire firmly within the brackets on the teeth. If a ligature becomes loose or lost, this can render the appliance less effective as the forces on that particular tooth are reduced. In this case, a loose elastic can be re-positioned with tweezers, ideally by an orthodontist however general dental practitioners are also able to do so. If a wire ligature becomes loose, it should be secured or replaced only by a trained orthodontist and in the meantime, if causing irritation, orthodontic relief wax should be used over any sharp ends. The patient should avoid replacing the wire ligature themselves if it is lost and should seek an appointment with their orthodontist.

=== Lost separator/spacer ===
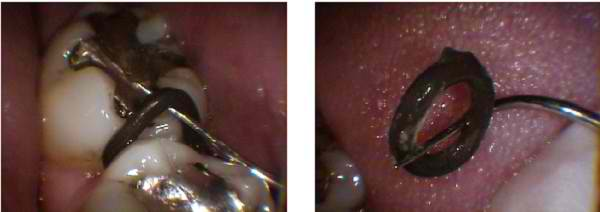
Separator found between posterior teeth

Separators, also known as orthodontic spacers, are usually placed between posterior teeth to open up contact point prior to placing metal orthodontic bands. The separators should ideally be kept in place until the patient's next appointment in order for the orthodontic band to fit. If the separator is lost, the orthodontist should be informed and he/she can advise for a next appointment for the patient.

=== Protruding archwires ===
The archwire in fixed orthodontic appliances should be flat against the tooth, however if the wire is protruding it can cause irritation to the surrounding soft tissues. Wire benders or a dental flat plastic can be used to bend the wire into place, or if this is not possible, the protruding wire can be covered with wax. If there are significant problems, the wire can be clipped using distal end cutters, being careful to avoid inhaling or ingesting wire fragments. As a last resort measure, the whole wire and ligatures can be removed.

=== De-bonded bracket ===
De-bonded brackets, if left untreated, can result in irritation of lip and cheek in short term. If a bracket de-bonds from the tooth, the de-bonded bracket can be removed from the archwire by initially removing the ligature holding it in place. Alternatively, orthodontic wax relief can be used to secure the de-bonded bracket to the adjacent bracket as a temporary measure to prevent irritation of lip and cheek. However, it is essential to inform the orthodontist as soon as possible so that appropriate actions are taken to address the de-bonded brackets immediately.

=== Allergic/hypersensitivity reactions ===
The most common allergy in orthodontics is to nickel. Nickel is found in multiple orthodontic components, such as nickel-titanium (NiTi) archwires and stainless steel brackets. If patients are previously exposed to nickel, for example with nickel-containing jewellery, the re-exposure with orthodontic components are more likely to lead to a Type IV delayed hypersensitivity immune response. This response is usually delayed for a few days or weeks. In this case, the orthodontist must be informed immediately to make arrangements for patient to receive nickel-free components. However, such immune response to nickel is rare, as it is believed that the oral mucosa requires a much higher concentration to illicit a response compared to the skin.

=== Airway obstruction ===
When a small removable appliance or a loose component obstructs a patient's airway a true medical emergency arises. If the object is visible, recline the patient and attempt to remove it while otherwise encouraging the patient to cough the object out. If this is not immediately successful call for help and an ambulance. Follow the guidelines for 'choking/aspiration' in the 'Medical Emergencies and Resuscitation' document provided by the Resuscitation Council UK.

=== Ingested or aspirated component ===
It is not unheard of to ingest an orthodontic component or appliance, usually being asymptomatic causing no harm to the patient. No treatment is required except for monitoring stools to ensure the component has passed safely. If however the patient is having symptoms of pain or vomiting, the component may be lodged in the oesophagus or oropharynx. In such situations the patient must be sent to hospital.

If the component is more than 5 cm long the patient should always be sent to A&E as there is a higher risk of obstruction or perforation of the gastrointestinal tract so removal may be advised instead of allowing the component to pass naturally. When sending a patient to hospital the referral letter must contain details regarding the components size, shape, flexibility, radio-opacity as well as information about the incident for example when it was swallowed.

Aspiration of an orthodontic component which was unable to be removed must be referred to A&E for chest radiographs and subsequent removal of the component. The referral letter again must include details as described above.

== Treatments ==
The treatment is cause-related. For example, oil of cloves, which contains eugenol, can be used to treat dental pain; a drop can be applied with a cotton swab as a palliative . After wisdom tooth extraction, for example, a condition known as dry socket can develop where nerve endings are exposed to air. A piece of sterile gauze or cotton soaked in oil of cloves may be placed in the socket after careful cleaning with saline to relieve this form of pain .

Over-the-counter topical anesthetics containing active ingredients such as benzocaine or choline salicylate may be applied directly to the gum in order to deaden sensation.

Analgesics such as aspirin, paracetamol (acetaminophen) and ibuprofen are also commonly used; aspirin and ibuprofen have the additional benefits of being anti-inflammatories. Ice and/or heat are also frequently applied . A dentist may prescribe an anti-inflammatory corticosteroid such as Dexameth for pain relief prior to treatment.
