= Permanent teeth =

Second set of teeth in diphyodont mammals

Adult teeth
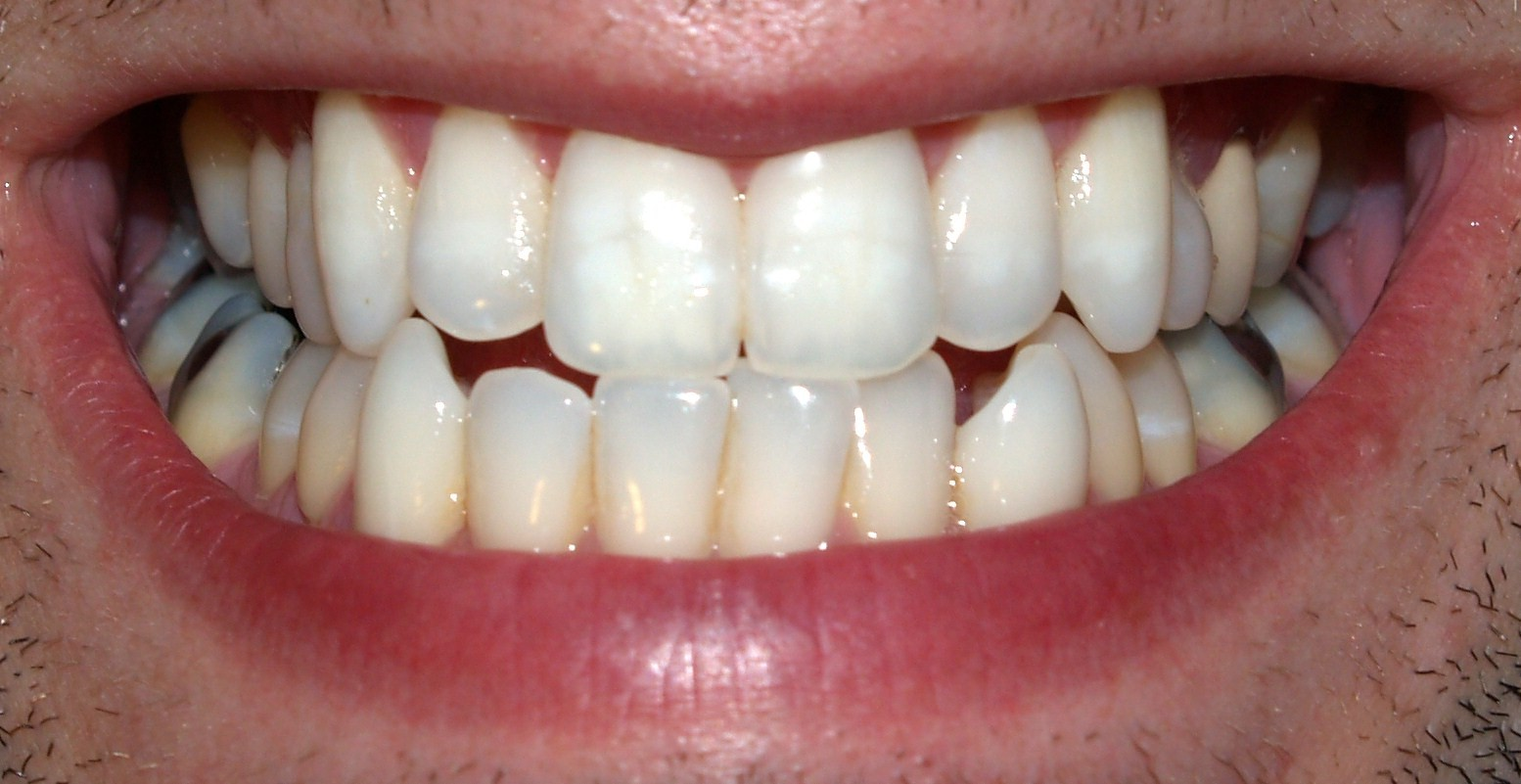
- Adult mouth showing full set of permanent teeth

Details

Identifiers
- Latin: dentes permanentes
- TA98: A05.1.03.077
- TA2: 913
- FMA: 75152

Permanent teeth or adult teeth are the second set of teeth formed in diphyodont mammals. In humans and old world simians, there are thirty-two permanent teeth, consisting of six maxillary and six mandibular molars, four maxillary and four mandibular premolars, two maxillary and two mandibular canines, four maxillary and four mandibular incisors.

== Timeline ==
The first permanent tooth usually appears in the mouth at around 5-6 years of age, and the mouth will then be in a transition time with both primary (or deciduous dentition) teeth and permanent teeth during the mixed dentition period until the last primary tooth is lost or shed.

The first of the permanent teeth to erupt are the permanent first molars, right behind the last 'milk' molars of the primary dentition. These first permanent molars are important for the correct development of a permanent dentition. Up to thirteen years of age, 28 of the 32 permanent teeth will appear.

The full permanent dentition is completed much later during the permanent dentition period. The four last permanent teeth, the third molars, usually appear between the ages of 17 and 21 years; they are considered wisdom teeth.

== Pathology ==
It is possible to have extra, or "supernumerary", teeth. This phenomenon is called hyperdontia and is often erroneously referred to as "a third set of teeth." These teeth may erupt into the mouth or remain impacted in the bone. Hyperdontia is often associated with syndromes such as cleft lip and cleft palate, tricho-rhino-phalangeal syndrome, cleidocranial dysplasia, and Gardner's syndrome.

== See also ==
- Animal tooth development – Process by which teeth form and grow into the mouth
- Deciduous dentition – First set of teeth in diphyodonts
- Dentition – Development and arrangement of teeth
- Teething – Infants gaining their first teeth
- Tooth eruption – Process in tooth development
