= Montague Phillips (chemist) =

British chemist (1902–1972)

Montague Alexander Phillips FRIC, MICHemE, CEng, FRSM, FCS
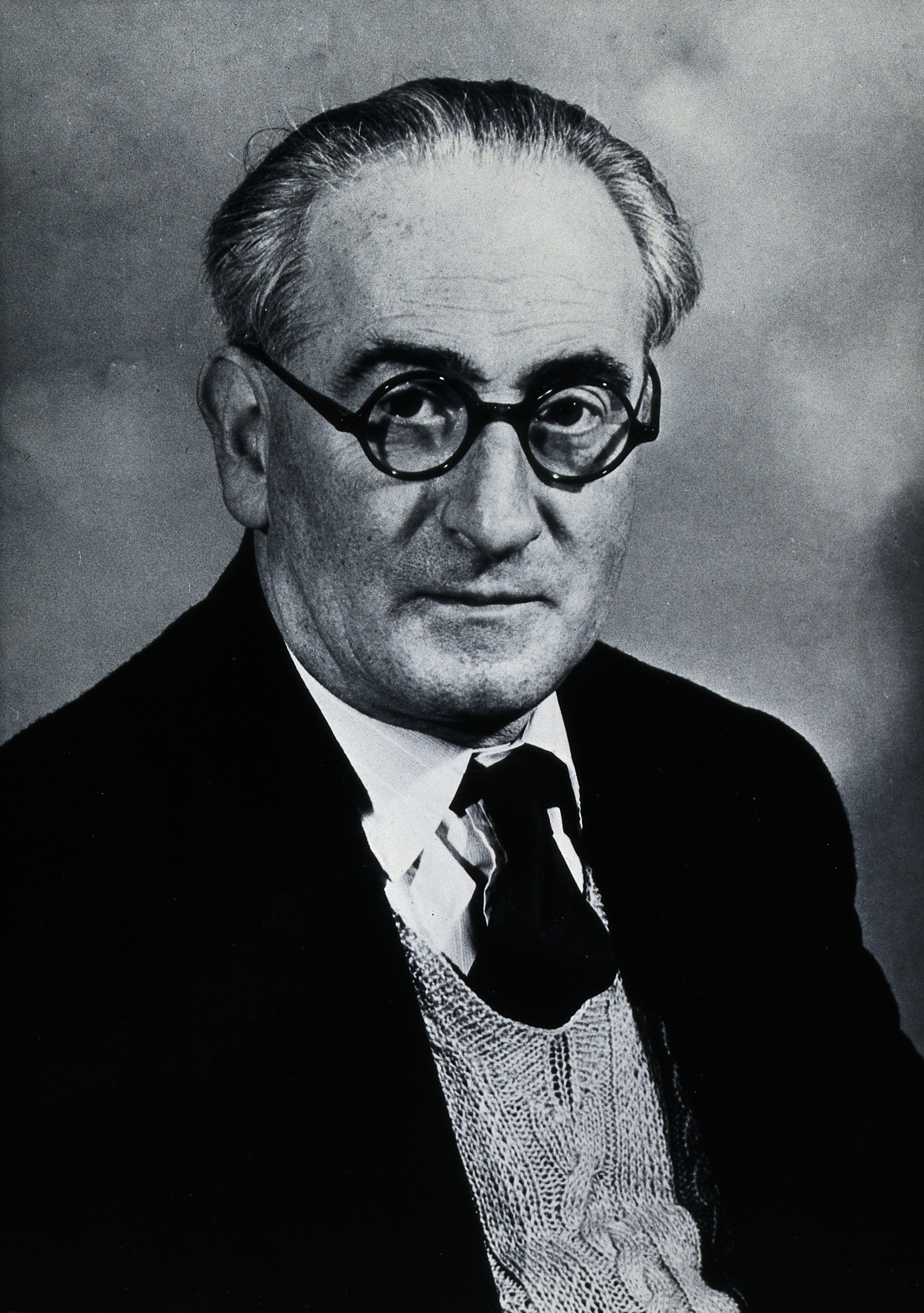
- Montague Phillips in c.1954
- Born: 1 December 1902; South London, UK
- Died: 12 October 1972 (aged 69); Upminster, Essex, UK
- Siglum: MaP
- Education: Battersea Polytechnic (BSc 1926); London University (DSc 1942)
- Known for: Synthesis of sulphapyridine (1937); Thalidomide whistleblower (1967)
- Scientific career
- Fields: Chemistry; Industrial Chemistry; Chemical Engineering
- Workplaces: May & Baker, Dagenham, UK

Montague Alexander Phillips (1 December 1902 - 12 October 1972) was an English industrial chemist and chemical engineer.

He is notable for synthesising the drug Sulphapyridine in 1937, while working as a research chemist at May & Baker, Dagenham, Essex. Sulphapyridine (also known as sulfapyridine, T693, M&B 693 and Dagenan) was an early antimicrobial and antibiotic, and the first effective treatment for pneumonia, meningitis and various other bacterial infections of humans and animals. As such, it saved tens of thousands of lives globally in the years before penicillin and other antibiotics became generally available.

In the 1960s, Phillips was a key whistleblower in the thalidomide scandal.

== Personal life ==
Phillips married Helena May Matilda Holland (1902–1980) in June 1927 in Lewisham, London. They had one child.

== Education and qualifications ==
Phillips attended the John Roan School, Greenwich. At 18 he joined May & Baker, Battersea as a laboratory assistant while taking evening classes at Battersea Polytechnic. He graduated with a Bachelor of Science (BSc) degree in Chemistry in 1926. In 1942 he was awarded a Doctor of Science (DSc) degree by London University.

Phillips was a Fellow of the Royal Institute of Chemistry (FRIC), Chartered Member of the Institution of Chemical Engineers (MICHemE), Chartered Chemical Engineer, Chartered Engineer (CEng), Fellow of the Royal Society of Medicine (FRSM) and Fellow of the Chemical Society (FCS).

== Synthesis of sulphapyridine ==
In 1935 IG Farben introduced the prodrug Prontosil as an antibacterial treatment for streptococci infections. Later that year, a team working in the laboratory of Ernest Fourneau at the Pasteur Institute in Paris determined that sulphanilamide was the active form of Prontosil. These were the first of the so-called sulpha drugs, which represented a revolution in the treatment of infectious diseases through drug therapy. Within months, a number of other pharmaceutical companies began efforts to develop their own antimicrobials.

In early 1936 the UK chemical company May & Baker commenced an extensive search for new sulphanilamide derivatives with useful antimicrobial properties. This project was initiated by director of research Arthur Ewins and carried out by chemists George Newberry and Montague Phillips. Since May & Baker lacked suitable facilities, animal testing was conducted through collaboration with Lionel Whitby, then a clinical pathologist at the Bland-Sutton Institute of Pathology, Middlesex Hospital in London. Between May 1936 and November 1937 around 64 different sulphanilamide compounds were synthesised and evaluated.

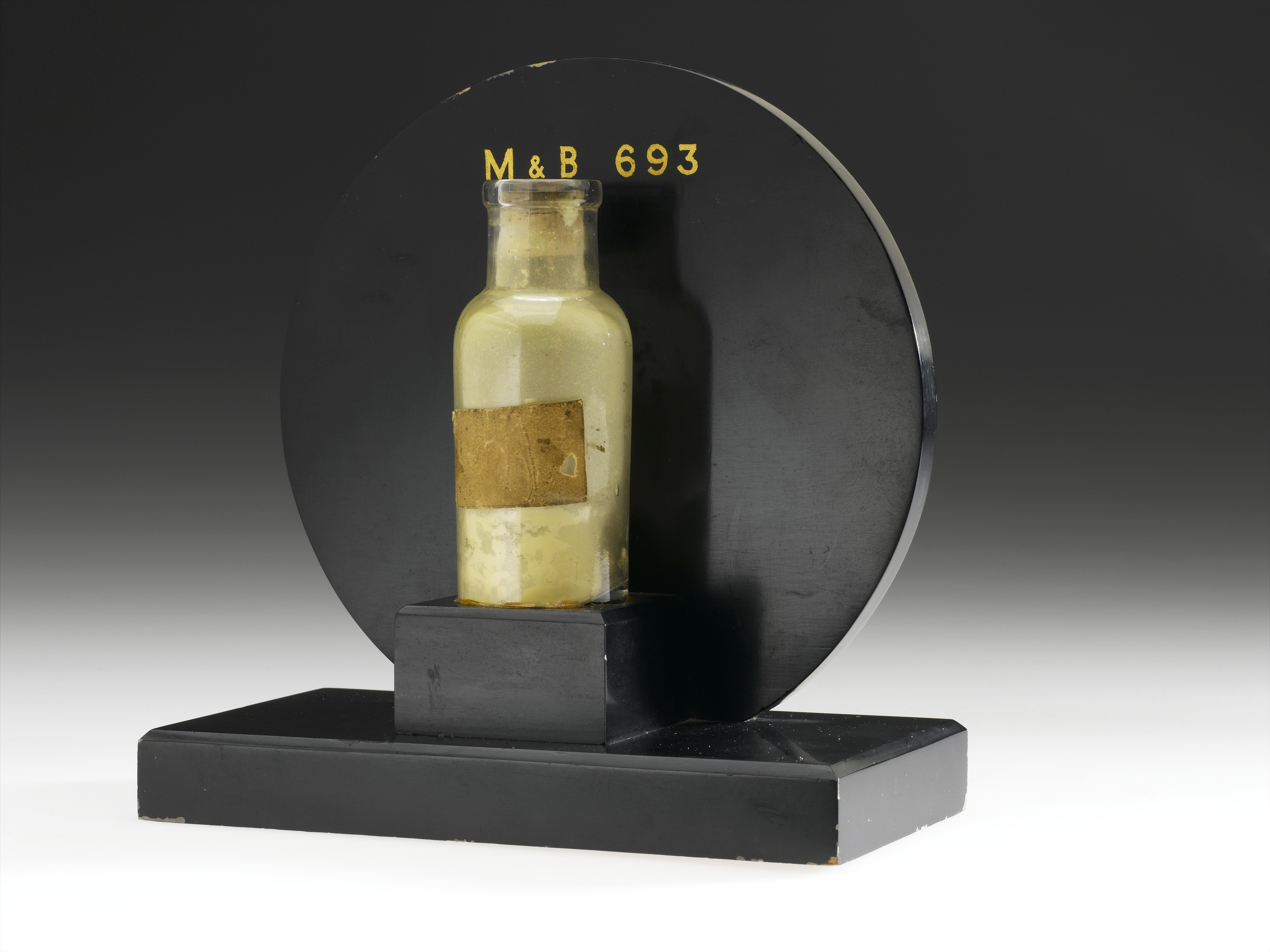
First sample of M&B 693 (Wellcome Collection)

The synthesis of sulphapyridine was not planned but rather it was produced opportunistically due to the availability of aminopyridine, a chemical precursor. The first sample of sulphapyridine was created by Phillips on 2 November 1937. The sample weighed 10 grammes and was initially recorded in the May & Baker laboratory test log as T693. The log entry was also initialed by Phillips. The final synthesis step involved the removal of an acetyl group and was not straightforward. The standard technique, using hydrochloric acid, did not work in this particular case. Instead, Phillips devised a counter-intuitive approach using sodium hydroxide. A few grammes of the first sulphapyridine sample were delivered to Whitby for animal testing with the designation M&B 693.

Sulphapyridine proved effective against pneumococcal, streptococcal, meningococcal, staphylococcal, and gonococcal infections in mice. In December 1937 Richard Wien, a researcher at the British Pharmacological Society in London undertook oxicology testing with positive results. Several scientists at May & Baker were the first humans to consume the drug and reported no ill effects. In March 1938 sulphapyridine was tested on a single hospital patient with advanced pneumonia who subsequently recovered.

Clinical trials were carried out by Gladys Mary Evans and Wilfrid Fletcher Gaisford, physicians at Dudley Road Hospital in Birmingham. Between March and June 1938, 100 patients with lobar pneumonia were treated with sulphapyridine with a mortality rate of 8% versus 27% in the equal sized control group.

May & Baker industrialised production of the drug and began marketing sulphapyridine in October 1938 under the trade name Dagenan. Sulphapyridine became more commonly known as M&B 693 or more simply M&B in most countries, apart from the United States and Canada. It was also introduced and widely used in veterinary medicine.

The effectiveness of sulphapyridine, particularly against pneumonia, attracted considerable newspaper attention and M&B 693 quickly became a household name around the world. At the end of 1938 a license was granted for Merck to manufacture and distribute sulphapyridine in the USA. Patents for sulphapyridine were issued in the UK in 1939 and the US in 1941 with Ewins and Phillips named as co-inventors. Ewins and Phillips were recommended for a Nobel Prize by Calcutta University in 1942.

M&B 693 played an important role during World War II in many Allied countries. It was widely used, sometimes prophylactically and routinely issued to military personnel as tablets. Sulphapyridine was also found to be effective as a topical antimicrobial in powdered form. M&B 693 was famously used to treat Winston Churchill for pneumonia on two occasions. Churchill expressed his thanks to Phillips with a signed photograph.

By 1943 sulphapyridine was estimated to be saving 25,000 civilian lives per year in the USA and a similar number of lives in the UK. A 2009 study by the National Bureau of Economic Research concluded that between 1937 and 1943 sulpha drugs reduced the mortality rate in the US by 2 to 4 percent and increased life expectancy by 0.4 to 0.8 years. During this period, sulphapyridine was responsible for the majority of this trend.

The development of other sulpha drugs and the mass production of penicillin after World War II led to a decline in the use of sulphapyridine. However, it remained in use in the US for treating people with Duhring's disease until 1990. As of 2025, sulphapyridine is still used in the UK in veterinary medicine for the treatment of mastitis in cattle.

== Later life ==
Phillips left May & Baker in 1947 after 20 years service and having attained the position of assistant chief chemist. He took with him the original T693 sample bottle and later donated it to the Wellcome Collection, London. Phillips worked as an independent chemical consultant until his death in 1972. He campaigned against excessive profit margins on pharmaceuticals.

Throughout his career Phillips published a large number of scientific papers relating to chemistry and chemical engineering. He was named on several patents, both while employed at May & Baker and later while acting as an independent consultant.

Phillips served in the Air Raid Precautions reserve between 1939–45 and received the Civil Defence Medal. He was elected as a councillor in the Essex Administrative County in the 1950s and 1960s. During the same period he served as a Technical Reconnaissance Officer in the Civil Defence Corps. In that capacity, he was interviewed on ITN television news in April 1963 about the Spies for Peace revelations concerning RSG-6.

Phillips received some recognition for his role in the creation of sulphapyridine during his lifetime. However, his involvement was often minimised or entirely overlooked. He received no honours or awards for his work.

== Thalidomide whistleblower ==
In the 1960s Phillips was retained as a professional advisor by Kimber Bull & Co, the solicitors representing the families against Distillers during the thalidomide lawsuits. His wife had previously developed irreversible polyneuritis (nerve damage) from the use of thalidomide as a sleeping pill. During this period Phillips passed 10,000 Distillers documents that were obtained through legal discovery to The Sunday Times as part of their long-running investigation into the thalidomide scandal.
