= Germaine Benoit =

French chemical engineer (1901–1983)

- Born: 9 October 1901; Paris
- Died: April 1983 (aged 81); Paris
- Known for: Study of sympathomimetic drugs
- Scientific career
- Fields: Chemical engineering, pharmacology and biology

Germaine Benoit (9 October 1901 – April 1983) was a French chemical engineer, pharmacologist and biologist, best known for her contributions to the study of sympathomimetic drugs.

== Early life ==
Benoit was born on 9 October 1901 in Paris. She was an only child, and lost her father, a German teacher, in her teens, as he disappeared during the First World War. (Note: Archives de l'Institut Pasteur.)

== Education ==
In 1918 and 1919, she earned two baccalaureates and the following year, gained her certificate in physics, chemistry and natural sciences (PCN), in preparation for medical studies. She then enrolled at the Institut de chimie appliquée, the future École nationale supérieure de chimie, where she studied for three years. She graduated in chemical engineering in 1923. Between 1922 and 1936 she earned five scientific degrees, in chemistry and biology.

== Career ==
On 1 June 1924, Benoit joined the Pasteur Institute as an assistant in the medicinal chemistry laboratory directed by Ernest Fourneau. Ten years later, in 1934, she received the Prix Louis from the Académie de Médecine for her research on sympathomimetic drugs. During that time, she was part of the first major advances in the fight against sleeping sickness and malaria through her significant chemical engineering contributions to the discovery and development of drugs such as orsanine and rhodoquine.

In 1942, Benoit defended her doctoral thesis on hydrazine compounds. She continued to work in the medical chemistry department, and was appointed head of the laboratory in 1943. In 1947, she was made a Knight of the Légion d'honneur.

In 1960, Benoit was recruited by Daniel Bovet to work at the Istituto Superiore di Sanità in Rome.

== Personal life ==
The following year, she married Albert Funke, who was also head of the laboratory of therapeutic chemistry at the Pasteur Institute, with whom she had collaborated for many years. The couple were friends with Jacques Monod. She and her husband retired in 1962 on their return from working in Italy.

Germaine Benoit died in Paris in April 1983.

== Publications ==
- 1927: Sur les isomères de l'acide para-oxy-3-amino-phényl-arsinique et de son dérivé acétylé (stovarsol) Bulletin de la Société chimique de France. 4 (in French). 41: 499–514. 1927. ScF-41-1927 with Ernest Fourneau and Jacques and Thérèse Tréfouël.
- 1930: Contribution à l'étude des anesthésiques locaux: Dérivés des amino-alcools à fonction alcoolique primaire Bull. Soc. chim. Fr., 4e série, vol.47, 1930, S. 858–885, with E. Fourneau and Roger Firmenich.
- 1930: Synthèse d'un isomère et d'un homologue de l'éphédrine Bull. Soc. chim. 4e série, vol.47, 1930, S. 894–980, with E. Fourneau and R. Firmenich.
- 1930: Contribution à la chimiothérapie du paludisme: Essais sur la malaria des canaris, Annales de l'Institut Pasteur, vol.44, no5, mai 1930, S. 503–533 (Zusammenfassung), with E. Fourneau, J. and Th. Tréfouël, Georges Stefanopoulo, Yvonne de Lestrange and Kenneth L. Melville.
- 1930: Préparation de dérivés en vue d'essais thérapeutiques. I. Amino-alcools. II. Dérivés de l'atophan. III. Dérivés du carbostyryle. IV. Dérivés quinoléiniques et quinoléine arsinique, Ann. Inst. Pasteur, vol.44, no6, Juni 1930, S. 719–751, with E. Fourneau and J. and Th. Tréfouël.
- 1931: Contribution à la chimiothérapie du paludisme: Essais sur les calfats, Ann. Inst. Pasteur, vol.46, 1931, S. 514–541, with E. Fourneau, J. and Th. Tréfouël and Daniel Bovet.
- 1933: Contribution à la chimiothérapie du paludisme: Essais sur les calfats (deuxième mémoire), Ann. Inst. Pasteur, vol.50, 1933, S. 731–744, with E. Fourneau, J. and Th. Tréfouël and D. Bovet.
- 1934: Action thérapeutique de quinoléines à poids moléculaire élevé, homologues de la plasmoquine, sur les hématozoaires des calfats et des serins, Bulletins de la Société de pathologie exotique et de ses filiales de l'Ouest africain et de Madagascar, vol.27, Nr. 3, 1934, S. 236–242, with D. Bovet and Reinout Altman.
- 1935: Étude chimique et physiologique d'amines à fonction éthylénique et de diamines, Bulletin des sciences pharmacologiques, vol.42, Nr. 1 und 2, Januar und Februar 1935, S. 34–43 und 102–109, with Rudolf Herzog.
- 1938: Synthèse et étude pharmacologique de quelques dérivés hétérocycliques voisins de l'amino-méthylbenzodioxane, Bull. sc. pharmacol., vol.45, Nr. 3, März 1938, S. 97–107, mit D. Bovet.
- 1942: Préparation et propriétés physiologiques de quelques hydroxy-alcoyl-hydrazines... Thèses présentées à la Faculté des sciences de l'Université de Paris pour obtenir le grade de docteur ès sciences physiques par Germaine Benoit.
- 1945: Sur l'acide corynanthique, Bull. Soc. chim. Fr., 5e série, vol.12, 1945, S. 934–936, with E. Fourneau.
- 1945: Éphédrine et isoéphédrines, Bull. Soc. chim. Fr., 5e série, vol.12, 1945, S. 985–989, with E. Fourneau.
- 1947: Hydroxy-alcoyl-hydrazines. 2., Bull. Soc. chim. Fr., 5e série, vol.14, Nr. 3–4, 1947, S. 242–244.
- 1950: Synthèse et propriétés thérapeutiques des dérivés aminés et hydroxylés du stilbène, Bull. Soc. chim. Fr., 5e série, vol.17, Nr. 9–10, 1950, S. 829–832, mit Dimitri Marinopoulos.
- 1951: Synthèse de quelques dérivés aminés du diphénylméthane, Bull. Soc. chim. Fr., 5e série, vol.18, 1951, S. 890–895, mit Fanny Eliopoulo.
- 1951 : "Activité spasmolytique des diphényl-1,1-diéthyl-amino-oméga-alcanes". Comptes rendus hebdomadaires des séances de l'Académie des sciences (in French). 232 (12): 1262–1264. 1951., with Joseph Jacob et F. Eliopoulo.
- 1952 : BENOIT G; DELAVIGNE R; ELIOPOULO F (April 1952). "Some Amino Alcohol Derivatives of Diphenyl-methane and of Diphenylamine". Annales pharmaceutiques françaises. 10 (3): 181–192. PMID 14953052., avec Roger Delavigne et F. Eliopoulo.
- 1953 : BENOIT G; DELAVIGNE R (May 1953). "Alkylaminoalkyl Derivatives of Benzhydrylamine". Ann. Pharm. Fr. 11 (5): 354–361. PMID 13080842., with R. Delavigne.
- 1953 : "Action de l'éthylénimine sur les époxydes". Bull. Soc. Chim. Fr. 5 (in French). 20 (10). 1953. Action1953., with Albert Funke.
- 1955: Ammoniums quaternaires dans la série des acides hydroxamiques. I: Synthèse d'iodométhylates d'acides diméthylaminobenzoylhydroxamiques, antagonistes du diisopropyfluorophosphate, C. r. hebd. séances Acad. sci., vol.240, Nr. 26, 27. Juni 1955, S. 2575–2577, with A. Funke and J. Jacob.
- 1955: Synthèse et propriétés pharmacologiques de quelques ω-phényl-ω-carbétoxy-alcoyl-1-méthyl-4-pipérazines, C. r. hebd. séances Acad. sci., vol.241, Nr. 6, September 1955, S. 581–583, with Bal Krishna Avasthi, J. Jacob and Monique Dechavassine.
- 1955: Action de l'éthylénénimine sur les époxydes. 2., Bull. Soc. chim. Fr., 5e série, vol.22, Nr. 7–8, 1955, S. 946–947, with Albert Funke.
- 1958: Synthèse d'acides diméthylaminobenzoylhydroxamiques et de leurs dérivés, Bull. Soc. chim. Fr., 5e série, vol.25, Nr. 2, 1958, S. 257–258, with A. Funke.
- 1958: Sur quelques dérivés N,N-disubstitués de la pipérazine, Bull. Soc. chim. Fr., vol.25, Nr. 11–12, 1958, S. 1358–1364, with Bal Krishna Avasthi.
- 1959: Contribution à l'étude des propriétés chimiques de la R-bêta-cyclohexyltétraline-I, Bull. Soc. chim. Fr., vol.26, Nr. 7–8, 1959, S. 1197–1199, with R. Delavigne.
- 1960: Benzodioxoles-1,3 substitués, Bull. Soc. chim. Fr., 5e série, vol.27, Nr. 4, 1960, S. 638–642, mit B. Millet.
- 1961: Dérivés de la phényl-2 dihydro-2,3 benzothiazine-1,4, Bull. Soc. chim. Fr., 5e série, vol.28, Nr. 8–9, 1961, S. 1524 ff., mit A. Funke und B. Millet.

== Image ==
- Portrait photograph of Germaine Benoit by Henri Manuel (c. 1925).
