= Tréfouël =

Tréfouël is a surname. Notable people with the surname include:

- Jacques Tréfouël (1897–1977), French chemist
- Thérèse Tréfouël (1892–1978), French biochemist

== See also ==
- Trefu
