= Paul Gelmo =

Paul Josef Jakob Gelmo (17 December 1879 – 22 October 1961) was an Austrian chemist who worked on synthetic dyes and discovered sulfanilamide in 1908, although their antibiotic properties were discovered only in 1932.

Gelmo was born in Vienna and went to the Technische Hochschule where he received a diploma in 1903 and a doctorate in 1906. He then worked with Wilhelm Suida. During this period he examined azo dyes and synthesized several compounds, including sulfanilamide for applications in dyeing. From 1910 he worked as chief chemist for the Austrian Printing Office, and in 1929 he became a lecturer in chemistry at the Technische Hochschule. In 1932 Gerhard Domagk found that the dye prontosil inhibited streptococci and the active metabolite was identified as sulfonilamide, and it was the most cheaply produced antibacterial drug of its time.
