= M&B =

M&B may refer to:

- May & Baker, a British chemical company
  - The drug Sulfapyridine, manufactured by May & Baker
- Mills & Boon, the romance imprint of British publisher Harlequin UK Ltd.
- Meridian and Bigbee Railroad, a U.S. railroad
- Mount & Blade, a computer game
- Mitchells & Butlers, a British pub chain company
- Mitchells & Butlers Brewery
