= Flupropadine =

Names
- Preferred IUPAC name 1-{3-[3,5-Bis(trifluoromethyl)phenyl]prop-2-yn-1-yl}-4-tert-butylpiperidine

Identifiers
CAS Number	81613-59-4
3D model (JSmol)	Interactive image
ChemSpider	117951
PubChem CID	133730
UNII	6JFR905U9C
CompTox Dashboard (EPA)	DTXSID5058191
- InChI: InChI=1S/C20H23F6N/c1-18(2,3)15-6-9-27(10-7-15)8-4-5-14-11-16(19(21,22)23)13-17(12-14)20(24,25)26/h11-13,15H,6-10H2,1-3H3 Key: KCVJZJNNTBOLKH-UHFFFAOYSA-N
- SMILES: CC(C)(C)C1CCN(CC1)CC#Cc2cc(cc(c2)C(F)(F)F)C(F)(F)F

Properties
Chemical formula	C_{20}H_{23}F_{6}N
Molar mass	391.401 g·mol^{−1}
- Except where otherwise noted, data are given for materials in their standard state (at 25 °C [77 °F], 100 kPa). Infobox references

Flupropadine is a rodenticide. Originally made by May and Baker and tested on farms in the United Kingdom it was withdrawn from use by 1994. Flupropadine has a delayed action, and so rodents can have multiple feeds from the bait before being killed.

The molecule has two rings, one is a m-hexafluoroxylene, and the other is piperidine. Flupropadine is made from 3,5-bis(trifluoromethyl)iodobenzene, propargyl alcohol, and 4-tert-butylpiperidine.
