= Poulenc Frères =

French company

Établissements Poulenc Frères
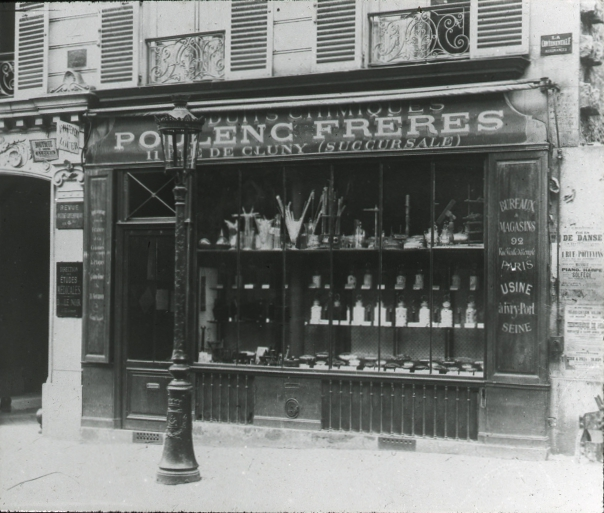
- Poulenc Frères branch store at 11 rue de Cluny, Paris, opened in 1886
- Industry: Pharmaceuticals
- Founded: 1881
- Defunct: 1928
- Fate: Merged
- Successor: Rhône-Poulenc
- Headquarters: France

Poulenc Frères (French: [pulɛ̃k]; Poulenc Brothers) was a French chemical, pharmaceutical and photographic supplies company that had its origins in a Paris pharmacy founded in 1827. From 1852 it began to manufacture (or package) photographic chemicals. It took the name Poulenc Frères in 1881, and by 1900 had a range of high-quality products. That year it went public as the Établissements Poulenc Frères. It began production of synthetic medicines, and continued to grow during World War I (1914–18). In 1928 it merged with the Société des usines chimiques du Rhône to form Rhône-Poulenc.

== Origins ==
The company can trace its roots to the Pharmacie-Droguerie Hédouin, a pharmacy founded in 1827 in the rue Saint-Merri, Paris. The baker Pierre Wittman (1798–1880) bought the store in 1845. His daughter, Pauline Wittmann (1828–1910), married Étienne Poulenc (1823–78) in February 1851. They had three sons: Gaston (1852–1948), Emile (Note: Emile Poulenc married Jenny Royer. Their only son, born on 7 January 1899, was the future composer Francis Poulenc.) (1855–1917) and Camille (1864–1942).

Etienne Poulenc was a pharmacist and a chemist, and partnered with his father-in-law. He became sole owner in 1858. With his brother-in-law Léon Whittman, Etienne began to manufacture photographic products, which up to then the business had only retailed, under the "P.W." brand. Starting in 1852 the products needed for photographic collodion were prepared or packaged in a factory in Vaugirard. These included silver bromide and iodide, iodine chloride and sodium thiosulfate ("hypo"). In 1859 Poulenc opened a factory in Ivry-sur-Seine that prepared salts of iron and antimony, and many products needed for manufacture and processing of the new gelatin-silver bromide plates, which had replaced collodion: ammonium ferric citrate, sodium acetate, and compounds for fixing and developing the photographs.

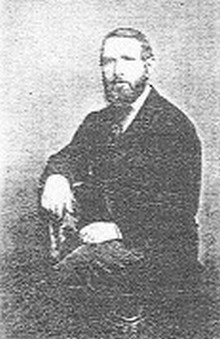
Etienne Poulenc c. 1870

Étienne Poulenc became well known for manufacturing chemical products for use in photography. Poulenc et Wittmann of 7 rue Neuve-Saint-Merri exhibited at the 1878 Universal Exposition. The firm sold chemical, pharmaceutical, photographic and industrial products.

== Poulenc Frères ==
Etienne Poulenc died in 1878. His wife continued the business, and soon brought in her oldest sons Gaston and Emile. The company was renamed Veuve Poulenc et Fils (Poulenc Widow and Sons) in 1878, then Poulenc Frères (Poulenc Brothers) in 1881. The Poulenc brothers manufactured laboratory equipment as well as distributing chemical products of guaranteed purity and reagents for research laboratories. They moved into pharmaceutical products such as sodium methylarsinate (1892), cacodylates, valerianate of Iron, quinine, calcium albuminate, copper albuminate, naphthol and phenol derivatives. They set up a new factory in Montreuil, Seine-Saint-Denis that manufactured antimony, iron, tin and silver salts for glassware and ceramics, and also produced laboratory reagents.

In the 1890s Poulenc Frères produced fine inorganic iodides and bromides for medical use, pure chemicals such as lithium, chromium and molybdenum for scientific research and chemicals such as potassium bromide for photography. The company was the leading supplier of fine chemicals to pharmacists and researchers, and the leader source of photographic supplies. However, it did not manufacture most of these goods. The company expanded by producing colors for glass and ceramics.

Camille Poulenc, who had been born in Paris in 1864, was the youngest child of Etienne and Pauline. He was educated by the Brothers of the Christian Schools of Passy, then dedicated himself to pharmacy and research. He studied under Henri Moissan, who made him first investigate gaseous bodies. He qualified as a pharmacist in 1891 and a doctor of science in 1893. He then joined the family company. After Camille joined, the company opened a research laboratory to produce pure and rigorously controlled mineral salts. He added a scientific library to the laboratory. Camille became interested in radium in 1900 and met Pierre and Marie Curie, who gave him a sample of the metal so he could study its effects. Camille's most important achievement was to start manufacturing medicines using organic and synthetic chemistry.

== Établissements Poulenc Frères ==
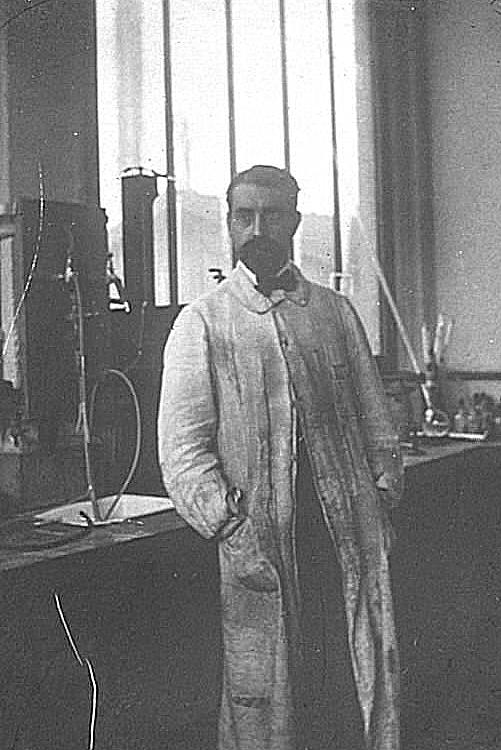
Ernest Fourneau in the Poulenc Frères laboratory in Ivry (1909).

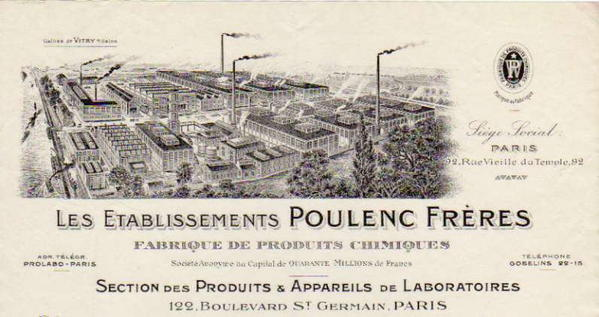
Poulenc Frères letterhead 1913

In 1900 Poulenc Frères became a public limited company, the Établissements Poulenc Frères. The three brothers held about 2/3 of the capital. The company had a capital of 4 million francs and was backed by the Banque privée Lyon-Marseille. In 1900 the Établissements Poulenc Frères occupied several sites including a branch on the rue Vieille-du-Temple in the 3rd arrondissement, a shop on the boulevard Saint-Germain in the 6th arrondissement, factories in Ivry port and Ivry center and a colorant factory at Montreuil-sous-Bois.

The Établissements Poulenc Frères exhibited at the Exposition Universelle of 1900. A laboratory was opened where experiments on animals could be conducted. The company purchased a large property in Vitry-sur-Seine, and bought a small organic product company in Livron-sur-Drôme. Poulenc Frères began to commercialize photographic film, and then rayon. In 1903 it opened a new establishment on the rue du Quatre-Septembre in Paris dedicated to photography products and materials with a projection room in the basement that could seat 100 people. The company did not try to become a global leader, but did succeed in competition with Swiss and German manufacturers.

Ernest Fourneau joined as a researcher. He was a pupil of Friedel and Moureu who had studied in the German laboratories of Ludwig Gattermann in Heidelberg, Hermann Emil Fischer in Berlin and Richard Willstätter in Munich. In 1903, Ernest Fourneau took over the management of a newly created pharmaceutical research department whose laboratories were located in Ivry. He headed the research laboratory in Ivry-sur-Seine from 1903 to 1911.

One of the products was a synthetic local anesthetic that was named "Stovaine" (Amylocaine). This was a pun on the English translation of "fourneau" as "stove". At the end of 1903 Fourneau and Poulenc frères filed the patents for stovaïne, the first commercially exploitable synthetic local anesthetic which remained in use until the 1940s. Other important medicines were antipyretics. In 1910 Fourneau accepted the directorship of the Pasteur Institute's therapeutic chemistry section, with the condition that he maintained his ties with Poulenc Frères. The relationship with the Paris-based Pasteur Institute, a leading medical research center, gave the company a valuable advantage.

A new plant was built in Vitry-sur-Seine in 1907. The company transferred its factories there from Ivry. By 1913 the company had 480 employees. There were eleven pharmacists, five civil engineers and nineteen chemists. The Poulenc brothers became interested in the research into catalytic hydrogenation being undertaken by Paul Sabatier and Jean-Baptiste Senderens in Toulouse. In 1913 they invited the Abbé Senderens to move to Vitry. The company developed and manufactured new organic and mineral products. Research by Fourneau and Francis Billon gave Poulenc Frères the ability to copy German synthetic drugs before 1914, although at first their versions of these drugs were not profitable.

The outbreak of World War I (1914–18) brought new business to most French chemical companies, including Poulenc Frères. The government gave the company contracts to produce poison gas and antidotes for poison gas. It started producing German products that could no longer be obtained in France and England, including the syphilis treatments salvarsan (arsphenamine) and neo-salvarsan. Between 1914 and 1916 the workforce grew from 500 to 2,000 and sales from 15.7 million francs to nearly 36 million francs. Poulenc Frères had made an agreement in 1909 by which the British firm May & Baker could license Poulenc's patents, which took effect in 1916. May & Baker opened a new research laboratory for chemotherapeutic products in Wandsworth.

The company managed to weather the industrial crisis of 1920. Based on expanded sales during the war and the expectation that Germany would offer less competition after the war, Poulenc Frères expanded their production capacity for synthetic drugs. In 1927 the company bought a controlling interest in May & Baker. After the take-over, May & Baker research technicians were trained by Poulenc Frères. In 1928 the Établissements Poulenc Frères merged with the Société chimique des usines du Rhône, which had been founded in 1895, to form Rhône-Poulenc. After the merger Rhône-Poulenc was the largest producer of organic chemicals other than dyes in France.

== Sources ==
- Cassis, Youssef; Crouzet, François; Gourvish, Terence Richard (1995), Management and Business in Britain and France: The Age of the Corporate Economy, Clarendon Press, ISBN 978-0-19-828940-1
- Chandler, Alfred Dupont (2009-06-30), Shaping the Industrial Century: The Remarkable Story of the Evolution of the Modern Chemical and Pharmaceutical Industries, Harvard University Press, ISBN 978-0-674-02937-8
- Debue-Barazer, Christine (2007-11-11), "Les implications scientifiques et industrielles du succès de la Stovaïne®. Ernest Fourneau (1872–1949) et la chimie des médicaments en France", Gesnerus, 64 (1–2): 24–53, doi:10.1163/22977953-0640102002, ISSN 0016-9161
- Guotjeannin, Charles (1993), "Les Pharmaciens Promoteurs de la Photographie d'Amateur", Revue d'histoire de la pharmacie (in French), 81 (298)
- Lacombe, Hervé (2013-01-23), Francis Poulenc, Fayard, ISBN 978-2-213-67675-3
- Lesch, John E. (2007), The First Miracle Drugs: How the Sulfa Drugs Transformed Medicine, Oxford University Press, ISBN 978-0-19-518775-5
- Michel, Jean-Marie (2016), "Les établissements Poulenc frères", Contribution a l'histoire des polymers en France (PDF), Societé Chemique de France, archived from the original (PDF) on 2013-07-17
- "Pierre WITTMANN", geneanet
- Quirke, Viviane (2012-10-12), Collaboration in the Pharmaceutical Industry: Changing Relationships in Britain and France, 1935–1965, Routledge, ISBN 978-1-134-39098-4
- Richet, Nicole, Camille Poulenc (1864-1942) (in French), Société d'Histoire de la Pharmacie
- Shapiro, Robert (2014-07-01), Les Six: The French Composers and Their Mentors Jean Cocteau and Erik Satie, Peter Owen Publishers, ISBN 978-0-7206-1774-0
- Smith, Michael Stephen (2006), The Emergence of Modern Business Enterprise in France, 1800-1930, Harvard University Press, ISBN 978-0-674-01939-3
