= Marlborough Apartment Hotel fire =

1940 fire

Coordinates: 44.9680°N 93.2702°W

Marlborough Apartment Hotel Fire

The Marlborough Apartment Hotel fire was a fire that claimed 19 lives on January 3, 1940, in Minneapolis, Minnesota. It remains the worst fire in city history.

== Hotel ==
The Marlborough Apartment Hotel was built around 1895. It had 56 single rooms and 23 apartment units and housed over 120 tenants. It was a combination residence and hotel, with largely permanent residents.

== Event ==
Around 5:45 a.m. on January 3, hotel janitor Otto Knaack was in the hallway when there was an explosion in the boiler room. Fifteen fire engines and five trucks with around 130 firemen arrived, but near-zero temperatures limited their effectiveness. The building was already burning significantly when they arrived and the water used to douse the flames froze.

Many fled through corridors with coats over their heads but the stairways were soon consumed by fire. Trapped residents screamed for help and smashed windows with fists, chairs, and shoes as they tried to escape. Passerby Henry Kadlac caught children who jumped out of the burning building. One man pushed his wife out the window, unwilling to wait for ladders, and jumped out after her. She died while he survived.

Out of around 120 people housed in the building, 19 died. Many of those who died had jumped from top floors while others were trapped or died of smoke inhalation. At least 40 people were injured, including two firemen. Twenty-three required hospital treatment. Survivors, many with severe burns and fractures, were treated at Minneapolis General Hospital. Several were treated with sulfanilamide, an antibacterial ointment considered a "wonder drug" of its time.

Fire investigators were unable to determine the cause of the fire. It was concluded probable that a "heat explosion" had been caused by a burning cigarette thrown down the garbage chute, which led to the garbage catching fire. The hotel, which was 45 years old, had been inspected in 1936 and no fire code violations had been noted. Later investigations confirmed that a building deficiency did not cause the blaze and that the owner, Henry Janise, who lived at the hotel, was not responsible for the disaster.

The fire led the city's building inspector to enforce codes more stringently, cracking down on illegally crowded buildings or buildings with inadequate stairways.
