= Jean-Claude Fourneau =

French painter (1907–1981)

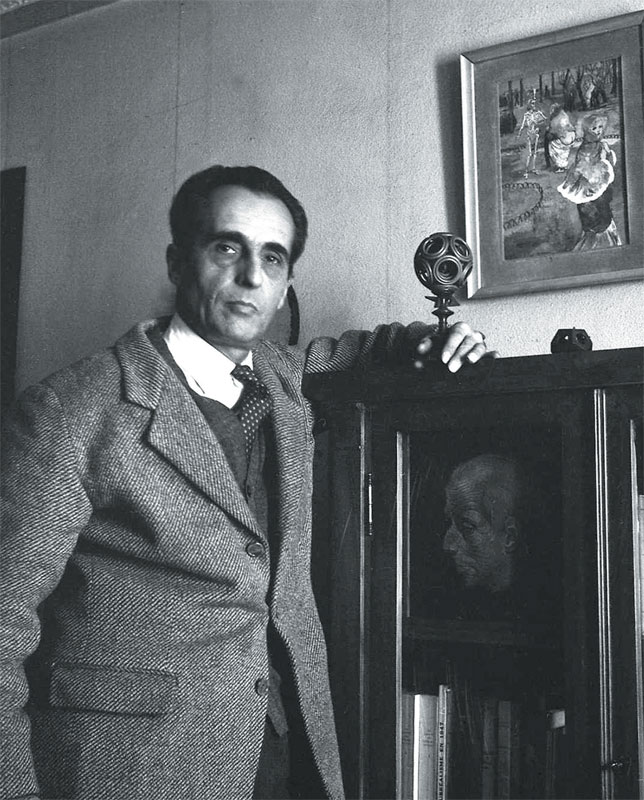
- Photographic self-portrait In the glass cabinet is a portrait of Max Ernst by Hans Bellmer.
- Born: 28 March 1907; Paris
- Died: 9 October 1981 (aged 74); Paris
- Known for: Painting, drawing
- Notable work: Portraits of: Felix Yusupov, Général Catroux, Jean Paulhan, Dominique Aury, Anne-Aymone Giscard d'Estaing, etc.
- Movement: Surrealism
- Website: jcfourneau.com

Jean-Claude Fourneau (28 March 1907 – 9 October 1981) was a French painter, who was close to the surrealist movement.

He played the role of Bishop Cauchon in Robert Bresson's film The Trial of Joan of Arc (1962).

== Biography ==
His mother was a descendant of Victor de Lanneau, restorer of the Collège Sainte-Barbe in Paris; of Juliette Adam, founder of a French paper, La Nouvelle Revue, and muse of Léon Gambetta and the spiritual mother of Pierre Loti. She was the daughter of Paul Segond, pioneer in the field of surgical gynaecology.

His father, Ernest Fourneau, was the founder of French medicinal chemistry.

Jean-Claude Fourneau was a painter influenced by both classicism and surrealism. He was first noticed by André Salmon at Fourneau's show at the Jeanne Castel Gallery in 1932. He continued exhibiting there until 1948.

Claude Roger-Marx compared his drawings to those of a medium and appreciated their meticulousness: "The detail in Jean-Claude Fourneau's drawings gives us a sense of the infinite (...) Fascinating in the power and sensitivity that every stroke of his brush conveys." For the literary character of his work, the critic quoted the artist himself: "I cannot conceive of a man painting who has no culture. I do not distinguish between painting and poetry, they both strive towards the same goal."

Fourneau soon specialised in portraiture and built himself a solid reputation. Oriane de La Panouse, the countess of Paris, the Harcourt, Brantes, Faucigny-Lucinge, Seillière, Broglie, Pourtalès, Maillé, Montesquiou, Wendel families were amongst his clients.

An intimate circle of people supported his work, leading François Pluchart to state in the review Combat during the André Weil Gallery show in 1963: "The Parisian fashion and intellectual circle has found its painter". During 1961, he took the role of Bishop Cauchon in Robert Bresson's film The Trial of Joan of Arc (1962).

A show in Casablanca in 1954 made him known in Morocco, where he lived for several years. He painted the portraits of Lalla Malika, the sister of King Hassan II, of Lalla Lamia, his step sister, of Karim Lamrani, his prime minister, of General Oufkir, and other members of the Moroccan Royal Court. Claude Rivière stated that Fourneau was the opposite of being a fashionable painter: "A great admirer of Antonin Artaud, of Paulhan, and of Aragon, the artist, with a fervour born of all the existential interstices due to his being, will first and foremost clash with his model. He dispossesses him of his own myths so that they may be recreated in the dimensions he wants to affirm." Jean Paulhan asked: "By what means (or what secret) is it given to J.-C. Fourneau to have at his disposal both such abundance and such harshness?"

Fourneau appeared in a photograph of surrealist artists gathered at the Café Cyrano in 1953, and André Breton mentioned him as being part of the group. Breton was a form of tutor to Fourneau, for whom he had much affection and confirmed the influence of surrealism in its literary and artistic form in his work.

Fourneau wrote to Breton at his address, rue Fontaine, in 1954 to try to temper the case of the erotic novel Story of O, of which he was a fervent defender, with the representation of the subliminal woman in Arcane 17, an essay by Breton. "As if l'amour fou, 'elected love' could not find better fulfillment than through the paradoxical game of the resolution of opposites: pleasure and pain, violence and gentleness, libertinism and fidelity, strength and weakness..."

On his return to Paris in 1968, Jean-Claude Fourneau resumed portrait painting, and his last exhibition was held in 1976.

== Work ==
- Portrait of Andrée Seillière, oil on canvas, 1942 (coll. Andrée Jaigu)
- Portrait of Josée de Chambrun, oil on canvas, 1947 (coll. Josée and René de Chambrun Foundation)
- Portrait of Felix Yusupov, oil on canvas, 1951 (coll. Fourneau)
- Portrait of Agnès Bourgois, oil on plywood, 1953 (coll. Fondation Agnès Troublé, dite agnès b.)
- Portrait of Général Catroux, oil on canvas, 1955 (coll. Maison d'éducation de la Légion d'honneur, Saint-Denis)
- Portrait of Céleste Albaret, oil on canvas, 1957 (coll. Fourneau)
- Portrait of Princess Lalla Malika of Morocco, oil on canvas, 1958 (coll. Royal Palace of Rabat)
- Portrait of Jeanne-Marie de Broglie, oil on canvas, 1958 (coll. J.-M. de Broglie)
- Portrait of Jean Paulhan, oil on plywood, 1964 (coll. Jacqueline Paulhan)
- Portrait of Dominique Aury, oil on Isorel, 1965 (coll. Fourneau)
- Portrait of Diane de France, oil on plywood (coll. Diane de Würtemberg)
- Portrait of Karl de Würtemberg, oil on canvas (coll. Karl de Würtemberg)
- Portrait of Anne-Aymone Giscard d’Estaing, oil on canvas, 1969 (coll. A.-A. Giscard d’Estaing)

== Exhibitions ==
=== Solo exhibitions ===
- 1948 : Galerie Jeanne Castel, Paris
- 1954 : Galerie du Livre, Casablanca
- 1962 : Centre culturel français, Rome
- 1963 : Galerie André Weil, Paris
- 1976 : Centre français d’art et d’artisanat, Paris

=== Exhibitions with others ===
- 1932 : Galerie Jeanne Castel, Paris
- 1933 : Galerie Jeanne Castel, Paris
- 1936 : Galerie Jeanne Castel, Paris
- 1938 : Galerie Montaigne, Paris
- 1939 : Salon des Tuileries, Paris
- 1946 : Galerie Jeanne Castel, Paris
- 1947 : Galerie Jeanne Castel, Paris
- 1949 : Galerie du Siècle, Paris

== Gallery ==
Works by Jean-Claude Fourneau

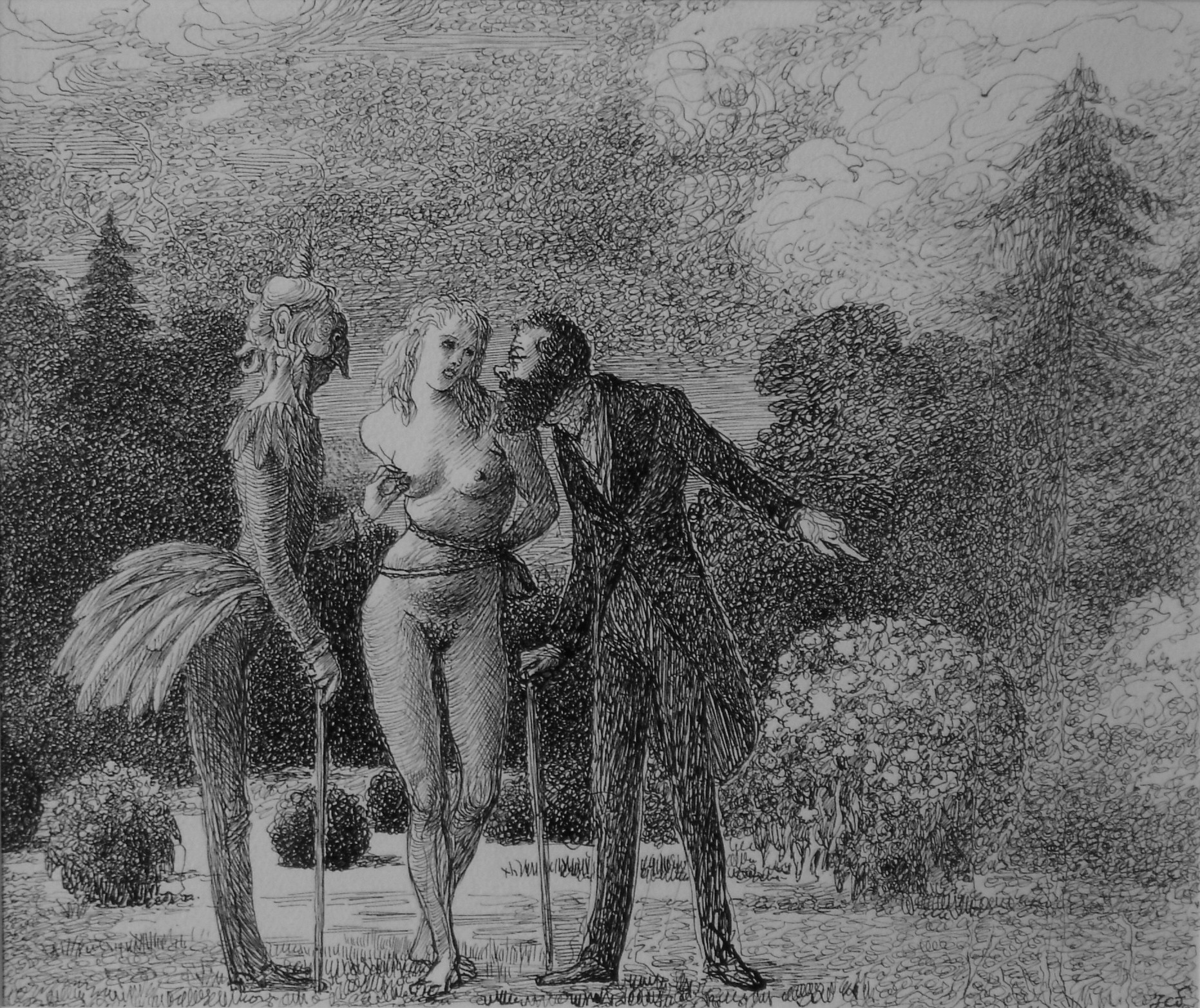
Jardin public,
c. 1935 (coll. Fourneau)

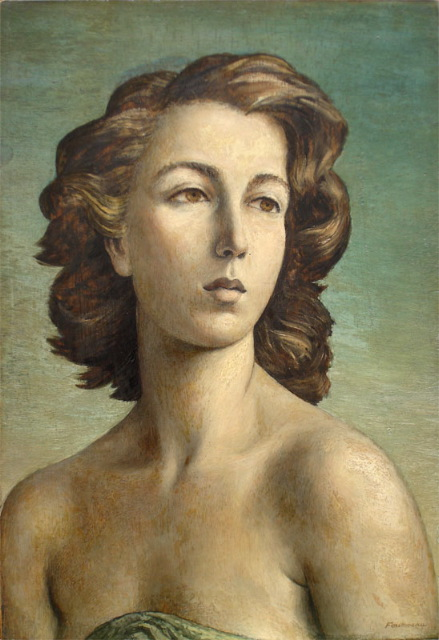
Francine Roberty, oil on plywood, 1950 (coll. Fourneau)

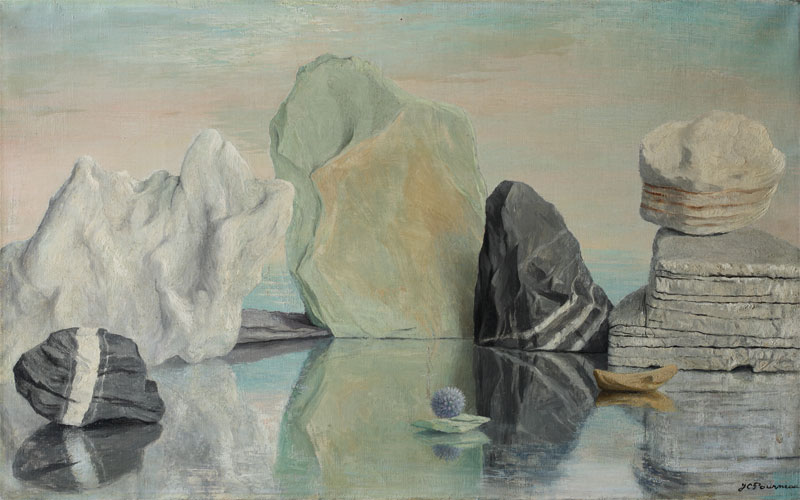
Pierres, c. 1960 (coll. Fourneau)

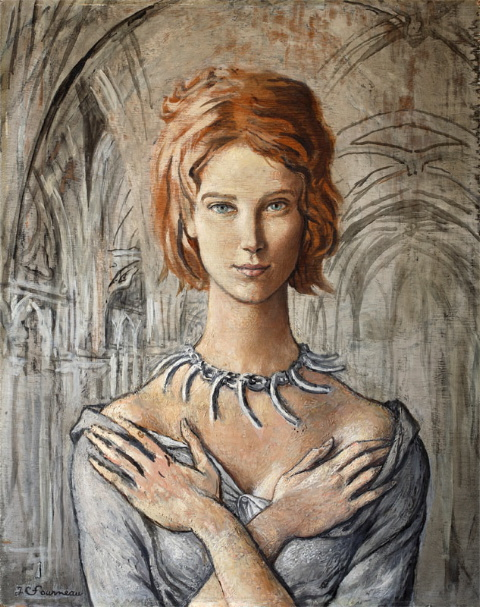
Nadine Cail,
oil on plywood, 1961 (coll. Fourneau)
