= Sulfapyridine =

Chemical compound

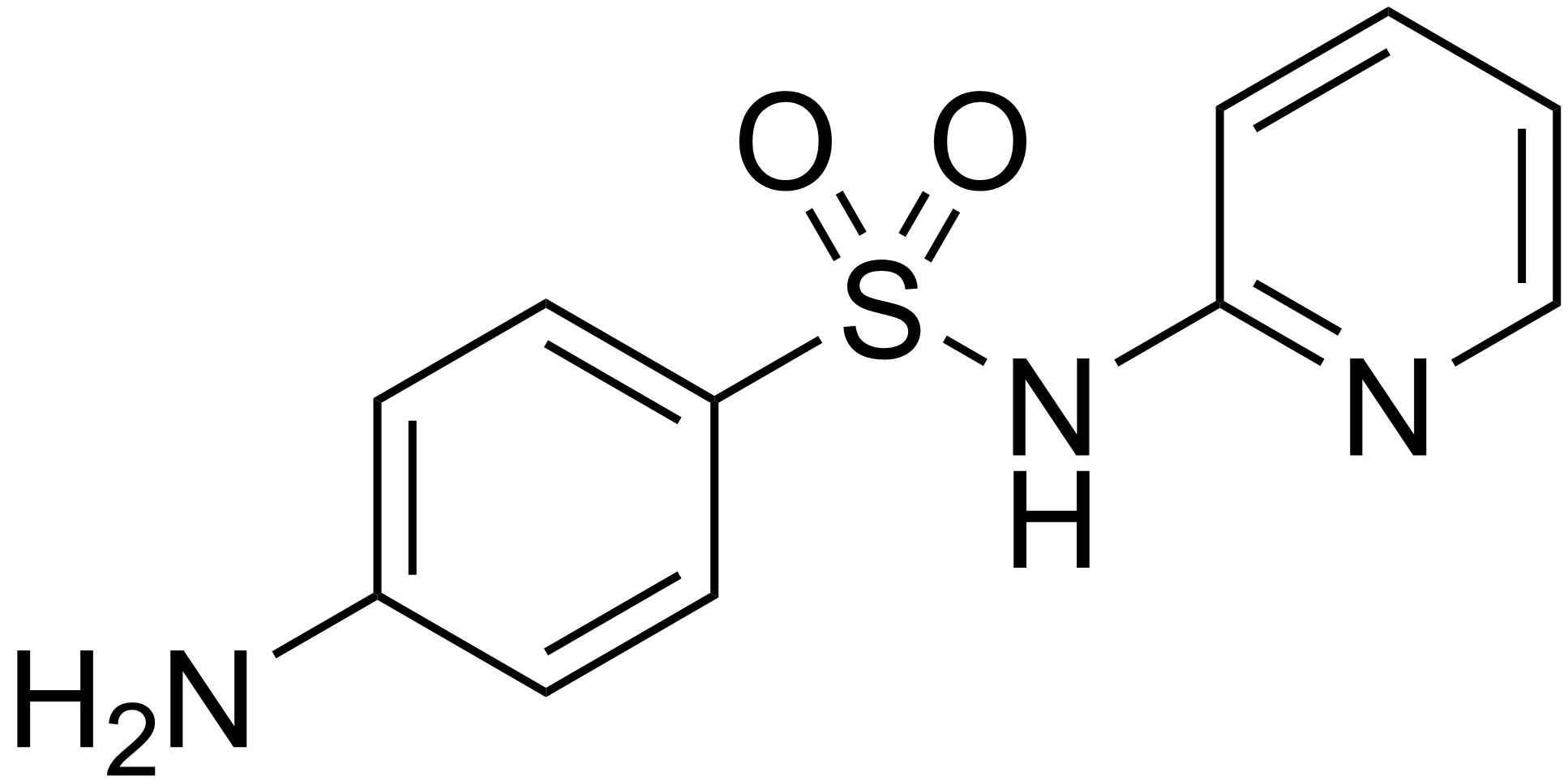

Clinical data
- AHFS/Drugs.com: Micromedex Detailed Consumer Information
- MedlinePlus: a682204
- ATC code: J01EB04 (WHO) QJ01EQ04 (WHO)

Identifiers
- IUPAC name: 4-Amino-N-pyridin-2-ylbenzenesulfonamide
- CAS Number: 144-83-2
- PubChem CID: 5336
- DrugBank: DB00891
- ChemSpider: 5145
- UNII: Y5V2N1KE8U
- KEGG: D02434
- ChEBI: CHEBI:132842
- ChEMBL: ChEMBL700
- CompTox Dashboard (EPA): DTXSID3026067
- ECHA InfoCard: 100.005.130

Chemical and physical data
- Formula: C_{11}H_{11}N_{3}O_{2}S
- Molar mass: 249.29 g·mol^{−1}
- 3D model (JSmol): Interactive image
- Melting point: 191 to 193 °C (376 to 379 °F)
- SMILES: O=S(=O)(Nc1ncccc1)c2ccc(N)cc2
- InChI: InChI=1S/C11H11N3O2S/c12-9-4-6-10(7-5-9)17(15,16)14-11-3-1-2-8-13-11/h1-8H,12H2,(H,13,14); Key:GECHUMIMRBOMGK-UHFFFAOYSA-N

Sulfapyridine (INN; also known as sulphapyridine) is a sulfanilamide antibacterial medication. At one time, it was commonly referred to as M&B 693. Sulfapyridine is no longer prescribed for treatment of infections in humans. However, it may be used to treat linear IgA disease and has use in veterinary medicine. It is a good antibacterial drug, but its water solubility is very pH dependent. Thus there is a risk of crystallization within the bladder or urethra, which could lead to pain or blockage. As with other sulfonamides, there is a significant risk of agranulocytosis, and this, rather than the development of resistance by bacteria, is the main reason for its decline in use.

== History ==
Sulfapyridine was one of the first generation of sulfonamide antibiotics. It was first synthesised by chemist Montague Phillips, working under director of research Arthur Ewins at the British firm May & Baker Ltd, Dagenham on 2 November 1937. This sample was recorded in their test log as T693.

Animal testing was conducted by clinical pathologist Lionel Whitby at the Bland-Sutton Institute of Pathology, Middlesex Hospital in London under the designation M&B 693. Whitby discovered the antibacterial properties of sulfapyridine against pneumococci and a range of other bacteria in mice.

Clinical trials were conducted between March and June 1938 at Dudley Road Hospital, Birmingham by doctors G. Mary Evans and Wilfrid Gaisford. These trials demonstrated a 70% reduction in mortality in 100 patients with lobar pneumonia.

May & Baker began marketing sulphapyridine in the UK under the trade name Dagenan in October 1938.

During the aftermath to the disastrous convoy SC7, in October 1940, Surgeon-Lieutenant John Robertson, RN, of HMS Leith, saved the life of Commodore Lachlan MacKinnon, from the torpedoed Assyrian, who had developed pneumonia, by giving him M&B 693, despite Robertson never having used it before and not knowing the required dosage.

M&B 693 was successfully used to treat Winston Churchill's bacterial pneumonia.

The same source records that in 1944 M&B 693 also saved Nero, the Royal Circus lion, from pneumonia.

It could either be taken in tablet form or the powder could be placed in wounds. It was used so widely during the Second World War that May & Baker had difficulty keeping up with demand. It was later largely superseded by penicillin and other sulfonamides.

Sulfapyridine may still be prescribed for Dermatitis herpetiformis, also known as Duhring's disease.

As of December 1990, the drug is no longer marketed.

== Related medications ==
The drug sulfasalazine is structurally one molecule of mesalamine linked to one molecule of sulfapyridine with an azo chemical linker.
