= Sulfanilamide =

Chemical compound

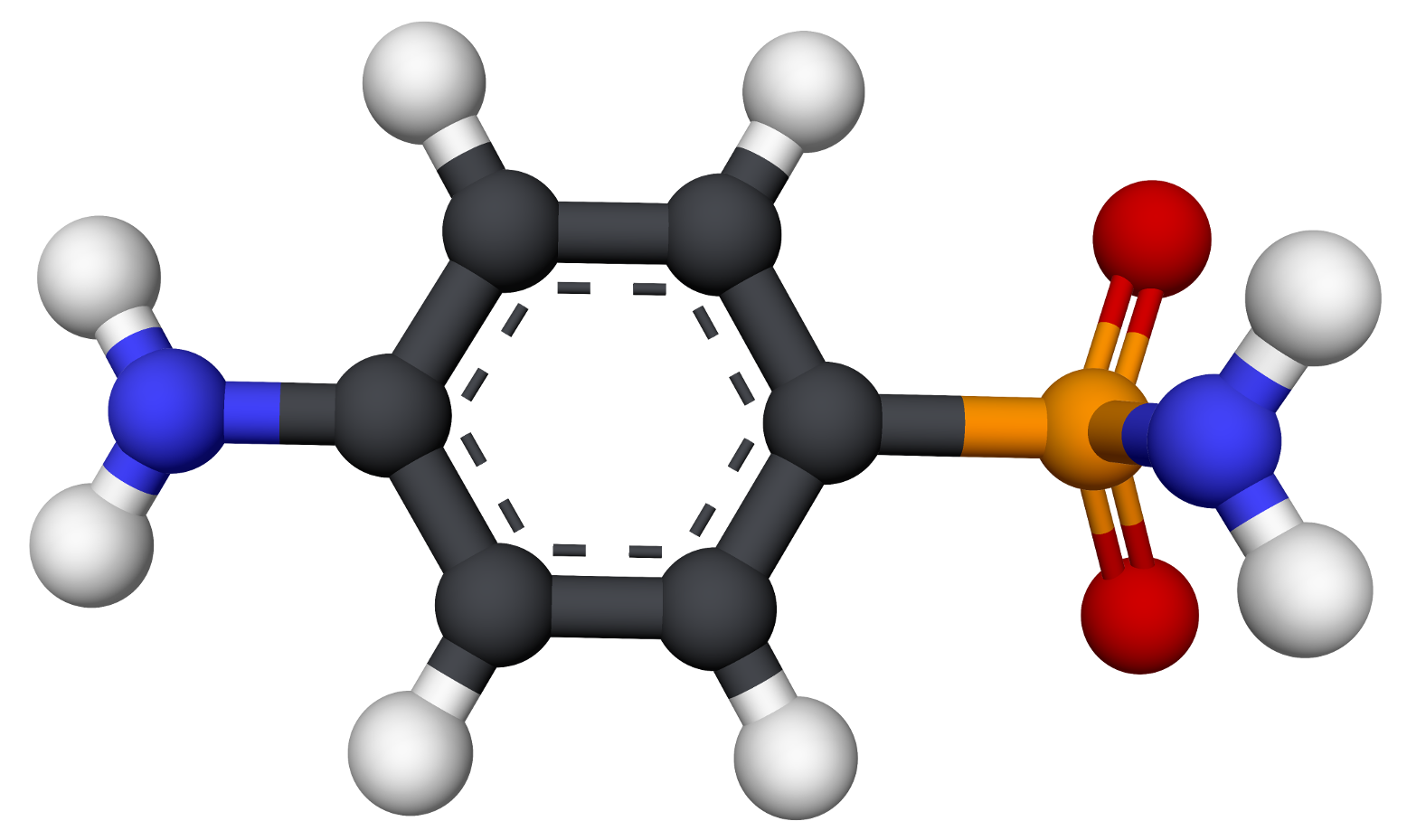

Clinical data
- AHFS/Drugs.com: salonemide Consumer Drug Information
- ATC code: J01EB06 (WHO) D06BA05 (WHO) QJ01EQ06 (WHO)

Identifiers
- IUPAC name: 4-aminobenzenesulfonamide
- CAS Number: 63-74-1
- PubChem CID: 5333
- DrugBank: DB00259
- ChemSpider: 5142
- UNII: 21240MF57M
- KEGG: D08543
- ChEBI: CHEBI:45373
- ChEMBL: ChEMBL21
- NIAID ChemDB: 019103
- CompTox Dashboard (EPA): DTXSID4023622
- ECHA InfoCard: 100.000.513

Chemical and physical data
- Formula: C_{6}H_{8}N_{2}O_{2}S
- Molar mass: 172.20 g·mol^{−1}
- 3D model (JSmol): Interactive image
- Density: 1.08 g/cm^{3}
- Melting point: 165 °C (329 °F)
- SMILES: O=S(=O)(c1ccc(N)cc1)N
- InChI: InChI=1S/C6H8N2O2S/c7-5-1-3-6(4-2-5)11(8,9)10/h1-4H,7H2,(H2,8,9,10); Key:FDDDEECHVMSUSB-UHFFFAOYSA-N

Sulfanilamide (also spelled sulphanilamide) is a sulfonamide antibacterial drug. Chemically, it is an organic compound consisting of an aniline derivatized with a sulfonamide group. Powdered sulfanilamide was used by the Allies in World War II to reduce infection rates and contributed to a dramatic reduction in mortality rates compared to previous wars. Sulfanilamide is rarely if ever used systemically due to toxicity and because more effective sulfonamides are available for this purpose. Modern antibiotics have supplanted sulfanilamide on the battlefield; however, sulfanilamide remains in use today in the form of topical preparations, primarily for treatment of vaginal yeast infections such as vulvovaginitis caused by Candida albicans.

The term "sulfanilamides" is also sometimes used to describe a family of molecules containing these functional groups. Examples include:

- Furosemide, a loop diuretic
- Sulfadiazine, an antibiotic
- Sulfamethoxazole, an antibiotic

== Mechanism of action ==
As a sulfonamide antibiotic, sulfanilamide functions by competitively inhibiting (that is, by acting as a substrate analogue of) enzymatic reactions involving para-aminobenzoic acid (PABA). Specifically, it competitively inhibits the enzyme dihydropteroate synthase. PABA is needed in enzymatic reactions that produce folic acid, which acts as a coenzyme in the synthesis of purines and pyrimidines. Mammals do not synthesize their own folic acid so are unaffected by PABA inhibitors, which selectively kill bacteria.

However, this effect can be reversed by adding the end products of one-carbon transfer reactions, such as thymidine, purines, methionine, and serine. PABA can also reverse the effects of sulfonamides.

== History ==
Sulfanilamide was first prepared in 1908 by the Austrian chemist Paul Josef Jakob Gelmo (1879–1961) as part of his dissertation for a doctoral degree from the Technische Hochschule of Vienna. It was patented in 1909.

Gerhard Domagk, who directed the testing of the prodrug Prontosil in 1935, and Jacques Tréfouël and Thérèse Tréfouël, who along with Federico Nitti and Daniel Bovet in the laboratory of Ernest Fourneau at the Pasteur Institute, determined sulfanilamide as the active form, are generally credited with the discovery of sulfanilamide as a chemotherapeutic agent. Domagk was awarded the Nobel Prize for his work.

In 1937, Elixir sulfanilamide, a medicine consisting of sulfanilamide dissolved in diethylene glycol, poisoned and killed more than one hundred people as a result of acute kidney failure, prompting new US regulations for drug testing. In 1938, the Food, Drug and Cosmetic Act was passed. It was only the solvent and not the sulfanilamide that was the problem, as sulfanilamide was widely and safely used at the time in both tablet and powder form.

== Chemical and physical properties ==
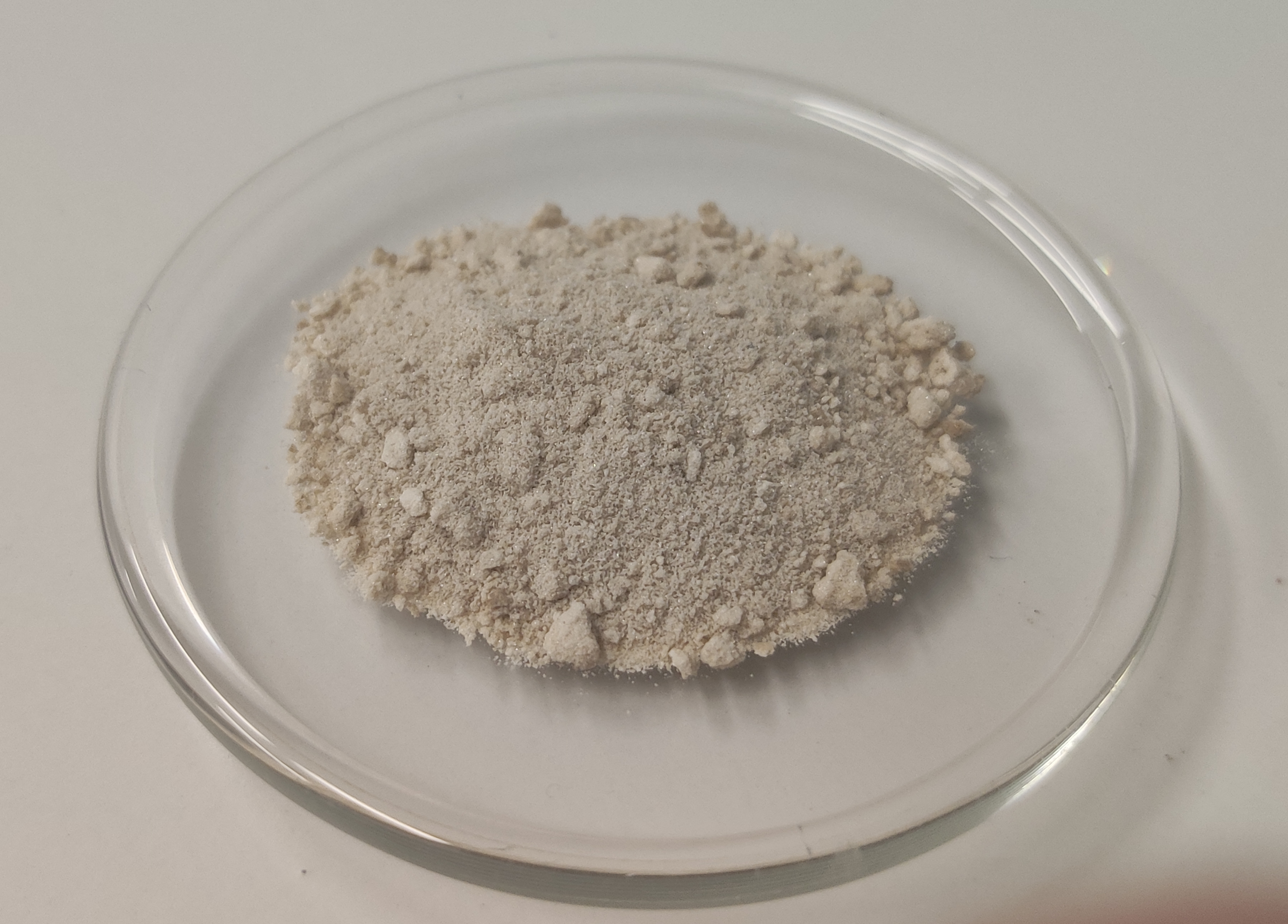
Laboratory synthesized sulfanilamide

Sulfanilamide is a yellowish-white or white crystal or fine powder. It has a density of 1.08 g/cm^{3} and a melting point of 164.5-166.5 °C. The pH of a 0.5% aqueous solution of Sulfanilamide is 5.8 to 6.1. It has a λ_{max} of 255 and 312 nm.

Solubility: One gram of sulphanilamide dissolves in approximately 37 ml alcohol or in 5 ml acetone. It is practically insoluble in chloroform, ether, or benzene.

== Contraindications ==
Sulfanilamide is contraindicated in those known to be hypersensitive to sulfonamides, in nursing mothers, during pregnancy near term, and in infants less than two months of age.

== Adverse effects ==
Since sulfanilamide is used almost exclusively in topical vaginal preparations these days, adverse effects are typically limited to hypersensitivity or local skin reactions. If absorbed, systemic side effects commonly seen with sulfanilamides may occur.

== Pharmacokinetics ==
A small amount of sulfanilamide is absorbed following topical application or when administered as a vaginal cream or suppository (through the vaginal mucosa). It is metabolized by acetylation like other sulfonamides and excreted through the urine.

== Use in synthesis ==
Sulfanilamide has use in the synthesis of Apricoxib, PheTQS, Sulfametrole, Sulfamethoxypyridazine, Sultiame, Sulfabenzamide, Stearylsulfamide, Sulfasuccinamide.
