= The Trial of Joan of Arc =

1962 film by Robert Bresson

- Original film poster
- French: Procès de Jeanne d'Arc
- Directed by: Robert Bresson
- Written by: Robert Bresson
- Produced by: Agnès Delahaie
- Starring: Florence Delay; Jean-Claude Fourneau
- Cinematography: Léonce-Henri Burel
- Edited by: Germaine Artus
- Music by: Francis Seyrig
- Production company: Agnes Delahaie Productions
- Distributed by: Pathé
- Release date: 18 May 1962 (Cannes)
- Running time: 65 minutes
- Country: France
- Languages: French; English

The Trial of Joan of Arc (French: Procès de Jeanne d'Arc) is a 1962 French historical drama film written and directed by Robert Bresson. Florence Delay stars as Joan of Arc, a French military leader, who is undergoing a trial on the charge of heresy in 1431, during the Hundred Years' War. The film won the Special Jury Prize at the 1962 Cannes Film Festival.

== Synopsis ==
In 1431 Jeanne d'Arc, a peasant girl who has led the French troops against the English during the third phase of the Hundred Years' War, is imprisoned for heresy and brought to trial by an pro-English court in Rouen. From the beginning of the trial it is made clear by English representatives that the sentence has to be Jeanne's execution by fire. Despite constant interrogations by the judges, Jeanne's faith in her mission, which she insists was assigned to her by God, remains unshaken. During the trial she is not only questioned but also tortured, her virginity examined, and molested. In a moment of weakness Jeanne recants her faith but later retracts her earlier confession. She is sentenced to death and burned at the stake.

== Cast ==
- Florence Delay (credited as Florence Carrez) as Jeanne d'Arc
- Jean-Claude Fourneau as Bishop Cauchon
- Roger Honorat as Jean Beaupère
- Marc Jacquier as Jean Lemaître
- Jean Gillibert as Jean de Chatillon
- Michel Herubel as Frère Isambert de la Pierre
- André Régnier as Jean d'Estivet
- André Brunet as Jean Massieu
- Marcel Darbaud as Nicolas de Houppeville
- Philippe Dreux as Frère Martin Ladvenu
- Paul-Robert Mimet as Guillaume Erard
- E. R. Pratt as Warwick
- Gérard Zingg as Jean Lohier
- André Maurice as Tiphaine
- Harry Sommers as Bishop of Winchester
- Donald O'Brien as English Priest
- Michael Williams as English Gentleman

== Production ==
As with all of Bresson's films after 1945, The Trial of Joan of Arc stars non-professional actors. In his version of the historical events, Bresson tried to "avoid 'theater' and 'masquerade', but to arrive at a non-historical truth by using historical words." He spoke unfavourably of Carl Theodor Dreyer's 1928 film, which covered the same subject, calling the actors' performances "horrible buffoonery". The screenplay is drawn from the transcriptions of Joan's trial and rehabilitation.

== Release ==
The Trial of Joan of Arc premiered in competition at the Cannes Film Festival in 1962. It was screened the following year at the first New York Film Festival and saw a limited New York theatrical release in 1965.

== Reception ==
The Trial of Joan of Arc was not warmly received by critics on its original release and for a long time regarded a minor work in the director's oeuvre, including critic Susan Sontag, who otherwise spoke highly positive of Bresson's work. An exception was director Jean-Luc Godard, who ranked the film as number one on his list of Ten Best Films of 1963. On the occasion of the film's 1965 New York release, Bosley Crowther (The New York Times) commented that Florence Delay delivered her dialogue "without change of expression and in a muted monotone" and faulted the overall "lack of dramatic highs and lows".

Retrospective reviews have been more positive, titling it a "gripping courtroom drama" (Kevin Maher, The Times) which features Delay as "one of the director's most perfect 'models'" (Melissa Anderson, The Village Voice) and culminates in an "unforgettable final image" (Gilbert Adair, Time Out).

=== Awards and nominations ===
The film won the Special Jury Prize at the 1962 Cannes Film Festival.
