= Sulfametrole =

Chemical compound

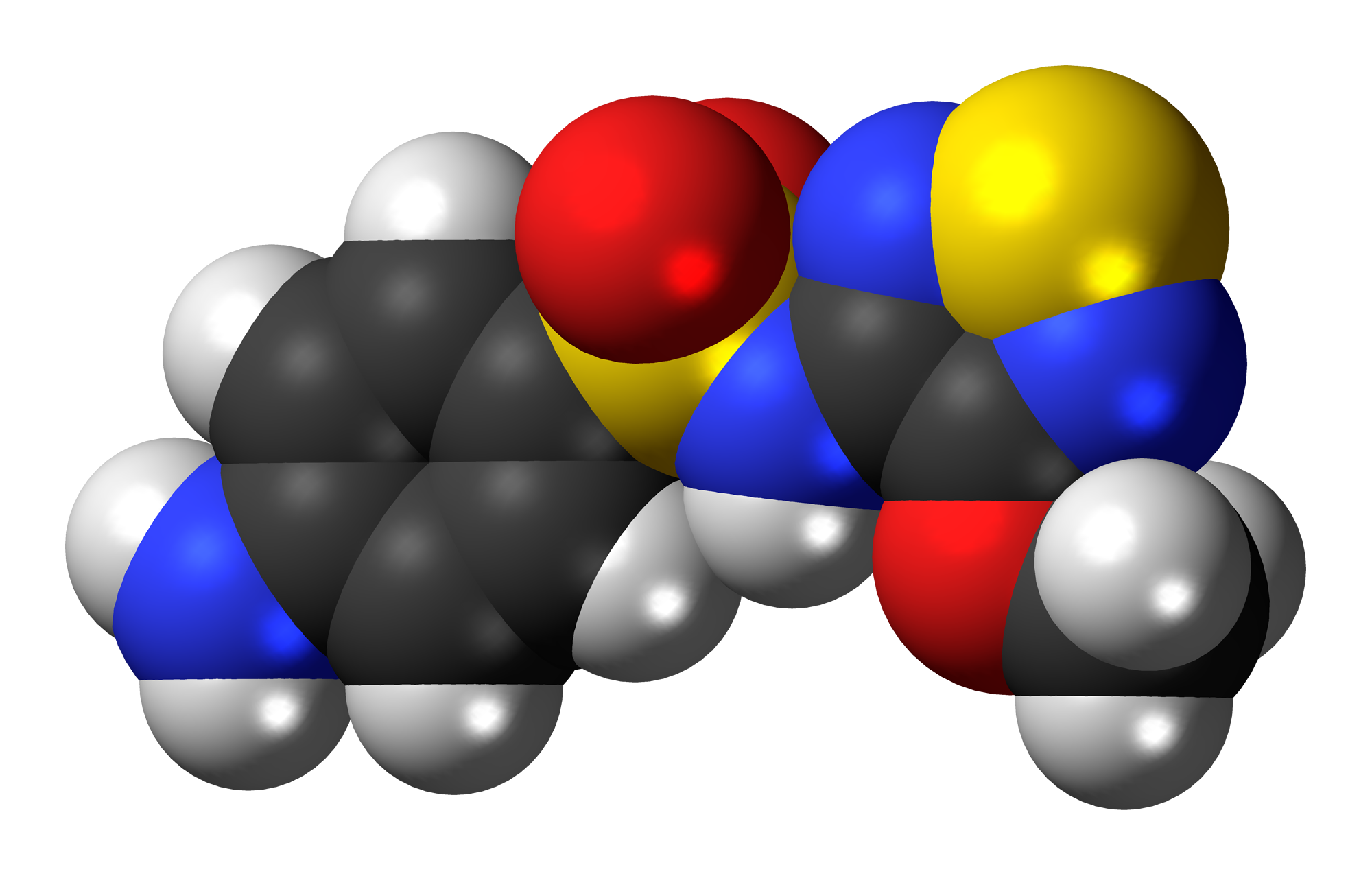

Clinical data
- AHFS/Drugs.com: International Drug Names
- Routes of administration: Oral
- ATC code: J01EE03 (WHO) (with trimethoprim)

Legal status
- Legal status: In general: ℞ (Prescription only)

Identifiers
- IUPAC name: 4-amino-N-(4-methoxy-1,2,5-thiadiazol-3-yl)benzenesulfonamide
- CAS Number: 32909-92-5
- PubChem CID: 64939
- ChemSpider: 58466
- UNII: F5AK41IPQG
- KEGG: D08541
- ChEBI: CHEBI:88258
- CompTox Dashboard (EPA): DTXSID40865655
- ECHA InfoCard: 100.046.611

Chemical and physical data
- Formula: C_{9}H_{10}N_{4}O_{3}S_{2}
- Molar mass: 286.32 g·mol^{−1}
- 3D model (JSmol): Interactive image
- SMILES: COc1c(nsn1)NS(=O)(=O)c2ccc(cc2)N
- InChI: InChI=1S/C9H10N4O3S2/c1-16-9-8(11-17-12-9)13-18(14,15)7-4-2-6(10)3-5-7/h2-5H,10H2,1H3,(H,11,13); Key:IZOYMGQQVNAMHS-UHFFFAOYSA-N

Sulfametrole (INN) is a sulfonamide antibacterial.

It can be given with trimethoprim.
