= Amylocaine =

Names
- IUPAC name [1-(Dimethylamino)-2-methylbutan-2-yl] benzoate
- Other names Stovaine; Benzoic acid [1-(dimethylaminomethyl)-1-methylpropyl] ester

Identifiers
CAS Number	644-26-8
3D model (JSmol)	Interactive image
ChEMBL	ChEMBL1740065
ChemSpider	10312
ECHA InfoCard	100.010.375
EC Number	211-411-1
KEGG	D07454
PubChem CID	10767
UNII	QRW683O56T
CompTox Dashboard (EPA)	DTXSID6047862
- InChI: InChI=1S/C14H21NO2/c1-5-14(2,11-15(3)4)17-13(16)12-9-7-6-8-10-12/h6-10H,5,11H2,1-4H3 Key: FDMBBCOBEAVDAO-UHFFFAOYSA-N; InChI=1/C14H21NO2/c1-5-14(2,11-15(3)4)17-13(16)12-9-7-6-8-10-12/h6-10H,5,11H2,1-4H3 Key: FDMBBCOBEAVDAO-UHFFFAOYAQ
- SMILES: O=C(OC(C)(CC)CN(C)C)c1ccccc1

Properties
Chemical formula	C_{14}H_{21}NO_{2}
Molar mass	235.327 g·mol^{−1}
- Except where otherwise noted, data are given for materials in their standard state (at 25 °C [77 °F], 100 kPa). verify (what is ?) Infobox references

Amylocaine was the first synthetic local anesthetic. It was synthesized and patented under the name Stovaine by Ernest Fourneau at the Pasteur Institute in 1903. It was used mostly in spinal anesthesia.

== Synthesis ==
Amylocaine can be synthesized beginning with chloroacetone (1). Grignard reaction of chloroacetone with magnesium ethyl bromide gives 1-chloro-2-methyl-butan-2-ol (2). Heating with dimethylamine gives 1-(dimethylamino)-2-methylbutan-2-ol (3). These two steps can also be treated as interchangeable. Esterification with benzoyl chloride completed the synthesis of amylocaine (4).

Synthesis of amylocaine

== See also ==
- Dimethylaminopivalophenone, an opioid with a similar chemical structure
