= Thérèse Tréfouël =

French biochemist (1892–1978)

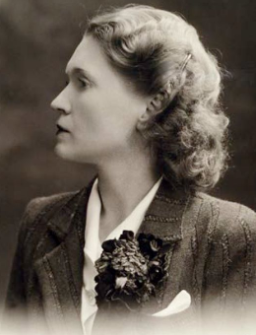
- Born: Thérèse Boyer; June 19, 1892
- Died: November 9, 1978 (aged 86)
- Education: University of Paris
- Known for: Research on sulfanilamide
- Spouse: Jacques Tréfouël
- Scientific career
- Fields: Medicinal chemistry
- Workplaces: Institut Pasteur
- Academic advisors: Ernest Fourneau

Thérèse Tréfouël (née Boyer, 19 June 1892 — 9 November 1978) was a French researcher specialized in medicinal chemistry. Along with her husband, Jacques Tréfouël, she is best known for her research on sulfonamides, when they were a novel class of antibiotic drugs.

== Education and personal life ==
Between 1913 and 1919, Thérèse Boyer studied chemistry at the Faculté des Sciences, in Paris. She met her husband Jacques when they were assigned as lab partners after both failing to sign up to a practical course on time. Jacques and Thérèse married in 1921. They were known for the strength of their partnership and collaboration. Even after their retirement from scientific research, the Tréfouëls continued to collaborate on various projects: Jacques was fascinated by metalwork and woodwork, and would construct furniture which Thérèse upholstered.

== Research and career ==
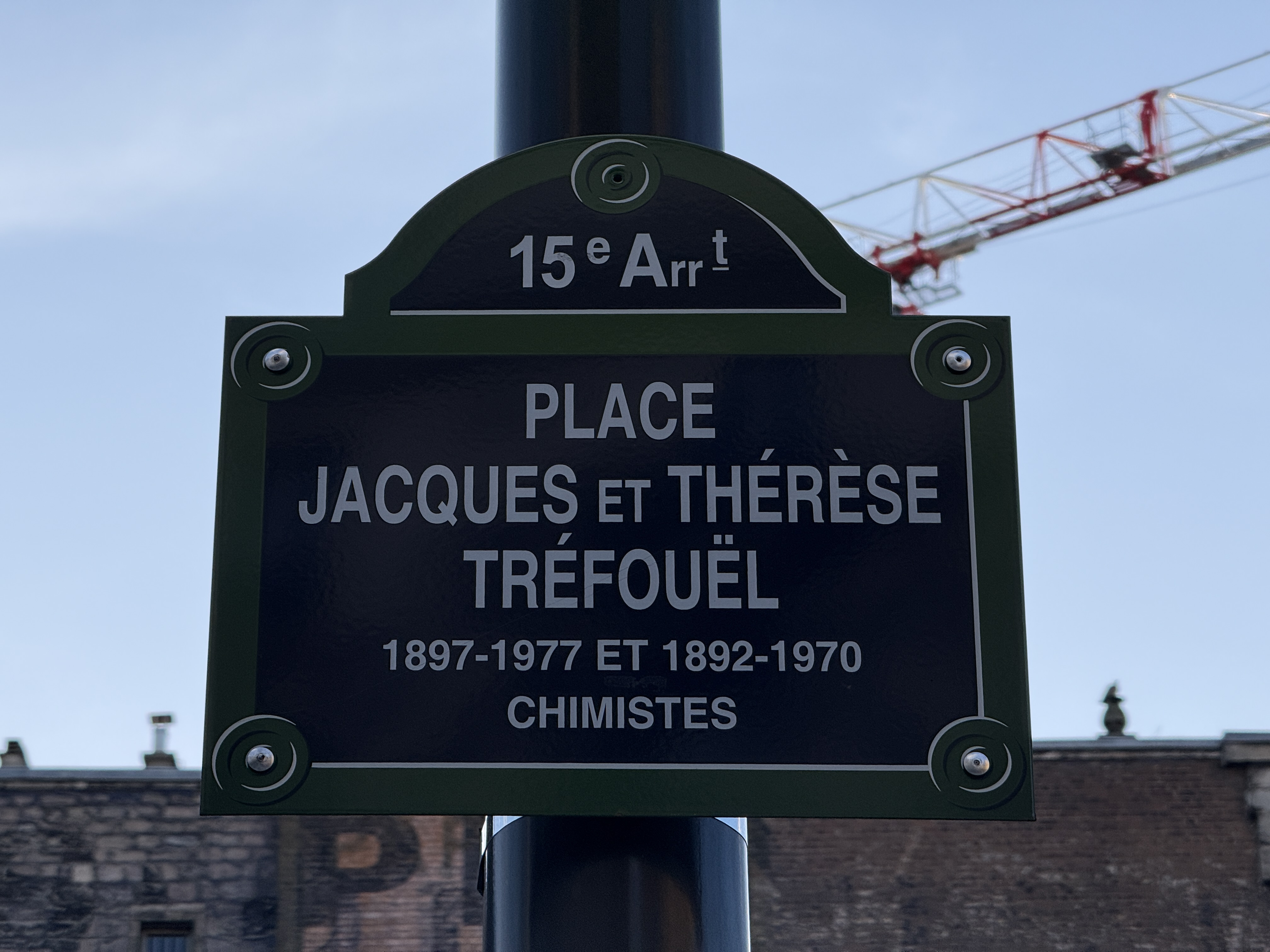
Street sign at Place Jacques et Thérèse Tréfouël - 15th arrondissement of Paris

In the early 1920s, Thérèse and her husband worked at the Pasteur Institute, in the laboratory of Ernest Fourneau, known as the father of medicinal chemistry. By studying derivatives of arsenic, they created drugs that could be used against syphilis (Stovarsol), African trypanosomiasis (Orsanine, moranyl), and malaria (Rodoquine). Stovarsol and Orsanine are both isomers of acetylaminohydroxyphenylarsonic acid. These chemical compounds were the first demonstration that isomers of the same molecule could have such different and specific properties.

They are best known for their 1935 co-discovery, together with the pharmacologist Daniel Bovet and the bacteriologist Frederico Nitti, of sulfanilamide, a novel antibiotic. Based on the team's research on the metabolism of prontosil, the discovery subsequently led to the production of a multitude of effective derivatives resulting from the addition of substituents to the amine attached to the SO2 group in sulfanilimide.

In 1938, Jacques started his own laboratory at the Pasteur Institute. In 1940, Jacques was appointed as director of the institute, at which point Tréfouël took over the management of the laboratory. After the Second World War, the Tréfouëls continued their research into sulfamides. In 1954, they established the use of diaminodiphenyl sulfone for the treatment of leprosy and tuberculosis. Thérèse officially became the head of the laboratory in 1955, while Jacques served as the director of the Institute for a total of 24 years.

Thérèse retired in 1963, and died in 1978, a year after her husband.

== Honours and awards ==
The Tréfouëls received several awards for their medical compounds, including the Prix Parkin from the Institut de France (1927), the Prix Louis (1932) and the Prix Paultre (1932) from the Académie de Médecine. The Tréfouëls were nominated for a Nobel Prize in Chemistry in 1950 by Pauline Ramart. In 1955, they were nominated for the Prix du Conseil National de l'Ordre des Pharmaciens, for their lifetime achievements in medicinal chemistry.

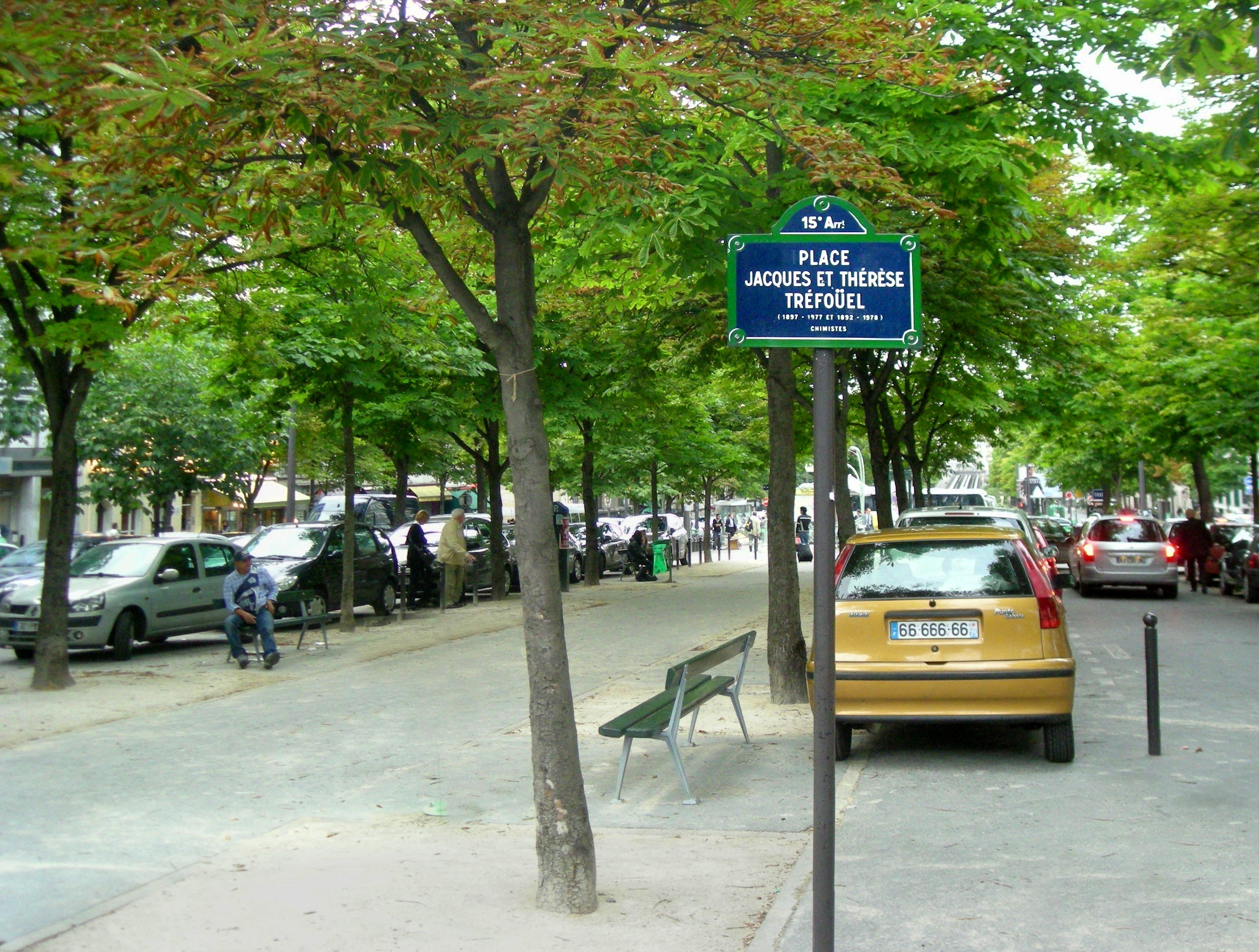
The Jacques and Thérèse Tréfouël Square in Paris (15e Arr.)

The Jacques and Thérèse Tréfouël Square in Paris was named after Tréfouëls.

In 2026, Tréfouël was announced as one of 72 historical women in STEM whose names have been proposed to be added to the 72 men already celebrated on the Eiffel Tower. The plan was announced by the Mayor of Paris, Anne Hidalgo following the recommendations of a committee led by Isabelle Vauglin of Femmes et Sciences and Jean-François Martins, representing the operating company which runs the Eiffel Tower.

== Bibliography ==
- Traité de chimie organique / T. 22, Méthodes générales utilisées en chimie industrielle organique, grandes synthèses, matières colorantes, tanins et tannage, hauts polymères synthétiques, chimie du caoutchouc naturel, savons et produits similaires, parfumerie, industries de fermentation, chimiothérapie (1953)
