= Sulfabenzamide =

Chemical compound

Clinical data
- Routes of administration: Topical

Identifiers
- IUPAC name: 4-Amino-N-benzoyl-benzenesulfonamide
- CAS Number: 127-71-9
- ChemSpider: 5128
- UNII: G58F8OPL4I
- ChEMBL: ChEMBL1243
- CompTox Dashboard (EPA): DTXSID7045287
- ECHA InfoCard: 100.004.419

Chemical and physical data
- Formula: C_{13}H_{12}N_{2}O_{3}S
- Molar mass: 276.31 g·mol^{−1}
- 3D model (JSmol): Interactive image
- SMILES: Nc1ccc(cc1)S(=O)(=O)NC(=O)c2ccccc2
- InChI: InChI=InChI=1S/C13H12N2O3S/c14-11-6-8-12(9-7-11)19(17,18)15-13(16)10-4-2-1-3-5-10/h1-9H,14H2,(H,15,16); Key:PBCZLFBEBARBBI-UHFFFAOYSA-N

Sulfabenzamide is an antibacterial/antimicrobial. Often used in conjunction with sulfathiazole and sulfacetamide (trade name – Sultrin) as a topical, intravaginal antibacterial preparation.
