= Jacques Tréfouël =

French chemist (1897–1977)

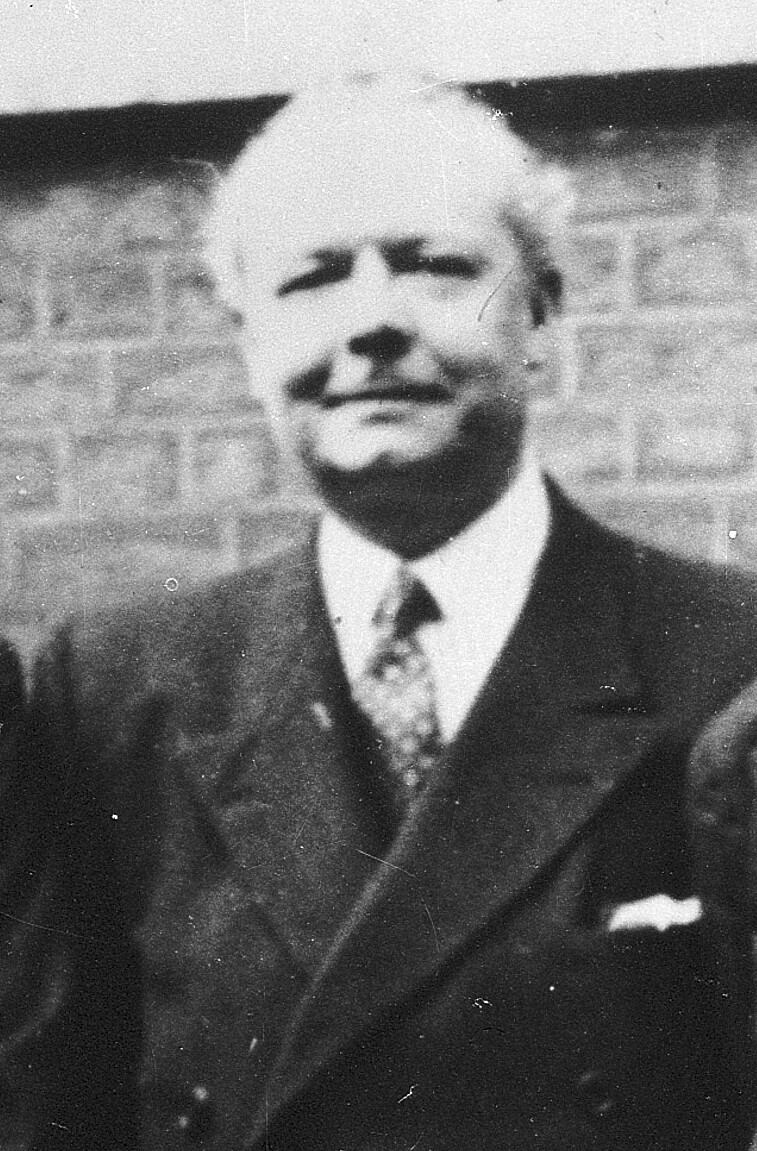
- Born: November 9, 1897; Le Raincy
- Died: July 11, 1977 (aged 79); Paris
- Occupation: Medical chemist
- Spouse: Thérèse Tréfouël (married 1921-1977)

Jacques Tréfouël (9 November 1897, Le Raincy – 11 July 1977, Paris) was a French medical chemist. He collaborated closely with his wife, Thérèse Tréfouël, including on the discovery of sulfanilamide.

== Biography ==
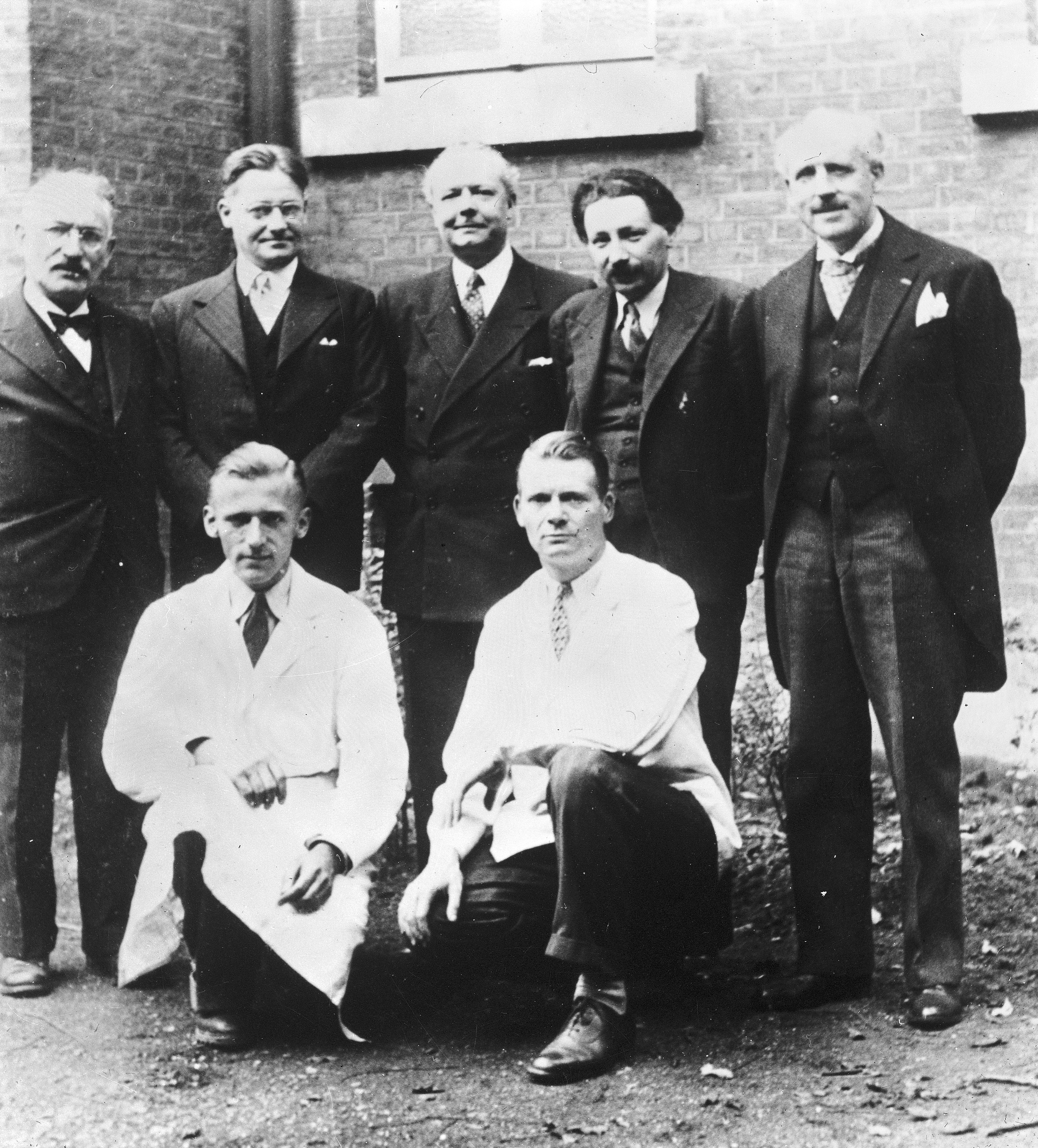

From 1920 to 1928 he worked as an assistant to Ernest Fourneau in the laboratory of medicinal chemistry at the Pasteur Institute. For the next ten years, he served as laboratory chief at the Institute, during which time, he was involved in the synthesis and development of drugs such as stovarsol, orsanine, and rhodoquine. In 1935, in collaboration with his wife, chemist Thérèse Tréfouël, and pharmacologists Daniel Bovet and Federico Nitti, he conducted research of prontosil, of which, they demonstrated that only a portion of the substance, named sulphanilamide, was active against streptococcus. The group also showed sulphanilamide's effective action against other types of bacteria (meningococcus, pneumococcus, gonococcus, Friedlander's bacillus, etc.).

In 1938 he was appointed head of the medicinal chemistry laboratory at the Pasteur Institute. From 1940 to 1964 he served as director of the Institute, while still retaining his role as head of the medicinal chemistry laboratory.

He was a member of the Société de pathologie exotique (from 1927), Société Philomathique de Paris (from 1933), and from 1971 to 1977, served as president of the Société de biologie. He was also a member of the Académie de médecine (president 1967) and the Académie des sciences (president 1965).

== Selected works ==
- Contribution à la chimiothérapie du paludisme. Essais sur la maladie des canaris (with E. Fourneau and T. Tréfouël), 1930 in: Annales de l’Institut Pasteur – Contributuion to the chemotherapy for malaria.
- Action antistreptococcique des dérivés sulfurés organiques (with E. Fourneau, T. Tréfouël, F. Nitti and D. Bovet), 1937 – Anti-streptococcal action of organic sulfur derivatives.
- Le Sulfamide et ses dérivés : chimie, biologie, pharmacologie, 1941 – Sulfamide and its derivatives: chemistry, biology, pharmacology.
- Titres et travaux scientifiques de Jacques Tréfouël, 1942 – Titles and scientific work of Jacques Tréfouël.
- Relations entre structure et propriétés thérapeutiques des dérivés organiques de l'arsenic pentavalent, 1942 – Relationship between the structure and therapeutic properties of organic derivatives of pentavalent arsenic.
- Techniques de laboratoire : chimie physique, chimie biologique, chimie clinique, 1947 – Laboratory techniques: physical chemistry, organic chemistry, clinical chemistry.
