= May & Baker =

British chemical company

May & Baker was a British chemical company founded by John May and William Gerrard Baker in Wandsworth, London in 1839. They initially specialized in the manufacture of chemicals derived from mercury and bismuth. Over the years they diversified into other chemical fields including photographic chemicals, pharmaceuticals, agrochemicals, and chemicals for research and development.

The company was bought by Établissements Poulenc Frères (later to become Société des Usines Chimiques Rhône-Poulenc) in 1922, and subsequently moved to Dagenham, Essex, although it continued to trade under the May & Baker name.

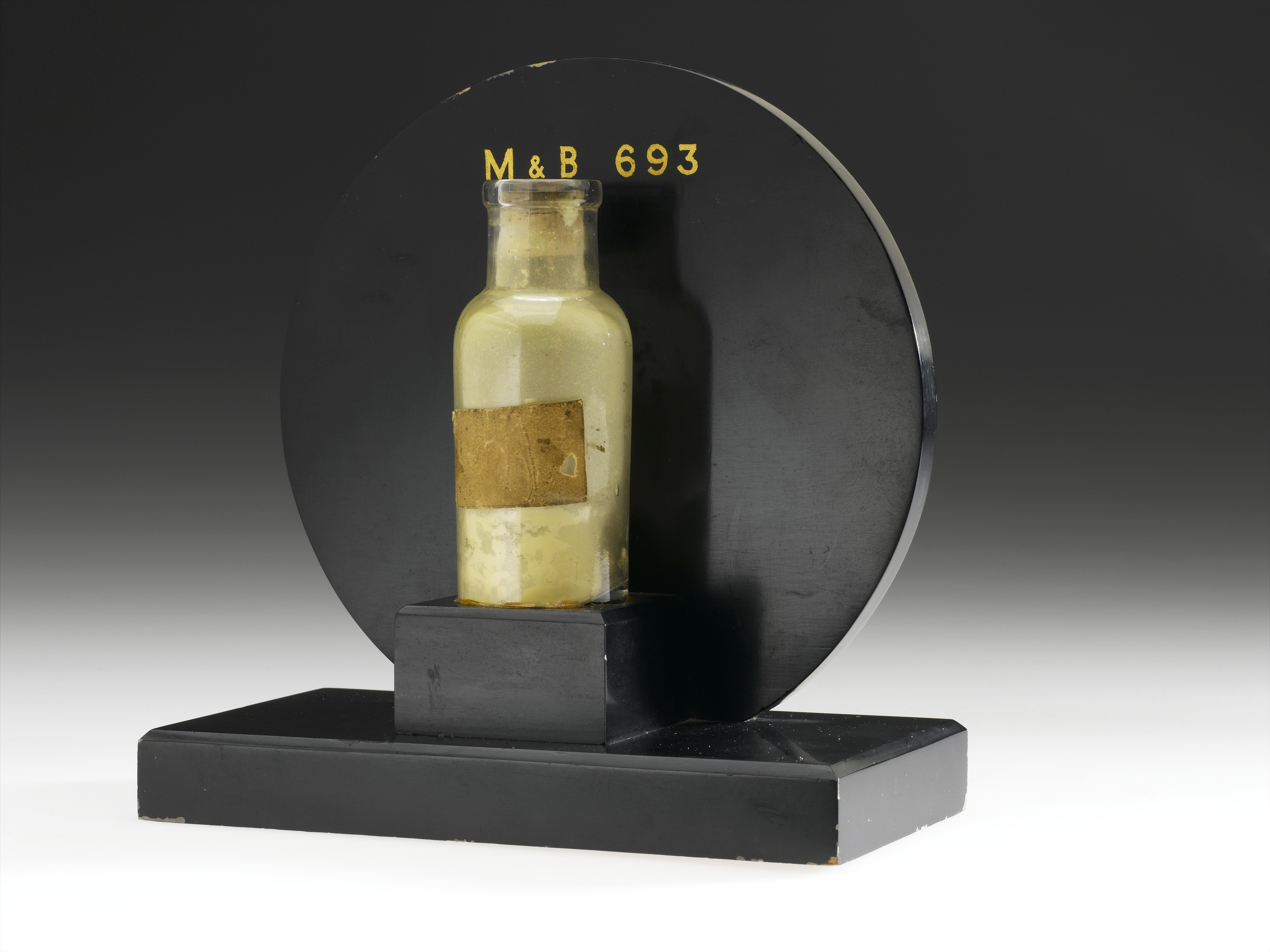
Laboratory sample of M&B 693. Credit: Wellcome Collection

During this time May & Baker branched into pharmaceuticals, with one of their major discoveries being sulphapyridine (M&B 693), first synthesised in 1937 by research chemist Montague Phillips, working under the direction of Arthur Ewins. This compound, May & Baker's most famous product, was one of the first generation of sulfonamide antibiotics. During WW2, M&B 693 saved many thousands of lives, including Sir Winston Churchill who was treated with it for pneumonia infections twice during the war. In a subsequent wartime radio broadcast on 29 December 1943, he said: "This admirable M&B, from which I did not suffer any inconvenience, was used at the earliest moment; and after a week's fever, the intruders were repulsed." The 693 numeric still features on the badge of May & Baker FC.

Post-war, May & Baker expanded into many countries round the world, particularly those in the Commonwealth, and comprised three divisions, Pharmaceuticals, Fine Chemicals and Agrochemicals. The 1960s were a boom time for the company, unofficially known as 'the Brittox Years' after one of its world-leading agrochemicals. There were agrochemical manufacturing sites in Sweet Briar Road, Norwich, Barton Moss in Manchester and Belvedere in Kent, a research station at Ongar in Essex and a head office at Regent House in nearby Brentwood.

The Agrochemical Division also contained Environmental Products (amenity horticulture) and Garden Care (retail), the latter being sold to Pan Britannica Industries (Sumitomo Group) in 1991. A subsidiary, Hortichem, was based in Ongar.

In 1986, a survey of the river bed sediments of the River Yare, near Norwich, Norfolk was undertaken by Imperial College, London, and showed significant pollution by mercury and copper with lesser amounts of cadmium, lead and zinc present. The pollution was traced to the May and Baker factory at Sweet Briar Road.

In 1990 the company came under the direct supervision of Rhone-Poulenc, which later merged with Rorer, an American pharmaceutical company, to form Rhone-Poulenc Rorer.

In 1999 the company was split — the Dagenham site (now just pharmaceuticals), merged with Hoechst and changed the company name to Aventis, removing R&D from the site in July 2000. The Norwich site became part of Bayer Agrochemicals. The Nigerian subsidiary, bought out in 2002, remains as May & Baker Nigeria plc.

Later on, a further merger with Sanofi-Synthélabo in 2004 changed the Dagenham site owner to Sanofi-Aventis. In 2009 Sanofi-Aventis announced their intention to close the Dagenham plant by 2013. Sanofi's plans to turn the former site into a state-of-the-art science park were put in doubt by a lack of funding from London mayor Boris Johnson's Growth Fund. The Dagenham site is now occupied by the London East Business and Technical Park.

== Club ==
The original works club, The May & Baker Club, used the original M&B logo made using the old symbol for Mercury, surmounted with a five-pointed star. They also hosted a football club of the same name. The club closed on Monday 3 February 2025, the linked news article includes more details on the club and its facilities.
