= Gerhard Domagk =

German bacteriologist (1895–1964)

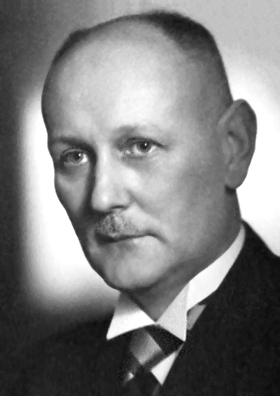
- Born: Gerhard Johannes Paul Domagk; 30 October 1895; Lagow, Brandenburg, Kingdom of Prussia, German Empire (now Łagów, Świebodzin County, Lubusz Voivodeship, Poland)
- Died: 24 April 1964 (aged 68); Burgberg, Baden-Württemberg, West Germany
- Education: University of Kiel
- Known for: Discovery of sulfonamides such as Prontosil as antibiotics
- Spouse: Gertrud Strube
- Children: One daughter and three sons
- Awards: Cameron Prize for Therapeutics of the University of Edinburgh (1939); Nobel Prize in Medicine (1939); Paul Ehrlich and Ludwig Darmstaedter Prize (1956); Fellow of the Royal Society (1959)
- Scientific career
- Fields: Bacteriology

Gerhard Johannes Paul Domagk (German pronunciation: [ˈɡeːɐ̯haʁt ˈdoːmak]; 30 October 1895 – 24 April 1964) was a German pathologist and bacteriologist.

He is credited with the discovery of sulfonamidochrysoidine (KL730) as an antibiotic for which he received the 1939 Nobel Prize in Physiology or Medicine. The drug became the first commercially available antibiotic and marketed under the brand name Prontosil.

While working in the pathology department of the University of Münster, Domagk was invited to join the IG Farben branch at Elberfeld (later Wuppertal) in 1927. His duty was to test chemical compounds prepared at the IG Farben laboratory for potential drugs. A novel compound synthesised by Fritz Mietzsch and Joseph Klarer, a benzene derivative of azo dye attached with sulphonamide group as a side chain was found to have antibacterial activity against human bacterium Streptococcus pyogenes. In 1935, Domagk's only daughter, Hildegarde, injured herself and contracted a streptococcal infection. In a desperate attempt to save his daughter's arm from amputation and her life, Domagk used the new compound that eventually cured the infection. Given the brand name Prontosil, the new drug became the first antibiotic commercially available for bacterial infections.

Domagk was chosen to receive the 1939 Nobel Prize in Physiology or Medicine "for the discovery of the antibacterial effects of prontosil," but the Nazi government prohibited him from receiving the award. In 1947, after the fall of Nazi Germany, he was officially given the Nobel diploma and delivered the Nobel lecture.

== Biography ==
Domagk was born in Lagow, Brandenburg, German Empire (now Poland). His father Paul Richard Domagk was a school teacher. He had an elder brother Erich, who died in childhood, and a younger sister, Charlotte. When he was five, in 1900, his father was transferred to Sommerfeld (now Lubsko, Poland). He immediately entered the Bismarck School where he completed elementary education in 1910. Then, he attended Herzog-Heinrich School in Liegnitz where he completed secondary education in 1914.

Domagk entered the University of Kiel in 1914 to study medicine. As the First World War broke out, the university was closed and he returned to Sommerfeld. He joined the German Grenadier Regimen 7 as a volunteer along with 15 of his old school friends. In his first experience of war at Flanders in October 1914, he barely escaped death where 11 of his school friends were killed. He was transferred to eastern front in Poland in December 1914, where he was shot on the head. He was transported to Lichterfelde near Berlin where he recovered from the injury. There he was given a training as medical orderly. In May 1915, he rejoined the eastern front as a medic. He recalled the horrors and suffering, especially of infections, at the battlefields, saying "There horrible impressions kept pursuing me during my whole life, and made me think how I could take measures against bacteria... I then swore, in case I would return to my home alive, to work and work to make a small contribution to solve that problem."

As the war ended in November 1918, Domagk resumed his medical course at Kiel. His doctoral thesis titled Beeinflussung der Kreatininausscheidung durch Muskelarbeit (Influence of Creatinine Excretion in the Urine through Muscular Activity) was supervised by Max Buerger and with that he earned his degree in 1921. Between 1922 and 1923, he worked as an assistant to Georg Hoppe-Seyler at Kiel.

In 1923, he met Walter Gross, the Director of the Institute of Pathology at the University of Greifswald, at the conference of German Society of Pathology in Leipzig. Gross was impressed with him and appointed him a junior doctor at Greifswald. He supported Domagk's research on phagocytosis, an immune process discovered by Russian zoologist Elie Metchnikoff, so far as permitting excessive use of electricity, constant photographic lights, and free roaming of experimental mice, all of which angered the janitor. Domagk's thesis "Destroying infectious diseases through the reticuloendothelium and the development of amyloid", published in 1924 in Virchows Archiv für pathologische Anatomie und Physiologie und für klinische Medizin (now Virchows Archiv) was assessed as a worthy criterion for promotion to a full professor. However, Gross was appointed to the University of Münster, and he invited Domagk to join him as a lecturer at his proposed Department of Experimental Pathology.

In 1925, he married Gertrude Strube, at the time an advisor to the German Chamber of Commerce in Basel. Later they had three sons and a daughter.

At Münster, Domagk felt that the new department was not flourishing as he anticipated and was underpaid. The IG Farben branch at Elberfeld (later Wuppertal) noticed him and offered him to lead their institute of experimental pathology. When he informed of this opportunity to his university authority in July 1927, and that he would stay if at least he was given a position of associate professor; he never received a response. He took a sabbatical leave for two years without pay, and decided to accept IG Farben's offer in 1929. However, another source states that he joined the IG Farben in 1927.

Domagk was appointed director of the Institute of Pathology and Bacteriology, started working at the IG Farben laboratories at Wuppertal where he continued the studies of Josef Klarer and Fritz Mietzsch, based on works by Paul Ehrlich, to use dyes, at that time a major product of the company, as antibiotics. He changed his focus to tuberculosis and chemotherapy. He remained in that position until his retirement in 1961.

Along with Albert Einstein, Domagk was one of the sponsors of the Peoples' World Convention (PWC), also known as Peoples' World Constituent Assembly (PWCA), which took place in 1950-51 at Palais Electoral, Geneva, Switzerland.

Domagk died from a heart attack at his villa in the Black Forest village of Burgberg near Königsfeld, Schwarzwald.

== Achievements ==
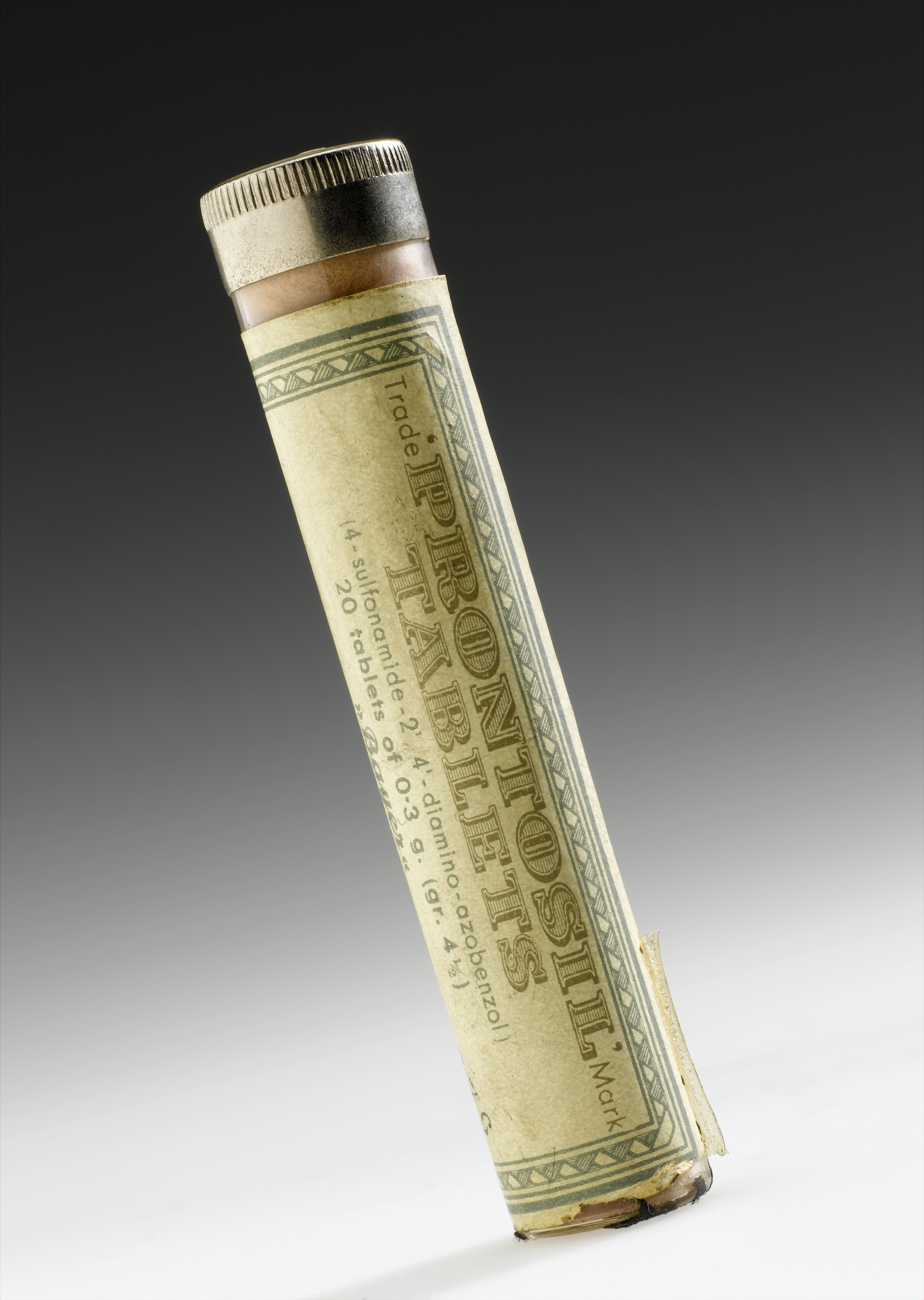
Tube of Prontosil tablets available in Germany during 1935–1950

=== Prontosil ===
Domagk's responsibility at IG Farben was to test the new compounds, chemical dyes, for antimicrobial activities. Werner Schulemann, Friedrich Mietzsch, Hans Mauss and Joseph Klarer were largely responsible for providing a continuous supply of chemicals to be screened. Since the end of the 19th century, azo dyes, developed and used for colouring textile and other materials, were found to have medicinal properties against infections. For example, German biologist Paul Ehrlich used methylene blue, a type of azo dye, to kill malarial parasites in experimental animals, and cured two persons from malaria in 1891. Later, Ehrlich and his students found that some azo dyes were effective against African sleeping sickness. In 1913, P. Eisenberg discovered that another azo dye, chrysoidine could kill bacteria and could be used as a disinfectant. Following such leads, IG Farben devoted to studying and chemically modifying azo dyes for potential medicines.

==== Development ====
In early 1930s, Mietzsch and Klarer synthesised a benzene derivative of azo dye, which was chemically related to (an analogue of) chrysoidine. The compound had an addition of sulphonamide group as a side chain, thus becoming sulfamidochrysoidine. They suspected that a unique chemical component of sulphonamide group in the new dye could be a possible drug candidate; as Mietzsch predicted: "[The sulphonamide parts were] the right substituents in the right positions on the azo group." The compound was then labelled KL730 (KL for Klarer). IG Farben received a German patent for the new compound in 1932.

The exact date of synthesis is unknown. An account that the IG Farben leader Heinrich Hörlein suggested the use of sulfur group to azo dyes "some time in 1932" may not be true, as IG Farben received the patent of the first modified sulfamidochrysoidine on 7 November 1931. The other related compound received patent in December 1932. Initial experiments in 1931 indicated poor antibacterial effect against bacterial cultures. It was not known at the time that the active component of Prontosil was the sulphonamide and not the azo group, as they expected. In addition, the sulphonamides by themselves were not antibacterials, but only became active drug after metabolism inside the body. This is why the first tests (in vitro) on bacterial cultures failed.

==== Discovery of antibacterial activity ====
In early 1931, Domagk immediately tested the compound in mice that were having bacterial infection, and found that it was effective against Gram-positive bacteria. He designated a code for the compound D 4145 (D for Domagk). He induced infection at the belly (peritonitis) of mice using clinical specimens (isolates) of Streptococcus pyogenes. In the first experiment, he infected 26 mice by injecting the bacteria, and he injected a single dose of Prontosil to 12 of the infected mice, while the rest 14 were simply kept infected (as controls) without Prontosil treatment. All the Prontosil-injected mice survived, meaning they were cured of the streptococcal infection, whereas the untreated 14 mice all died by the fourth day of experiment. There were several more experimental tests, and a clinical trial in which a boy was cured of streptococcal infection in 1933. In February 1935, Domagk reported his experiments in the journal Deutsche Medizinische Wochenschrift as "Ein Beitrag zur Chemotherapie der bakteriellen Infektionen" ("A contribution to the chemotherapy of bacterial infections").

At the time, there was no medical cure for streptococcal infection, and infected body parts had to be surgically removed to prevent further spread of the infection. This is still in practice when the infection had caused severe tissue damage even after antibiotics are available. In a notable incidence, Domagk's six-year-old daughter, Hildegarde, injured herself with a stitching needle while making Christmas decorations on 4 December 1935. She fell on the stairs and stabbed her hand with the needle, and the broken needle was stuck in her wrist. The needle was removed at a hospital. However, she developed severe inflammation and fever from the next day. As Domagk recounted:

When the dressing was changed a few days later there was marked swelling of the hand, and despite removal of all the stitches the fever continued to rise rapidly. In spite of numerous incisions the inflammation phlegmon extended to the under-arm. A serious worsening of the general condition and dizziness occurred, so that we were gravely worried about the child. Since further surgical intervention was not possible, I asked permission of the treating surgeon to use Prontosil, after I had established by culture that streptococci were the cause of the illness.

After making 14 incisions, the physician suggested that the only way to save Hildegarde was amputation of the arm. However, Hildegarde recovered following the Prontosil treatment and her arm was saved.

By 1935, Mietzsch and Klarer had prepared two forms of the compound, one is poorly soluble in water while the other is highly soluble. The water-soluble compound was given a name Streptozon (specifically Streptozon S, for the soluble sodium salt) after the bacterium with which it was originally experimented, and the less water-soluble was called Prontosil (specifically Prontosil rubrum). Prontosil was used as the common name for both and the brand name of the drug after 1935. Domagk had used only the Streptozon type. He reported the development of the drug and his human application in the article "Chemotherapie der streptokokken-infektionen" ("Chemotherapy of streptococcus infection") in the October issue of Klinische Wochenschrift (later Journal of Molecular Medicine).

==== Confirmation ====
The first independent research was done by English physician Leonard Colebrook at the Queen Charlotte's Maternity Hospital in London. Immediately after reading Domagk's paper, in 1935, Colebrook repeated the experiments on mice using both soluble Streptozon and the less soluble form and found that Streptozon was more effective but only in specific bacteria that caused puerperal fever. However, he found a serious side effect that the surviving mice developed severe kidney damages. This discouraged him from human clinical trials, but he encountered one woman who was terminally ill from puerperal fever. Without other options of treatment, he gave the Streptozon that cured the woman in a couple of days. He tested the drug again on another woman with the same result, to which he remarked: "Almost at once there was a surprising and most gratifying change." With Méave Kenny, he treated 64 women and reported the experiments and clinical trials in 1936. The medical application was soon supported by other clinical cases and Prontosil became the major antibiotic for the next decade.

Sulfonamides had revolutionary antibacterial effectiveness for their time, surpassing phage therapy, but were later replaced by penicillin, which showed both better effects and fewer side effects (sulfonamides can cause kidney stones and changes in bone marrow). However, Domagk's work on sulfonamides eventually led to the development of the antituberculosis drugs thiosemicarbazone and isoniazid, which helped to curb the epidemic of tuberculosis which swept Europe after World War II. Although Prontosil lost its popularity after the 1960s, its derivatives are continued to be used in several bacterial and viral infections, especially in the treatments of burns and urinary tract infections.

=== Zephirol ===
In 1932, Domagk discovered the potential use of benzyldimethyldodecylammonium chloride as a powerful antimicrobial agent. After a series of tests with different bacteria, he published in 1935 as a disinfectant, naming it Zephirol. Domagk explained how Zephirol applied to the skin, such as before wearing gloves during surgery, could prevent infection. It led to a successful marketing as a common disinfectant. This was the discovery of quats, chemicals that are later used in a variety of consumer applications including as general antimicrobials (such as detergents and disinfectants), fabric softeners, and hair conditioners.

=== Cancer therapy ===
Since 1936, Domagk also focussed on cancer treatment. In 1956, he reported the successful development of an anticancer drug which he designated E-39 (E for ethylenimine quinones). He showed that the compound could destroy cancer cells such as Yoshida sarcoma, Ehrlich carcinoma and Crocker sarcoma of mice and the Walker carcinoma of rats. He was aware that precision drugs would be required to target specific cancers, as he remarked:

In therapy we will have to be satisfied, for the present at least, with a certain equilibrium between body cell and tumorous cell, even if the tumor cannot be completely eliminated. We will be satisfied if we can slow down it growth, in order to preserve the life of a patient longer and under bearable conditions.

Although the drug did not find way into prescription treatment of cancer, it was continued to be investigated and several related compounds are still under experimental studies.

== Nobel Prize and issues ==
In 1939, Domagk was selected by the Nobel Foundation to receive the Nobel Prize in Physiology or Medicine for the discovery of Prontosil as an antibiotic, the first commercially available drug effective against bacterial infections. However, the Nazi government banned him from attending the award ceremony. This was because Carl von Ossietzky, an outspoken anti-Nazi pacifist, had won the Nobel Peace Prize in 1935, which had angered the Nazi German government. Ossietzky was imprisoned and died in a concentration camp. In 1937 Adolf Hitler made an official decree that prohibited German nationals from accepting Nobel Prizes.

On 27 October 1939, Domagk received a telegram from the rector of the Karolinska Institute in Stockholm that he was to receive the Nobel Prize. He informed the rector of the University of Münster, Walter Mevius, who immediately submitted a petition to the German authorities to allow Domagk to receive the award. Domagk himself wrote to the NSDAP Office of the Führer, Hitler's headquarters, that should he be allowed to receive the award, he would donate 100,000 Deutsche Marks for the war cause. On 17 November, he was arrested by the Gestapo who detained him for a week. He was released when he was verified that he supported the German National Socialism and was politically loyal. However, he was informed to communicate with Karolinska Institute only through the government departments such as the Ministry of Education or Foreign Office, and forced to decline the award. It was officially announced in Berlin that Domagk had "rather regretfully declined" the award.

Two years after the end of World War II and the Nazi regime, the Nobel Foundation gave the Nobel medallion and a diploma to Domagk in 1947. However, the monetary prize was not given as it was already returned to the foundation.

== Awards and honours ==
Domagk was awarded the 1939 Nobel Prize in Physiology or Medicine. In the same year, Domagk was also awarded the Cameron Prize for Therapeutics of the University of Edinburgh. In 1941 Domagk was awarded the Medaglia Paterno (Rome) by the Kingdom of Italy and also the Von-Klebelsberg-Medal and Prize by the Kingdom of Hungary. He became a member of the German Academy of Sciences Leopoldina in 1942.

After the war, in 1947, Domagk was finally able to receive his Nobel Prize, but not the monetary portion of the prize due to the time that had elapsed. In 1951, he was one of seven Nobel Laureates who attended the 1st Lindau Nobel Laureate Meeting. He received the El Soleil del Perú in 1952, the Pour le mérite für Wissenschaften und Künste in 1952, the Spanish Civil de Sanidad in 1953, the del Lobertador from the Republic of Venezuela in 1957, the Medal of the Rising Sun 2nd Class from Japan in 1960, the Grand Cross with Star of the Order of Merit of the Federal Republic of Germany in 1955. In 1952, he was elected chairman of the German Society of Pathology.

Domagk became a Foreign Member of the Royal Society in 1959; his short biography was published by the Royal Society in 1964.

Domagkpark, a public park, and Domagkstraße, a road, in Munich are named after Domagk. In Münster, a research foundation called Krebsforschung Professor Dr. Gerhard Domagk (Cancer Research Professor Dr. Gerhard Domagk) was established in 1961, and Gerhard-Domagk-Institut für Pathologie (Gerhard Domagk Institute of Pathology) is created in the University of Münster.
