= Ernest Fourneau =

French scientist (1872–1949)

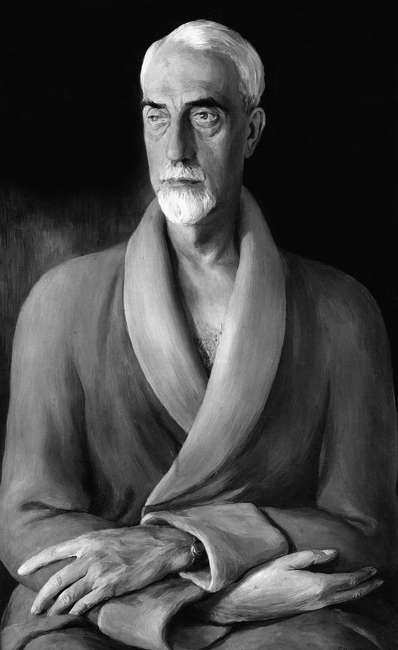
- Portrait of Ernest Fourneau by his son Jean-Claude Fourneau
- Born: 4 October 1872; Biarritz, France
- Died: 5 August 1949 (aged 76); Ascain, France
- Education: École de pharmacie de Paris
- Awards: Prix Jecker, of the Académie des Sciences (1919 and 1931)
- Scientific career
- Fields: Chemistry, Pharmacology
- Workplaces: Pasteur Institute
- Notable students: Thérèse Tréfouël, Jacques Tréfouël

Notes
- Son-in-law of Paul Segond; Brother-in-law of Marc Tiffeneau; Father of Jean-Claude Fourneau

Ernest Fourneau (4 October 1872 – 5 August 1949) was a French pharmacist who graduated in 1898 for the Paris university specialist in medicinal chemistry and pharmacology. He played a major role in the discovery of synthetic local anesthetics such as amylocaine, as well as in the synthesis of suramin. He authored more than two hundred scholarly works, and has been described as having "helped to establish the fundamental laws of chemotherapy that have saved so many human lives".

Fourneau was a pupil of Friedel and Moureu, and studied in the German laboratories of Ludwig Gattermann in Heidelberg, Hermann Emil Fischer in Berlin and Richard Willstätter in Munich. He headed the research laboratory of Poulenc Frères in Ivry-sur-Seine from 1903 to 1911. One of the products was a synthetic local anesthetic that was named Stovaine (amylocaine). This was a pun on the English translation of "fourneau" as "stove". (The same pun was used in the brand name of the drug acetarsol, Stovarsol.) Other important medicines were antipyretics. In 1910 Fourneau accepted the directorship of the Pasteur Institute's medical chemistry section, with the condition that he maintained his ties with Poulenc Frères. He recruited Germaine Benoit to work in the Institute as a new graduate.

He was a member of the Académie Nationale de Médecine.

== Bibliography ==
- Fourneau, Jean-Pierre (December 1987). "Ernest Fourneau, fondateur de la chimie thérapeutique française : Feuillets d'album". Revue d'histoire de la pharmacie (in French). 34 (275): 335–355. doi:10.3406/pharm.1987.2904. ISSN 0035-2349. PMID 11637580.
- Quirke, Viviane (2007). Collaboration in the Pharmaceutical Industry: Changing Relationschips in Britain and France, 1935-1965. Vol. 53. New York & London: Rougledge. pp. 54–70 and 173–177 mainly. ISBN 978-0-415-30982-0. PMC 2706064.

== Sources ==
- Lesch, John E. (2007), The First Miracle Drugs: How the Sulfa Drugs Transformed Medicine, Oxford University Press, ISBN 978-0-19-518775-5
- Michel, Jean-Marie (2016), "Les établissements Poulenc frères" (PDF), Contribution a l'histoire des polymers en France, Societé Chemique de France, archived from the original (PDF) on 2013-07-17
