= The Moon Stallion =

1978 British children's TV series

- Created by: Brian Hayles
- Directed by: Dorothea Brooking
- Starring: Sarah Sutton
- Country of origin: United Kingdom
- No. of series: 1
- No. of episodes: 6

Production
- Producer: Anna Home

Original release
- Network: BBC1
- Release: 1978 – 1978

The Moon Stallion is a British children's television serial made by the BBC in 1978 and written by Brian Hayles, who also authored its novelisation.

The series stars Sarah Sutton as Diana Purwell, a young blind girl who becomes embroiled in mystical intrigue set around the Berkshire and Wiltshire countryside.

== Plot ==
Set in the late Victorian era, the story tells of how the Purwell family travel to Wiltshire when the widowed father is contacted by Sir George Mortenhurze, local squire and a former cavalry officer, to seek out historical evidence of King Arthur. Professor Purwell takes his two children, Diana and Paul, with him.

Arriving at the railway station they are collected by the squire's groom, 'Todman', and driven by pony and trap to his estate. On the way they briefly encounter the Moon Stallion, a white horse living wild on the downs, whom Diana is aware of despite her being blind. It transpires that the horse is the mystical messenger of Epona, goddess of the Moon and horses; the horse is also connected to the story of Merlin.

Diana and Paul, with Estelle the daughter of Sir George, discover that Mortenhurze and Todman seek to capture the horse. Todman, who it turns out is a "horse warlock", desires the power it would offer him as consort to the moon goddess, while the squire blames the horse for his wife's death and seeks revenge.

== Cast ==
- James Greene as Professor Purwell
- Sarah Sutton as Diana Purwell
- David Pullan as Paul Purwell
- John Abineri as Sir George Mortenhurze
- Caroline Goodall as Estelle Mortenhurze (daughter of Sir John)
- David Haig as Todman
- Richard Viner as 'The Dark Rider'
- Michael Kilgarriff as The Green King

== Principal locations ==
- Uffington White Horse
- Wayland's Smithy

== Reception ==
The book The Ultimate Encyclopedia of Fantasy described The Moon Stallion as "an intriguing serial." It also stated that "Hayles' script was one of the most accomplished fantasies specifically written for television".

== Novelisation ==
Brian Hayles wrote a novelisation of The Moon Stallion in 1978; it was published by Mirror Books.

In 2015, Fantom Publishing republished Hayles' novelisation, along with novelisations of Children of the Stones, Raven and Sky.

== Adaptation ==
Tammy adapted The Moon Stallion as a comic strip in 1978; it was illustrated by Mario Capaldi.

== See also ==
- The Horseman's Word
- Toadman
