= European Veterinary Dental Foundation =

Foundation for Veterinary Dentistry

European Foundation for Veterinary Dentistry
- European Veterinary Dental Foundation
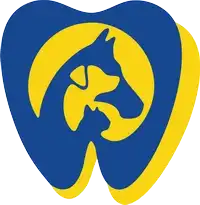
- Abbreviation: EVDF
- Predecessor: European Veterinary Dentistry Society
- Founded: 14 January 2025
- Region served: Europe
- Members: ▲350 (2025)
- Key people: Yves Debosschere (President); Elena-Carmen Nenciulescu (Secretary); James Haseler (Treasurer)
- Website: EVDF Site

European Veterinary Dental Foundation (EVDF), also known as the European Foundation for Veterinary Dentistry, is a charity operating in Europe that promotes research and education in Veterinary Dentistry.

EVDF's stated aim is "for the public benefit to advance the study and science of veterinary dental medicine in Europe through promoting the education and training of veterinarians and dentists in the field of orodental care for animals” as well as for “the advancement of education for the public benefit by the promotion of research into animal dental welfare in Europe and the dissemination of the useful results of such research".

== History ==
=== European Veterinary Dental Society ===
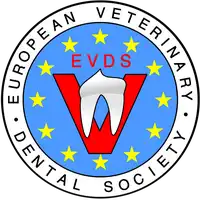

On 29 September 1992, a group a Veterinary Surgeons interested in starting a European Veterinary Dentistry group met in Rome, Italy. From this meeting, the European Veterinary Dental Society (EVDS) was created. The first president elected was Dr Karl Zetner.

On 6 October 1993, the EVDS held the first EVDS congress in Berlin, Germany.

=== European Veteriunary Dental College ===
Veterinary Dentistry continued to develop and in April 1998, the European Board of Veterinary Specialisation accepted the application for provisional recognition of the European Veterinary Dental College (EVDC) and the College held its first examinations in Ljubljana, Slovenia, in May that year. The inaugural meeting of the EVDC was held on May 14, 1998, at which stage there were twelve members.

=== European Veterinary Dental Foundation ===
EVDS continued running an annual congress, which was held in a different European country each year. The Congress was originally run by a local organising committee, which was assisted by the EVDS committee. Gradually, the EVDS committee took most of the responsibility of the congress, helped by the local committee. EVDC members also started to have more input into the congress. This led to a change of the congress from the EVDS congress to the European Veterinary Dental Forum on 7 June 2015.

By 2019, the EVDS had grown to over 200 members, with the congress attracting many more. The EVDS meetings were however, not well attended, which made it difficult to make important decisions without member approval.

Between 2020 and 2025, the committee worked to change the structure of the EVDS to one similar to the American Veterinary Dental Foundation. In 2023, the members at the AGM approved the move to a foundation, and on 14 January 2025, the foundation was formed.

== Activities ==
The society and dental college have published guidelines identifying core knowledge for all vets. Its official journal is the Journal of Veterinary Dentisty.
