= Equine malocclusion =

Equine physical deformity

Normal horse teeth.

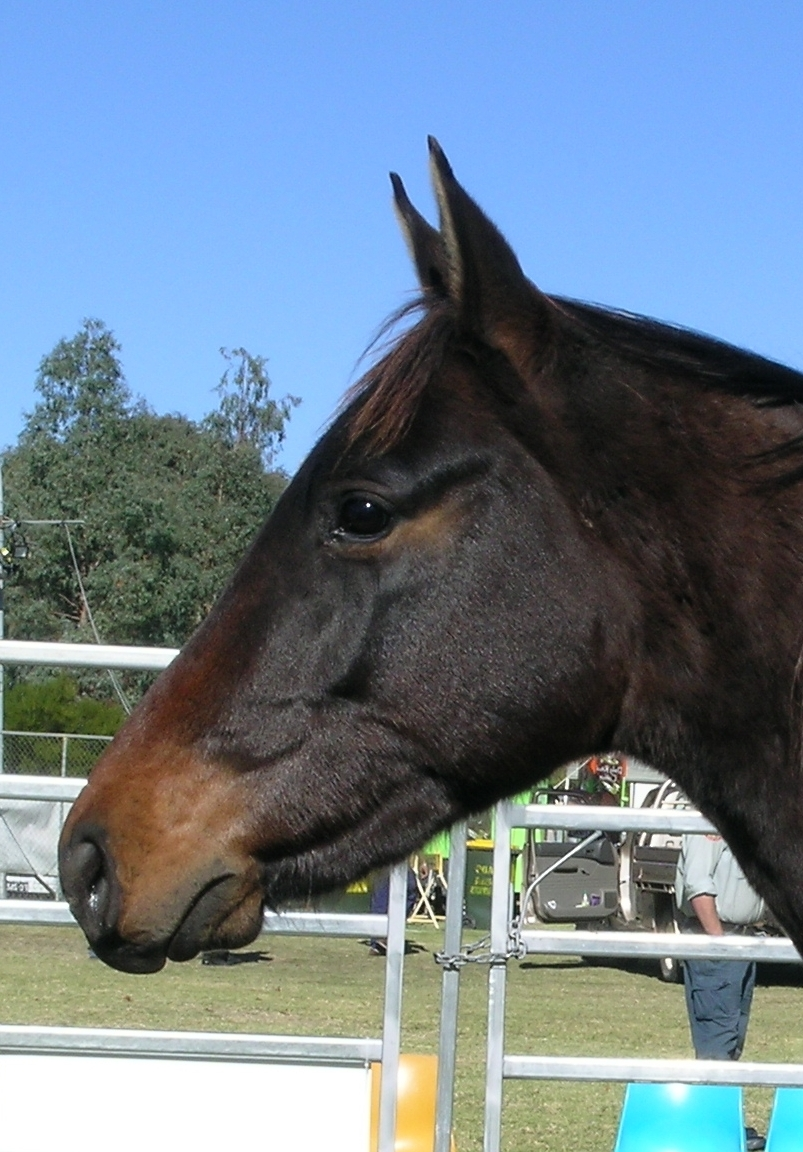
A young horse with a parrot mouth.

An equine malocclusion is a misalignment between the upper and lower jaws of a horse or other equine. It results in a faulty bite with the upper and lower teeth failing to meet correctly. Malocclusions can cause pain to the horse and may also lead to weight loss and other eating problems related to poor chewing or loss of appetite. In addition, discomfort can lead to poor behavior when the animal is ridden or driven, particularly if a bit is used in the horse's mouth.

== Equine dental malocclusions in the molars ==
=== Caudal hooks ===
A caudal hook is characterized by the posterior molar developing a growth which overhangs and “hooks” around the adjacent tooth. This diagram depicts a caudal hook on the lower last molar, however the upper last molar can also develop a caudal hook.

Caudal hooks are defined as when the dominant lower or upper last molar overhang the opposing molar. They can be hereditary and may result because a horse is born either parrot-mouthed or monkey-mouthed. They can also be caused secondary to another molar malocclusion that forces the jaw to disalign. This malocclusion results in problems for the horse when eating. It prevents the horse from chewing side to side freely which causes incorrect and excessive tooth wear. The soft tissues of the mouth can be damaged because the hooks are sharp and can cut them. Caudal hooks will also cause discomfort to the horse during riding. To fix caudal hooks, the dominant molar must be reduced, preventing extreme wear to the opposing molar, and rounded so that the soft tissue is not traumatized.

=== Rostral hooks ===
A rostral hook is characterized by the first premolar developing a growth that precedes the adjacent tooth. This diagram depicts a rostral hook of the upper first premolar, however a rostral hook can also affect the lower first premolar as well.

Rostral hooks occur when the dominant upper front premolars overhang the lower premolars. They can be hereditary or developmental meaning that the horse can have an overbite at birth or can have another malocclusion that forces the disalignment of the jaw. Rostral hooks can result in improper and extreme molar wear especially to the opposing lower premolar. Other problems include bit problems and soft tissue damage. Fixing Rostral hooks requires that you reduce the dominant portion of the upper premolar and round the unopposed portion smoothly towards the gum. Preventive maintenance is required to prevent recurring Rostral hooks.

=== Ramps ===
When there is excessive height to the lower premolars, the horse has a condition known as ramps. They occur when the upper from the premolar deciduous cap or baby tooth is kept resulting in the abnormal growth of the permanent premolar. The problem with ramps is that they prevent the horse from freely chewing side-to-side. This causes improper and over wear of the molars. It will also, along with an underbite, cause severe discomfort when a bit is placed in the horses mouth. To solve the problem, the dominant tooth must be reduced to allow the opposing one to recover.

=== Enamel points ===
Enamel points are sharp points that develop on the inside of the lower molars and outside of the upper molars. They occur over time as the horse stops chewing as far sideways. This makes the unopposed edge tooth get longer. When the edge tooth gets longer it forms razor sharp points. They cause pain to the horse because they irritate the soft tissue of the gums when the horse eats and when certain equipment is used in the mouth resulting in the tongue and cheeks being pulled into these points. To resolve this problem the points must be filed off.

=== Sheared molar table ===
A sheared molar table is the extreme angulation of the chewing surface of the molars. It is caused by a lack of side-to-side chewing. It is a very severe problem because the horse cannot chew sideways. This results in the horse not being able to break down its food properly leading to malnutrition. This malocclusion can be resolved by correcting the angle of the molar table.

=== Wave complexes ===
Wave complexes occur when the molar arcade develops an uneven surface with a wave-like appearance. It usually occurs in the pre-molars and molars. It generally occurs secondarily to other malocclusions. It results in prematurely worn out teeth, periodontal pocketing, decay, and tooth loss. It also prevents the horse from properly grinding its food as it makes side-to-side chewing difficult. A resolution for this problem is the reduction of the high complexes. This allows and encourages the horse to chew side-to-side.

=== Stepped molars ===
These occur when the molar arcade develops a stepped appearance. Its main cause is a missing tooth which allows the opposing teeth to grow into the gap, but it can occur because of uneven wear or if the deciduous cap or baby tooth is retained too long preventing normal tooth growth. It can prevent the horse from freely chewing and cause the improper wear of the molars and incisors. A solution is to reduce the high molar allowing proper chewing. Preventative maintenance must be used to stop this from happening again in the event that it was caused by a lost tooth.

=== Accentuated transverse ridges ===
These are enlarged ridges that run across the chewing surfaces of the molars. They can result from the disalignment of the jaw or the horse is not chewing in a proper sideways motion. They are caused when a hard spot on one tooth digs into and wears out a soft spot on another tooth. They interfere with normal chewing and cause excessive wear to the opposing molars. They can also result in periodontal disease and diastema. To resolve these you must reduce the enlarged ridges to let the opposing teeth recover and allow the horse to chew correctly.

=== Periodontal pockets ===
Periodontal pockets occur when gum disease makes pockets around the teeth. Food gets caught in these pockets and causes even more decay. The disease progresses as the horse is unable to chew properly. It can lead to infection, abscesses in the mouth, and tooth loss. It should be corrected as early as possible, and it is very difficult to stop. If the disease is caught early it can be prevented.

=== Diastema ===
Diastema is defined as a space between two adjoining teeth. Food can be trapped between teeth leading to severe periodontal disease and poor dental health overall. It is very difficult to correct. The unopposed overgrowth of the opposing teeth must be reduced.
