= Horse teeth =

Aspect of equine anatomy

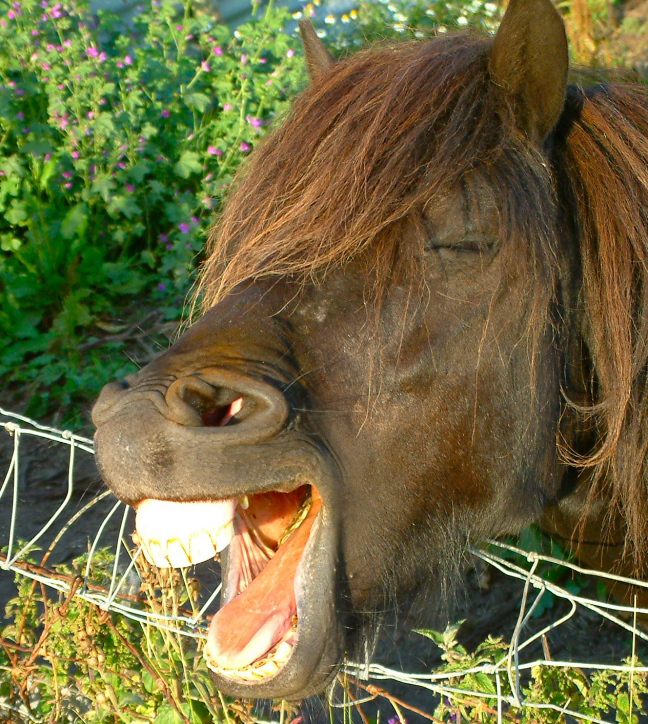
The equine dental arcade, showing the front incisors, the interdental space before the first premolars

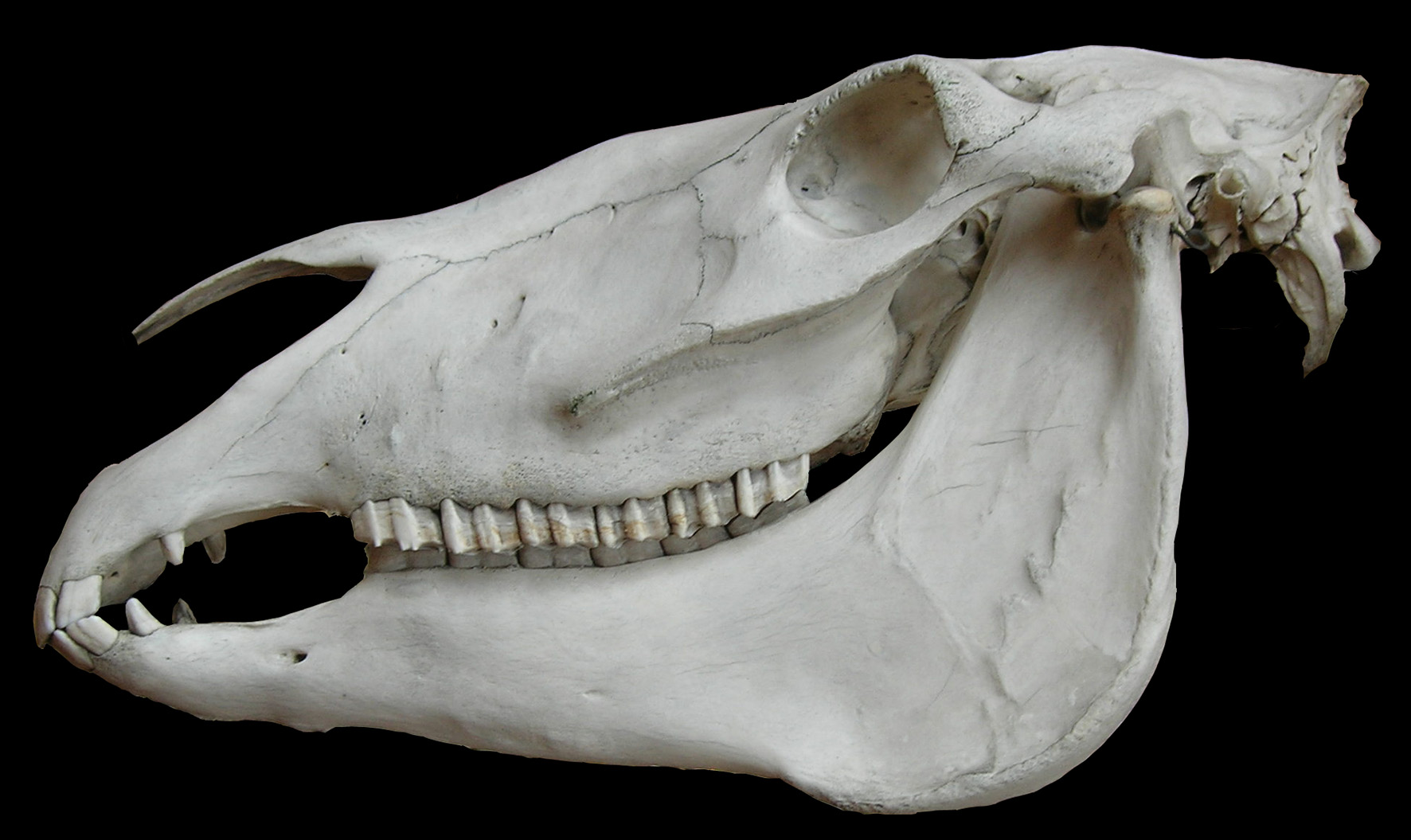
The skull of a horse

Horse teeth refers to the dentition of equine species, including horses and donkeys. Equines are both heterodontous and diphyodontous, which means that they have teeth in more than one shape (there are up to five shapes of tooth in a horse's mouth), and have two successive sets of teeth, the deciduous ("baby teeth") and permanent sets.

For grazing animals, good dentition is essential to survival. Continued grazing creates specific patterns of wear, which can be used along with patterns of eruption to estimate the age of the horse.

== Types of teeth ==
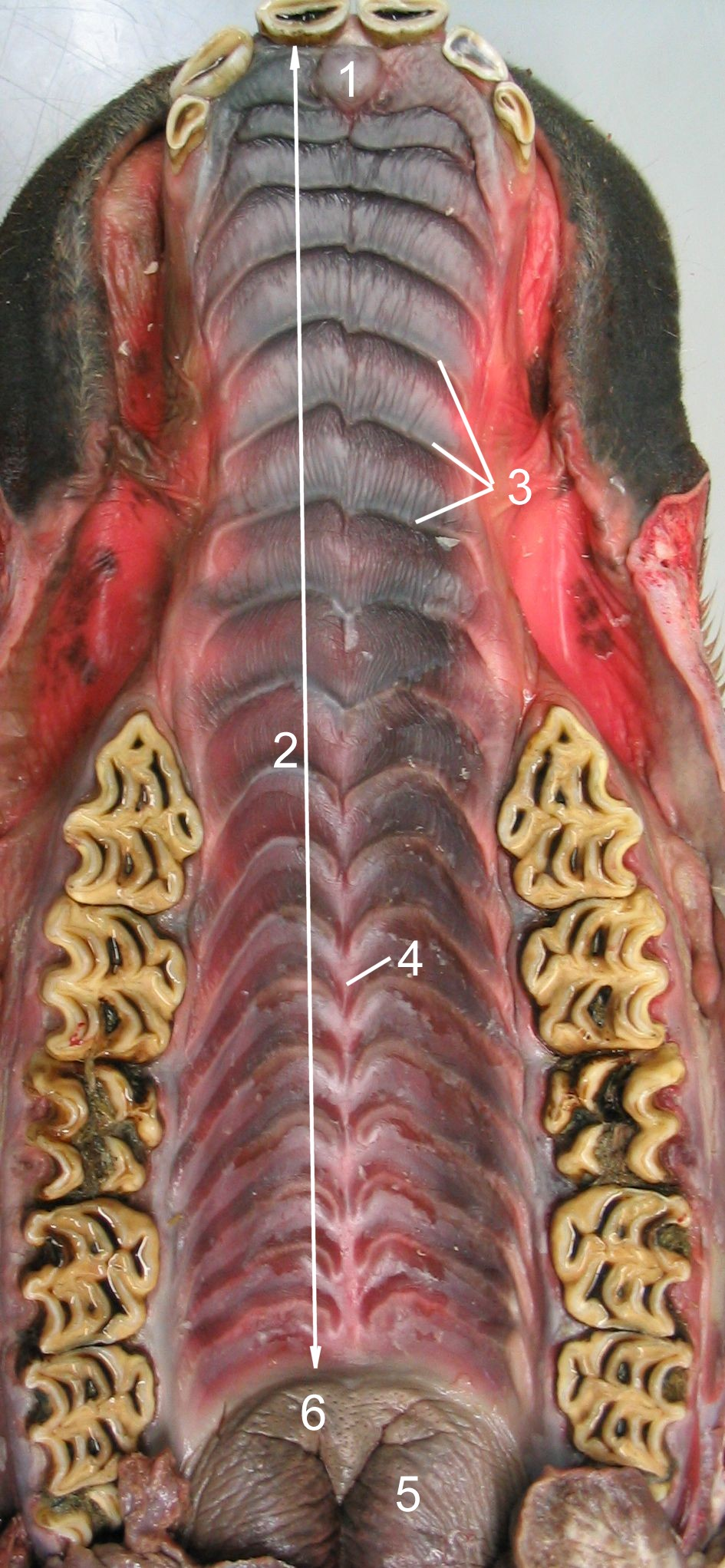
Upper half of an immature horse's mouth

A fully developed horse of around five years of age will have between 36 and 44 teeth. All equines are heterodontous, which means that they have different shaped teeth for different purposes. All horses have twelve incisors at the front of the mouth, used primarily for cutting food, most often grass, whilst grazing. They are also used as part of a horse's attack or defence against predators, or as part of establishing social hierarchy within the herd.

Immediately behind the front incisors is the interdental space, where no teeth grow from the gums. This is where the bit is placed, if used, when horses are ridden.

Behind the interdental space, all horses also have twelve premolars and twelve molars, also known as cheek teeth or jaw teeth. These teeth chew food bitten off by incisors, prior to swallowing.

In addition to the incisors, premolars and molars, some, but not all, horses may also have canine teeth and wolf teeth. A horse can have between zero and four canine teeth, also known as tusks (tushes), with a clear prevalence towards male horses (stallions and geldings) who normally have a full set of four. Fewer than 28% of female horses (mares) have any canine teeth. Those that do normally only have one or two, and these may be only partially erupted.

Between 13 and 32% of horses, split equally between male and female, also have wolf teeth, which are not related to canine teeth, but are vestigial first premolars. Wolf teeth are more common on the upper jaw, and can present a problem for horses in work, as they can interfere with the bit. They may also make it difficult during equine dentistry work to rasp the second premolar, and are frequently removed.

== Tooth eruption ==
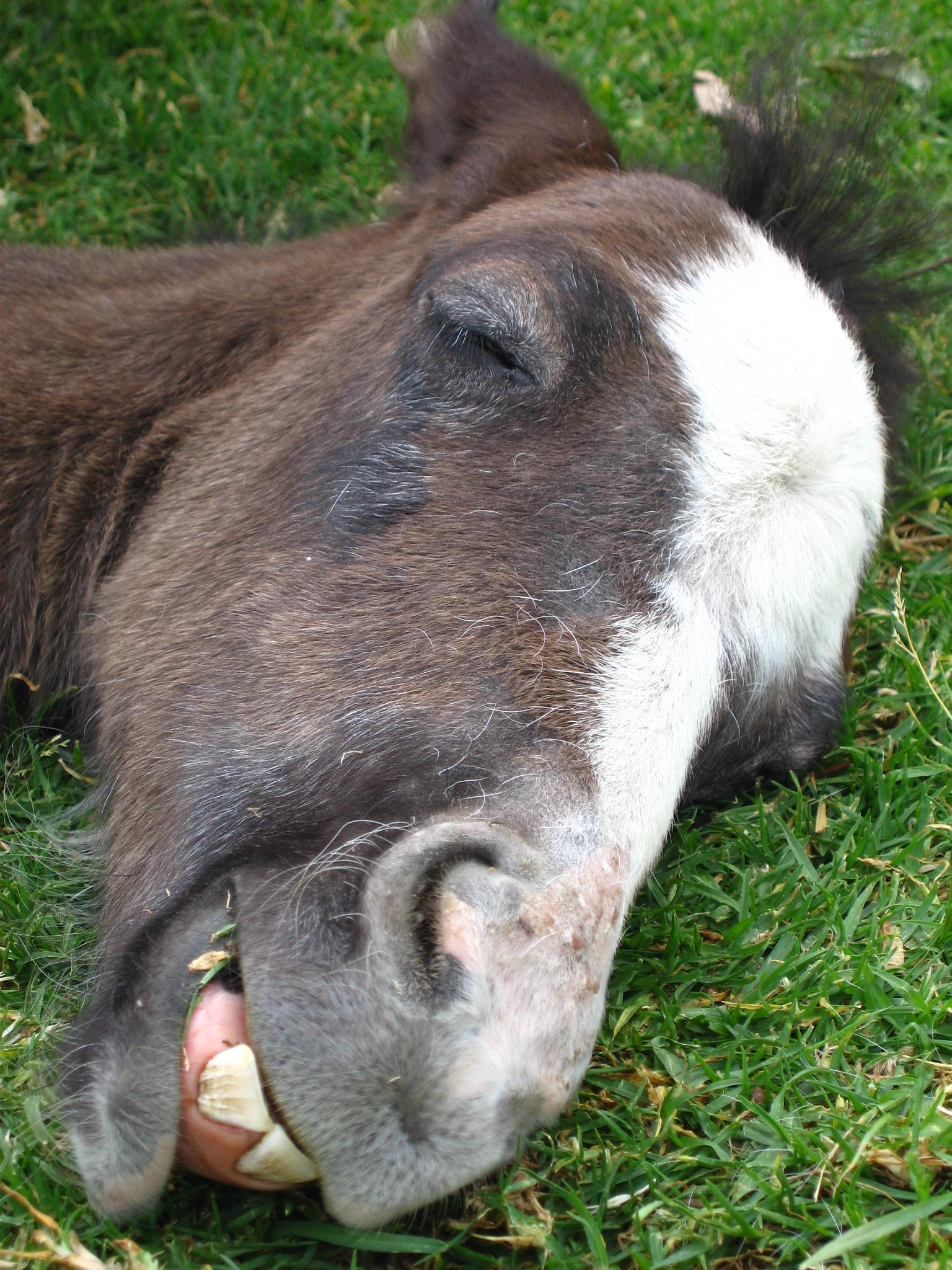
"Milk teeth" of a foal are short and oval-shaped

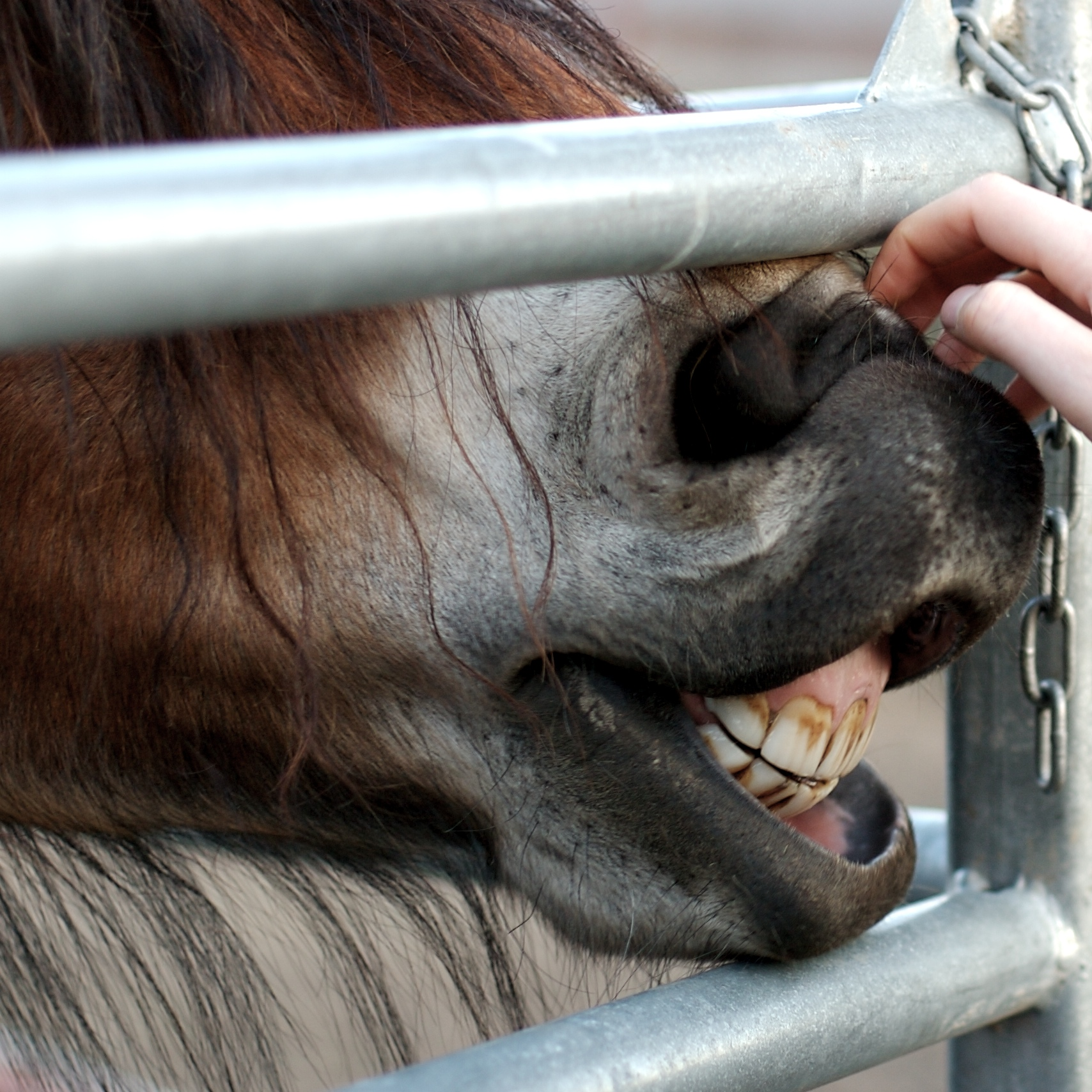
Incisors of a younger horse

Horses are diphyodontous, erupting a set of first deciduous teeth (also known as milk, temporary, or baby teeth) soon after birth, with these being replaced by permanent teeth by the age of approximately five years old. The horse will normally have 24 deciduous teeth, emerging in pairs, and eventually pushed out by the permanent teeth, which normally number between 36 and 40. As the deciduous teeth are pushed up, they are termed "caps". Caps will eventually shed on their own, but may cause discomfort when still loose, requiring extraction.

It is possible to estimate the age of a young horse by observing the pattern of teeth in the mouth, based on which teeth have erupted, although the difference between breeds and individuals make precise dating impossible.

Common ages for tooth eruption.
| Type of tooth | Number | Deciduous | Permanent |
|---|---|---|---|
| Incisor | First (central) | birth to 8 days | 2.5 yrs |
| Incisor | Second (intermediate) | 4.5–6 weeks | 3.5–4 yrs |
| Incisor | Third (corner) | 6–9 months | 4.5–5 yrs |
| Canine | | Absent | 3.5–5 yrs, some around 6 yrs (if ever) |
| Premolar | First (wolf) | Absent | 6 months to 3 years (if ever) |
| Premolar | Second | birth to 2 weeks | 2–3 yrs |
| Premolar | Third | birth to 2 weeks | 2.5–3 yrs |
| Premolar | Fourth | birth to 2 weeks | 3–4 yrs |
| Molar | First | Absent | 9–12 months |
| Molar | Second | Absent | 2 yrs |
| Molar | Third | Absent | 3–4 yrs |

All teeth are normally erupted by the age of five, at which point the horse is said to have a "full mouth", but the actual age this occurs will depend on the individual horse, and also by breed, with certain breeds having different average eruption times. For instance, in Shetland ponies the middle and corner incisor tend to erupt late, and in both draft horses and miniature horses, the permanent middle and corner incisors are usually late appearing.

Horse dentition over time

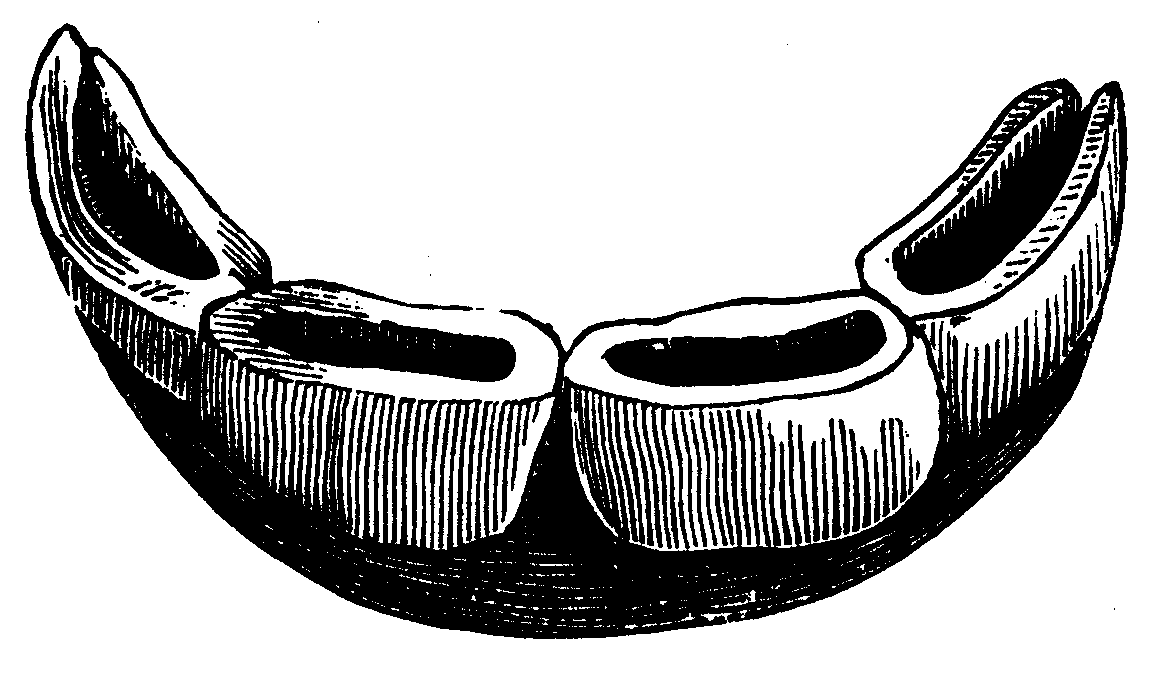
Foal

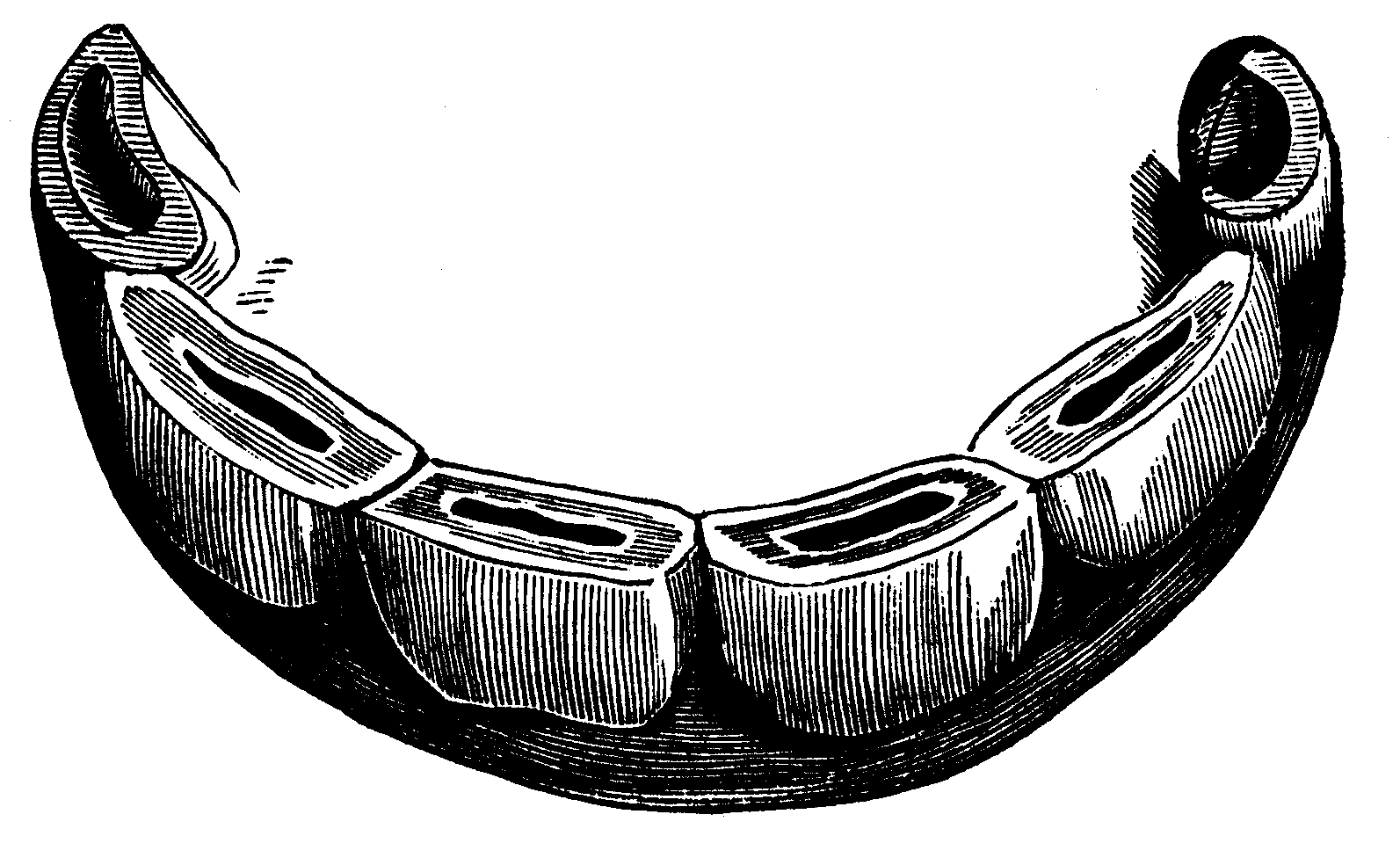
Yearling

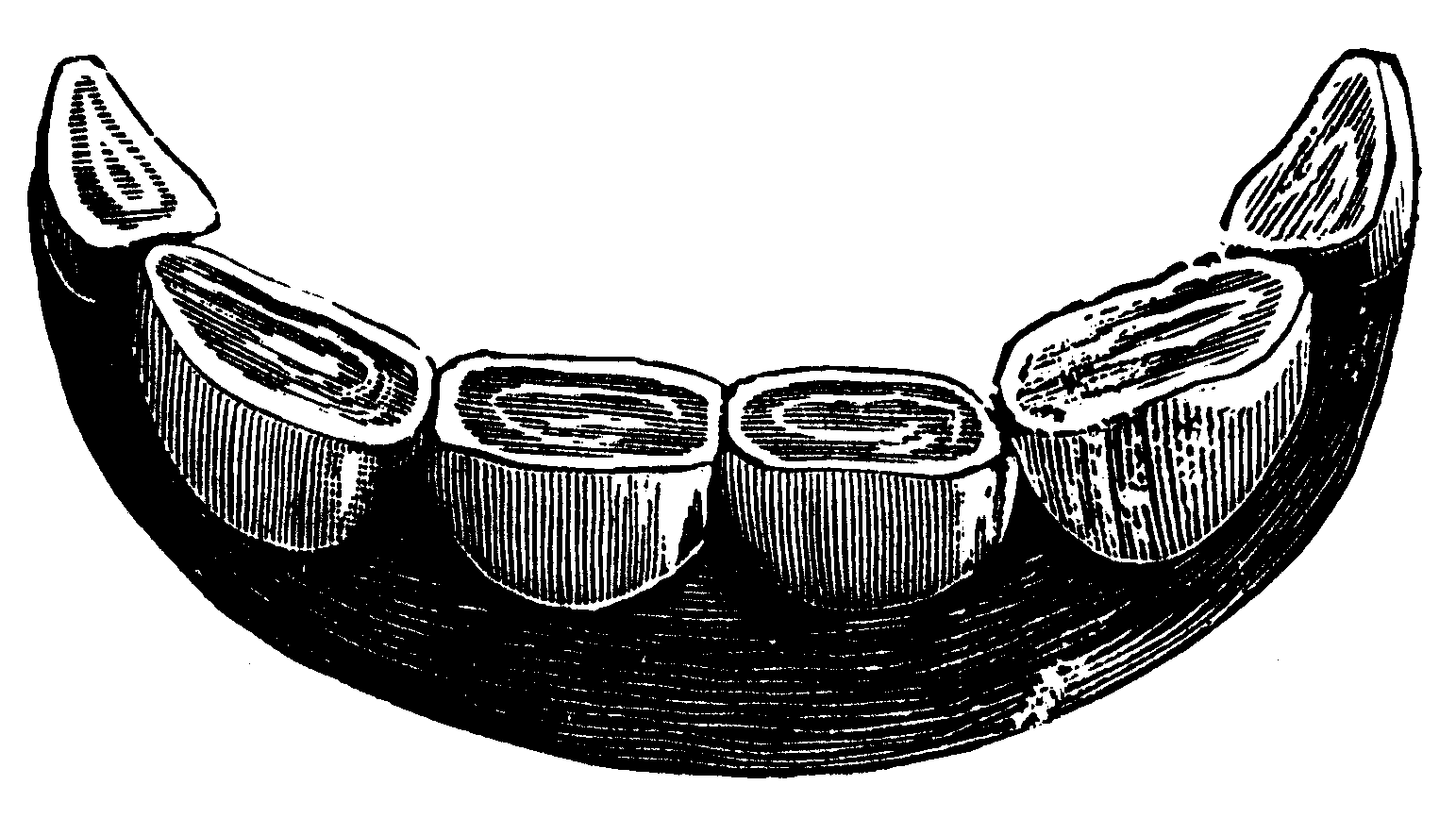
Two years

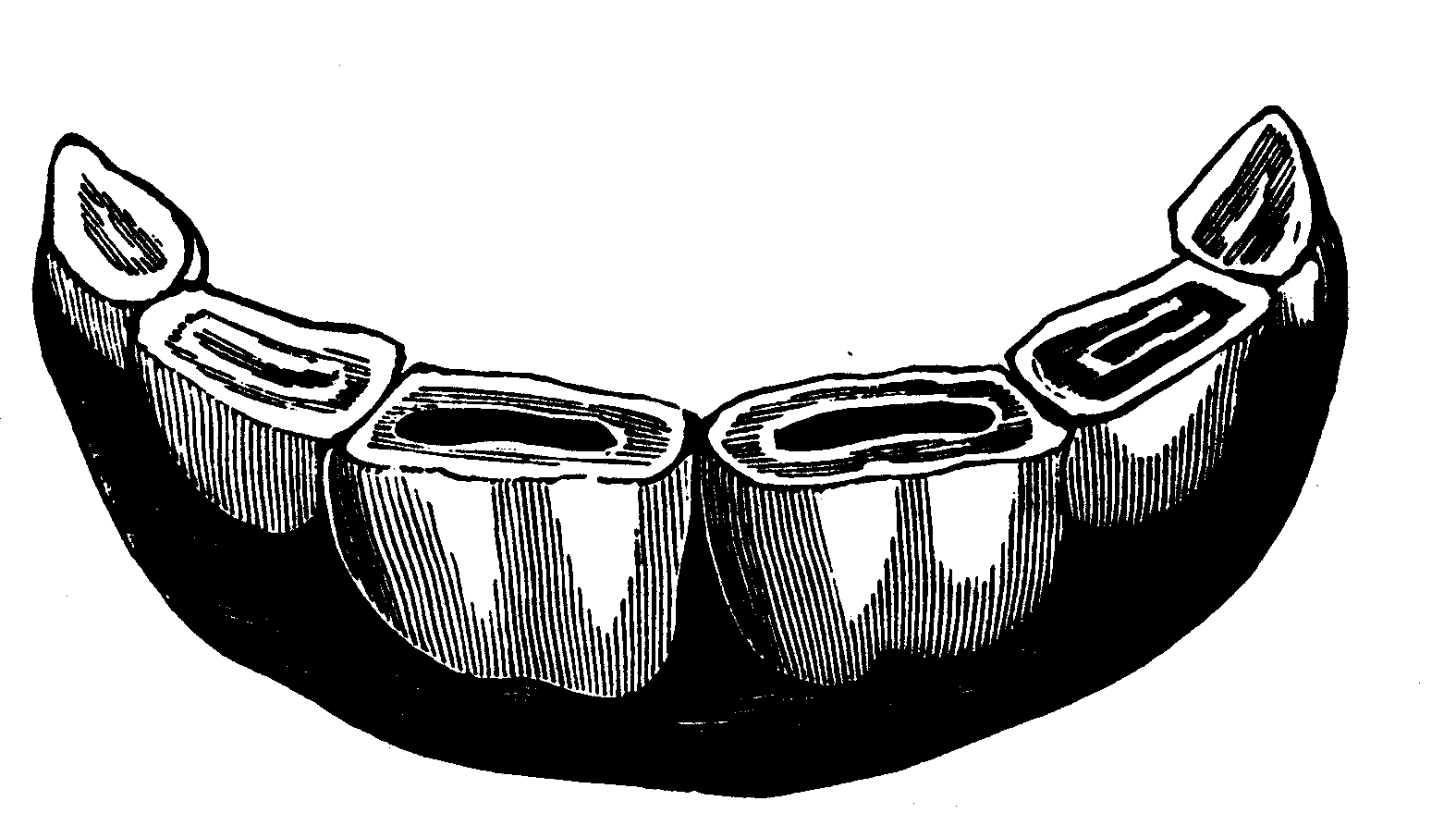
Three years

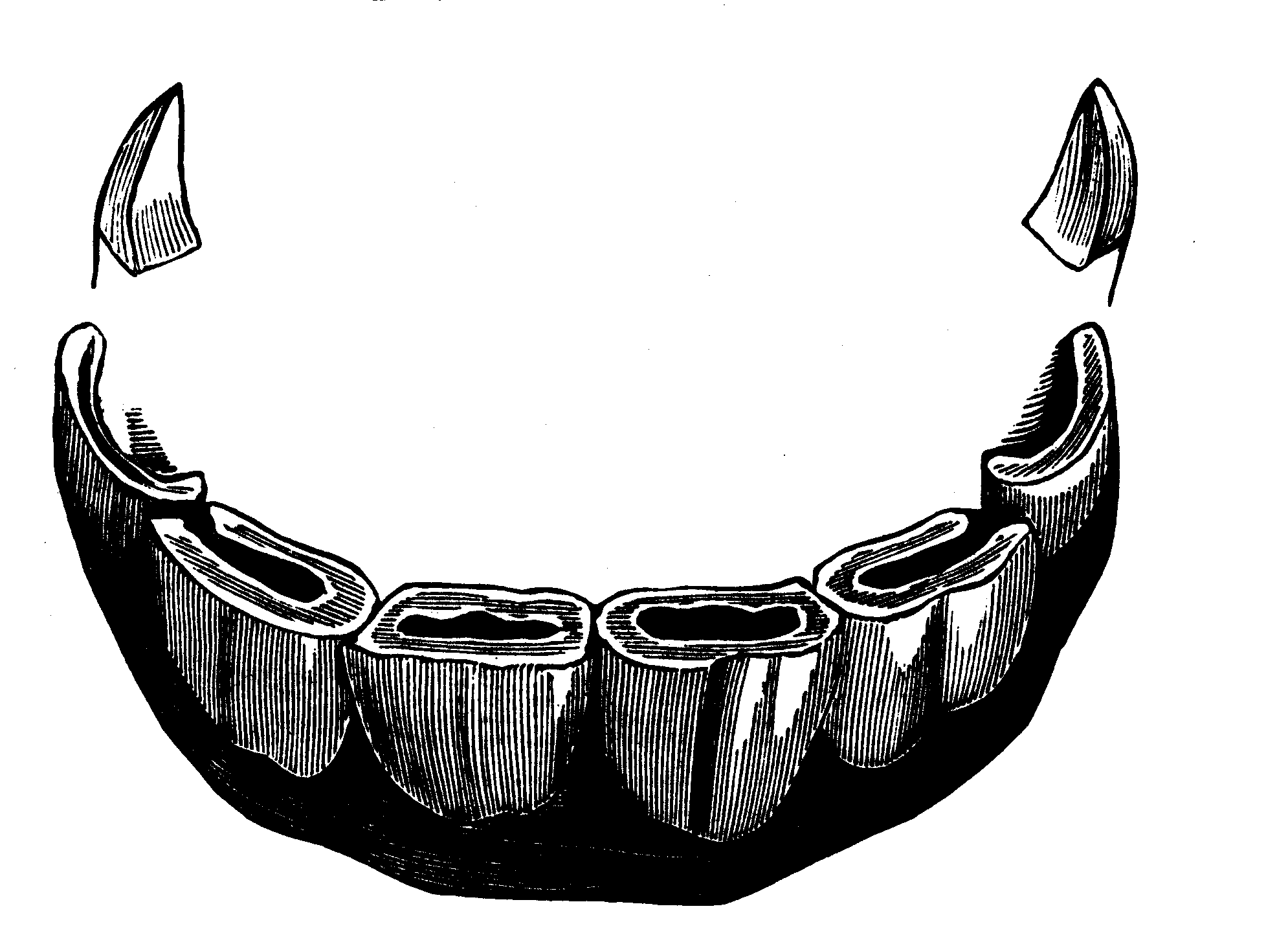
Five years

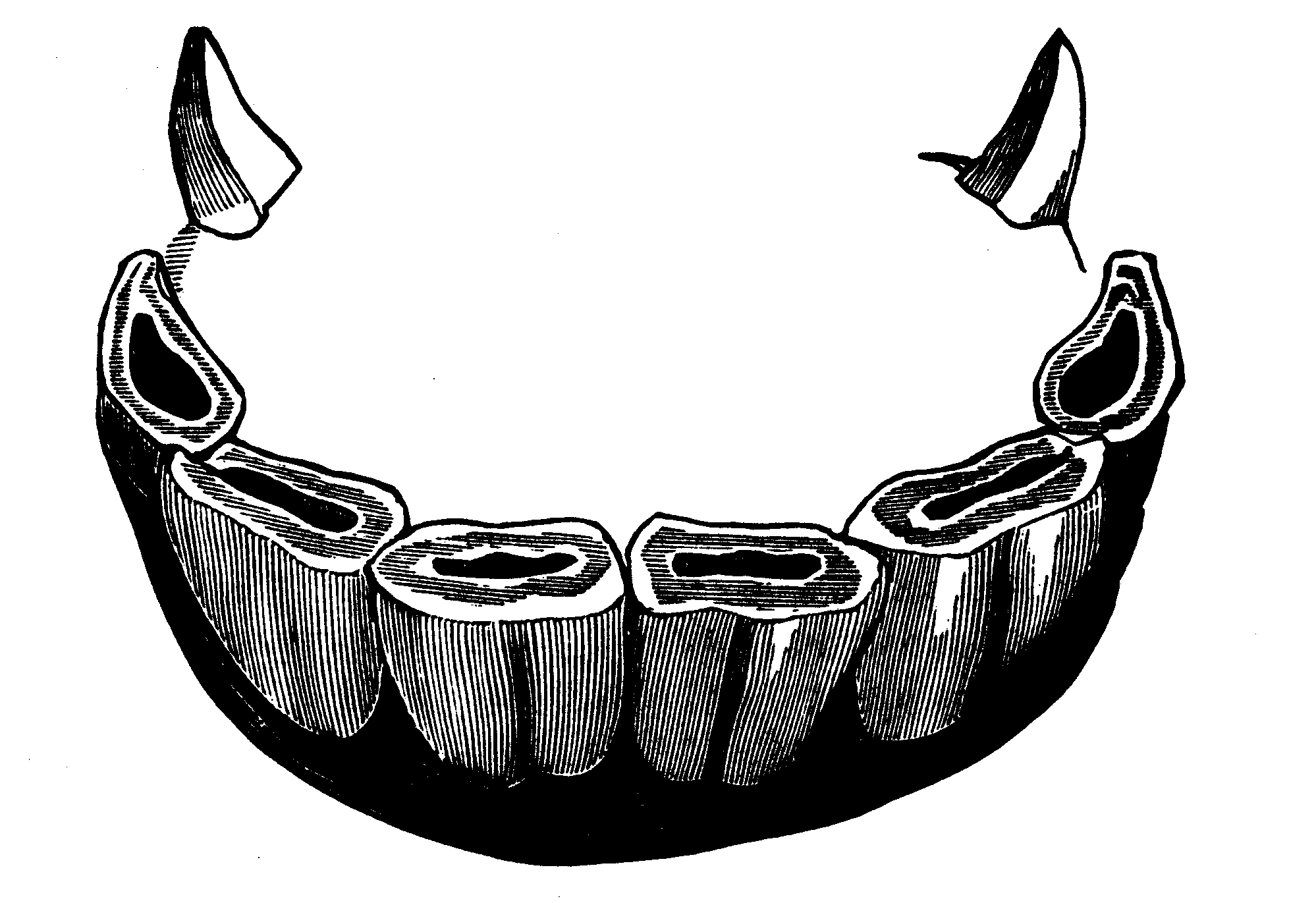
Six years

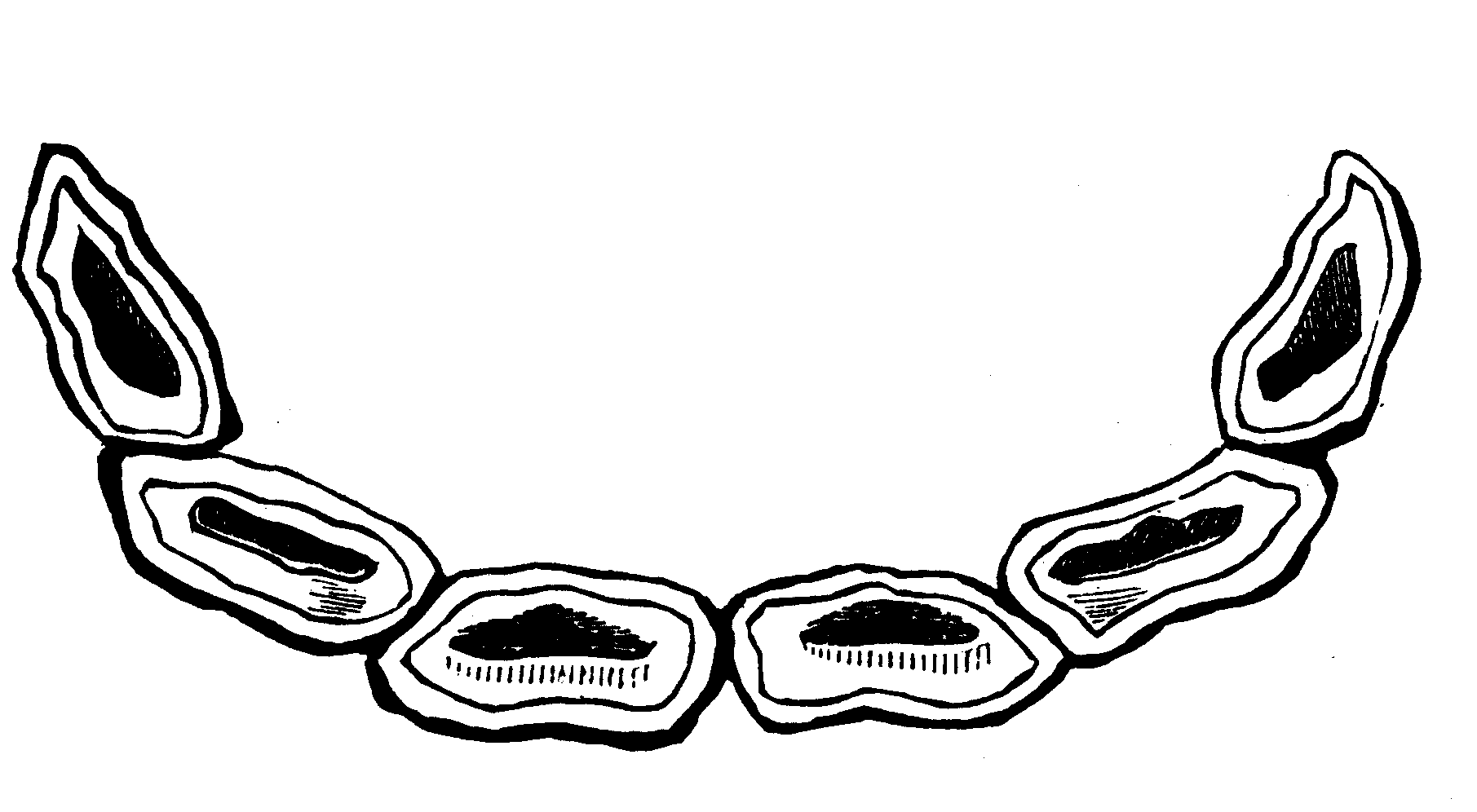
Seven years

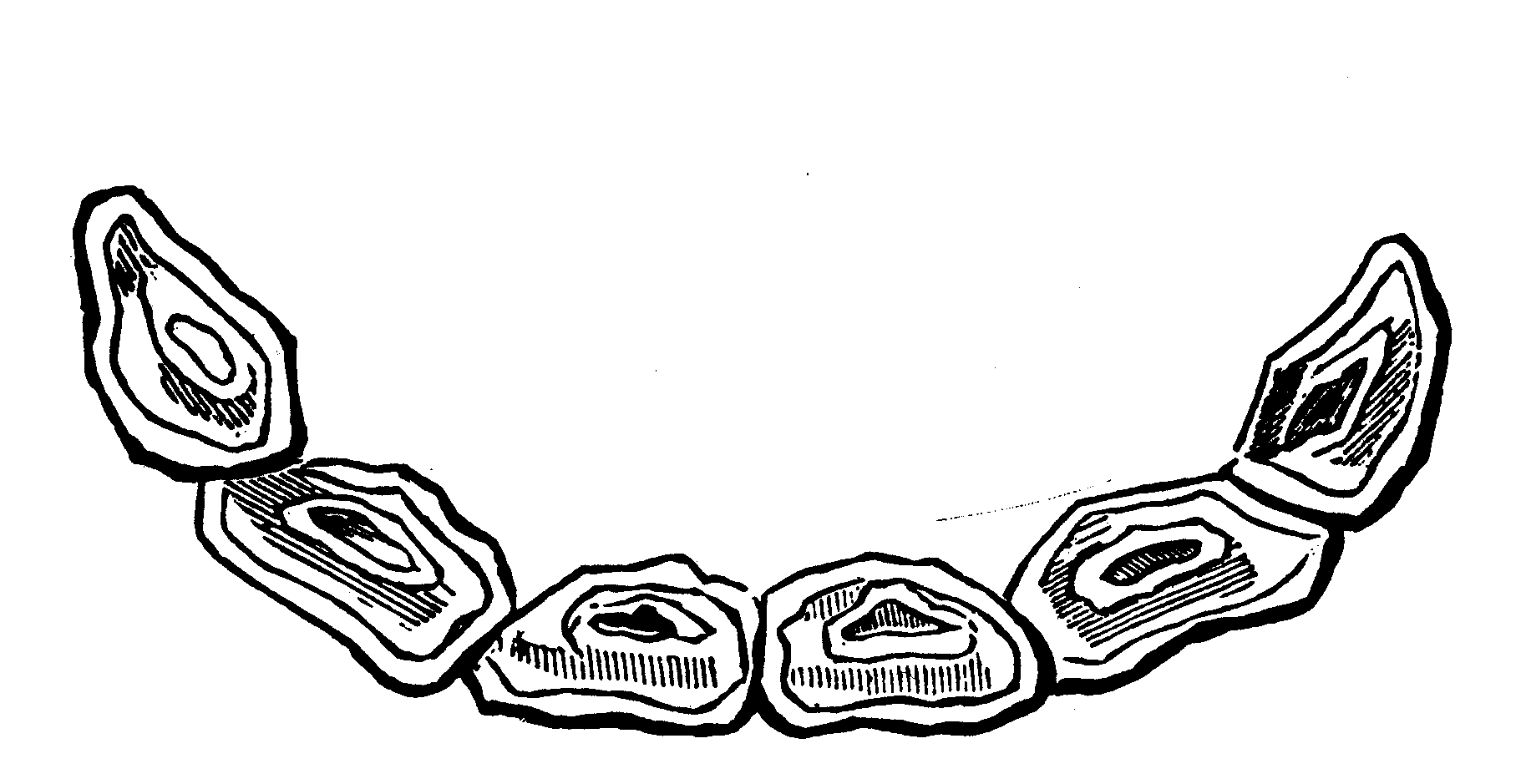
Nine years

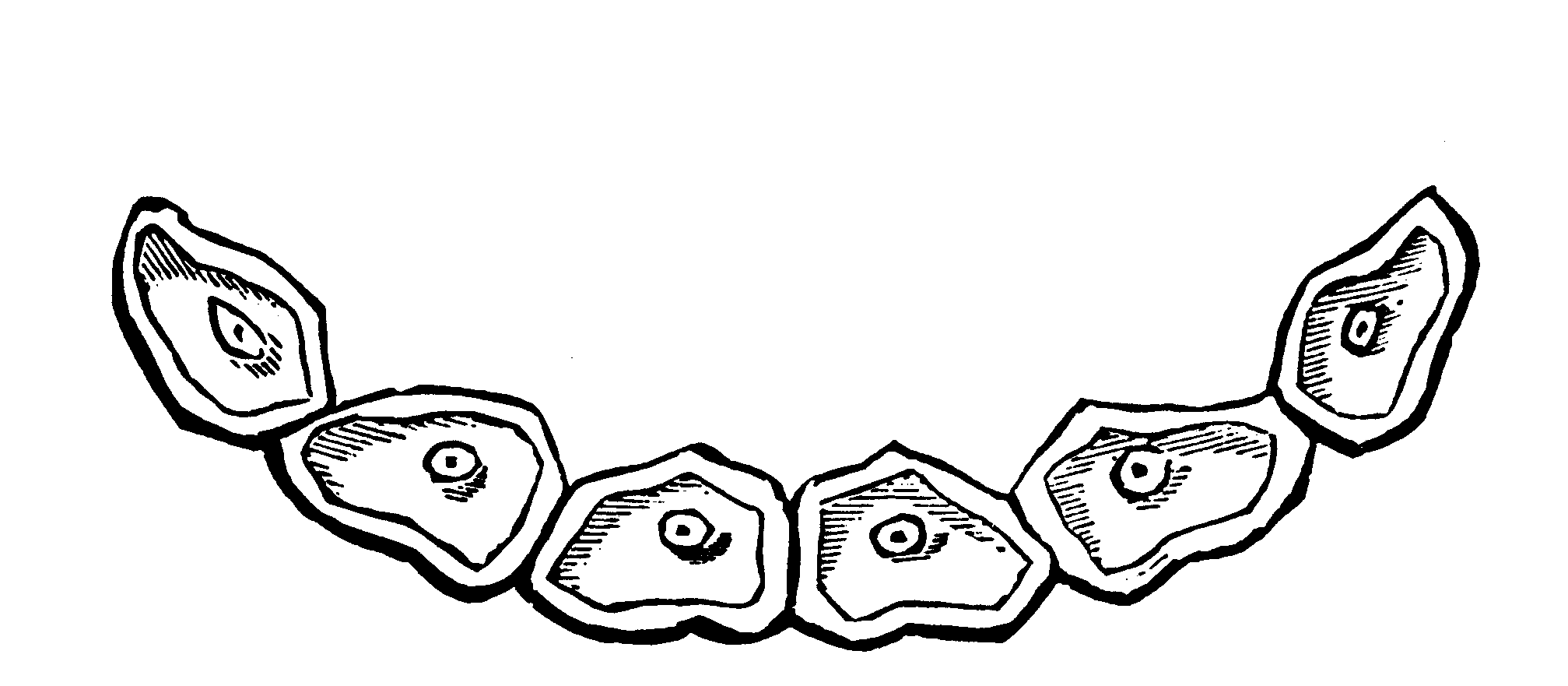
Twelve years

== Tooth wear ==
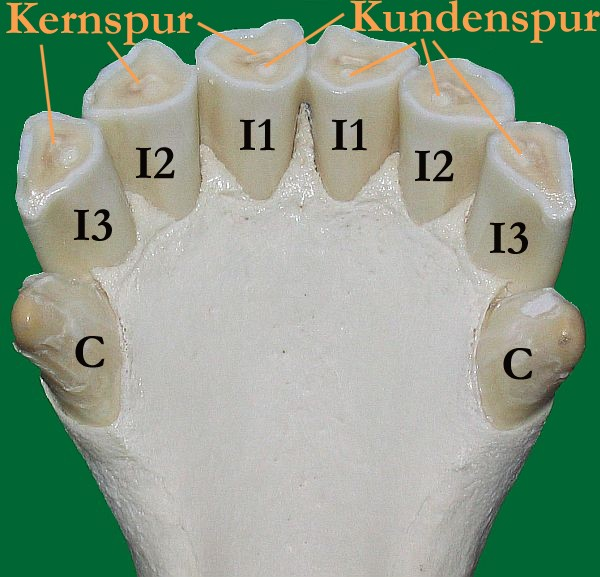
The incisors, showing the wear and marks on their tables

Horse teeth often wear in specific patterns, based on the way the horse eats its food, and these patterns are often used to conjecture on the age of the horse after it has developed a full mouth. As with aging through observing tooth eruption, this can be imprecise, and may be affected by diet, natural abnormalities, and vices such as cribbing.

The importance of dentition in assessing the age of horses led to veterinary dentistry techniques being used as a method of fraud, with owners and traders altering the teeth of horses to mimic the tooth shapes and characteristics of horses younger than the actual age of the equine.

Equine teeth have evolved to wear against the tooth above or below as the horse chews, thus preventing excess growth. The upper jaw is wider than the lower one. In some cases, sharp edges can occur on the outside of the upper molars and the inside of the lower molars, as they are unopposed by an opposite grinding surface. These sharp edges can reduce chewing efficiency of the teeth, interfere with jaw motion, and in extreme cases can cut the tongue or cheek, making eating and riding painful.

In the wild, natural foodstuffs may have allowed teeth to wear more evenly. Because many modern horses often graze on lusher, softer forage than their ancestors, and are also frequently fed grain or other concentrated feed, it is possible some natural wear may be reduced in the domestic horse. On the other hand, this same uneven wear in the wild may have at times contributed to a shorter lifespan. Modern wild horses live an estimated 20 years at most, while a domesticated horse, depending on breed and management, quite often lives 25 to 30 years. Thus, because domesticated animals also live longer, they may simply have more time to develop dental issues that their wild forebears never faced.

=== Typical wear patterns ===
The following are typical wear patterns in horses.

Cups
Cups are hollow and rectangular or oval in shape, appearing on the tables of the permanent incisors, that wear away over time. In general, cups are worn away on the lower central incisors by age 6, the lower intermediates by age 7, and corners at age 8. The cups of the upper central incisors are worn away by 9 years of age, the upper intermediate incisors by 10, and the corners by 11. When all the cups are gone, the horse is referred to as smooth mouthed. In the past, dishonest dealers would "bishop" the teeth of old horses, usually by burning an indentation into the teeth, to imitate cups: but this practice was detectable by the absence of the white edge of enamel that always surrounds the real cup, by the shape of the teeth, and other marks of age about the animal.

Pulp mark/dental star
After some wear has occurred on the teeth, the central pulp cavity is exposed, and the tooth is marked by a "dental star" or "pulp mark" that is smaller than the incisor cups. These begin as a dark line in front of the dental cup, which grows in size and becomes more oval in shape as the cups are worn away. Dental stars are usually first visible at age 6, on the animal's lower central incisors, and very visible by age 8. They appear on the lower intermediates by age 9, and on the other incisors between the ages of 10–12 years.

Hook/notch
A hook appears on the upper corner incisor around age 7, and disappears by age 8. It reappears around age 13, again disappearing about 1 year later.

Galvayne's groove
The Galvayne's groove occurs on the upper corner incisor, producing a vertical line, and is helpful in approximating the age of older horses. It generally first appears at age 10, reaches halfway down the tooth by age 15, and is completely down the tooth at age 20. It then begins to disappear, usually half-way gone by age 25, and completely gone by age 30. The groove is named after horse expert Sydney Frederick Galvayne who claimed he had invented the use the groove to age a horse; however, it had been earlier described by his teacher Professor Hamilton Sample.

Angle and shape of the incisors
As the horse ages, the angle of the incisors generally becomes more acute, slanting forward. The incisors gradually change their form as the horse ages, becoming round, oval, and then triangular.

== Continuous eruption and loss ==
A horse's incisors, premolars, and molars, once fully developed, continue to erupt as the grinding surface is worn down through chewing. A young adult horse's teeth are typically 4.5–5 inches long, but the majority of the crown remains below the gumline in the dental socket. The rest of the tooth slowly emerges from the jaw, erupting about 1/8" each year, as the horse ages. When the animal reaches old age, the crowns of the teeth are very short and the teeth are often lost altogether. Very old horses, if lacking molars to chew, may need soft feeds to maintain adequate levels of nutrition.

Older horses may appear to have a lean, shallow lower jaw, as the roots of the teeth have begun to disappear. Younger horses may seem to have a lumpy jaw, due to the presence of permanent teeth within the jaw.

== The teeth and the bit ==
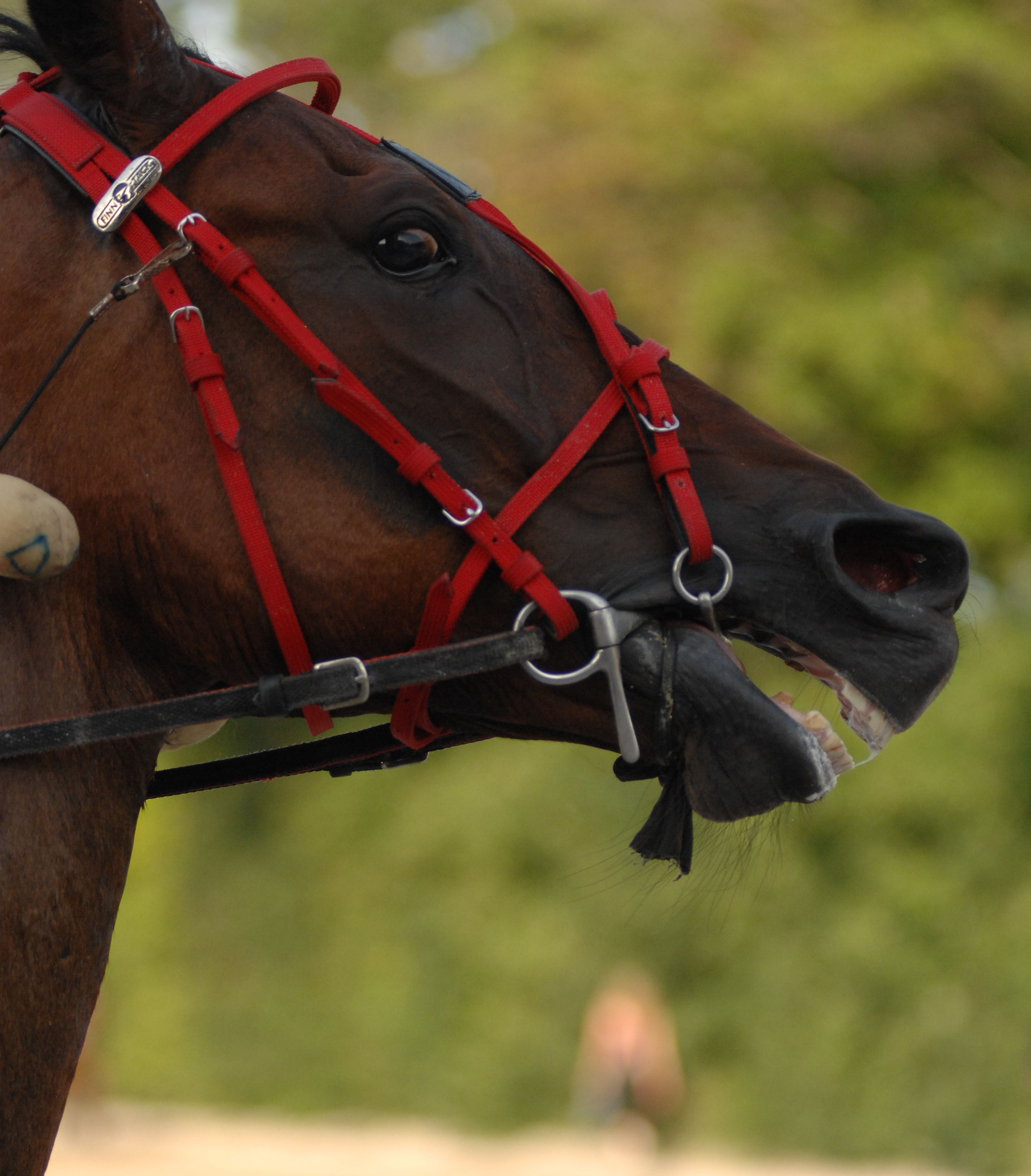
Shows position of bit behind the incisors, but in front of the premolars

If a bit is fitted to a horse, along with a bridle, the normally metal bar of the bit lies in the interdental space between the incisors (or canines, where present) and premolars. If the bridle is adjusted so that the bit rests too low, or too high, it may push against the teeth and cause discomfort.

Sometimes, a "bit seat" is filed in the first premolar, where the surface is rounded so that the flesh of the cheek is not pushed into the sharp edge of the tooth, making riding more comfortable for the horse, although the practice is controversial.

== Dental problems ==
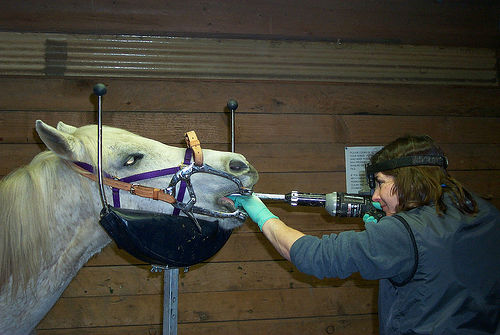
Modern equine dentistry. This horse is heavily sedated and has been given analgesics, its head is supported by a sling. The mouth is kept open with a (horse) mouth gag, commonly referred to as a "speculum".

Like all mammals, horses can develop a variety of dental problems, with a variety of dental services available to minimise problems through reactive or prophylactic intervention.

Equine dentistry can be undertaken by a vet or by a trained specialist such as an equine dental technician, or in some cases is performed by lay persons, including owners or trainers.

Problems with dentition for horses in work can result in poor performance or behavioural issues, and must be ruled out as the cause of negative behaviours in horse. Most authorities recommend regular checks by a professional, normally six monthly or annually.

=== Problems due to wear patterns ===
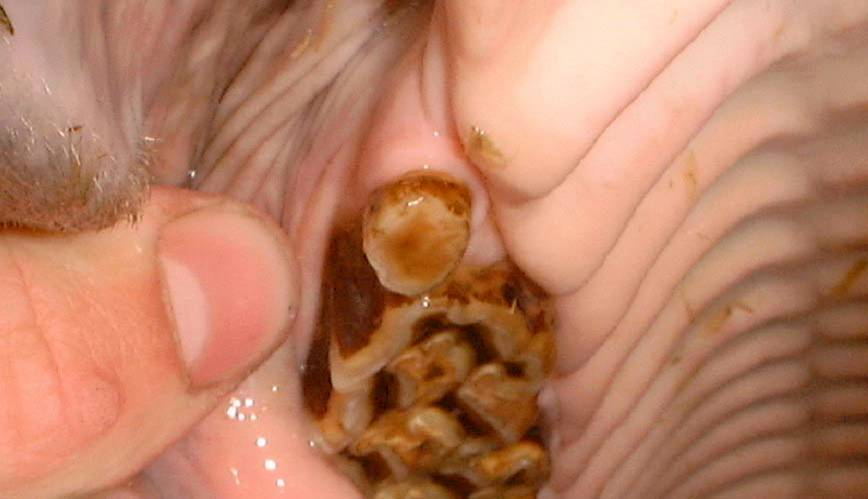
A wolf tooth, located just in front of the premolars

The wear of the teeth can cause problems if it is uneven, with sharp points appearing, especially on the outer edge of the molars, the inner edge of the premolars and the posterior end of the last molars on the bottom jaw.

Other specific conditions relating to wear include a "step mouth", where one molar or premolar grows longer than the others in that jaw, normally because the corresponding tooth in the opposite jaw is missing or broken, and therefore could not wear down its opposite, a "wave mouth", where at least two molars or premolars are higher than the others, so that, when viewed from the side, the grinding surfaces produce a wave-like pattern rather than a straight line, leading to periodontal disease and excessive wear of some of the teeth, and a "shear mouth" when the grinding surfaces of the molars or premolars are severely sloped on each individual tooth (so the inner side of the teeth are much higher or lower than the outer side of the teeth), severely affecting chewing.

Horses may also experience an overbite/brachygnathism (parrot mouth), or an underbite/prognathism (sow mouth, monkey mouth). These may affect how the incisors wear. In severe cases, the horse's ability to graze may be affected. Horses also sometimes suffer from equine malocclusion where there is a misalignment between their upper and lower jaws.

The curvature of the incisors may also vary from the normal, straight bite. The curvature may be dorsal or ventral . These curvatures may be the result of an incisor malocclusion (e.g. ventral=overbite/dorsal=underbite). The curvature may also be diagonal, stemming from a wear pattern, offset incisors, or pain in the cheek teeth (rather than the incisors), which causes the horse to chew in one direction over the other.

=== Other dental problems ===
Other common problems include abscessed, loose, infected, or cracked teeth, retained deciduous teeth, and plaque buildup. Wolf teeth may also cause problems, and are many times removed, as are retained caps.

=== Prevention of dental problems ===
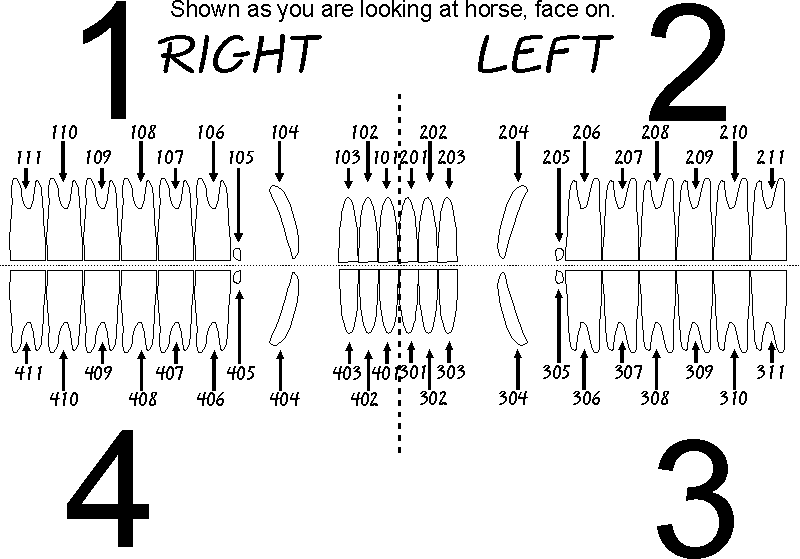
Many veterinarians will use a Triadan chart to record the horse's dental problems for future reference.

To help prevent dental problems, it is recommended to get a horse's teeth checked by a vet or equine dental technician every 6 months. However, regular checks may be needed more often for individuals, especially if the horse is very young or very old. Additionally, the horse's teeth should be checked if it is having major performance problems or showing any of the above signs of a dental problem.

Many horses require floating (or rasping) of teeth once every 12 months, although this, too, is variable and dependent on the individual horse. The first four or five years of a horse's life are when the most growth-related changes occur and hence frequent checkups may prevent problems from developing. Equine teeth get harder as the horse gets older and may not have rapid changes during the prime adult years of life, but as horses become aged, particularly from the late teens on, additional changes in incisor angle and other molar growth patterns often necessitate frequent care. Once a horse is in its late 20s or early 30s, molar loss becomes a concern. Floating involves a veterinarian wearing down the surface of the teeth, usually to remove sharp points or to balance out the mouth. However, the veterinarian must be careful not to take off too much of the surface, or there will not be enough roughened area on the tooth to allow it to properly tear apart food. Additionally, too much work on a tooth can cause thermal damage (which could lead to having to extract the tooth), or expose the sensitive interior of the tooth (pulp). A person without a veterinary degree who performs this service is called a horse floater or equine dental technician.

== In popular culture ==
The common folk saying "don't look a gift horse in the mouth" is taken from the era when gifting horses was common. The teeth of a horse are a good indication of the age of the animal, and it was considered rude to inspect the teeth of a gifted animal as you would one that you were purchasing. The saying is used in reference to being an ungrateful gift receiver.
