= Miller's Word =

Coined in the 18th century in imitation of the Mason's Word, which restricted access to the lodges of Stonemasons and later Freemasonry, and followed by the Horseman's Word, the Miller's Word identified members of a trade guild formed to restrict entry into and control the profession of grain milling, as well as to protect its members' interests. Like the Masons Word, its foundation was local groups with initiations, passwords, and secret trade knowledge.

The Miller's Word introduced an element of deliberate diabolism into its symbolism and ceremonies. Oaths sworn at its initiations apparently derive from oaths supposedly sworn by witches in making pacts with the devil. The word could allegedly set the workings of a mill into motion without the aid of human assistance.
