= Sydney Frederick Galvayne =

Horse expert

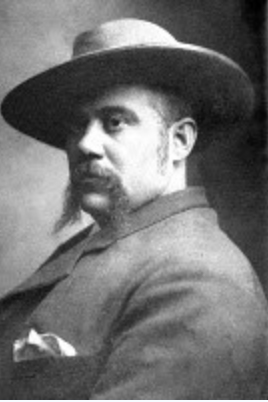
- Horse Tamer and Author
- Born: April 2, 1848; Peckham, Surrey
- Died: June 10, 1913 (aged 65); Ovington, Hampshire, England
- Spouse(s): Emily A Westley, Edith Webster Morgan, Sarah Ann Unknown, Gertrude May Atkinson and Emilie Newell Simpson.
- Children: Frederick Henry George Attride, Albert Vernon Attride Galvayne, Winifred Emily Attride, Harold Frederick Clark Osborne (Morgan), Francis Dorrington Osborne (Morgan), Cecil W R Galvayne, Rita M Galvayne and Nita Beryl Webster Attride.
- Parent(s): Henry Attride and Sarah Anne Phillips

Sydney Frederick Galvayne (2 April 1848 - 10 June 1913) was the nom de plume of Frederick Henry Attride, also known as Ralph Frederick Osborne, a well-known Victorian-era horse tamer, and author. He was a renowned expert in the health and well-being of horses and authored four books on the topic. He is best known for estimating the age of a horse by a groove on its teeth. The groove is widely known as the Galvayne's Groove, and is located on the lateral surface of the upper third incisor.

== Birth and family ==
Frederick Henry Attride was born on 2 April 1848, at Park Road in Peckham. His parents were Henry and Sarah Attride (nee Phillips), and Frederick was the second child of ten children. Henry was a Clerk at the Bank of England.

== Early years ==
Frederick went to school at the Upper School in Peckham, founded by Dr. John Yeats, for four years and the Manilla College, another Independent Boys School, established by Mr. John Douglas for three years. His schooling was clearly focused on a career in the City of London, like his father and grandfather before him. Frederick was a keen sportsman, both in cricket and athletics. There was a great cricket oval at Peckham Rye near his home and school. He played at least one game at The Oval. His father Henry was a committee member of the Hanover Cricket Club for whom Frederick played. At the time Cricket clubs also participated in athletics where he was a runner in the 440 yards handicap.

== The Bank of England ==
Frederick followed in his father’s footsteps and became a Clerk in the Bank of England at the age of 18 as an unattached clerk in the Accountant Departments Bank Note Office. However, three years later he was asked to tender his resignation because he made a false statement to the bank about loans that he had taken out. He was then employed as a Brewer's Clerk.

== Horse taming ==
Frederick, after facing Bankruptcy in late 1872, left the United Kingdom, leaving his wife Emily and two sons, under the assumed name of Ralph Frederick Osborne. He arrived in Australia in March 1876.

In November of that year, he took on the license of the Albion Hotel in Bank Street, Belfast, Victoria (now known as Port Fairy) in the person of Ralph Frederick Osborne. The advertisement that announced his arrival and appeared in the Belfast Gazette on 10 November 1876, states that, ‘The building is now undergoing a complete renovation and is being refurnished, which will make it one of the most comfortable hotels in the Western District.’ He left Belfast sometime in 1877.

He became a horseman and acquired his knowledge of horses while in the colony of New South Wales where he bought horses for sale from the Darling River, the Riverina and around Mudgee. He also drove horses between Paramatta and Sydney, Australia. He traveled widely in Australia and spent time in the pastoral areas of Queensland where he had a first-hand knowledge of the Warrego River, Walloon and Banana on the Dawson River, Westwood and Rockhampton in central Queensland and Eton and Bowen further north. In May 1878 he also trucked hoses by rail from Wodonga to Melbourne for sale.

In 1879 he went to Sydney and ran a business called ‘F. OSBORNE and CO., Horse Bazaar’ in the Haymarket area. He later moved the business to Melbourne where he married and fathered two boys. It was here that he met Professor Hamilton Sample, an American horse tamer and author who taught Frederick the art of horse taming. Frederick was a good student and used Professor Sample’s teaching to become a horse tamer. He reinvented himself as Professor Sydney Frederick Galvayne, the Australian Horse Tamer. He left Melbourne and returned to the United Kingdom as a new and successful horse tamer.

Frederick arrived in London six months before Sample did. Sample on his return to London found that Frederick was using his horse taming system and had his own horse taming show. He demanded that Frederick become part of his horse taming show otherwise, he would let it be known that Frederick had breached their confidentially agreement. Frederick must have introduced his brother-in-law, George Sexton, known as Franklin, a clerk, to Sample and then Frederick and Sexton joined Sample's entourage. It appears that during that time Sexton learned 'the system’ from Sample. Subsequently, Frederick and Sexton fell out and parted ways. Later, Sexton ‘burst on the world’ as 'Professor Leon the celebrated Mexican Horse Tamer' with his own horse taming show. It looks like as a publicity stunt Frederick challenged Sexton to a horse-breaking contest. It seems as though the challenge was never taken up.

Frederick was known as a scientific and humane horse tamer using a humane system of training unbroken or vicious horses that utilized the horse’s strength against itself. He held over 300 classes teaching these methods and in 1887 appeared before Queen Victoria. He is also known for "Galvayning", a horse-taming method he invented in which the horse's head was tied to its tail causing it to spin around until it quieted down. On the outbreak of the Second Boer War in 1899, Frederick, using the name Sydney Galvayne, volunteered for active service. He left for South Africa to serve in the Army Remount Service as a farrier and was appointed an honorary lieutenant and horse breaker. He was awarded the Queen's South Africa Medal with four clasps (Cape Colony, Orange Free State, Transvaal, and Natal).

== Author ==
During his lifetime Frederick wrote four books on horses under the name of Sydney Galvayne. First was, Horse dentition: showing how to tell exactly the age of a horse up to thirty years published in 1885. This book is still used in horse dentistry today. The second was, The horse: its taming, training, and general management: with anecdotes, &c., relating to horses and horsemen published in 1888. Third, War horses present & future: or, Remount life in South Africa in 1902 and finally The XXth century book on the horse in 1905. This book also contained a Practical Treatise on Training Ponies and Playing Polo, by his son Fred. Galvayne, born Frederick Henry George Attride. He also wrote articles for newspapers.

== Controversy ==
The method of aging a horse called the Galvayne's Groove which he claimed as his invention was actually promoted by Professor Hamilton Sample in his book, The Horse and Dog: Not as They are But as They Should Be in 1882, where he demonstrated ‘how to tell a horses age up to 21 years’. It can be drawn from this that Frederick was not the originator of this theory; however, he made it his own, and the groove on the horses’ tooth is still called the Galvayne Groove today.

== Marriage and children ==
Frederick was married five times and had eight children.

== Death ==
He died on 10 June 1913 in Ovington, Hampshire, England.

== See also ==
- Army Remount Service
- Horse teeth
- The Horseman's Word
