= Toadman =

A toadman or toad-man is someone, in the folklore of the Fens of East Anglia and Lincolnshire, who has made a deal with the devil which gives them control over horses. Stories of toadmen seem to have been prevalent in the region during the inter-war period of 1918 to 1938.

The initiation ceremony, with certain regional variations, involved the initiate catching a male toad, hanging it from a thorn bush or pegging it to an anthill until its bones had been picked clean, and then carrying the bones on their person until dried. The bones were then thrown into a running stream on a full moon at midnight and all except one would be swept downstream. The remaining small fork-shaped bone when recovered would, through unspecified means, grant its holder psychic control over horses.

== See also ==
- The Horseman's Word
- The Moon Stallion
