= Brachygnathism =

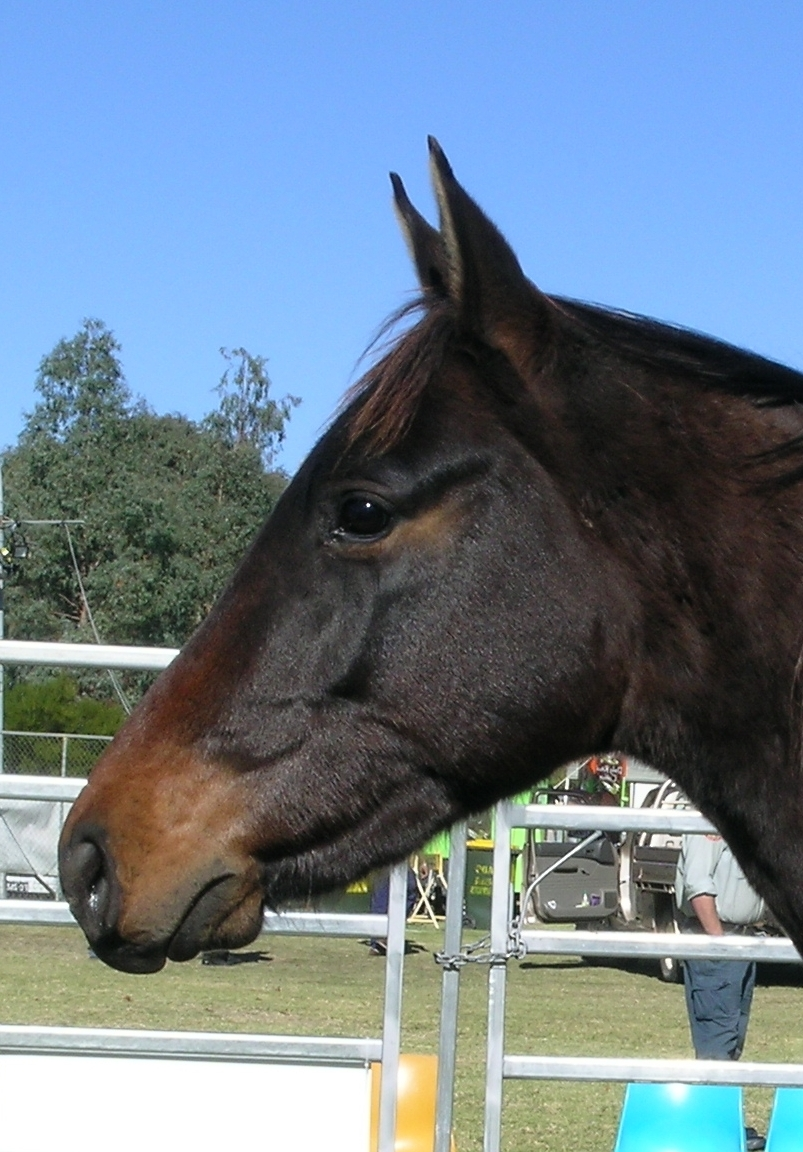
Horse with parrot mouth

Brachygnathism, or colloquially parrot mouth, is the uneven alignment of the upper and lower teeth in animals. In serious cases, the upper teeth protrude beyond the lower teeth. Problem with parrot mouth occur if the molars at the back of the mouth are also uneven, resulting in large hooks forming on the upper molars and the rear of the lower back molars. Horses with parrot mouth often require dental treatment at least every six months to remove the hooks and maintain alignment.

The equivalent conditions in humans are termed retrognathism or prognathism depending on whether the lower jaw is too far back or too far forward respectively.

== See also ==
- Horse teeth
- Horse conformation
- Veterinary dentistry
