= Veterinary dentistry =

Branch of veterinary medicine

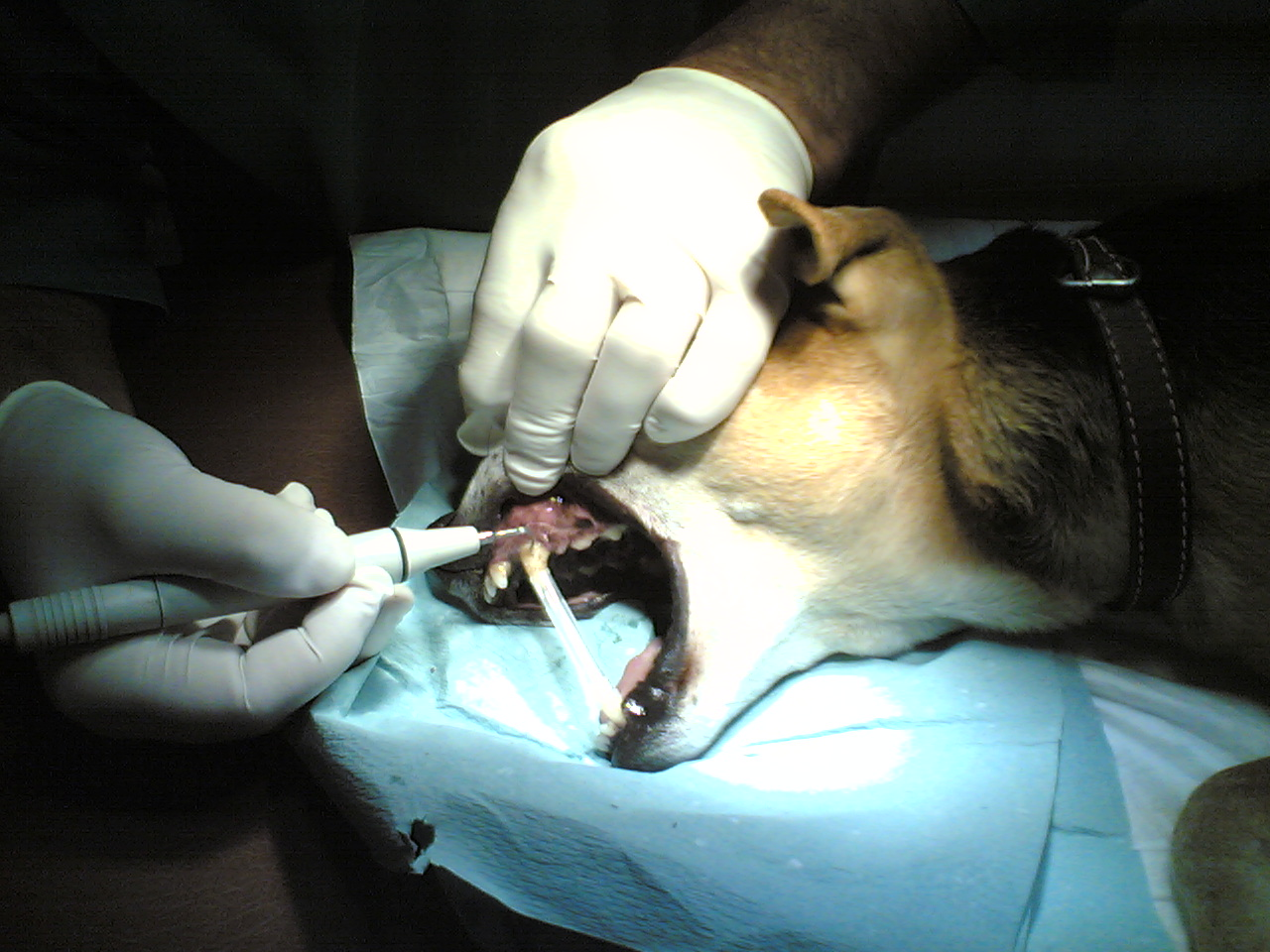
Dog undergoing dental treatment

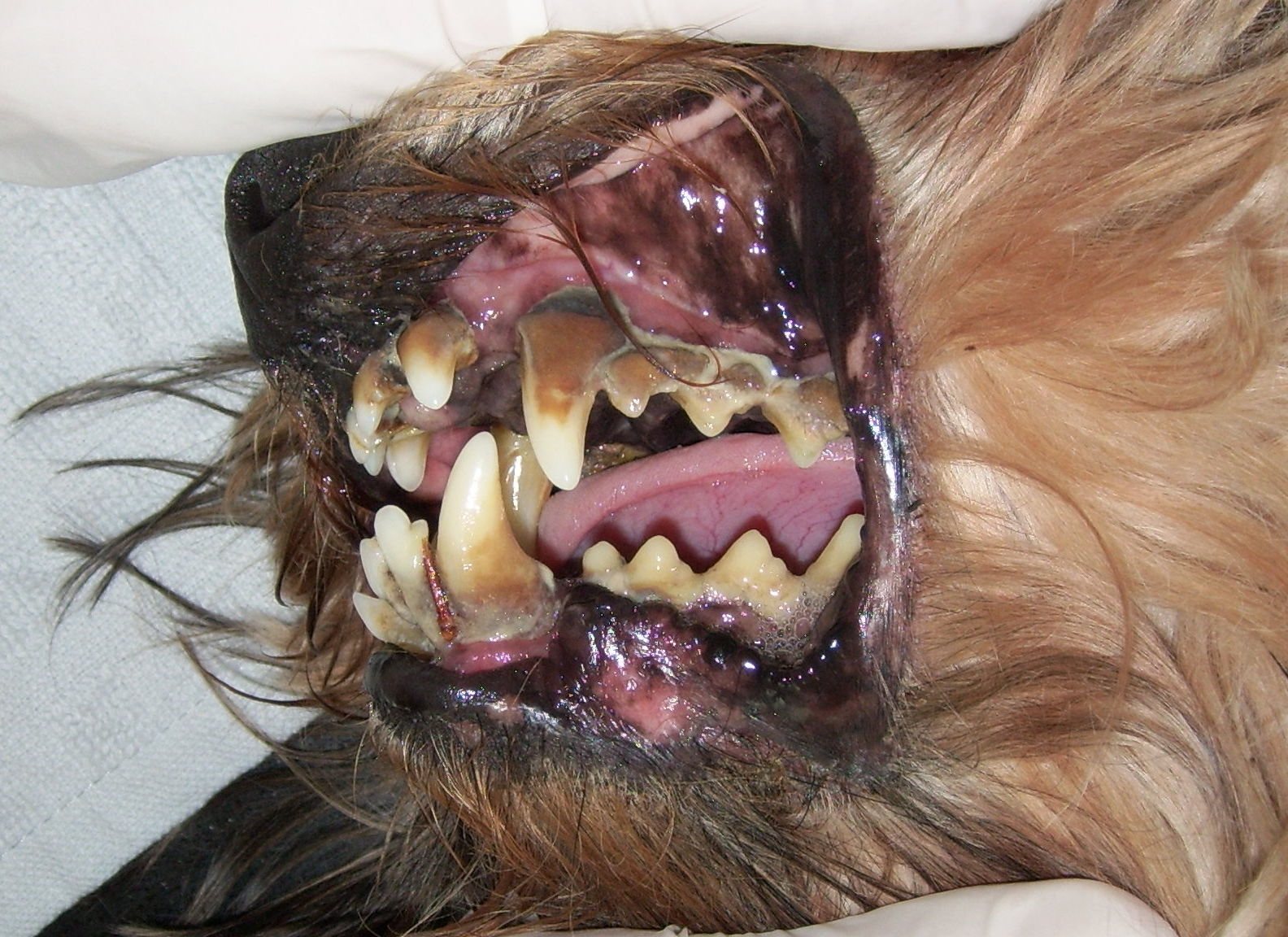
Dog with periodontal disease

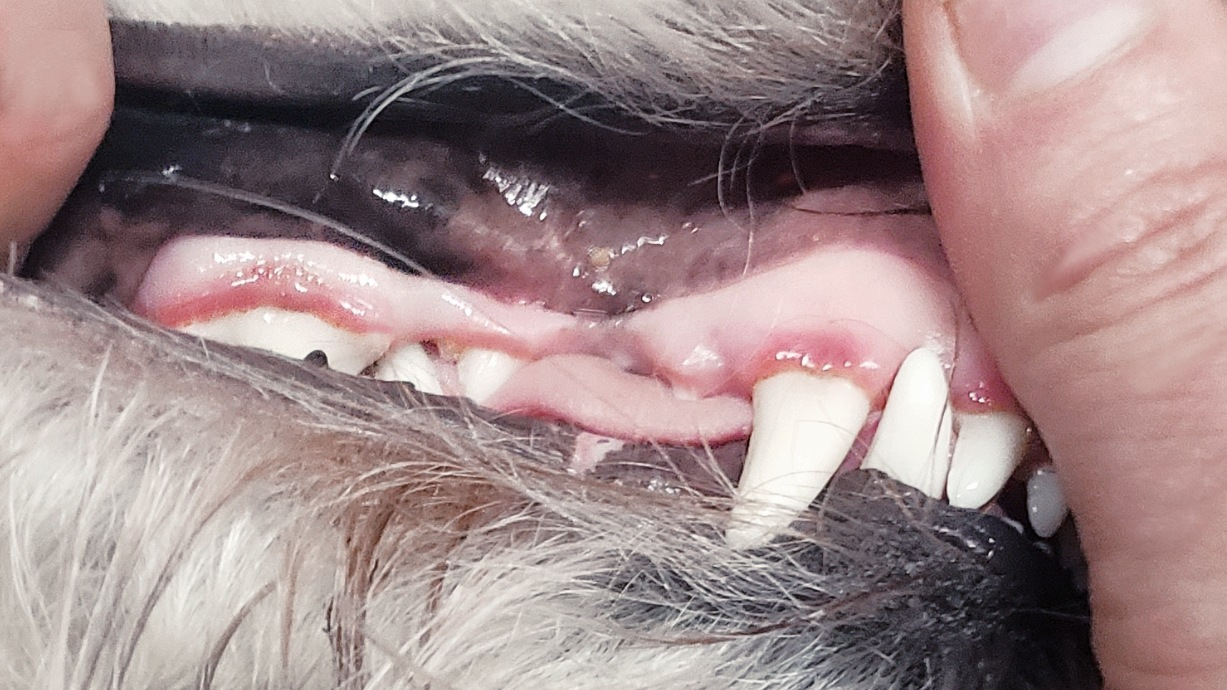
A canine with gingivitis

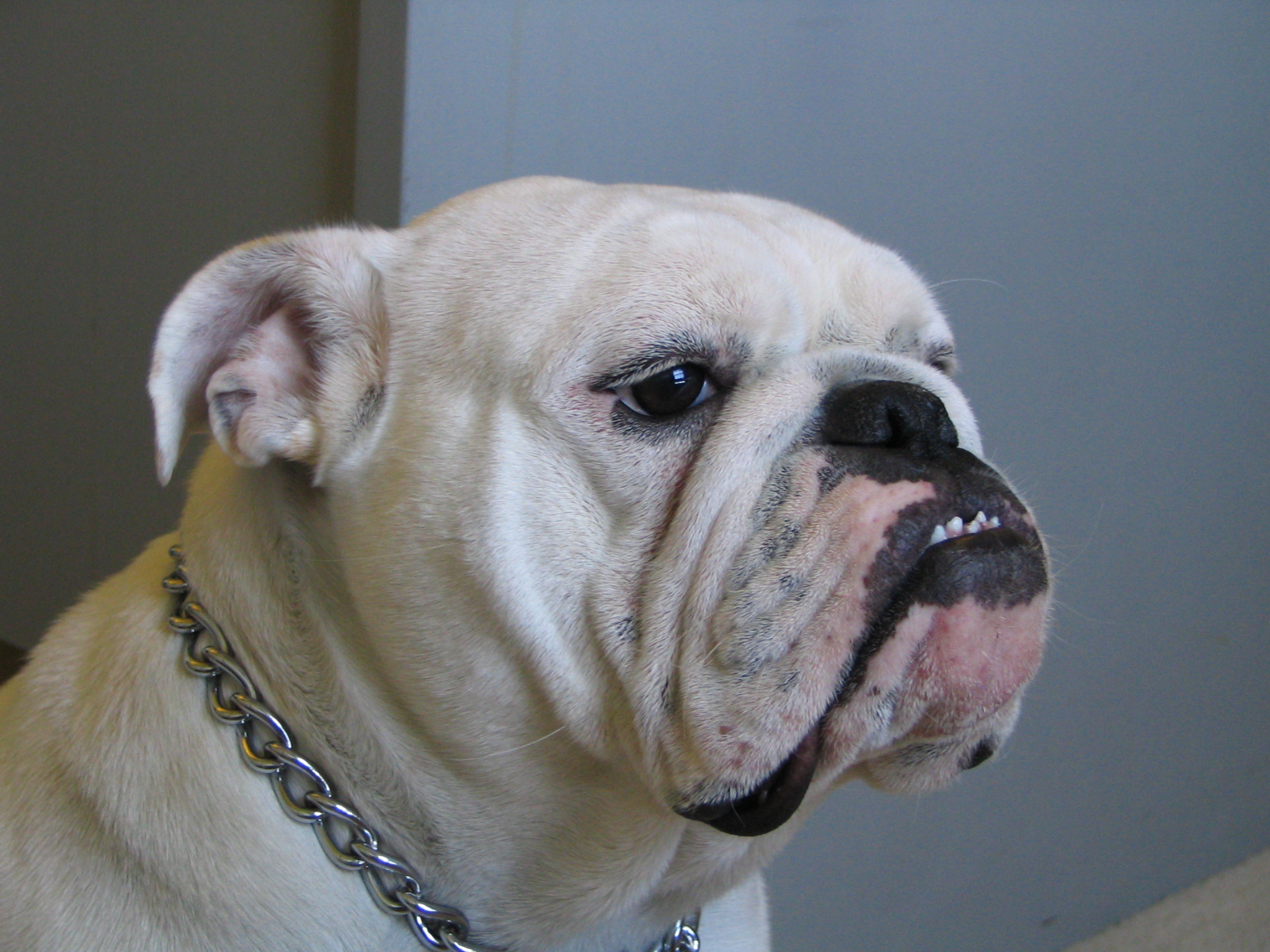
English bulldog with underbite

Veterinary dentistry involves the application of dental care to animals, encompassing not only the prevention of diseases and maladies of the mouth, but also considers treatment. In the United States, veterinary dentistry is one of 20 veterinary specialties recognized by the American Veterinary Medical Association.

Among other services, veterinary dentists perform endodontics, oral radiographs, and cosmetic and medically indicated surgeries. They address various conditions such as jaw fractures, malocclusions of the teeth, oral cancer, periodontal disease, and unique veterinary conditions like feline odontoclastic resorptive lesions.

Additionally, some animals have specialized dental workers like equine dental technicians, who perform routine dental work on horses.

== Oral disease ==
=== Periodontal disease ===
Inflammation of the deeper supporting tissues of the tooth and the surrounding tissues of the periodontium is the most prevalent and serious dental illness; it is also known as periodontal disease or periodontitis. Plaque, more especially subgingival plaque, forms in the gingival sulcus or periodontal pocket first. This permits bacteria to proliferate; the ensuing inflammation and the animal's immune system's reaction initiate the development of periodontal disease. The tooth's loss of attachment to the alveolar bone is the defining characteristic of periodontitis. Unless the animal receives treatment using sophisticated periodontal surgical procedures, periodontitis is an irreversible condition.

==== Consequences of periodontal disease ====
Periodontal disease ultimately leads to tooth loss; however, serious health issues may arise beforehand. Local effects can include the formation of an oronasal fistula or a periodontal-endodontic lesion, as well as infections or abscesses in the eye, a fractured jaw, osteomyelitis, and oral cancer.

Systemic effects impact various organs. For instance, bacteremia resulting from periodontal disease can trigger inflammation of the liver tissue, portal vein fibrosis, and cholestasis. Prolonged activation of the immune system may result in immune complexes accumulating in the kidneys, leading to glomerulonephritis, chronic kidney inflammation and subsequent scarring, reduced kidney function and filtration capacity, and chronic kidney disease. Additionally, bacteremia influences the heart, as circulating bacteria can adhere to the heart valves, increasing the risk of endocarditis, hypertension, and roughening of the heart tissue epithelium. There may also be metabolic alterations, such as insulin resistance, due to elevated levels of inflammatory proteins.

=== Gingivitis ===
Gingivitis is the initial phase of periodontal disease, characterized by inflammation of the gums caused by bacterial plaque. However, it can be prevented and reversed. It typically presents as a thin red line along the gum edges and may include symptoms such as swollen gums, bad breath, plaque, and tartar buildup. The first clinical indication of gingivitis is bleeding during probing, chewing, or brushing.

== Signs and symptoms of oral disease ==
The main signs of oral disease include:

- Halitosis
- Broken or discoloured teeth
- Changes in eating behaviour
- Rubbing or pawing at the face
- Ptyalism
- Bleeding from the mouth
- Inability or unwillingness to open or close the mouth
- Change in temperament
- Morbidity
- Weight loss

== Diagnosis ==
Many pet owners are often unaware that their pets have dental issues, which is why checking the oral cavity should be included in every physical checkup conducted by the veterinarian. The latest Canine Preventive Healthcare Guidelines and Feline Preventive Healthcare Guidelines from the American Animal Hospital Association (AAHA) and AVMA emphasize the importance of dental care as part of the evaluation during annual veterinary visits. A conscious animal's oral examination can provide limited insight, while a complete oral assessment can only be performed under general anesthesia. These evaluations should take place at least once a year to detect any concerns and maintain optimal oral health.

Assessing the entire animal, even if the main issue is the mouth, is standard practice. Certain dental conditions can stem from underlying systemic issues, and they can also lead to systemic complications that affect the kidneys, liver, and heart muscle. Since dental treatments necessitate general anesthesia, it's crucial to evaluate the patient's cardiovascular and respiratory health as well as their physiological parameters to minimize risks or complications.

=== Radiography ===
Radiographs (x-rays) may be required to assess the health of the jaw and the tooth roots situated beneath the gum line. The majority of dental diseases manifest below the gum line and remain unseen. Some reasons for conducting dental radiography include:

- Evaluation of bone levels and the type of bone loss resulting from periodontal disease.
- Examination of endodontic diseases, which encompasses apical pathology, pulp exposures, and draining fistulae.
- Investigation of the pathology affecting both the oral soft and hard tissues, such as tumors and fractures.
- Assessment of dysfunction in the temporomandibular joint.
- Analysis of crown/root pathology, which includes tooth resorptive lesions, fractures of the crown or root, additional roots, or dilacerated roots.
- Comparison of sites before and after tooth extractions.
- Root canal treatment.
- Oligodontia (the absence of most teeth) or the presence of supernumerary (extra) teeth.
- Evaluation of tooth development and the chronological dental age of the animal.

== Oral abnormalities, anomalies, and defects ==
=== Malocclusions ===
Malocclusion refers to the improper alignment of teeth when the jaw is closed. In dogs and cats that exhibit normal occlusion, the upper incisors are positioned in front of the lower incisors, the lower canines are situated in the diastema between the upper canine and the third incisor, the upper first premolars are located behind the lower first premolars, and the upper fourth premolars overlap the lower first molars. Any variations from this alignment are classified as malocclusions, which are categorized into different classes.

==== Class I malocclusion (MAL/1) ====
Also referred to as neutrocclusion, MAL/1 arises when the maxilla and mandible are proportionately aligned, yet one or more teeth are misaligned. This form of malocclusion is further categorized into types:

- Rostral cross bite (RXB) – one or more upper incisors are positioned such that they lie behind the lower incisors instead of in front. This condition may result from retained deciduous (baby) upper incisors, which hinder the normal eruption of adult incisors.
- Caudal cross bite (CXB) – the mandible is broader than the maxilla in the premolar region. Rather than the upper fourth premolar making contact with the inner cheek (buccal occlusion) and the lower first molar resting against the tongue (lingual occlusion), the positional relationship is inverted. This is frequently seen in dolichocephalic head types (characterized by a long skull).
- Linguoversion (LV) – the lower canines are situated in the correct anatomical position but are angled inward towards the tongue, potentially causing trauma to the palatal tissue (the roof of the mouth).
- Mesioversion (MV) – this occurs when a tooth is correctly positioned in the dental arch but is angled more forward than is typical.
- Labioversion (LABV) – this occurs when an incisor or canine tooth is correctly positioned in the dental arch but is angled towards the lips.
- Distoversion (DV) – this occurs when a tooth is correctly positioned in the dental arch but is angled further back than is usual.
- Buccoversion (BV) – this occurs when a tooth is correctly positioned in the dental arch but is angled outward towards the cheeks.

==== Class II malocclusion (MAL/2) ====
Also referred to as distoclusion, brachygnathism, overshot jaw, overbite, and parrot mouth, MAL/2 arises when the upper teeth are positioned in front of the lower ones. The maxilla is positioned forward (maxillary prognathism), while the mandible is situated behind (mandibular retrognathism). This condition is more prevalent in animals with dolichocephalic skull structures, such as Collies. It represents the most frequent oral birth defect observed in horses.

==== Class III malocclusion (MAL/3) ====
Also referred to as mesioclusion, prognathism, undershot jaw, and underbite, MAL/3 arises when the upper teeth are positioned behind the lower counterparts. In this condition, the maxilla is situated posteriorly (maxillary retrognathism) while the mandible is positioned anteriorly (mandibular prognathism). This malocclusion is more prevalent in animals that possess brachycephalic skull structures, such as pugs. Furthermore, this specific type of malocclusion is frequently linked to a rostral cross bite.

==== Other malocclusions ====
- Level bite – end-to-end bite of the incisors. Genetically is a degree of prognathism.
- Wry mouth – refers to a variety of unilateral occlusal abnormalities. Genetically only affects one quadrant of the mandible or maxilla, such as one segment of the jaw being disproportionately sized relative to the other half.
- Oligodontia – only a few teeth are present
- Anodontia – congenital absence of teeth
- Hypodontia – one or a few teeth are missing
- Polydontia – presence of more teeth than is normal (supernumerary teeth)
- Retained deciduous (baby) teeth – occurs when erupting permanent teeth do not push deciduous teeth out. This is common in toy breed dogs

=== Oral lesions and masses ===
==== Malignant tumors ====
- Melanoma – cancerous tumor that spreads to regional lymph nodes and lungs. Bone destruction is usually evident around the tumor. Most commonly observed in dogs; it is rare in cats.
- Squamous cell carcinoma – fast-growing tumor that is often ulcerated. It spreads slowly and invades bone tissue. It is the most common oral tumor in cats and second most common tumor in dogs.
- Fibrosarcoma – occurs at a younger age than other oral malignancies. It metastasizes slowly but is aggressively invasive. It is the second most common tumor in cats and third most common in dogs.
- Osteosarcoma – may affect the bones of the maxilla or mandible. Oral osteosarcoma is more responsive to surgical intervention than the appendicular version.

==== Nonmalignant tumors ====
- Epulis – general term for any gingival mass. A biopsy and radiograph is required in order to differentiate the type.
- Peripheral odontogenic fibroma – grows from the periodontal ligament. It contains no invasion of bone tissue and has a firm, smooth surface. It may cause tooth displacement. It is the most common benign tumor in dogs.
- Peripheral acanthomatous ameloblastoma – a slow-growing tumor that has a raised, cauliflower appearance and may transform into a malignant tumor at a later stage. It is usually invaded by surrounding bone tissue and aggressive surgical removal is required.

== See also ==
- Equine dentistry
- Horse teeth
- Dental health diets for dogs
- Dental health diets for cats
