= The Horseman's Word =

Fraternal secret society in Britain

The Horseman's Word, also known as the Society of Horsemen, is a fraternal secret society operating in Britain for those who work with horses. Established in north-eastern Scotland during the early nineteenth century, in ensuing decades it spread both to other parts of Scotland and into Eastern England. Although having largely declined by the mid-twentieth century, the society continues to exist in a diminished capacity within parts of Scotland.

Influenced by the formation of the Miller's Word and other friendly societies that based their structure on Freemasonry, the Horseman's Word was founded to cater to the growing number of individuals who worked with draught horses in north-eastern Scotland. Its members included horse trainers, blacksmiths, and ploughmen, all of whom were of lower economic and class status in Scottish society. The Horseman's Word acted as a form of trade guild or trade union, aiming to protect trade secrets, ensuring that its members were properly trained, and defending the rights of its members against the wealthier land-owners. The group also had a semi-religious dimension, teaching its members various rituals designed to provide them with the ability to control both horses and women.

Membership of the society required an initiation ceremony, during which Horsemen read passages from the Bible backwards, and the secrets included Masonic-style oaths, gestures, passwords and handshakes. Like the similar societies of the Miller's Word and the Toadmen, they were believed to have practiced witchcraft. In East Anglia, horsemen with these powers were sometimes called Horse Witches.

During the twentieth century, the Word attracted the attention of several folklorists and historians, among them J. M. McPherson, George Ewart Evans, and Hamish Henderson. Although a number of these scholars initially suggested that the society represented a survival of a pre-Christian religious order, later historical research established the group's nineteenth-century origins.

== History ==
=== Background ===
The Horseman's Word was one of a number of groups that emerged in Britain as part of a popular outgrowth from Freemasonry, which was commonly known as the "Mason's Word" in Scotland after the secret password that it used. Freemasonry had influenced a range of friendly societies and benefit clubs which were established with the purpose of providing working people with care if they fell sick or got old. Such groups included the Society of Oddfellows, Ancient Order of Druids, Ancient Order of Foresters, and Ancient Order of Royal Shepherds, all of whom adopted the initiatory structure and ceremonial elements found in Freemasonry. The Freemasons and these friendly societies were weakest in the rural hinterland of Scotland, and it was here that several groups emerged to cater for local conditions while embracing the basic Masonic model. In the eighteenth century, the Miller's Word had been established among members of the grain milling profession in Scotland. Designed to restrict entry to their trade, the Miller's Word formed into a system of local groups each of which had initiations, passwords, and internal secrets, also meeting at night and spreading the claim that they were in possession of magical powers that they acquired through reading the Bible backwards three times over a period of three years.

During the early nineteenth century, the draught horse became the primary working animal in the farming areas of Northern Scotland, replacing oxen in the hinterland of Aberdeen and the Moray Firth and ponies in Caithness and Orkney. As a result, the ability to raise and control these animals became a valued skill and people possessing this ability were in high demand. This created a desirable form of well paid and respectable work. The historian Timothy Neat characterised the horsemen as being largely "serious, practical men", while according to the esoteric publisher Ben Fernee, "unmarried ploughmen lived hard lives, drank hard, played rough and chased women."

=== Formation ===
"'The Horseman's Word' serves as the umbrella-title under which many horsemen organised themselves, for centuries, and through which they collated and handed down the art/science of horsemanship. Semi-secret horse societies were once widespread across Britain and particularly powerful in north east Scotland. They were bodies of men that acted as a primitive trade union, as a cooperative veterinary service, as a repository of traditional knowledge, and as folk clubs – long before that revivalist phrase came into being."

— Historian Timothy Neat, 2002

It was in this context that the Horseman's Word was founded. Aside from protecting trade knowledge, the Word wanted to ensure that those men who were engaged in the profession were efficiently trained, that the quality of their work was consistently good, and that the remunerations for that work were appropriate. It served as a trade union whose goal was to protect these horse trainers and ploughmen, along with their trade knowledge, from the threat of an encroaching economic system in which the resources for production were becoming privately owned and wages and prices for goods and services were being taken out of the control of skilled labourers and into the hands of large farm owners. As Fernee related, "The ploughmen did not own the land, the horses, the harness, the ploughs or their homes but they took control of the new technology, the horses, and ensured that only a brother of the Society of the Horseman's Word might work them."

In its structure, the Horseman's Word borrowed much from the Millers' Word, although rapidly became numerically larger and less exclusive.

The group gave men who otherwise were of lowly economic and class status a sense of personal and social authority based on their knowledge, skills, and occupational importance. Neat noted that it was also "a quasi-religious and mystical cult". The historian Ronald Hutton also described it as "a male anti-society, bent on deliberate misbehaviour in a private and controlled setting".

=== Spread and decline ===
During the course of the nineteenth century, the Horseman's Word spread from its heartlands and into both other areas of Scotland and then into eastern England. This spread was at least in part due to Scots migrating south and leasing or being employed in English farms. In England, the structure of the group and its rituals remained much the same, although its name was Anglicised to the Society of Horsemen. In England, the Word merged and absorbed many elements of traditional horse lore, for draught horses had replaced oxen in the country during the early modern period. The ability to control farm animals had been attributed to both witches and cunning folk in English folk tradition, and by the nineteenth-century there were various men operating in Britain who had gained renown for their alleged ability to control horses, such as the American James Samuel Rare and the English born Sydney Frederick Galvayne. These individuals were commonly known as "horse whisperers", a term that had been brought to England from Ireland in the early nineteenth century. The Word never gained the popularity in England that it had in Scotland. It has been estimated, for instance, that in Suffolk no more than one percent of farms contained men who were initiates of the group.

As literacy rates grew during the nineteenth century, information about horsemanship gained from published books filtered into the Word to supplement its oral traditions. The links that many horsemen had to British cavalry regiments also resulted in knowledge from the latter being adopted by the Word. Within Scotland, the Horseman's Word retained its cultural and social importance within rural communities until the mid-twentieth century. It gradually became the equivalent of a working men's club which was focused on the well-being of its members. As of the late 1990s it still existed in northern Scotland as a secret society of horse lovers. The present Baron Kilmarnock claims membership of the group, stating that he was initiated in Sandwick, Orkney in 1983.

== Praxes ==
=== Initiation ceremony ===
According to Neat, the initiation ceremony into the Horseman's Word was "a dramatic and memorable event". Its use of heightened language and ceremony created an atmosphere that made the event meaningful for its participants. The precise nature of the ceremony and the oaths used, differed according to the various groups, although all had a clear basis in Freemasonry. Severe punishments were specified for any breach of the oath. The Horseman's Word borrowed much from the Miller's Word initiation ceremony where bread and whisky were given as pseudo sacraments and the inductee was blindfolded. The Word's members did however add their own designs in the form of passwords, oaths, and the ordeals chosen as part of the initiation ceremony.

"So help me Lord to keep my secrets and perform my duties as a horseman. If I break any of them – even the last of them – I wish no less than to be done to me than my heart be torn from my breast by two wild horses, and my body quartered in four and swung on chains, and the wild birds of the air left to pick my bones, and these then taken down and buried in the sands of the sea, where the tide ebbs and flows twice every twenty four hours – to show I am a deceiver of the faith. Amen."

— The Horseman's Creed, as recorded as part of an initiation ceremony in Angus.

Among the Horseman's Word group in Angus, initiation ceremonies typically took place at night, preferably at the time of the full moon, in an isolated barn, byre, stable, or steading. An individual known as the High Horseman would be seated in this space, holding a cloven goat's hoof in his hand; he would preside over the ceremony. The apprentice was then stripped to the waist and blindfolded, and spun around by his fellows in order to disorient him before being brought into the ceremonial space and made to stand before the High Horseman. The High Horseman asked a series of set questions of his fellows at which they responded with a series of set answers. Turning to the initiate, who is made to kneel and has his blindfold removed, the High Horseman then commanded the newcomer to provide vows to keep to the group's secrets. This achieved, all those assembled then recited the Horseman's Creed, which reminded them of the punishments that should befall them should they break their vows. Following the ceremony, a ceilidh was held in which toasts were made and the assembled horsemen drank from whisky that the apprentice had been required to bring with him.

The diabolist elements of the initiation ceremonies of both the Millers' Word and Horseman's Word might have been a deliberate parody of Presbyterianism, a form of Protestant Christianity that was then dominant in much of Scotland. Similarly, its embrace of drunkenness, jokes, songs, and toasts may have served as a deliberate mockery of the area's conventional morality. The historian Ronald Hutton suggested that these diabolical elements may have derived in part from folk stories of the witches' sabbath, which could have been absorbed either directly from Scottish folklore or from published accounts discussing witchcraft.

Prior to the initiation ceremony the candidate, often a ploughboy, was told to come to the barn where the ceremonial procedures were to take place, normally held between 11pm and 1 am. Once at the door he was blindfolded and taken before the master of ceremonies, who was often an elder ploughman. As in Masonic rituals there was then a prearranged and established exchange of questions and answers that was to be given. In the case of the Horseman's Word and the Miller's Word this exchange was often a parody of catechism. After this was completed the inductee was then asked to seal the pact and shake hands with the devil, which would often be a branch or pole covered in animal fur. A common aspect of the initiation was a trick played on the postulant; after they had been made to swear that they would never reveal the hidden word that was the alleged source of the group's power, they would later be commanded to write it down. If he tried to do so, thereby breaking his oath, he would be flogged across his back or knuckles.

=== The Word ===
After the candidate completed the initiation ceremony he was then given a word that was supposed to give him power over horses. "The Horseman's Word" was an actual spoken word. This secret word, which varied by location, was said to have magical and mystical qualities which would allow the keeper of the word to possess the ability by merely whispering it to bring horses under their complete control. Apart from gaining knowledge of the secret word, more practical information and techniques about controlling and training horses was also passed on to members of the society. These methods were kept secret and done in such a way that the horsemen maintained their reputations as having unique and even magical power over horses.

Neat stated that the Horseman's Word was "infused with verbal richness that would have thrilled" William Shakespeare or Robert Burns.

=== Techniques and secrets of the Horseman's Word ===
"Question: Who caught the first horse?

Answer: It was Adam.

Question: Where did he catch him?

Answer: At the east side of the garden of Eden, in the way of the Land of Nod."

— Quote from a Horseman’s Word ritual.

Until the initiation ceremony and induction into the society and the receiving of the word, the horseman who were not members of the society but potential candidates would have trouble with horses. This would often be caused by older ploughmen who were members of the society tampering with their horses. They would put things like tacks under the horse's collar to cause it to behave irrationally. This would be unknown to the potential candidate as the techniques for training and controlling the horses were not yet given to him. Most of these techniques were based on the horse's sharp sense of smell. Foul substances placed in front of the horse or on the animal itself would cause it to refuse to move forward. This technique is known as jading and is still used by horse trainers today. There were also pleasant smelling things that were used to make a horse move forward or calm down. If the substance was an oil it could be wiped on the trainer's forehead, they would then stand in front of the animal and the smell would draw it towards them. This practice was often used in taming unruly horses. There were also pleasant smelling and inviting materials, such as sweets, that the horseman could keep in their pocket in order to calm, attract, and subdue a crazed horse. Keeping these techniques secret, along with the myth that there was a word that only the horseman knew that gave them and them alone power over horses helped guarantee their reputation, prestige, job security, and pay. The same type of logic and protection of trade secrets can be seen among modern magicians who keep their tricks secret and only share them with other members of their trade.

One critic of the Society, a ploughman who later became a grocer and published a book entitled Eleven Years at Farm Work; being a true tale of farm servant life (1879), claimed that "Without betraying any secret, it may be said the real philosophy of the horseman's word, consists in the thorough, careful, and kind treatment of the animals, combined with a reasonable amount of knowledge of their anatomical and physiological structure."

== Legacy ==
=== Historical study ===
In the twentieth century, a number of scholars began to study the history and origins of the Society. The first of these, J.M. McPherson, published his findings and theories in his Primitive Beliefs in the North-East of Scotland (1929), in which he outlined the idea that it was a survival of an ancient pagan cult that had been persecuted in the witch trials in the Early Modern period. Such ideas were supported by the folklorist Thomas Davidson in an article of his published on the subject of the Horseman's Word (1956), and then by George Ewart Evans, who purported the theory in four books of his published in the 1960s and 1970s. Neither Davidson nor Evans had examined the Horseman's Word through the original Scottish sources, while McPherson had only relied upon observations made in the late nineteenth century.

Nonetheless, around the same time that Evans was publishing his theory of a pagan survival, there were also researchers who had examined the origins of the Society and criticised the idea that it had ancient roots. In 1962, Hamish Henderson detailed how it had arisen in the eighteenth century, with his information being expanded upon by Ian Carter in his 1979 study of agricultural life in Scotland.

In 2009, The Society of Esoteric Endeavour published a compilation of nineteenth and early twentieth century texts about the Society in a volume entitled The Society of the Horseman's Word. Limited to an edition of one thousand copies, the first hundred copies contained an envelope inside within which was contained a piece of horse hair knotted in exactly the same manner as that which was originally used to invite prospective members into the Society.

== See also ==
- Magical organization
- Neopagan witchcraft
- Secret society
