= Equine dentistry =

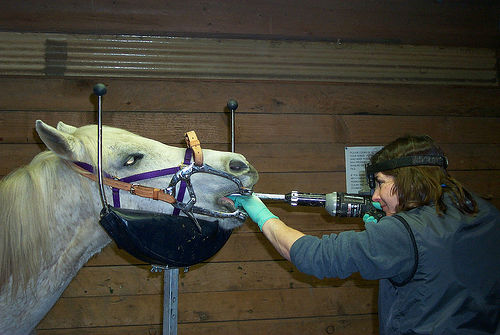
A veterinary physician performing dental work on a grey mare

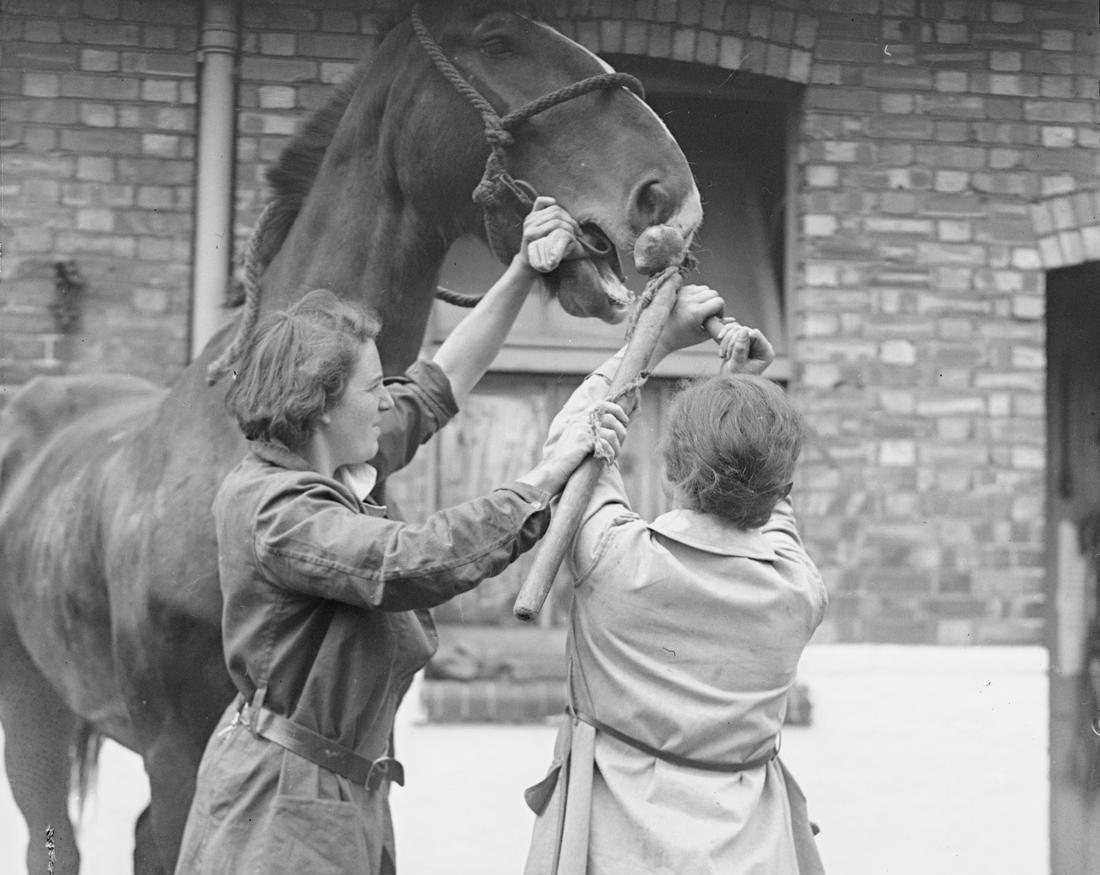
Two veterinarians attending to the teeth of an army horse in London during World War I

Equine dentistry is the practice of dentistry in horses, involving the study, diagnosis, prevention, and treatment of diseases, disorders and conditions of the oral cavity, maxillofacial area and the adjacent and associated structures.

The practice of equine dentistry varies widely by jurisdiction, with procedures being performed by veterinary physicians (both in general and specialist practice), specialist professionals termed equine dental technicians or equine dentists, and by amateurs, such as horse owners, with varying levels of training.

In some jurisdictions, the practice of equine dentistry, or specific elements of equine dentistry, may be restricted only to specialists with specified qualifications or experience, whereas in others it is not controlled.

== History ==
Equine dentistry was practiced as long ago as 600 BCE in China, and has long been important as a method of assessing the age of a horse. This was also practiced in ancient Greece, with many scholars making notes about equine dentistry, including Aristotle with an account of periodontal disease in horses in his History of Animals, and in Rome with Vegetius writing about equine dentistry in his manuscript "The Veterinary Art".

In later years, the importance of dentition in assessing the age of horses led to veterinary dentistry being used a method of fraud, with owners and traders altering the teeth of horses to mimic the tooth shapes and characteristics of horses younger than the actual age of the equine.

The first veterinary dental school was founded in Lyon, France, in 1762 and created additional knowledge about dentistry in horses and other animals.

== Equine dental technicians ==
Equine dental technicians (also known colloquially as equine dentists, although this is not reflective of their official title) are veterinary paraprofessionals who specialize in routine dental work on horses, especially procedures such as rasping the sharp edges of teeth, also known as 'floating'.

Scope of practice may be dictated by statute. For instance, in the United Kingdom, any person, without any qualification may examine and rasp horses' healthy teeth with manual tools, remove deciduous caps (baby teeth) or remove supragingival calculus, whereas only qualified equine dental technicians or vets may remove teeth, rasp fractured teeth and use motorized dental instruments.

== Relationship between vets and lay practitioners ==
There has been a long history of animosity between fully qualified vets and those lay people performing equine dentistry. This has led in some cases to an increase in voluntary and regulatory schemes in the sector. In the UK in the early 1990s, the veterinary profession engaged with lay practitioners to establish a formal system of examination and a register of qualified professionals. Whilst not compulsory, qualified persons were given an extended scope of practice for procedures normally reserved to vets.

In the United States, lay practitioners have been subject to legal action to gain injunctions against their practice, with case law in states including Missouri effectively precluding the practice of equine dentistry by persons other than vets.

== See also ==
- Paraveterinary workers
- Horse teeth
