= Modified Triadan system =

Veterinary tooth numbering system

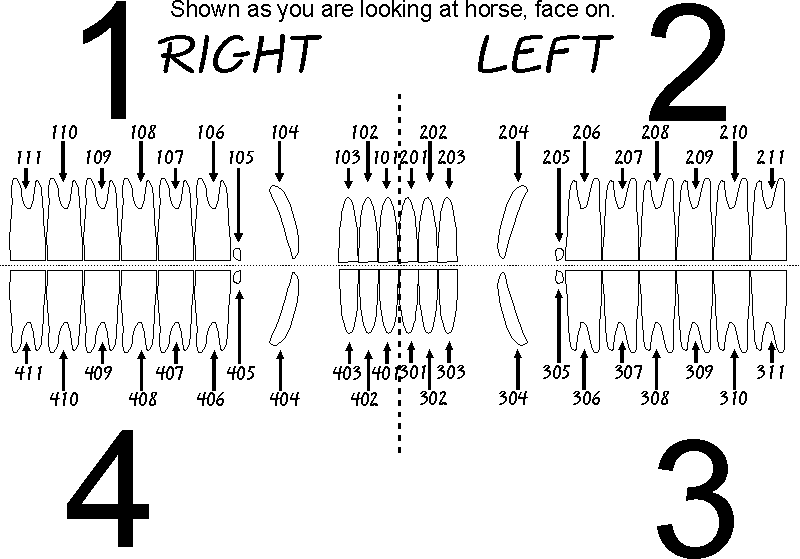
Modified Triadan system of dental nomenclature in the adult horse.

The modified Triadan system is a scheme of dental nomenclature that can be used widely across different animal species. It is used worldwide among veterinary surgeons.

Each tooth is given a three digit number (eg. 203).

The first number relates to the quadrant of the mouth in which the tooth lies:

1. upper right
2. upper left
3. lower left
4. lower right

If it is a deciduous tooth that is being referred to, then a different number is used:

5. upper right
6. upper left
7. lower left
8. lower right

The second and third numbers refer to the location of the tooth from rostral to caudal. This starts at 01 and goes up to 11 for many species, depending on the total number of teeth. In each quadrant, a "full mouthed" animal has 3 incisors, 1 canine, 4 premolars, and 3 molars. When numbering teeth in species which are not full mouthed (eg. domestic cats), it is helpful to note that the canine will always be numbered 4 and the first molar will always be numbered 9.
