= Serial extraction =

Serial extraction is the planned extraction of certain deciduous teeth and specific permanent teeth in an orderly sequence and predetermined pattern to guide the erupting permanent teeth into a more favorable position.

== History ==
In 1929, Kjellgren of Sweden used the term "serial extraction" for the first time. In the 1940s the technique was popularised in the United States by Hayes Nance as “planned and progressive extraction”. Nance is known as the Father of serial extraction in the United States. In 1970 Hotz in Switzerland called it active "supervision of teeth by extraction."

== Procedure ==
There is no fixed technique to be followed while carrying out serial extractions. Careful diagnosis and continuous re-evaluation during the course of treatment is mandatory to achieve required results.

However based on the usual eruption sequence of teeth, deciduous canines are extracted at the age of 8–9 years to create space for proper alignment of incisors, followed by extraction of deciduous first molars a year later so that the eruption of first premolars is accelerated and lastly extraction of the erupting first premolars to give space for the alignment of permanent canines. In some cases a modified technique is followed in which the first premolars are enucleated at the time of extraction of the deciduous first molar. This modification is frequently necessary in the mandibular arch where the canines often erupt before the first premolars.

== Selection of suitable extraction procedure ==
Extracting the primary canines only – it produces rapid self-improvement in incisor crowding and alignment intercepting the development of lingual crossbite of the lateral incisors.

Extracting the first primary molars only – this approach produces the earlier eruption of first premolars but reduces the rapidity and amount of incisor alignment. This is the result of retention of primary canines.

Extracting both primary canines and first molars – this is a compromise between rapid improvement in incisor alignment and the desired early eruption of first premolars. In some cases this sequence results in simultaneous eruption of canines and first premolar, which may cause an increased distal translation of the permanent canines and possible impaction of first premolars.

Enucleation of first premolar buds – it is advocated when first premolar eruption is behind that of canines and second premolars. This allows maximal distal translation of the erupting canines.it is rarely indicated in the maxillary arch.

== Indications ==
- In cases of class 1 malocclusion that show harmony between skeletal and muscular system
- Cases which present with arch length deficiency – indicated by the presence of one or more of the following:
  - Absence of physiologic spacing
  - Unilateral or bilateral premature loss of deciduous canines with midline shift
  - Malpositioned or impacted lateral incisors that erupt palatally out of the arch
  - Markedly irregular or crowded maxillary and mandibular anteriors
  - Localized gingival recession in the mandibular anterior region
  - Ectopic eruption of teeth
  - Mesial migration of buccal segment
  - Abnormal eruption pattern and sequence
  - Mandibular anterior flaring
  - Ankylosis of one or more teeth
- Cases with insufficient growth to overcome the tooth material – basal bone discrepancy.
- Patients with straight profile and pleasing appearance.

== Contraindications ==
- Class 2 and class 3 malocclusion with skeletal abnormalities.
- Patients with adequate spacing in dentition
- Cases of anodontia/oligodontia
- Patients with open bite and deep bite
- In cases of midline diastema
- Class 1 malocclusion with minimal space deficiency
- Unerupted malformed teeth e.g. dilacerations
- Extensive caries or heavily filled first permanent molars
- Mild disproportion between arch length and tooth material that can be treated by proximal stripping

== Advantages ==
- Treatment is more physiologic
- Psychological trauma can be avoided by treatment at an early age
- Reduces the duration of fixed orthodontic treatment
- Better oral hygiene is possible, so reduced risk of caries
- Health of investing tissues (periodontium and alveolar process) is preserved, therefore reduced alveolar bone loss
- Less retention period is indicated
- More stable results are achieved
- Less potential iatrogenic damage
- Normal neuromuscular balance is achieved and maintained

== Disadvantages ==
- There is no single approach that can be universally applied to all patients
- Treatment time is prolonged as the treatment is carried out in stages spread over 2–3 years
- Patient has a tendency to develop tongue thrust, due to creation of extraction spaces that close gradually
- Extraction of posterior teeth may lead to deepening of bite
- There is a risk of arch length reduction because of mesial migration of the buccal segment
- Minor spaces may exist between canine and second premolar
- Axial inclination of the teeth may change at the end of serial extraction

== Assessments to be made before contemplation of serial extraction ==
=== Intraoral diagnostic assessment ===
The diagnosis is based on a thorough case history, clinical examination of the patient, photographs, plaster study models, cephalometric radiographs, panoramic and periapical radiographs.

=== Growth and development analysis ===
Periodic growth assessment records should be made in all patients where growth is still going on i.e. made until 14 to 16 year old in girls and 18 to 19 year old in boys.

=== Functional analysis ===
Checking various functional movements like swallowing, respiration, speech, opening and closing and excursive movements of the mandible and careful palpation of both temporomandibular jointsis important.

=== Morphologic assessment ===
It includes assessment of tooth mass, arch form, arch length, skeletal pattern, skeletal growth potential, orofacial musculature, facial aesthetics, oral habits and hereditary assessment of parents and siblings. The most favorable morphologic factors for serial extraction include class 1 malocclusion, a favorable morphogenetic pattern – one that does not change, a flush terminal plane or a mesial step relationship of the primary second molars, minimum overjet and minimum overbite.

=== Space analysis ===
Assessment of the tooth size – arch length relationship in the mixed dentition determines the presence or absence of any future or existing discrepancy, whether it is crowding or spacing. It involves the prediction of tooth size of the unerupted permanent canines and premolars. A caliper or a fine line divider is used to measure the combined width of teeth in each segment using study models. The circumferential measurement is made on the plaster cast from mesial aspect of first molar on one side to the mesial aspect of the first molar on the opposite side, and this measurement is recorded. Combined width of the permanent teeth is taken from intraoral radiographs and compared with the available arch length.

==== Factors to be considered in space analysis ====
- A curve of occlusion formula is used to determine the additional space required to flatten the curve of spee.
- For every 1 degree of labial or lingual tipping of the mandibular incisors there is 0.8 mm of respective increase or decrease in arch length.
- The clinical image of the patient involves the interpretation of that individual’s own data because patients represent multiracial origins and therefore a unified norm is difficult to determine.

== Factors to consider during serial extraction ==
- Serial extraction should be limited essentially to class 1 malocclusion with an initial normal sagittal jaw relationship and normal neuromuscular balance. It is the objective of this treatment to maintain the neuromuscular balance.
- With the proper diagnostic assessment skilled timing and careful monitoring, programmed serial extraction procedures are capable of producing extensive amounts of permanent tooth translation. The earlier the first premolars are removed, the greater the distal eruption of the permanent canines.
- Too much uprighting of the incisors in the available space can result in too flat a face caused by the dishing in of the anterior segment. The mandibular anterior teeth must be stabilized to prevent excessive lingual tipping. A fixed mandibular arch from the left first permanent molar to the right first permanent molar may be required.
- Judicious reproximation disking of primary teeth with no tooth extraction is an occasional option. This decision depends on the careful tooth size-arch length evaluation.
- The amount of crowding, the arch length requirements, whether they are symmetric, and the state of health of the investing tissues are factors that continually impact the occlusal guidance program.
- Sometimes removal of second premolars or mandibular second premolars and maxillary first premolars may be preferred, depending on facial balance, anchorage requirements, size of tooth and other factors.
- Serial extraction is a multi-decisional, time linked process. Annual records such as panoramic radiographs, photographs and study models are essential.
- The most common unfavorable sequel of serial extraction is deepening of bite. Uprighting of incisors and early loss of posterior teeth may result in deep bite. A simple palatal bite plate may correct this problem.
- Paralleling the roots of teeth contiguous to the extraction sites is usually easy with the autonomous approximation to various degrees before mechanotherapy.
- Retention demands are significantly less following serial extraction. However it is better to follow a regular retention regimen for the first six months against possible relapse of rotations and to allow settling of the occlusion. A maxillary Hawley type retainer and a bonded mandibular canine to canine retainer make an efficient retention regimen.

== See also ==
- Retainer (orthodontics)
- Malocclusion
