= Orthodontic headgear =

Orthodontic device used to correct bite

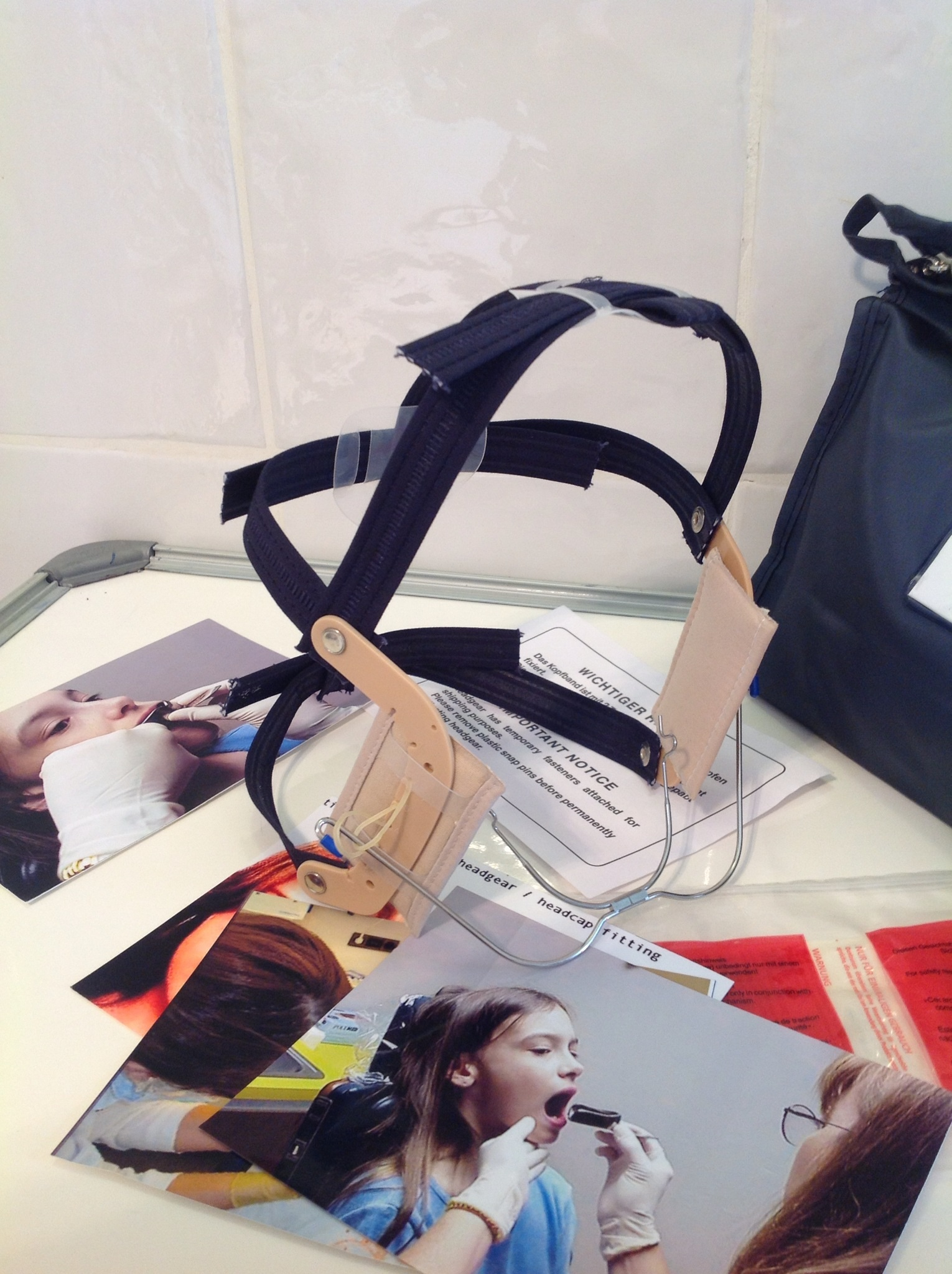
Full view of combination pull orthodontic headgear with facebow

Orthodontic headgear is a type of orthodontic appliance typically attached to the patient's head with a strap or number of straps around the patient's head or neck. From this, a force is transferred to the mouth/jaw(s) of the subject.

Headgear is used to correct bite and support proper jaw alignment and growth. It is typically recommended for children whose jaw bones are still growing.

Unlike braces, headgear is worn partially outside of the mouth. An orthodontist may recommend headgear for a patient if their bite is more severely out of alignment. The device typically transfers the force to the teeth via a facebow or J hooks to the patient's dental braces or a palatal expander that aids in correcting more severe bite problems or is used in retention of the teeth and jaws of the patient.

== Need for treatment and concurrent corrections ==
Headgear is most commonly used to correct the bite of the patient. The headgear attaches to the braces via metal hooks or a facebow. Straps or a head cap anchor the headgear to the back of the head or neck. In some situations, both are used.

Elastic bands are used to apply pressure to the bow or hooks. Its purpose is to slow or stop the upper jaw from growing, thereby preventing or correcting an overjet.

Other forms of headgear treat reverse overjets, in which the top jaw is not forward enough. It is similar to a facemask, also attached to braces, and encourages forward growth of the upper jaw.

Headgear can also be used to make more space for teeth to come in. In this instance the headgear is attached to the molars, via molar headgear bands and tubes, and helps to draw the molars backwards in the mouth, opening up space for the front teeth to be moved back using braces and bands. Multiple appliances and accessories are typically used along with the headgear, such as: power chains, coil springs, twin blocks, plates or retainers, facemasks, a headgear helmet (a headgear helmet is a cervical headgear with a cap or rigid helmet that covers the entire head), lip bumpers, palate expanders, elastics, bionaters, Herbst appliances, Wilson appliances, other headgear, hybrid twinblocks, positioner retainers, and jasper jumpers. Many patients wear a combination of, or all of these appliances at any given time in their treatment.

== Forms of headgear treatment ==
Headgear needs to be worn between 12 and 23 hours each day to be effective in correcting the overbite, typically for 12 to 18 months depending on the severity of the overbite, how much it is worn and what growth stage the patient is in. Typically however the prescribed daily wear time will be between 14 and 16 hours a day.

Orthodontic headgear will usually consist of three major components:

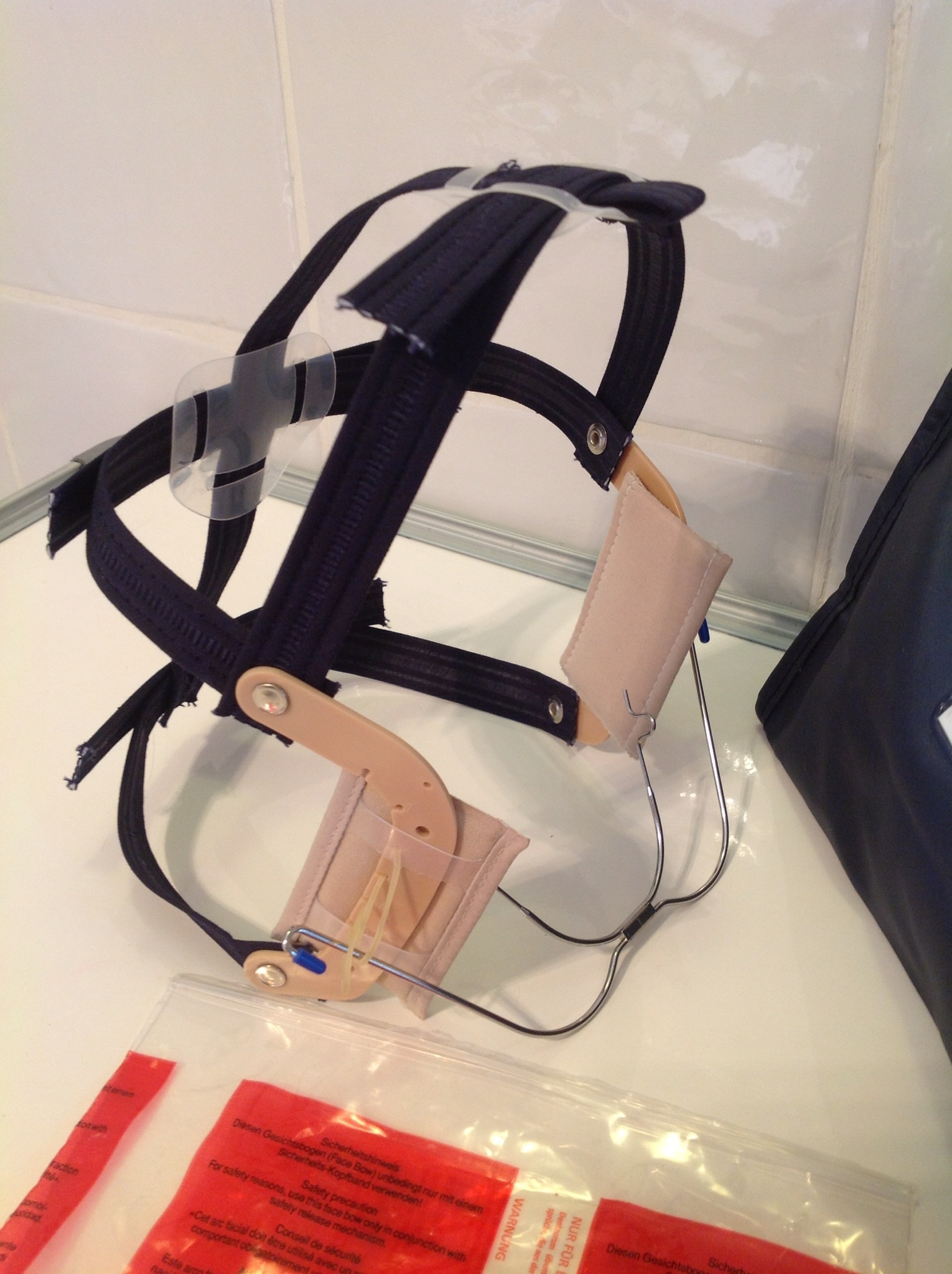
Full orthodontic headgear with headcap, fitting straps, facebow and elastics

1. Facebow: first, the facebow (or J-Hooks) is fitted with a metal arch onto headgear tubes attached to the rear upper and lower molars. This facebow then extends out of the mouth and around the patients face. J-Hooks are different in that they hook into the patients mouth and attach directly to the brace (see photo for example of J-Hooks).
2. Head cap: the second component is the headcap, which typically consists of one or a number of straps fitting around the patients head. This is attached with elastic bands or springs to the facebow. Additional straps and attachments are used to ensure comfort and safety (see photo).
3. Attachment: the third and final component – typically consisting of rubber bands, elastics, or springs – joins the facebow or J-Hooks and the headcap together, providing the force to move the upper teeth, jaw backwards.

Soreness of teeth when chewing or when the teeth touch is typical. Patients usually feel the soreness to 2 to 3 hours later, but younger patients tend to react sooner, (e.g., 1 to 1 1/2 hours). The headgear application is one of the most useful appliances available to the orthodontist when looking to correct a Class II malocclusion.

== Facemask and reverse-pull headgear ==
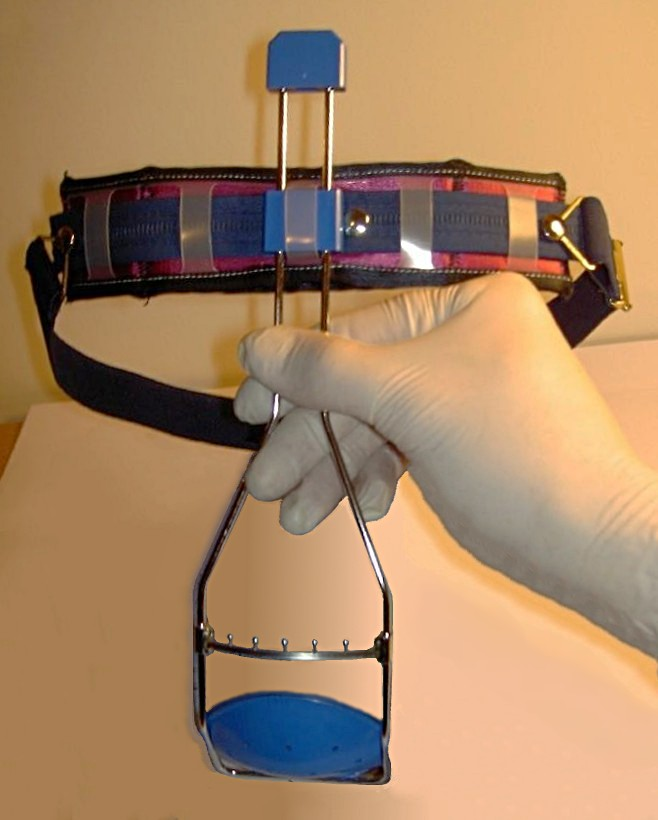
Facemask or reverse-pull headgear with straps hooks for connection of elastic bands into the patients mouth, typically worn 12 to 23 hours a day.

Facemask or reverse-pull headgear is an orthodontic appliance typically used in growing patients to correct underbites (technically termed Class-III orthodontic problems) by pulling forward and assisting the growth of the upper jaw (maxilla), allowing it to catch up to the size of the lower jaw (mandible). These appliances effectively serve to pull the patient's teeth forward.

Facemasks or reverse-pull headgear needs to be worn between 12 and 23 hours per day, but typically a period of 14 to 16 hours each day is effective in correcting the underbite.

Overall wear time is usually anywhere from 12 to 18 months depending on the severity of the bite and how much a patient's jaws and bones are growing over this time.

The appliance normally consists of a frame or a center bars that are strapped to the patient's head during a fitting appointment. The frame has a section which is positioned in front of the patient's mouth, which allows for the attachment of elastic or rubber bands directly into the mouth area. These elastics are then hooked onto the patient's braces (brackets and bands) or appliance fitted in his or her mouth. This creates the prescribed pulling force in order to pull the upper jaw forward.

The orthodontic facemask typically consists of three major components:

1. Face frame: first, the face frame is a metal and plastic structure which is adjusted to fit onto the patient's face. The frame is normally stabilized on the child's face with the aid of a chin cup and a forehead pad. These are padded to ensure patient comfort. (Designs that do not require any form of chin cup also exist.) The frame typically has a horizontal bar or mouth-yoke, which the orthodontist will adjust so it is correctly positioned in front of the patient's mouth to get the elastics to apply the force in the desired direction. The mouth yoke has a number of hooks (four to six depending on type of appliance, see photo with six hooks), which allows the orthodontist to attach elastics or springs directly into from the facemask into the patient's mouth. The frame allows the patient to move his or her head freely and to talk. All other oral activities are typically limited or restricted, such as eating or playing sports or playing a wind musical instruments, although drinking is recommended using a straw so as not to remove the whole appliance at night or in the day when thirsty.
2. Head cap: some facemasks and all reverse-pull headgear have a second part which consists of a head cap, and is made up of a number of straps fitting around the patient's head. In this case the head cap is used to stabilize the face-frame described above and to ensure it is held correctly in position (see photo example of reverse-pull headgear with head-strap/cap).
3. Attachment: the third and final component is the mouth attachment – typically using rubber bands – joins the facemask from the mouth-yoke into the patient's mouth. The elastics hook on the patient's braces or other such suitable oral appliance. As the elastics are flexible, up to six elastics may be used to provide various forward and sideways forces on the patient's teeth and arch, while still allowing the patient to open and close his or her jaw.

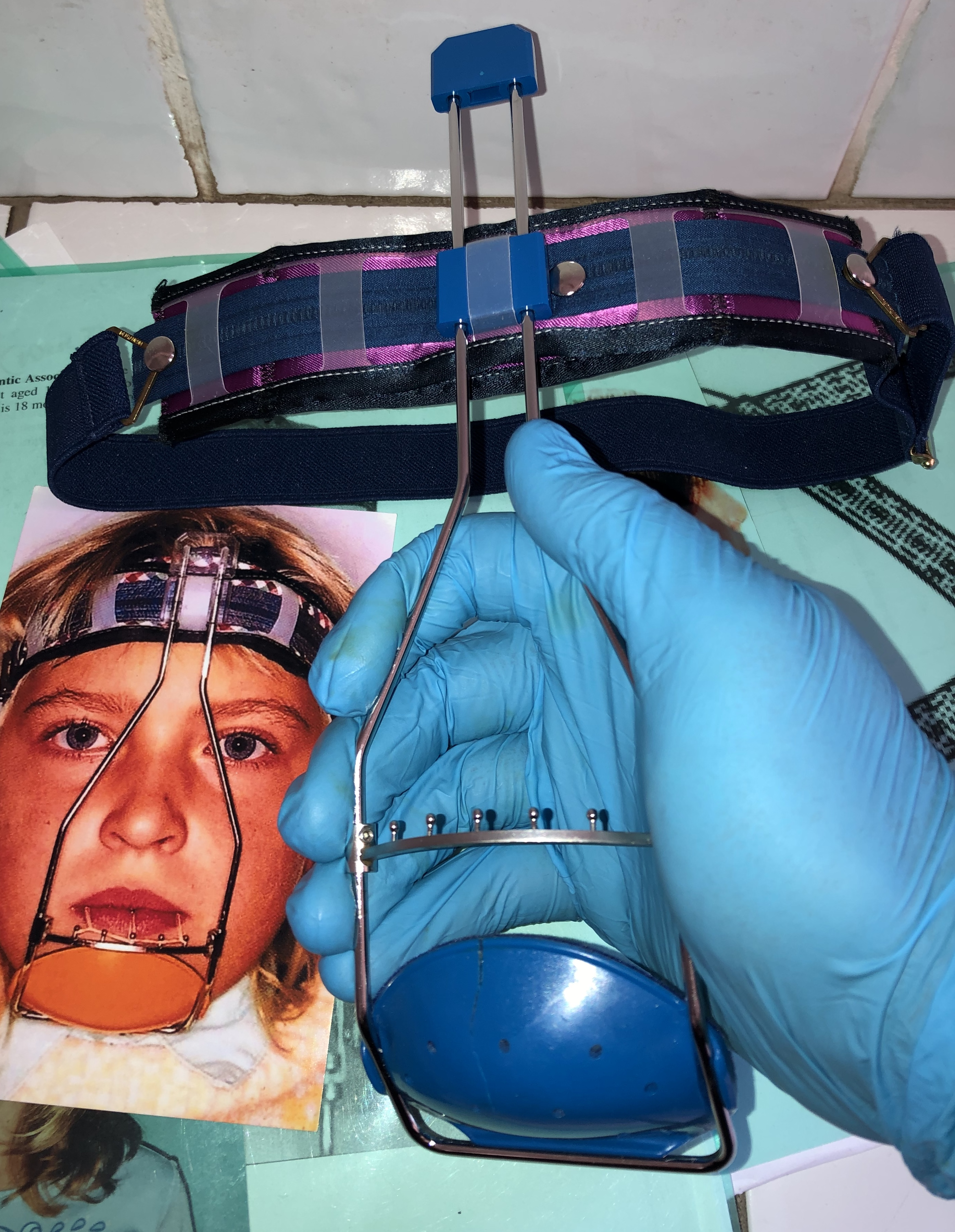
Facemask or reverse-pull headgear shows preparation for fitting to a patient with a number of elastic bands into the patients mouth.

In some cases surgery is required in conjunction with a facemask or reverse-pull headgear. Many parents and doctors recommend using early intervention (typically between ages 7 to 13) by using a facemask to avoid costly and painful surgical procedures later.

The appliance is very effective in correcting Class III orthodontic problems in younger or adolescent patients that are still growing. Initially, it can be difficult for children to wear a mask or headgear, however most doctors and parents agree that children and adolescence adapt quickly to such changes and requirements.

Parents should be aware that their child is often better-off wearing a facemask or headgear to avoid later surgery and the patient, friends and school peers normally get used to the new appliance after just a few weeks of wear.

== Adverse effects and controversy ==
Researchers who have studied the long-term effects of orthodontic headgear have found that it may flatten the face and prevent the chin from coming forward, pushing both the upper and lower jaw down and back, into the airway. In more technical terms, it inhibits the natural growth of the jaws and lead to a reduction in the SNA and ANB angles, which relate to the forward position of the maxilla and the mandible. These measurements are good indicators of the size of a person's airway.

The controversy about headgear intensified beginning in the 1980s when formerly headgear treated patients developed severe health symptoms, such as sleep apnea, breathing problems and acute TMD.

In some cases, eye injuries have been reported, which is minimized with the use of safety release straps and safety facebows.

Teenagers prescribed orthodontic headgear often face social stigma and bullying if seen wearing these appliances. Because of the difficulties in complying with daytime wear of headgear, these appliances are mainly worn in the evenings and while sleeping.

The need for headgear in orthodontics and its application by practitioners has somewhat decreased in recent years as some orthodontists use temporary implants (i.e., temporary anchorage devices) inside the patient's mouth to perform the same tooth movements. However, the headgear is still widely used and a very effective appliance used by orthodontists today.

Soreness of teeth when chewing, or when the teeth touch, is typical. Adults usually feel the soreness 12 to 24 hours later, but younger patients tend to react sooner, (e.g., 2 to 6 hours). Adults are sometimes prescribed headgear but this is less frequent.
