= Facemask (orthodontics) =

Orthodontic headgear

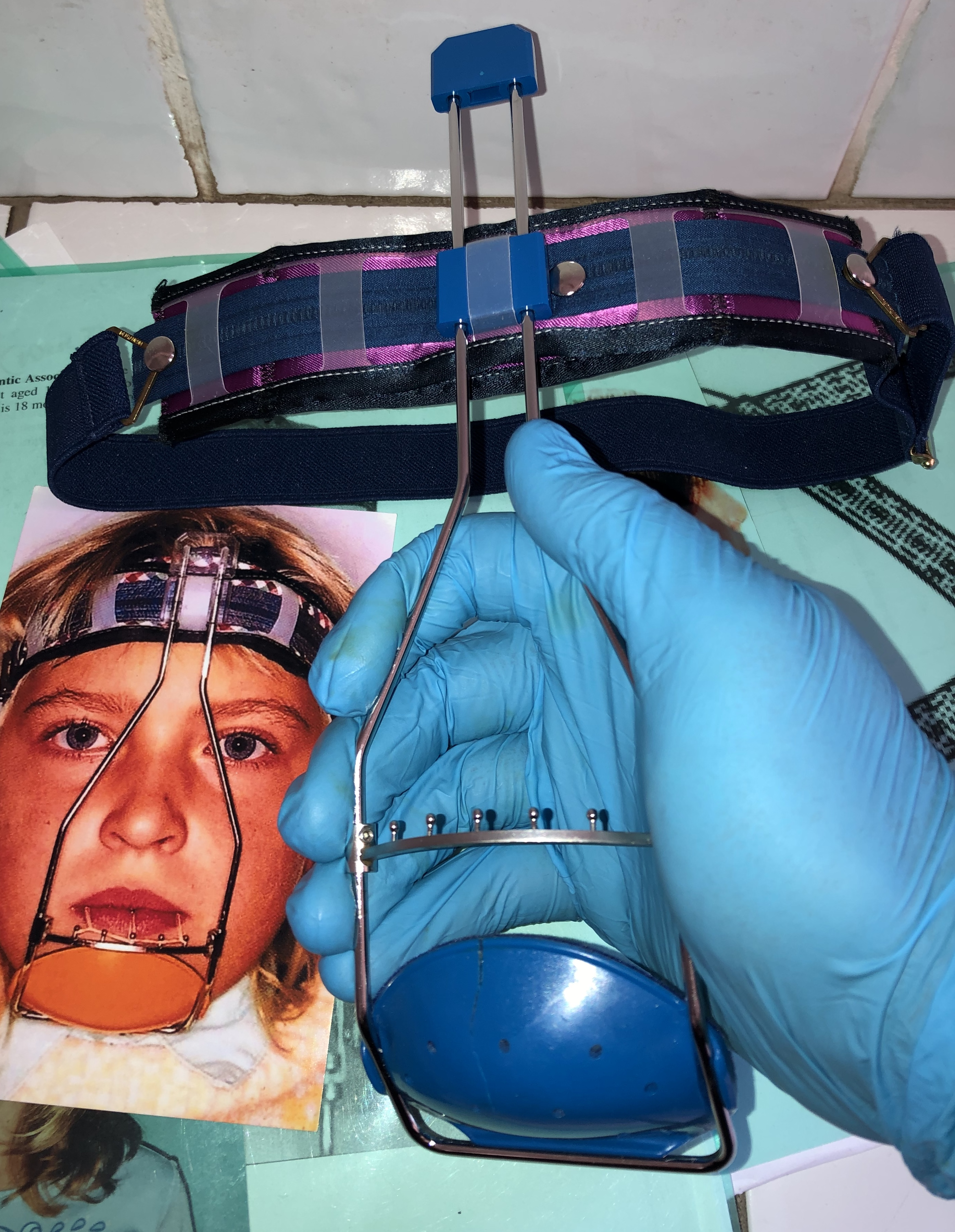
Teenage patient been fitted with her orthopedic / orthodontic facemask - required wear-time 16 hours daily.

A facemask (also referred to as a protraction facemask, orthopedic facemask, or reverse-pull headgear) is a type of an orthodontic headgear used to treat underbite and other malocclusions where the upper jaw is too far backwards. A metal bar sits in front of the patients face with support from the forehead and chin. Elastics are connected to the metal bar and the teeth - directly through the lips / mouth of the patient. The elastics apply forward and downward pressure on the upper jaw. Thus the force direction is the opposite from a standard headgear which is why this appliance is also known as a reverse-pull-headgear.

This facemask appliance needs to worn by the patient for between 14 and 16 hours daily.

== Additional images ==
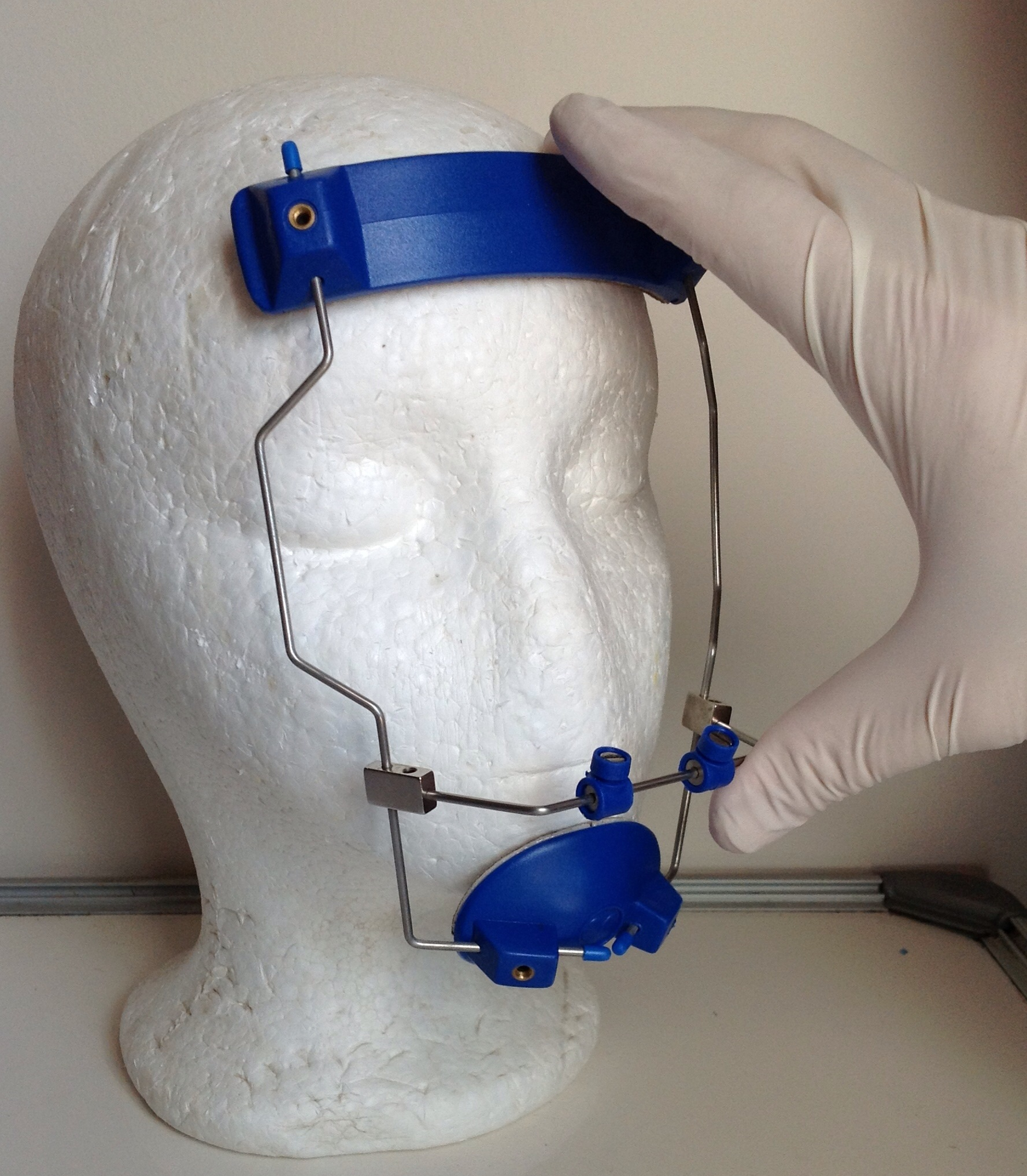
Example of a protraction facemask being test fitted - an orthopedic / orthodontic facemask.

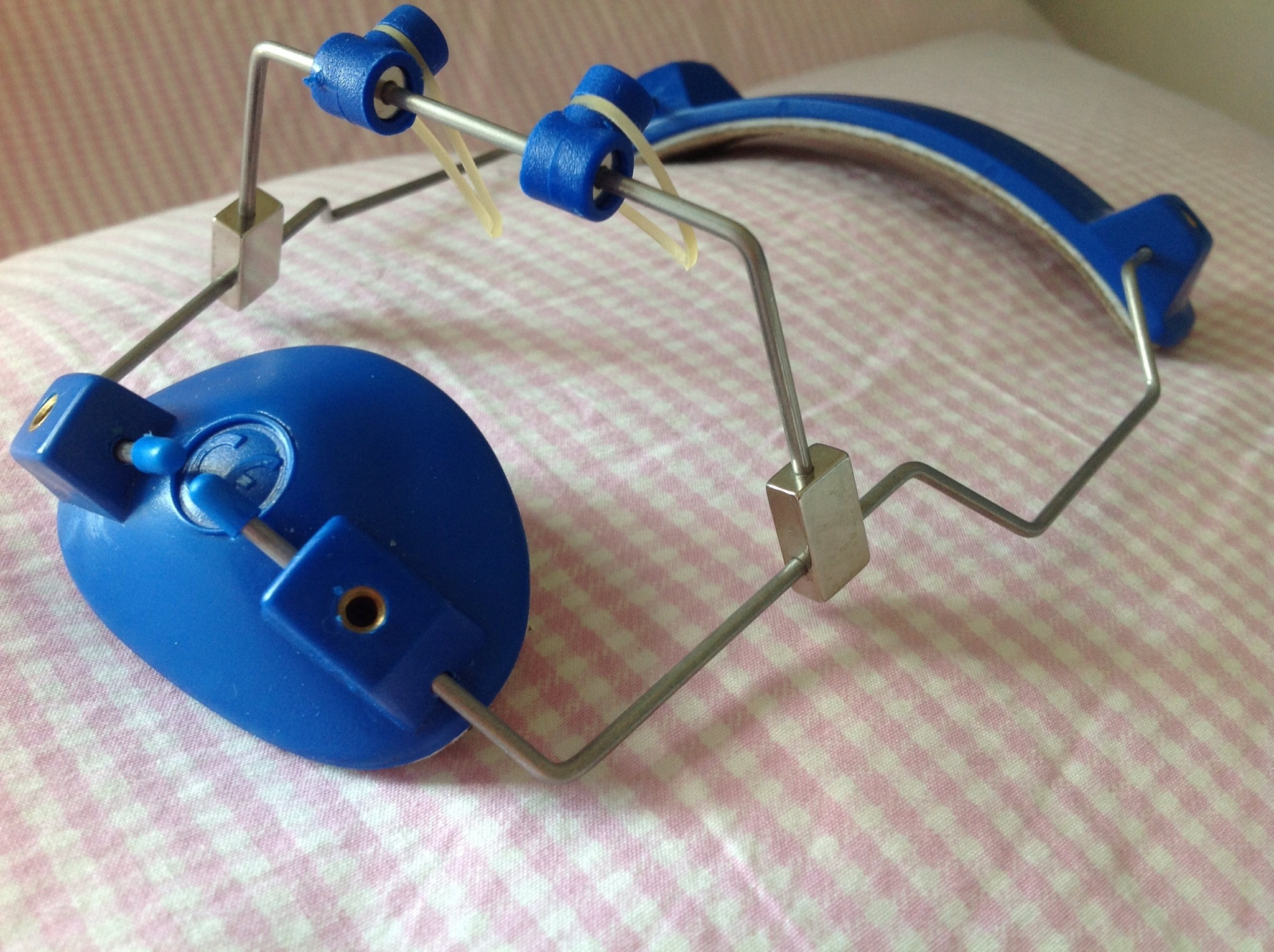
Facemask headgear held onto the patient’s face using the direct force of the connecting elastic bands into the patients mouth, typically worn 14 to 16 hours a day depending on treatment plan.

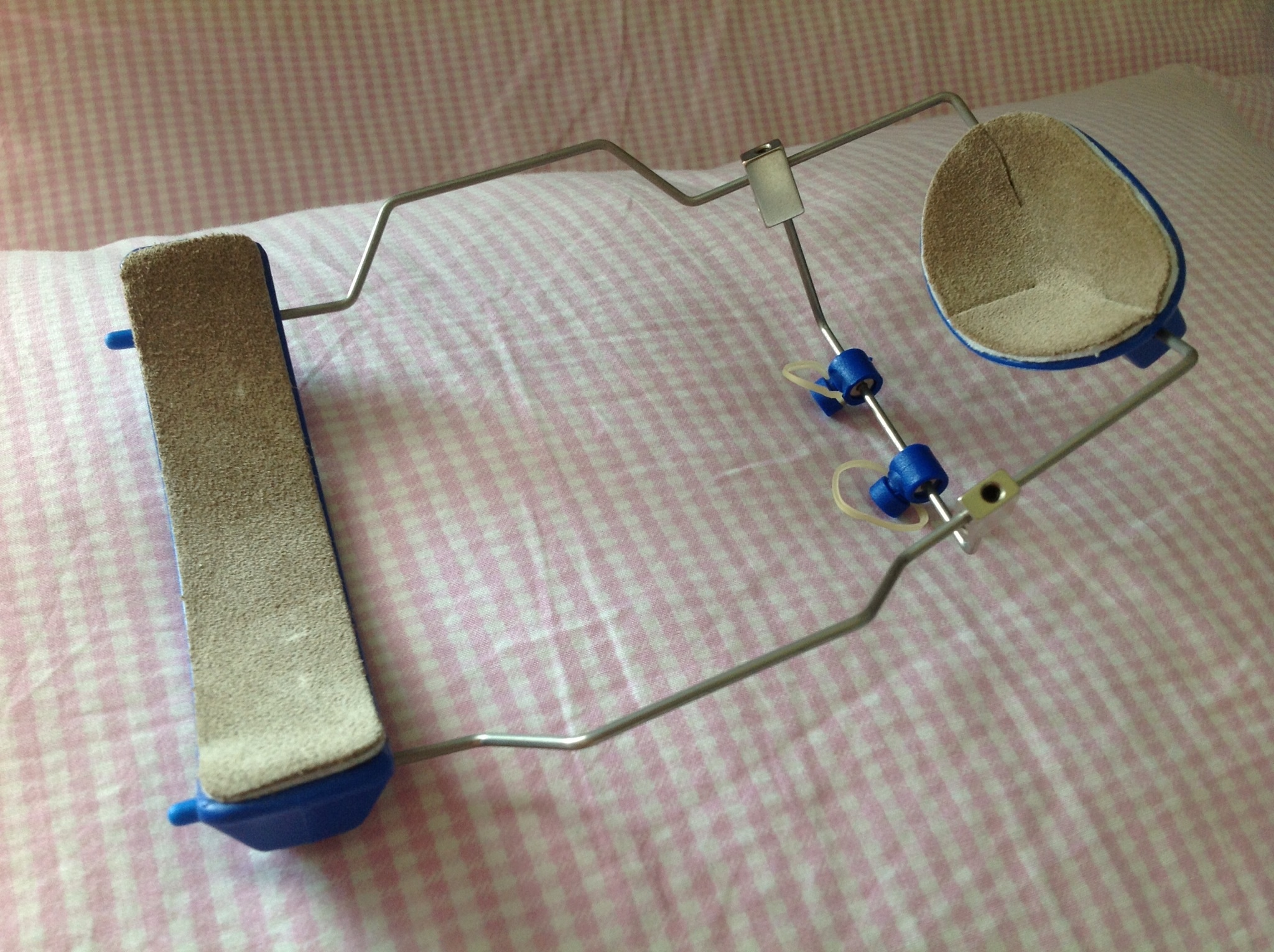
The reverse side of the facemask headgear showing the face frame, pads for forehead and chin with moleskin padding for the patient's comfort.
