= Prognathism =

Protrusion of the upper or lower human jaw

- Other names: Habsburg jaw (in the case of mandibular prognathism)
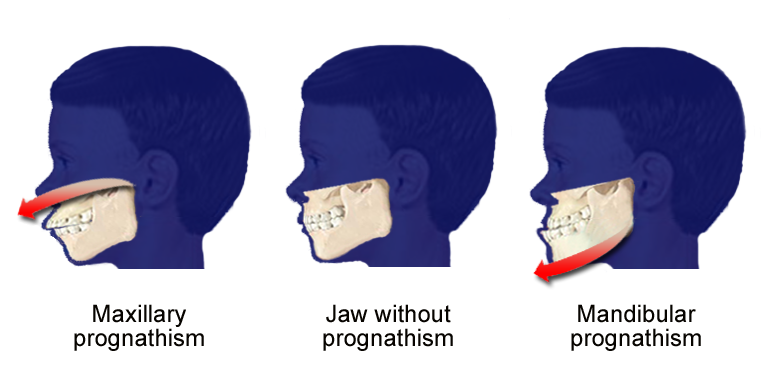
- Illustration of different types
- Specialty: Orthodontics
- Types: Alveolar; Maxillary; Mandibular or progenism
- Causes: Multifactorial
- Treatment: Orthodontics; oral and maxillofacial surgery
- Frequency: Children: 0.5 to 2.0%; Adult: 2.0 to 4.0%

Prognathism is a positional relationship of the mandible or maxilla to the skeletal base where either of the jaws protrudes beyond a predetermined imaginary line in the coronal plane of the skull.

In the case of mandibular prognathism (never maxillary prognathism), this is often also referred to as Habsburg chin, Habsburg's chin, Habsburg jaw or Habsburg's jaw especially when referenced with the context of its prevalence amongst historical members of the House of Habsburg.

Mandibular prognathism is typically pathological, whereas maxillary prognathism is often the result of normal human population variation.

In general dentistry, oral and maxillofacial surgery, and orthodontics, this is assessed clinically or radiographically (cephalometrics). The word prognathism derives from the Greek πρό (pro, meaning 'forward') and γνάθος (gnáthos, 'jaw'). One or more types of prognathism can result in the common condition of malocclusion, in which an individual's top teeth and lower teeth do not align properly.

== Presentation ==
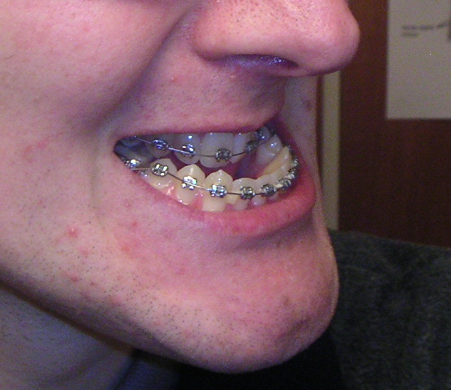
Mandibular prognathism, where teeth have almost reached their final, straight position by dental braces, making the prognathism more obvious

In humans, non-pathological maxillary and alveolar prognathism can occur due to normal variation among phenotypes.

However, mandibular prognathism is usually anomalous, and it may be a malformation, the result of injury, a disease state, or a hereditary condition.

Prognathism is considered a disorder only if it affects chewing, speech or social function as a byproduct of severely affected aesthetics of the face.

Clinical determinants include soft tissue analysis where the clinician assesses nasolabial angle, the relationship of the soft tissue portion of the chin to the nose, and the relationship between the upper and lower lips; also used is dental arch relationship assessment such as Angle's classification.

Cephalometric analysis is the most accurate way of determining all types of prognathism, as it includes assessments of skeletal base, occlusal plane angulation, facial height, soft tissue assessment and anterior dental angulation. Various calculations and assessments of the information in a cephalometric radiograph allow the clinician to objectively determine dental and skeletal relationships and determine a treatment plan.

Prognathism should not be confused with micrognathism, although combinations of both are found.

Alveolar prognathism is a protrusion of that portion of the maxilla where the teeth are located, in the dental lining of the upper jaw.

Maxillary prognathism affects the middle third of the face, causing the maxilla to jut out, thereby increasing the facial area.

Mandibular prognathism is a protrusion of the mandible, affecting the lower third of the face.

Prognathism can also be used to describe ways that the maxillary and mandibular dental arches relate to one another, including malocclusion (where the upper and lower teeth do not align). When there is maxillary or alveolar prognathism which causes an alignment of the maxillary incisors significantly anterior to the lower teeth, the condition is called an overjet. When the reverse is the case, and the lower jaw extends forward beyond the upper, the condition is referred to as underbite (reverse overjet).

== Classification ==
=== Alveolar prognathism ===
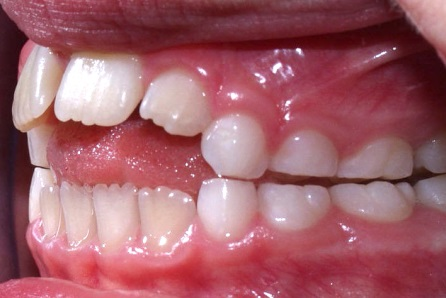
Alveolar prognathism, caused by thumb sucking and tongue thrusting in a seven-year-old girl

Not all alveolar prognathism is anomalous, and significant differences can be observed among different ethnicities.

Harmful habits such as thumb sucking or tongue thrusting can result in or exaggerate an alveolar prognathism, causing teeth to misalign. Functional appliances can be used in growing children to help modify bad habits and neuro-muscular function, with the aim of correcting this condition.

Alveolar prognathism can also easily be corrected with fixed orthodontic therapy. However, relapse is quite common, unless the cause is removed or a long-term retention is used.

=== Maxillary prognathism ===
In disease states, maxillary prognathism is associated with Cornelia de Lange syndrome; however, so-called false maxillary prognathism, or more accurately, retrognathism, where there is a lack of growth of the mandible, is by far a more common condition.

Prognathism, if not extremely severe, can be treated in growing patients with orthodontic functional or orthopaedic appliances. In adult patients this condition can be corrected by means of a combined surgical/orthodontic treatment, where most of the time a mandibular advancement is performed. The same can be said for mandibular prognathism.

On average, Neanderthals were far more prognathic than modern humans regarding the maxilla. This maxillary prognathism, along with their wide noses, suggests that their faces were not adapted to cold climate.

=== Mandibular prognathism (progenism) ===
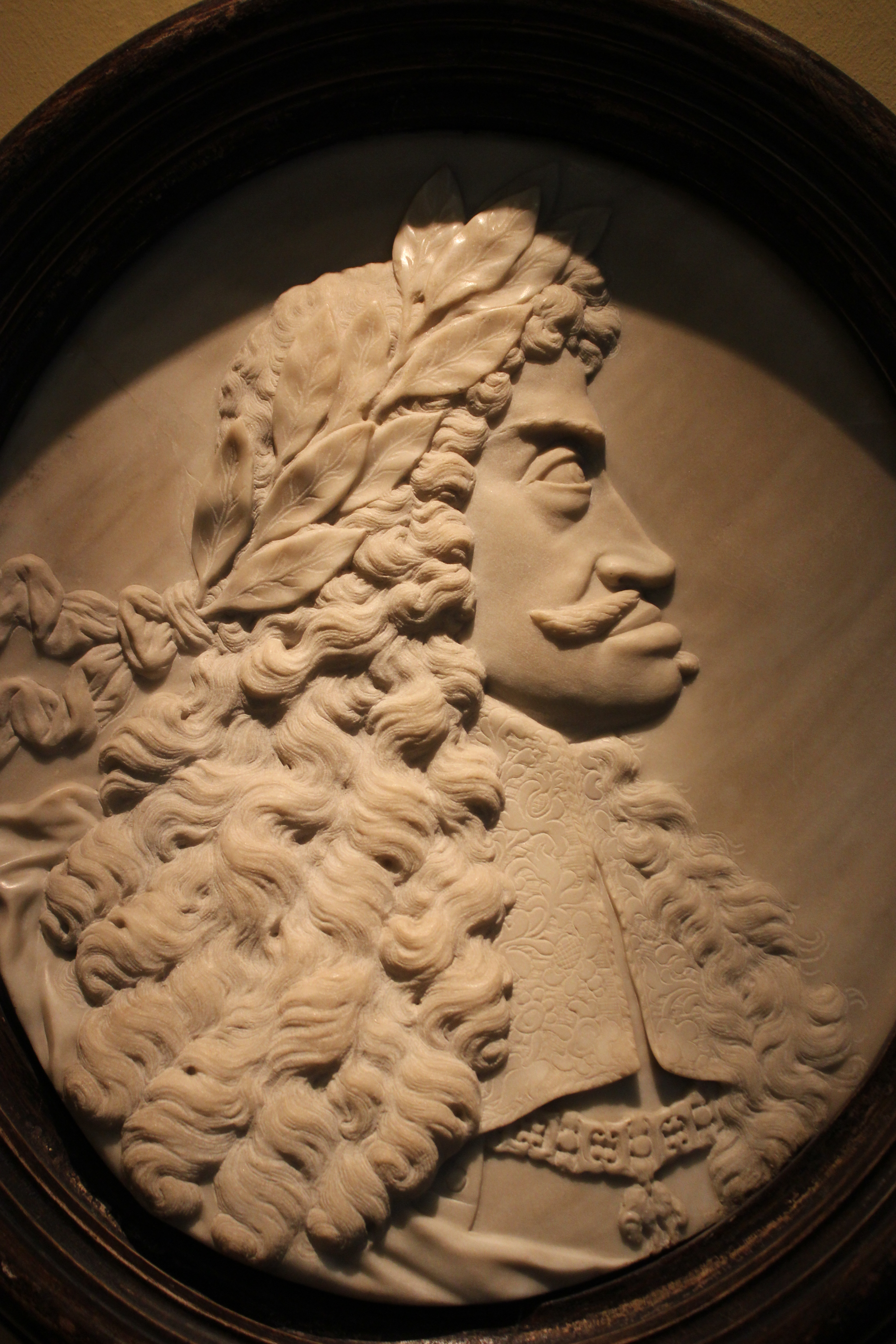
Portrait of Leopold I, showing progenism

Mandibular prognathism is a potentially disfiguring genetic disorder where the lower jaw outgrows the upper, resulting in an extended chin and a crossbite. In both humans and animals, it can be the result of inbreeding.

Unlike alveolar or maxillary prognathism, which are common traits in some populations, mandibular prognathism is typically pathological. However, it is more common among East Asian populations but overall, the condition is polygenic.

In brachycephalic or flat-faced dogs, like Shih Tzus and boxers, it can lead to problems such as underbite.

In humans, it results in a condition sometimes called lantern jaw, reportedly derived from the shape of early lanterns. (Note: The OED uses a slightly different definition: "long thin jaws, giving a hollow appearance to the cheek". Earliest cited reference is from William Langland's 1362 Piers Plowman: "Hongur ...buffeted the Brutiner aboute bothe his chekes; he lokede lyk a lanterne al his lyf after.") Traits such as these were often exaggerated by inbreeding, and can be traced within specific families.

Although the pathology is more common than appreciated, its best known historical example is Habsburg jaw, or Habsburg or Austrian lip, due to its prevalence in members of the House of Habsburg, which can be traced in their portraits. The process of portrait-mapping has provided tools for geneticists and pedigree analysis; most instances are considered polygenic, but a number of researchers believe that this trait is transmitted through an autosomal recessive type of inheritance.

Allegedly introduced into the family by a member of the Piast dynasty, it is clearly visible on family tomb sculptures in St. John's Cathedral, Warsaw. A high propensity for politically motivated intermarriage among Habsburgs meant the dynasty was virtually unparalleled in the degree of its inbreeding. Charles II of Spain, who lived 1661 to 1700, is said to have had the most pronounced case of the Habsburg jaw on record, due to the high number of consanguineous marriages in the dynasty preceding his birth.

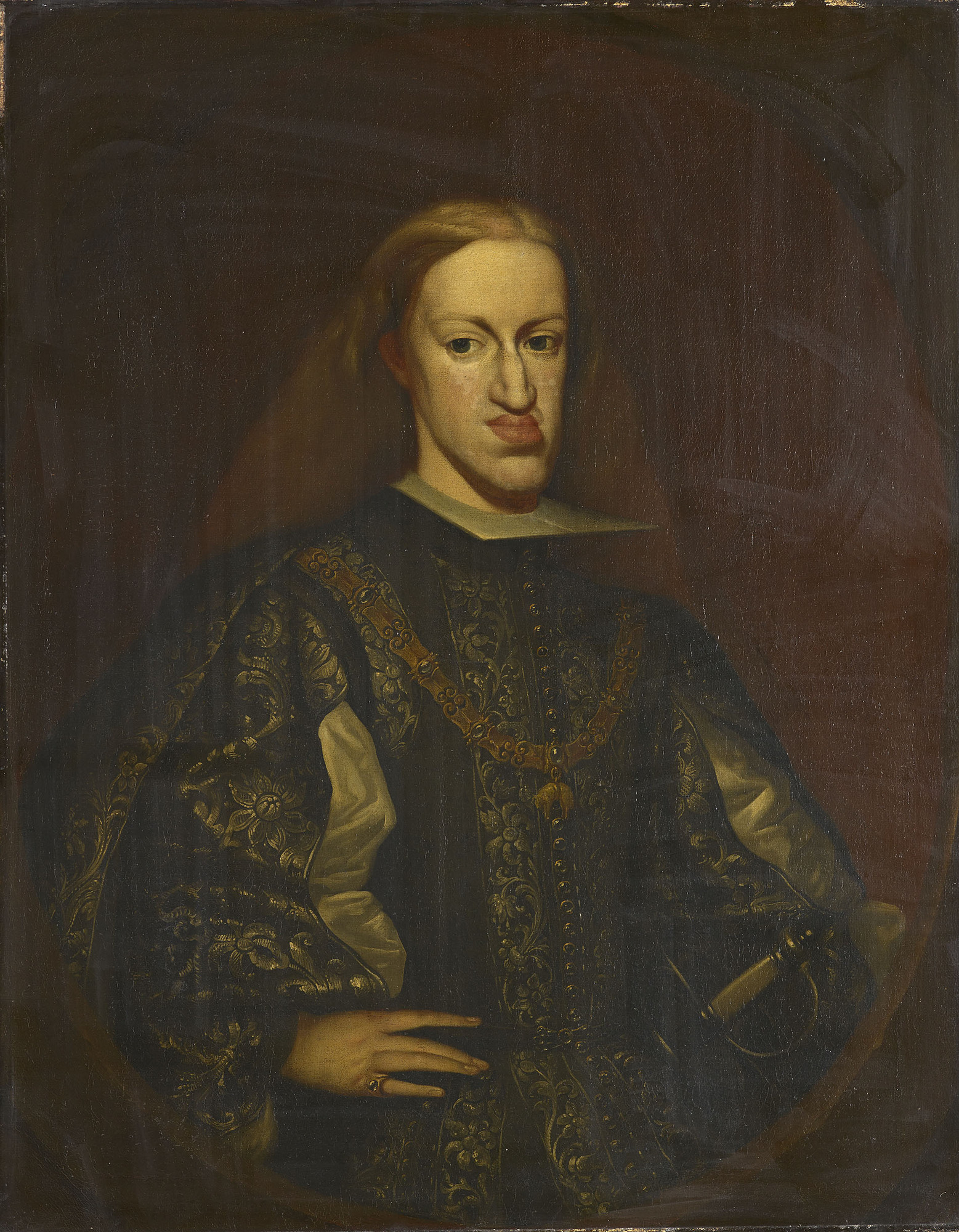
Charles II of Spain showing Habsburg jaw, a severe type of mandibular prognathism

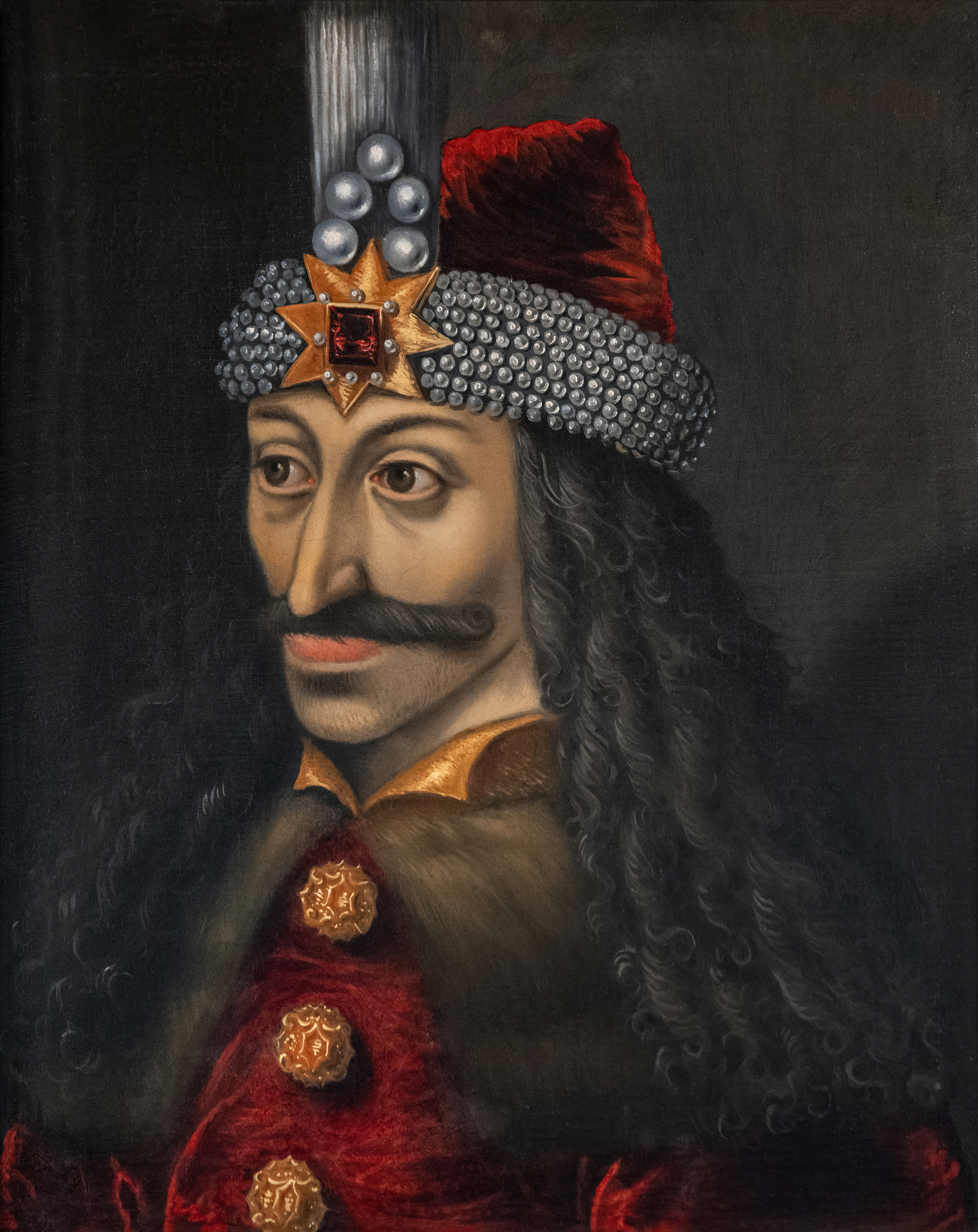
Vlad III of Wallachia

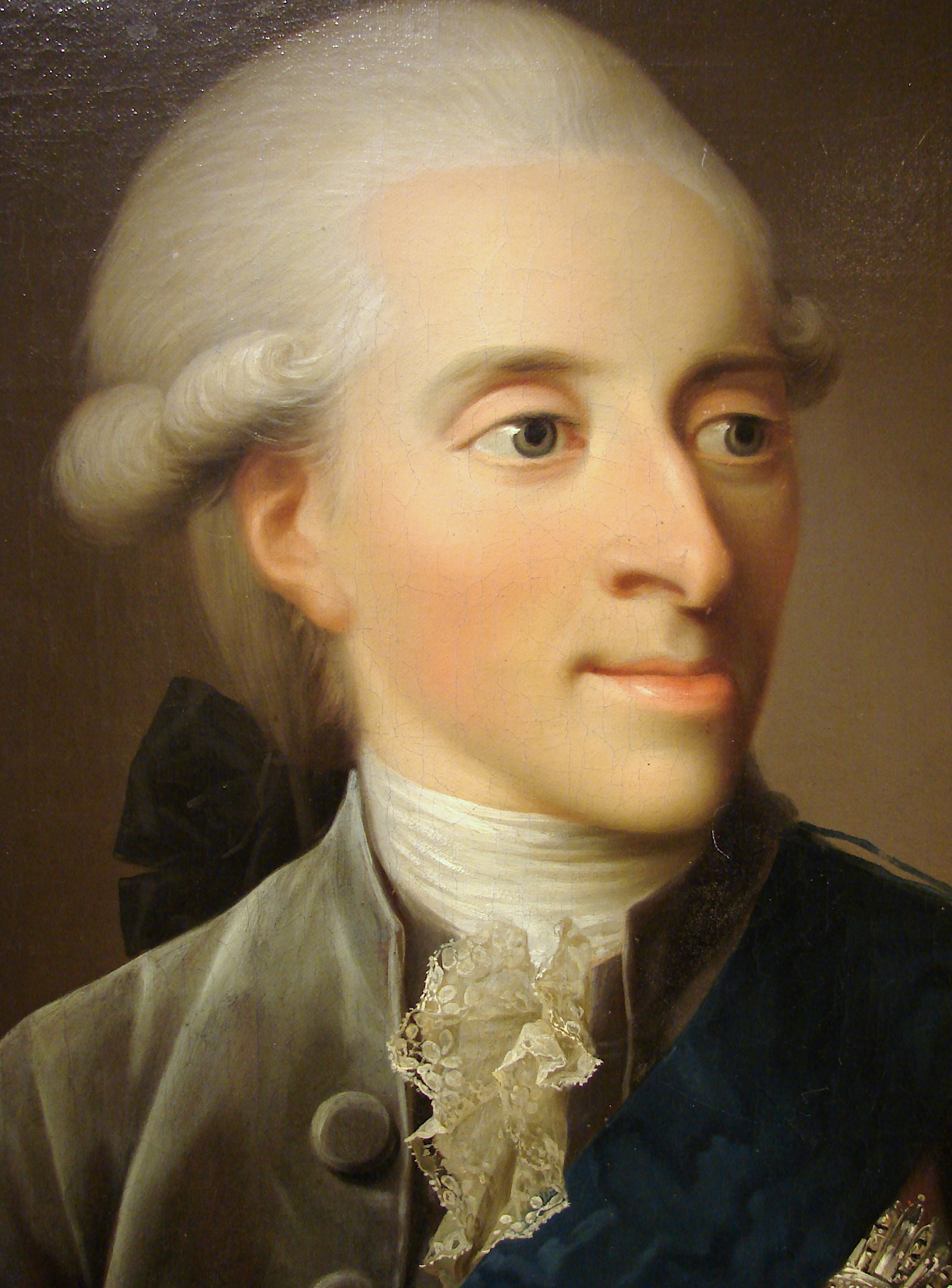
Frederick, regent of Denmark-Norway

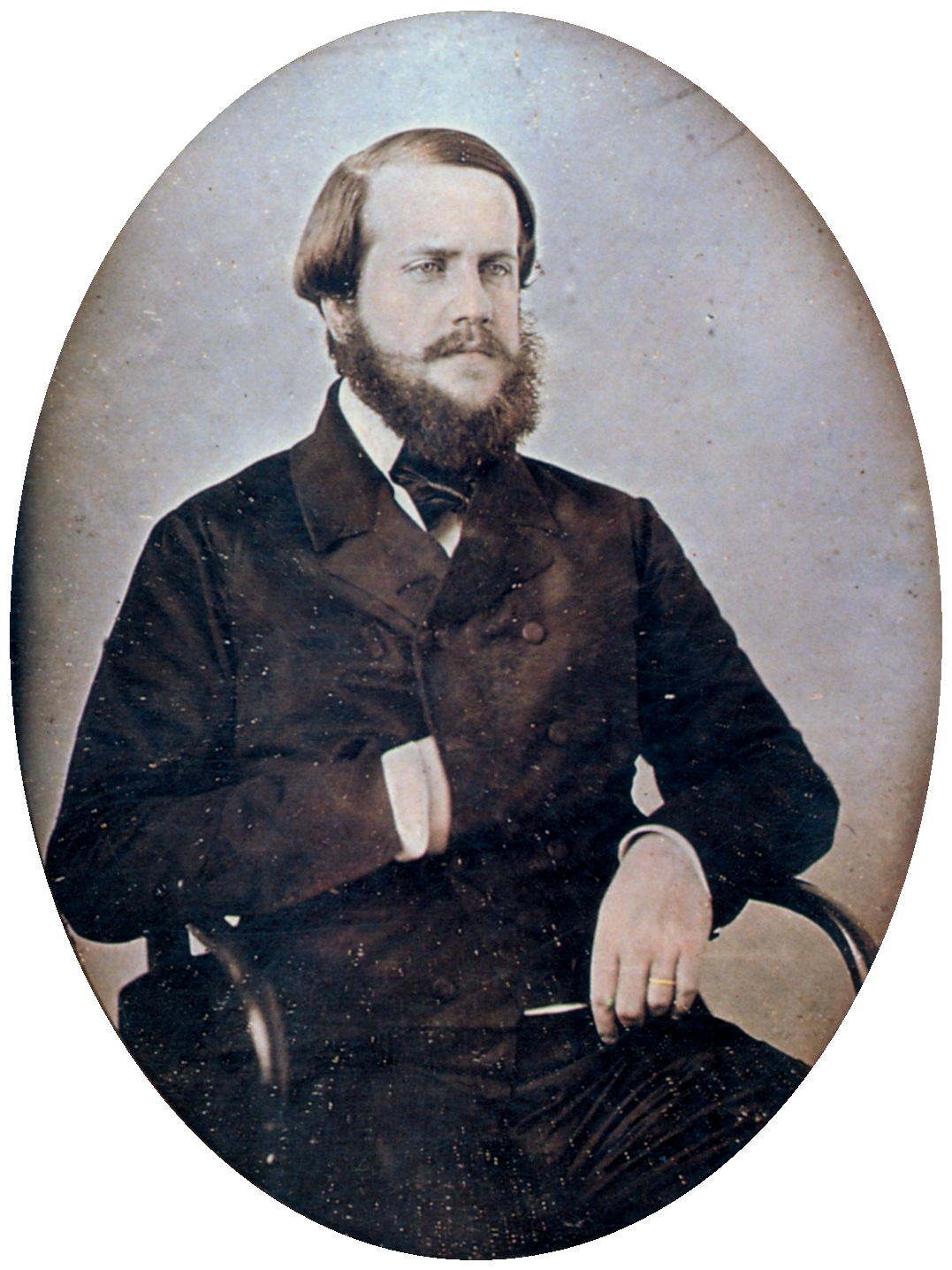
Pedro II of Brazil. His mother was Archduchess Maria Leopoldina of Austria, a member of the House of Habsburg-Lorraine by birth.

== Treatment of mandibular prognathism ==
Prior to the development of modern dentistry, there was no treatment for this condition; those who had it simply endured it. Today, the most common treatment for mandibular prognathism is a combination of orthodontics and orthognathic surgery. The orthodontics can involve braces, removal of teeth, or a mouthguard.

== In insects ==
In entomology, prognathous means that the mouthparts face forwards, being at the front of the head, rather than facing downwards as in some insects.

== See also ==
- Dental pathology

== General and cited sources ==
- Beuchat, Carol (12 March 2015). "Why all the fuss about inbreeding?". Institute of Canine Biology.
- Mitchell, Sylvia Z (May 2013). Mariana of Austria and Imperial Spain: Court, Dynastic, and International Politics in Seventeenth-Century Europe (Ph.D.). Coral Gables, Florida: University of Miami.
- Vilas, Román; Ceballos, Francisco C.; Al-Soufi, Laila; González-García, Raúl; Moreno, Carlos; Moreno, Manuel; Villanueva, Laura; Ruiz, Luis; Mateos, Jesús; González, David; Ruiz, Jennifer; Cinza, Aitor; Monje, Florencio; Álvarez, Gonzalo (17 November 2019). "Is the 'Habsburg jaw' related to inbreeding?". Annals of Human Biology. 46 (7–8): 553–561. doi:10.1080/03014460.2019.1687752. PMID 31786955. S2CID 208536371.
- Vioarsdóttir, US; O'Higgins, O; Stringer, C (2002). "A geometric morphometric study of regional differences in the ontogeny of the modern human facial skeleton". J. Anat. 201 (3): 211–229. doi:10.1046/j.1469-7580.2002.00092.x. PMC 1570912. PMID 12363273.
- Wolff, G; Wienker, T F; Sander, H (1 February 1993). "On the genetics of mandibular prognathism: analysis of large European noble families". Journal of Medical Genetics. 30 (2): 112–116. doi:10.1136/jmg.30.2.112. PMC 1016265. PMID 8445614.
