= Retainer (orthodontics) =

Device to hold teeth in position

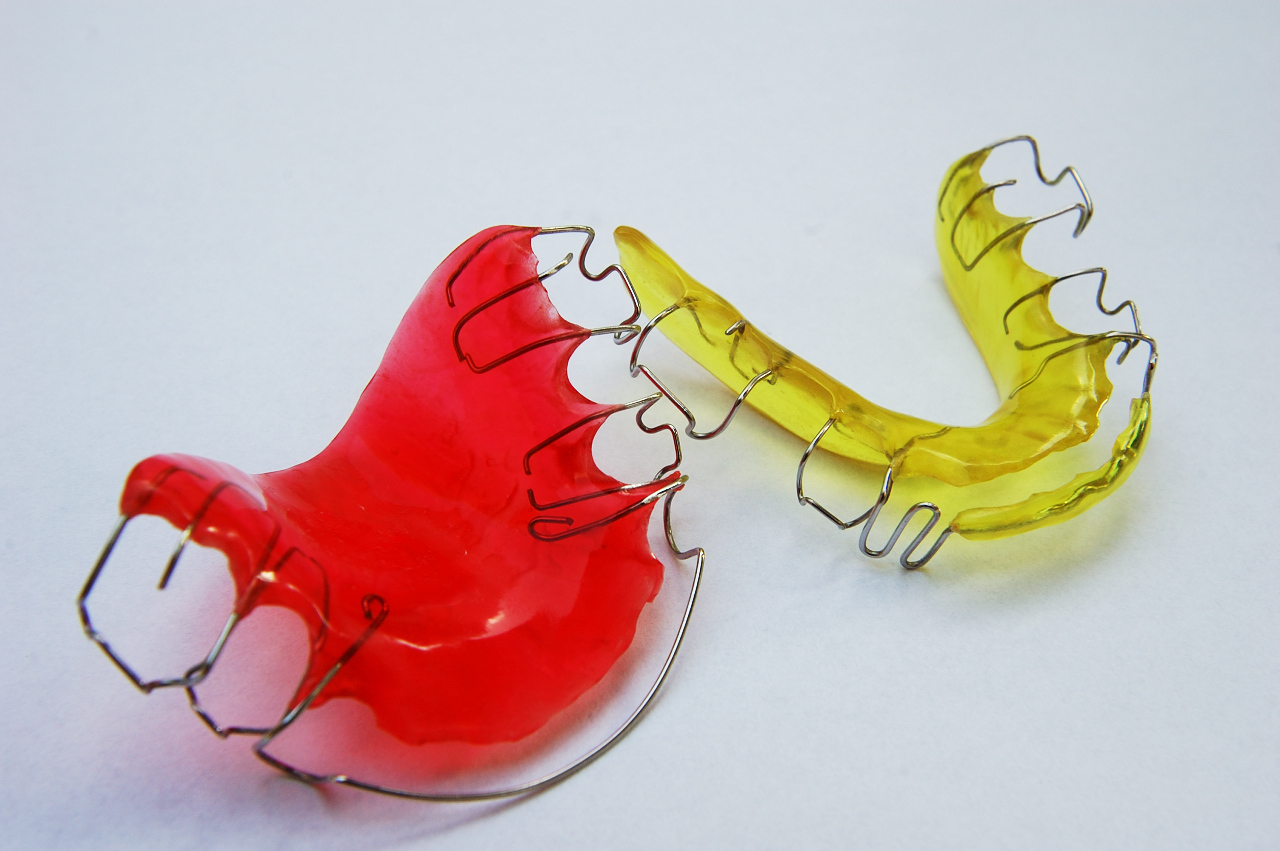
Top (left) and bottom (right) retainers

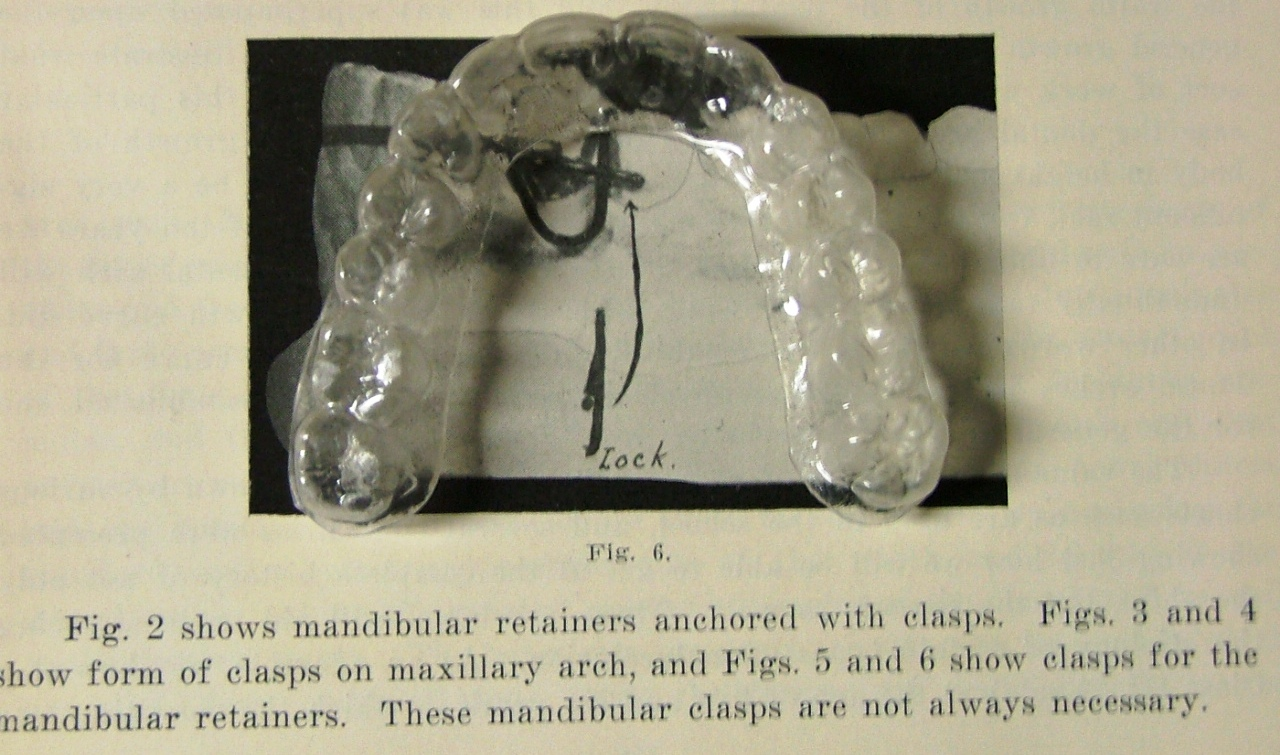
Vacuum form retainer in the foreground (used on upper); illustration of an early Hawley retainer in the background

Orthodontic retainers are custom-made devices, usually made of wires or clear plastic, that hold teeth in position after surgery or any method of realigning teeth. Once a phase of orthodontic treatment has been completed to straighten teeth, there remains a lifelong risk of relapse (a tendency for teeth to return to their original position) due to a number of factors: recoil of periodontal fibres, pressure from surrounding soft tissues, the occlusion and patient's continued growth and development. By using retainers to hold the teeth in their new position for a length of time, the surrounding periodontal fibres adapt to changes in the bone which can help minimize any changes to the final tooth position after the completion of orthodontic treatment. Retainers may also be used to treat overjets.

== Removable retainers ==
Removable retainers include Hawley, Vacuum-formed, Begg and Barrer. They provide orthodontic retention when worn and they can be taken in and out of the mouth. They can be worn part-time or full-time if required or as advised by the orthodontist. In comparison to fixed retainers, removable retainers are easier to clean.

=== Hawley retainers ===
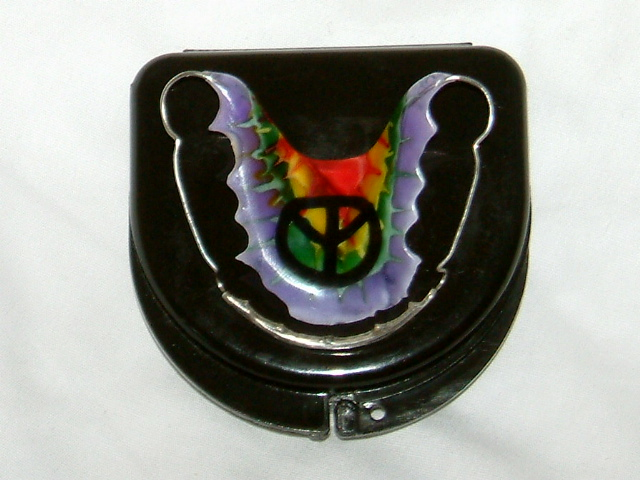
The underneath surface of an upper Wrap Around Hawley retainer resting on top of a retainer case

The best-known removable retainers are the Hawley retainers, which consist of a metal wires that typically surround the six anterior teeth and keep them in place. Hawley retainers are one of the oldest types of removable retainers. Named for its inventor, Dr. Charles A. Hawley, the labial wire, or Hawley bow, incorporates 2 omega loops for adjustment. It is anchored in an acrylic baseplate that sits in the palate (roof of the mouth). They are made from metal wire running along the outside of the teeth. There are many adaptations possible with Hawley retainers. The advantage of this type of retainer is that the metal wires can be adjusted to finish treatment and continue minor movement of the anterior teeth as needed. It also benefits from being robust and rigid, easy to construct and allows prosthetic tooth/teeth to be added onto with metal stops placed mesial and distal to the prosthetic teeth to prevent any relapse. To help fix rotations; acrylic facing can be added to the labial bow and a bite plane added to maintain the result of deep overbite correction. Also, to control the position of the canine, reverse U-loop can be employed. Additionally, to avoid occlusal interferences, the labial bow can be soldered to the cribs.

The main disadvantages of this type of retainer is its inferior aesthetics, interference with speech, risk of fracture and inferior retention of lower incisors in comparison to vacuum-formed retainers.

Recently, a more aesthetic version of the Hawley retainer has been developed. For this alternative, the front metal wire is replaced with a clear wire called the ASTICS. This retainer is intended to be adjustable similarly to the traditional Hawley retainer, which is not practical with vacuum-formed retainers.

Research shows that Hawley retainers are not effective for preventing incisor irregularity relapse. Hawley retainers also affect speech, especially the d, s, t, and i sounds, however as they are often only worn at night time, this concern may not be so prevalent. Research shows that participants that wear Hawley retainers report being more embarrassed about the appliance than wearing vacuum formed retainers and they found Hawley retainers more difficult to wear. However, if the patient has concerns with regards to the visible metal wire, a clear polyethylene bow can be used to enhance aesthetics.

The process of making an acrylic retainer was featured on the How It's Made TV show on the Science Channel on Season 23, Episode 16.

=== Vacuum-formed retainers ===
Another common type of removable retainer is the vacuum formed retainer (VFR). This is a polypropylene or polyvinylchloride (PVC) material. VFRs are made using a thermoforming process, using vacuum- or pressure-thermoforming. This clear or transparent retainer normally fits over the entire arch of teeth, however some designs fit only from canine to canine (clip-on retainer). The retainer is clear and so virtually invisible when worn. Hence, it can offer an aesthetic advantage relative to other retainers. VFRs, if worn 24 hours per day, do not allow the upper and lower teeth to touch, as the retainers cover the occlusal (biting) surfaces of the teeth. Some orthodontists feel that it is important for the top and bottom chewing surfaces to meet to allow for "favourable settling" to occur, thus the need for wearing the retainer only intermittently. VFRs are most commonly worn overnight and removed while eating. If worn while eating, they can behave as a reservoir enclosing the teeth with cariogenic substances and lead to decalcification of teeth over time (formation of cavities). The same can result if the retainer is inserted straight after a meal or drink. VFRs tend to be favoured as an orthodontic retainer as they are more aesthetic, interfere less with speech and are more economical than other removable retainers. However, for patients with disorders such as bruxism, VFRs can be prone to rapid breakage and deterioration due to grinding of the VFR against the opposing teeth. There is, however, an increased ease of fabrication over other retainers if they do break. Another advantage of VFRs is that there is evidence to suggest superior retention of lower incisors compared to other removable retainer types, but the best retention was achieved with fixed retainers.

=== Begg retainers ===
The Begg retainers have the labial bow extending around the distal aspect of the terminal molar. They allow occlusal settling, as no wire work crosses the occlusion. Begg retainers are robust enough to be worn during eating, however they are more retentive than Hawley retainers and the labial bow is less prone to distortion.

=== Barrer retainers ===
The Barrer retainers (aka Spring retainers) carry acrylic bows both labially and lingually. The original appliance extended only to the canines, however due to the risk of swallowing or aspiration, a modification which includes cribs on the first molars has been described. These retainers can be used to realign minor lower incisor relapse.

=== SMART retainers ===
Dental practitioners and orthodontists are sometimes resistant to providing younger patients with removable retainers due to the potential issues of the patient not wearing their retainer consistently after completing their orthodontic treatment. However, the recent innovation of SMART Retainers and related mobile applications that track, remind, and reward the patients for their continued use of their retainer may lead to a significant decrease in the number of adolescents that obtain additional orthodontic treatment in the future due to them not complying with their retainer usage. The mobile application has a unique feature that allows for parental notifications. If the child does not open their Smart Retainer Case, the parent can receive mobile notifications to help reduce retainer non-compliance.

== Fixed retainers ==
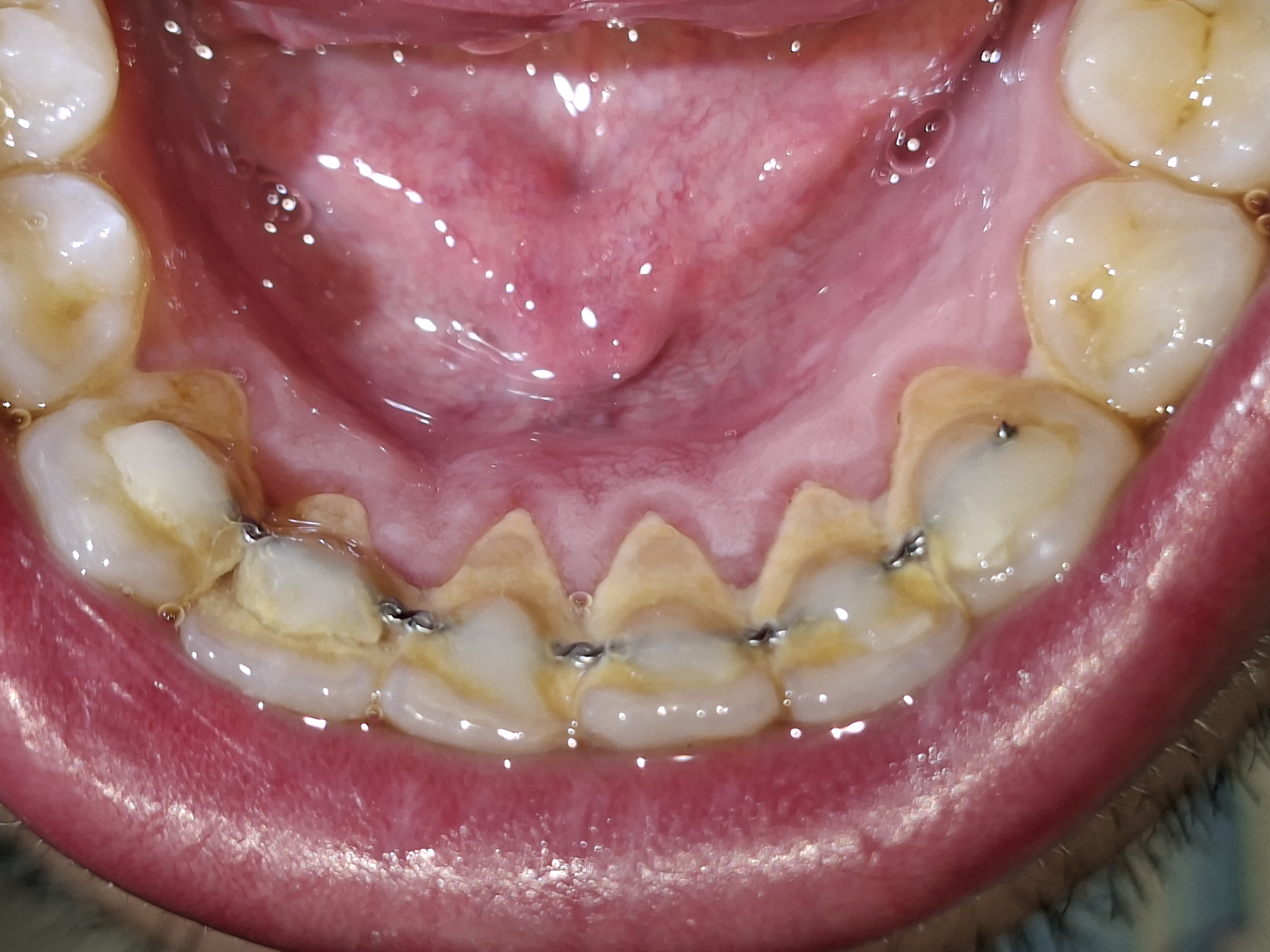
Fixed retainer behind the lower incisors and canines

Fixed retainers are often used to provide orthodontic retention and avoid relapse. They commonly consist of a wire bonded with acid etch and composite to the lingual/palatal surface of the anterior teeth. In fixed retainers, composite is usually placed to bond and to cover the wire, whilst ensuring no interference in the interdental space. Fixed retainers are used in situations where instability is more likely, such as severe rotations, periodontal disease and median diastemas. Occasionally the patient will require a removable retainer as well. Fixed bonded retainers can be designed with a smooth wire or flexible spiral wire which is also known as multi-strand wire. The most commonly used are multi-strand wire bonded to all six anterior teeth or a round stainless steel wire bonded to the canines only. Although fixed retainers depend less on the patient's cooperation for regular wearing, they are more difficult to clean and therefore need more attention from the patient to prevent plaque accumulation and subsequent gingival inflammation.

== Maintenance ==
Relapse can occur if retainers are not worn regularly post-treatment. The orthodontist may advise wearing the retainer for a set period of time or indefinitely after orthodontic treatment. Recent innovations of a Smart Retainer Case that utilizes: IoT, motion sensors, and a mobile application to track, remind, and reward patients, might be the most effective way of keeping post-orthodontic patients engaged with their final retention and continued wear of their removable retainer. If not cleaned properly, retainers can act as a food reservoir and lead to caries and gingival inflammation. Cleaning options for removable retainers include retainer/denture tablets, the use of a toothbrush and fragrance-free soap or non-abrasive toothpaste. If the water used to clean the retainer is too hot, it may cause shrinkage.

If the retainer is removable, it should be cleaned before inserting. If the retainer is fixed and cannot be removed, it should be cleaned during the nighttime home care routine. To clean a retainer use a wet toothbrush and gently scrub all surfaces of the retainer to remove any plaque and bacteria. A non-abrasive toothpaste should be used when cleaning a retainer. Alternatively, a mild soap or a brush dipped in mouthwash can also be used to clean it. When not in use keep the retainer in a dry container. Avoid leaving it in high temperatures or in the sun. Do not soak a retainer in liquids overnight. This will ensure the material will stay intact.

== See also ==
- SMART Retainer
