= SMART Retainer =

Sensor used to monitor how long patient wears a retainer

The SMART Retainer is a small micro sensor which is imbedded in a traditional orthodontic retainer. The sensor monitors how often the retainer is being worn, and the information is loaded onto the orthodontist's computer via a reader.

== Description ==
The micro sensor was created to help parents and orthodontists monitor retainer use after braces are removed. The smart retainer chip is about the size of a shirt button and provides detailed information about the chip's environmental surroundings. In the United States a smart retainer sensor is exclusively provided by orthodontists who have signed up to be providers, and should retail for around $100.

The SMART Retainer was featured on the May 15 episode of The Today Show.

Here is an abstract of an article in the American Journal of Orthodontics and Dentofacial Orthopedics:

Retention is routinely prescribed after orthodontic treatment to prevent relapse. Orthodontists often notice a discrepancy between what a patient reports about retainer wear and what a clinical examination shows. In these cases, is the patient misreporting wear, or is the retainer at fault? Scientific Compliance (Atlanta, Ga) has invented, patented, and produced the Smart Retainer environmental microsensor that can be easily incorporated into many types of removable orthodontic appliances to monitor compliance. The technology behind the Smart Retainer environmental microsensor is possible because of recent reductions in electronic component sizes and power requirements. A proprietary USB-powered Smart Reader uses wireless technology to download information about actual usage from the Smart Retainer. The information is decrypted and analyzed, and can be shown to the patient in easy-to-understand charts. The orthodontist can use this information to discuss actual retainer usage vs prescribed retainer usage with the patient or parent and make data-driven recommendations about future retention.
