= Hayes Nance =

American orthodontist (1893–1964)

- Born: August 14, 1893; Jackson, Tennessee.
- Died: April 3, 1964 (aged 70); Pasadena, California
- Education: Northwestern University Dental School
- Known for: Father of Serial Extraction in United States, Developing Nance Appliance, Developing the term Leeway Space
- Medical career
- Profession: Dentist
- Sub-specialties: orthodontics

Hayes Nance (August 14, 1893 – April 3, 1964) was an American orthodontist known for his contributions to topics related to mixed dentition. Nance is known for developing serial extraction in United States, as well as pioneering the development of the Nance Appliance.

== Life ==
Nance was born in 1893 in Jackson, Tennessee, the youngest of five children. After his mother died in 1908, Nance attended the Webb School of Knoxville, Tennessee. During his childhood, he was involved in an accident while working in a copper mine in Miami, Florida. While working, Hayes suffered a fall which led to several fractures including a spinal injury. He married Julia Manning.

He attended Northwestern University Dental School in 1919 and practiced for a short time in Arizona. He then eventually moved to Denver and opened his own practice.

He retired in 1948. He married Florence Hays in 1956. He died in 1964 at his home in Pasadena, California due to a heart attack. Florence died in 1955 also due to a heart attack.

== Orthodontics ==
Nance wrote a paper in 1947 titled Limitations of Orthodontic Treatment that was the culmination of his 17 years of orthodontia. Nance described the concept of "leeway space". This space is usually found in human teeth after the permanent premolars in each arch have erupted. It is about 3.5mm in mandibles and 2mm in the maxillary arch. The adult premolar teeth are smaller than their predecessors, primary first and second molars. Therefore, the space that is naturally created, is usually taken up by the movement of the permanent first molar moving mesially. Nance showed that the combined width of mandibular deciduous canines, first molar and second molar is on average 1.7mm greater than that of the permanent successors on one side. The maxillary arch occupies about 1mm on each quadrant. Nance developed the Nance Appliance, which is used to prevent upper first molars from moving forward after the maxillary first primary molar has been prematurely lost.

== Recognition ==
- Diplomate of American Board of Orthodontics
- Charles H. Tweed Foundation - President, Honorary Member
- Southern California Component of Edward H. Angle Society of Orthodontia - President, Honorary Member
- Albert H. Ketcham Memorial Award (1963)
