= Retrognathism =

Abnormal backwards positioning of the jaw relative to the rest of the face

- Other names: Retrognathism
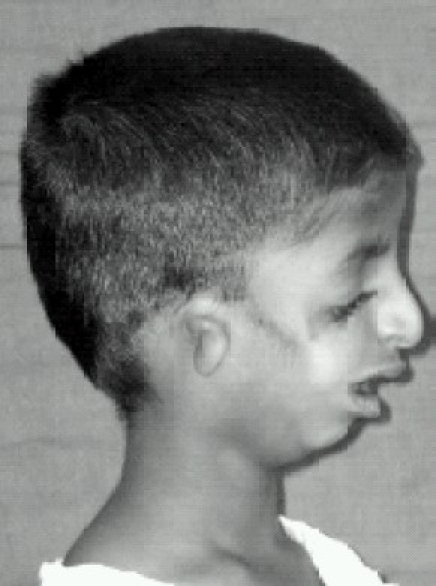
- A child with Treacher Collins syndrome showing microtia and retrognathism awaiting corrective surgery
- Specialty: Medical genetics, dentistry

Retrognathia is a type of malocclusion which refers to an abnormal posterior positioning of the maxilla or mandible, particularly the mandible, relative to the facial skeleton and soft tissues.

A retrognathic mandible is commonly referred to as an overbite, though this terminology is not used medically.

== See also ==
- Micrognathism
- Prognathism
