= Malocclusion =

Misalignment between upper and lower teeth as the jaws close

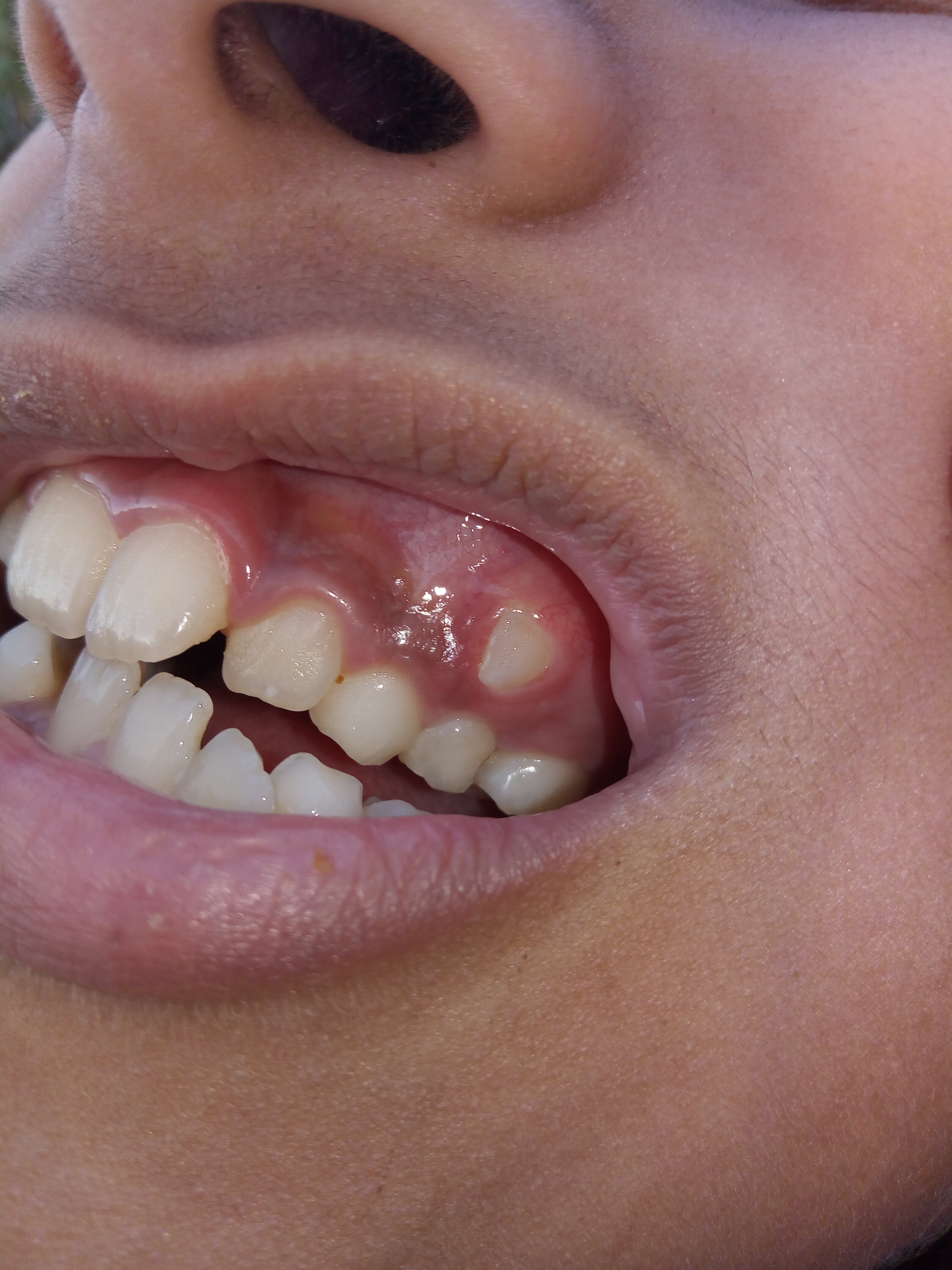
- Malocclusion in 10-year-old girl
- Specialty: Dentistry

In orthodontics, a malocclusion is a misalignment or incorrect relation between the teeth of the upper and lower dental arches when they approach each other as the jaws close. The English-language term dates from 1864; Edward Angle (1855 – 1930), the "father of modern orthodontics," popularised it. The word derives from mal- 'incorrect' and occlusion 'the manner in which opposing teeth meet'.

The malocclusion classification is based on the relationship of the mesiobuccal cusp of the maxillary first molar and the buccal groove of the mandibular first molar. If this molar relationship exists, then the teeth can align into normal occlusion. According to Angle, malocclusion is any deviation of the occlusion from the ideal. However, assessment for malocclusion should also take into account aesthetics and the impact on functionality. If these aspects are acceptable to the patient despite meeting the formal definition of malocclusion, then treatment may not be necessary. It is estimated that nearly 30% of the population has malocclusions that are categorised as severe and definitely benefit from orthodontic treatment.

== Causes ==
The aetiology of malocclusion is somewhat contentious; however, simply put, it is multifactorial, with influences being both genetic and environmental. Malocclusion is already present in one of the Skhul and Qafzeh hominin fossils and other prehistoric human skulls. There are three generally accepted causative factors of malocclusion:

- Skeletal factors – the size, shape, and relative positions of the upper and lower jaws. Variations can be caused by environmental or behavioral factors such as a diet of soft, cooked food (as opposed to hard foods such as raw fruits and vegetables) in childhood, causing smaller jaws, muscles of mastication, nocturnal mouth breathing, and cleft lip and cleft palate.
- Muscle factors – the form and function of the muscles that surround the teeth. This can be affected by habits such as finger sucking, onychophagia (nail biting), dermatophagia (skin biting), pacifier use, and tongue thrusting.
- Dental factors – size of the teeth in relation to the jaw, early loss of teeth can result in spacing or mesial migration causing crowding, abnormal eruption path or timings, hyperdontia (extra teeth), or hypodontia (too few teeth).

There is not one single cause of malocclusion, and in the planning of orthodontic treatment, it is often helpful to consider the above factors and the effect they have had on malocclusion. These can also be influenced by oral habits and pressure, resulting in malocclusion.

=== Behavioral and dental factors ===
In the active skeletal growth, mouth breathing, finger or thumb sucking, pacifier sucking, nail biting, skin biting, pen or pencil biting, abnormal posture, deglutition disorders, and other habits greatly influence the development of the face and dental arches. Pacifier sucking habits are also correlated with otitis media. Dental caries, periapical inflammation, and tooth loss in the deciduous teeth can alter the correct permanent teeth eruptions.

=== Primary and secondary dentition ===
Malocclusion can occur in primary and secondary dentition.

In primary dentition, malocclusion is caused by:

- Underdevelopment of the dentoalveolor tissue.
- Overdevelopment of bones around the mouth.
- Cleft lip and palate.
- Overcrowding of teeth.
- Abnormal development and growth of teeth.

In secondary dentition, malocclusion is caused by:

- Periodontal disease.
- Overeruption of teeth.
- Premature and congenital loss of missing teeth.

== Signs and symptoms ==
Malocclusion is a common finding, although it is not usually serious enough to require treatment. Those who have more severe malocclusions, which present as a part of craniofacial anomalies, may require orthodontic and sometimes surgical treatment (orthognathic surgery) to correct the problem.

The ultimate goal of orthodontic treatment is to achieve a stable, functional and aesthetic alignment of teeth which serves to better the patient's dental and total health. The symptoms which arise as a result of malocclusion derive from a deficiency in one or more of these categories.

The symptoms are as follows:

- Tooth decay (caries): misaligned teeth will make it more difficult to maintain oral hygiene. Children with poor oral hygiene and diet will be at an increased risk.
- Periodontal disease: irregular teeth would hinder the ability to clean teeth, meaning poor plaque control. Additionally, if teeth are crowded, some may be more buccally or lingually placed, and there will be reduced bone and periodontal support. Furthermore, in Class III malocclusions, mandibular anterior teeth are pushed labially, which contributes to gingival recession and weakens periodontal support.
- Trauma to anterior teeth: Those with an increased overjet are at an increased risk of trauma. A systematic review found that an overjet of greater than 3mm will double the risk of trauma.
- Masticatory function: people with anterior open bites, large increased & reverse overjet, and hypodontia will find it more difficult to chew food.
- Speech impairment: a lisp is when the incisors cannot make contact; orthodontics can treat this. However, other forms of misaligned teeth will have little impact on speech, and orthodontic treatment has little effect on fixing any problems.
- Tooth impaction: these can cause resorption of adjacent teeth and other pathologies, for example, a dentigerous cyst formation.
- Psychosocial well-being: malocclusions of teeth with poor aesthetics can have a significant effect on self-esteem.

Malocclusions may be coupled with skeletal disharmony of the face, where the relations between the upper and lower jaws are not appropriate. Such skeletal disharmonies often distort the sufferer's facial shape, severely affect the aesthetics of the face, and may be coupled with mastication or speech problems. Most skeletal malocclusions can only be treated by orthognathic surgery.

== Classification ==
Depending on the sagittal relations of teeth and jaws, malocclusions can be divided mainly into three types according to Angle's classification system published, in 1899. However, there are also other conditions, e.g., crowding of teeth, that do not directly fit into this classification.

Many authors have tried to modify or replace Angle's classification. This has resulted in many subtypes and new systems (see section below: Review of Angle's system of classes).

A deep bite (also known as a Type II Malocclusion) is a condition in which the upper teeth overlap the lower teeth, which can result in hard and soft tissue trauma, in addition to an effect on appearance. It has been found to occur in 15–20% of the US population.

An open bite is a condition characterised by a complete lack of overlap and occlusion between the upper and lower incisors. In children, an open bite can be caused by prolonged thumb sucking. Patients often present with impaired speech and mastication.

=== Overbites ===
This is a vertical measurement of the degree of overlap between the maxillary incisors and the mandibular incisors. There are three features that are analysed in the classification of an overbite:

- Degree of overlap: edge to edge, reduced, average, increased.
- Complete or incomplete: whether there is contact between the lower teeth and the opposing teeth/tissue (hard palate or gingivae) or not.
- Whether contact is traumatic or atraumatic.

An average overbite is when the upper anterior teeth cover a third of the lower teeth. Covering less than this is described as 'reduced,' and more than this is an 'increased' overbite. No overlap or contact is considered an 'anterior open bite'.

=== Angle's classification method ===
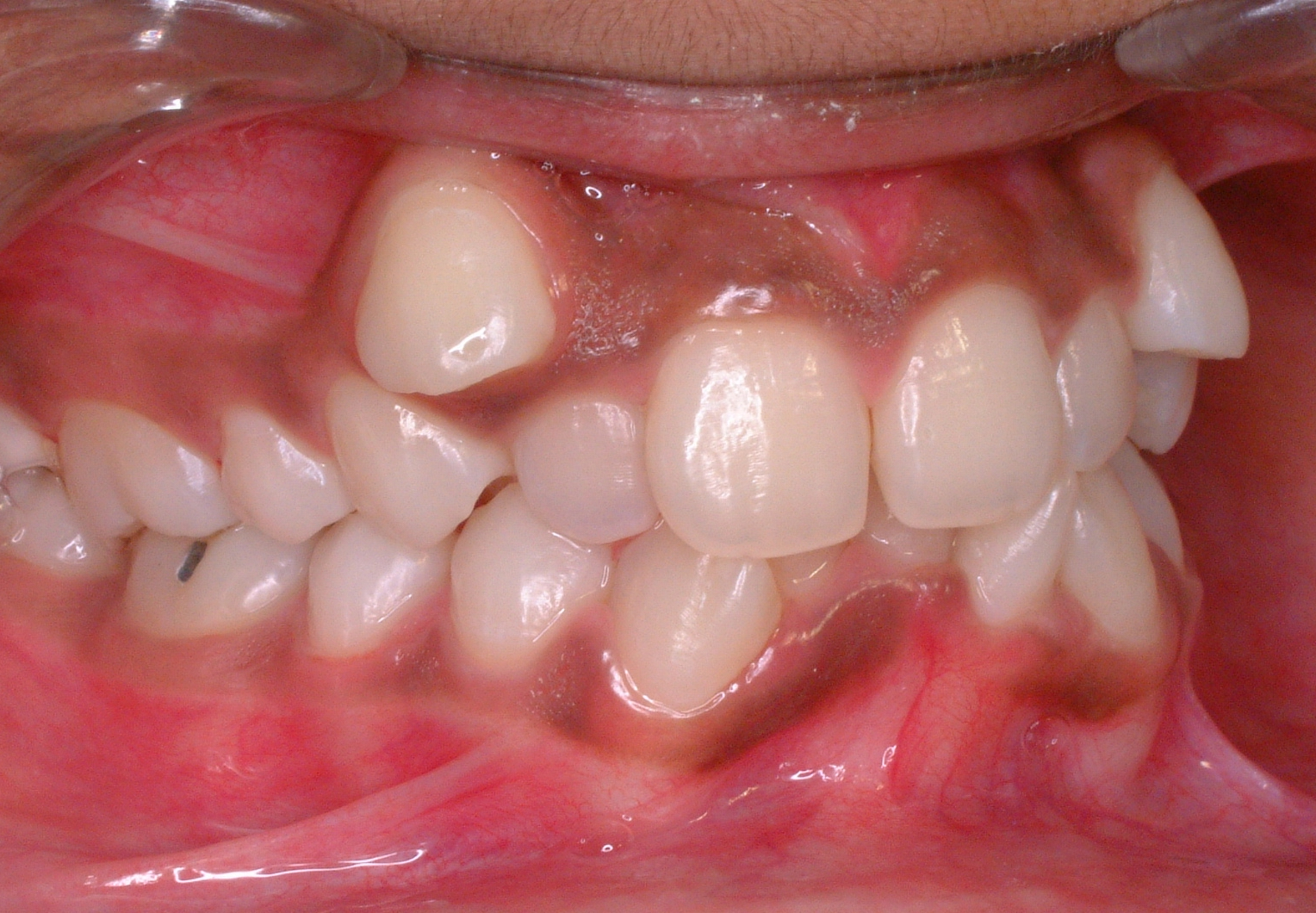
Class I with severe crowding and labially erupted canines

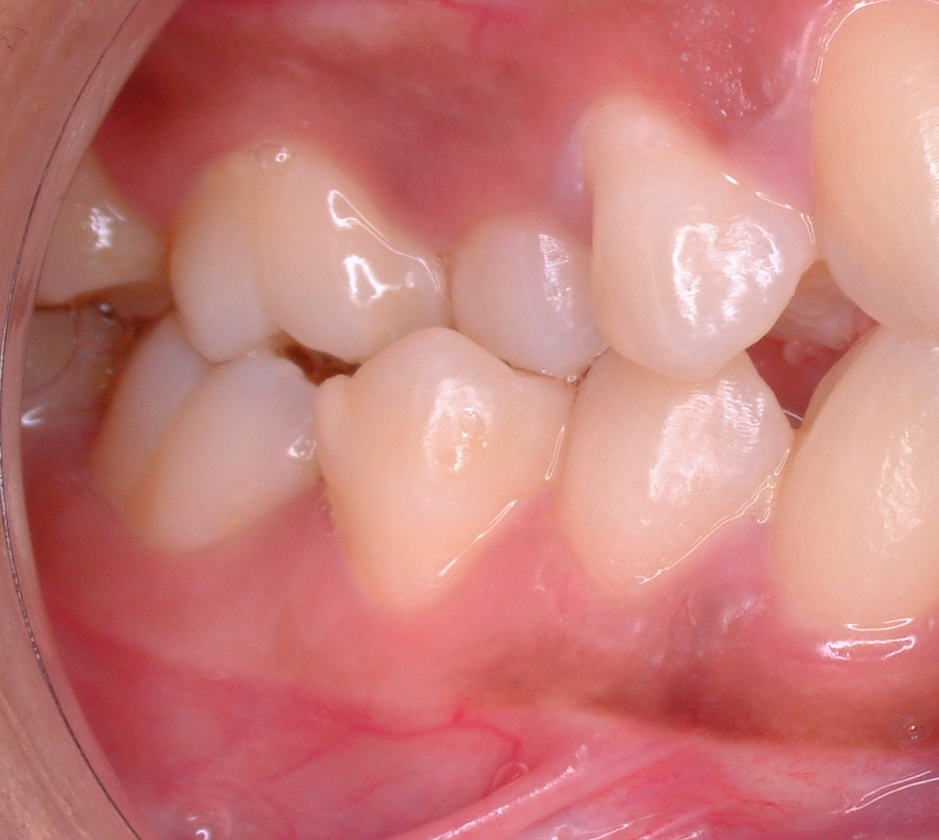
Class II molar relationship

Edward Angle, who is considered the father of modern orthodontics, was the first to classify malocclusion. He based his classifications on the relative position of the maxillary first molar. According to Angle, the mesiobuccal cusp of the upper first molar should align with the buccal groove of the mandibular first molar. The teeth should all fit on a line of occlusion, which, in the upper arch, is a smooth curve through the central fossae of the posterior teeth and cingulum of the canines and incisors, and in the lower arch, is a smooth curve through the buccal cusps of the posterior teeth and incisal edges of the anterior teeth. Any variations from this resulted in malocclusion types. It is also possible to have different classes of malocclusion on the left and right sides.

- Class I (Neutrocclusion): Here, the molar relationship of the occlusion is normal but the incorrect line of occlusion or as described for the maxillary first molar, but the other teeth have problems like spacing, crowding, over or under eruption, etc.
- Class II (Distocclusion (retrognathism, overjet, overbite), In this situation, the mesiobuccal cusp of the upper first molar is not aligned with the mesiobuccal groove of the lower first molar. Instead it is anterior to it. Usually, the mesiobuccal cusp rests between the first mandibular molars and second premolars. There are two subtypes:
  - Class II Division 1: The molar relationships are like those of Class II, and the anterior teeth are protruded.
  - Class II Division 2: The molar relationships are Class II, but the central teeth are retroclined, and the lateral teeth are seen overlapping the centrals.
- Class III: (Mesiocclusion (prognathism, anterior crossbite, negative overjet, underbite)) In this case, the upper molars are placed not in the mesiobuccal groove but posteriorly to it. The mesiobuccal cusp of the maxillary first molar lies posterior to the mesiobuccal groove of the mandibular first molar. Usually seen when the lower front teeth are more prominent than the upper front teeth. In this case, the patient very often has a large mandible or a short maxillary bone.

=== Review of Angle's system of classes and alternative systems ===
A major disadvantage of Angle's system of classifying malocclusions is that it only considers two dimensions along a spatial axis in the sagittal plane in the terminal occlusion, but occlusion problems can be three-dimensional. It does not recognise deviations in other spatial axes, asymmetric deviations, functional faults, and other therapy-related features.

Angle's classification system also lacks a theoretical basis; it is purely descriptive. Its much-discussed weaknesses include that it only considers static occlusion, it does not account for the development and causes (aetiology) of occlusion problems, and it disregards the proportions (or relationships in general) of teeth and face. Thus, many attempts have been made to modify the Angle system or to replace it completely with a more efficient one, but Angle's classification continues to be popular mainly because of its simplicity and clarity.

Well-known modifications to Angle's classification date back to Martin Dewey (1915) and Benno Lischer (1912, 1933). Alternative systems have been suggested by, among others, Simon (1930, the first three-dimensional classification system), Jacob A. Salzmann (1950, with a classification system based on skeletal structures), and James L. Ackerman and William R. Proffit (1969).

=== Incisor classification ===
Besides the molar relationship, the British Standards Institute Classification also classifies malocclusion into incisor relationship and canine relationship.

- Class I: The lower incisor edges occlude with or lie immediately below the cingulum plateau of the upper central incisors.
- Class II: The lower incisor edges lie posterior to the cingulum plateau of the upper incisors.
  - Division 1 – the upper central incisors are proclined or of average inclination and there is an increase in overjet.
  - Division 2 – The upper central incisors are retroclined. The overjet is usually minimal or may be increased.
- Class III: The lower incisor edges lie anterior to the cingulum plateau of the upper incisors. The overjet is reduced or reversed.

=== Canine relationship by Ricketts ===
- Class I: Mesial slope of upper canine coincides with the distal slope of lower canine.
- Class II: Mesial slope of the upper canine is ahead of distal slope of the lower canine.
- Class III: Mesial slope of the upper canine is behind to the distal slope of the lower canine.

== Crowding of teeth ==
Dental crowding is defined by the amount of space that would be required for the teeth to be in correct alignment. It is obtained in two ways: 1) by measuring the amount of space required and reducing this by calculating the space available via the width of the teeth, or 2) by measuring the degree of overlap of the teeth.

The following criterion is used:

- 0-4mm = Mild crowding
- 4-8mm = Moderate crowding
- >8mm = Severe crowding

=== Causes ===
Genetic (inheritance) factors, extra teeth, lost teeth, impacted teeth, or abnormally shaped teeth have been cited as causes of crowding. Ill-fitting dental fillings, crowns, appliances, retainers, or braces, as well as misalignment of jaw fractures after a severe injury, are also known to cause crowding. Tumors of the mouth and jaw, thumb sucking, tongue thrusting, pacifier use beyond age three, and prolonged use of a bottle have also been identified.

Lack of masticatory stress during development can cause tooth overcrowding. Children who chewed a hard resinous gum for two hours a day showed increased facial growth. Experiments in animals have shown similar results. In an experiment on two groups of rock hyraxes fed hardened or softened versions of the same foods, the animals fed softer food had significantly narrower and shorter faces and thinner and shorter mandibles than animals fed hard food.

A 2016 review found that breastfeeding lowers the incidence of malocclusions developing later on in developing infants.

During the transition to agriculture, the shape of the human mandible went through a series of changes. The mandible underwent complex shape changes not matched by the teeth, leading to incongruity between the dental and mandibular form. These changes in human skulls may have been "driven by the decreasing bite forces required to chew the processed foods eaten once humans switched to growing different types of cereals, milking and herding animals about 10,000 years ago."

== Treatment ==
Malocclusion is often treated with orthodontics, such as tooth extraction, clear aligners, or dental braces, followed by growth modification in children or jaw surgery (orthognathic surgery) in adults. Surgical intervention is used only on rare occasions. This may include surgical reshaping to lengthen or shorten the jaw. Wires, plates, or screws may be used to secure the jawbone in a manner like the surgical stabilization of jaw fractures. Very few people have "perfect" alignment of their teeth, with most problems being minor and not requiring treatment.

=== Crowding ===
Crowding of the teeth is treated with orthodontics, often with tooth extraction, clear aligners, or dental braces, followed by growth modification in children or jaw surgery (orthognathic surgery) in adults. Surgery may be required on rare occasions. This may include surgical reshaping to lengthen or shorten the jaw (orthognathic surgery). Wires, plates, or screws may be used to secure the jawbone in a manner similar to the surgical stabilization of jaw fractures. Very few people have "perfect" alignment of their teeth. However, most problems are very minor and do not require treatment.

=== Class I ===
While treatment is not crucial in class I malocclusions, in severe cases of crowding, it can be an indication for intervention. Studies indicate that tooth extraction can have benefits in correcting malocclusion in individuals. Further research is needed as recurring crowding has been examined in other clinical trials.

=== Class II ===
A few treatment options for class II malocclusions include:

1. A functional appliance that maintains the mandible in a postured position to influence both the orofacial musculature and dentoalveolar development prior to fixed appliance therapy. This is ideally done through pubertal growth in pre-adolescent children and the fixed appliance during permanent dentition. Different types of removable appliances include Activator, Bionator, Medium opening activator, Herbst, Frankel, and twin block appliance, with the twin block being the most widely used one.
2. Growth modification through headgear to redirect maxillary growth.
3. Orthodontic camouflage so that the jaw discrepancy is no longer apparent.
4. Orthognathic surgery – sagittal split osteotomy mandibular advancement is carried out when growth is complete, where skeletal discrepancy is severe in anterior-posterior relationship or in the vertical direction. A fixed appliance is required before, during, and after surgery.
5. Upper Removable Appliance – limited role in contemporary treatment of increased overjets. Mostly used for very mild Class II, overjet due to incisor proclination, and favourable overbite.

==== Class II Division 1 ====
Low- to moderate- quality evidence suggests that providing early orthodontic treatment for children with prominent upper front teeth (class II division 1) is more effective for reducing the incidence of incisal trauma than providing one course of orthodontic treatment in adolescence. There do not appear to be any other advantages of providing early treatment when compared to late treatment. Low-quality evidence suggests that, compared to no treatment, late treatment in adolescence with functional appliances is effective for reducing the prominence of upper front teeth.

==== Class II Division 2 ====
Treatment can be undertaken using orthodontic treatments using dental braces. While treatment is carried out, there is no evidence from clinical trials to recommend or discourage any type of orthodontic treatment in children. A 2018 Cochrane systematic review anticipated that the evidence base supporting treatment approaches is not likely to improve occlusion due to the low prevalence of the condition and the ethical difficulties in recruiting people to participate in a randomized controlled trial for treating this condition.

=== Class III ===
The British Standard Institute (BSI) classifies class III incisor relationship as the lower incisor edge lies anterior to the cingulum plateau of the upper incisors, with reduced or reversed overjet. The skeletal facial deformity is characterized by mandibular prognathism, maxillary retrognathism, or a combination of the two. This affects 3-8% of the UK population, with a higher incidence seen in Asia.

One of the main reasons for correcting Class III malocclusion is aesthetics and function. This can have a psychological impact on the person with malocclusion, resulting in speech and mastication problems as well. In mild class III cases, the patient is quite accepting of the aesthetics, and the situation is monitored to observe the progression of skeletal growth.

Maxillary and mandibular skeletal changes during prepubertal, pubertal, and postpubertal stages show that class III malocclusion is established before the prepubertal stage. One treatment option is the use of growth modification appliances such as the Chin Cap, which has greatly improved the skeletal framework in the initial stages. However, the majority of cases are shown to relapse into inherited class III malocclusion during the pubertal growth stage and when the appliance is removed after treatment.

Another approach is to carry out orthognathic surgery, such as a bilateral sagittal split osteotomy (BSSO), which is indicated by horizontal mandibular excess. This involves surgically cutting through the mandible and moving the fragment forward or backward for the desired function and is supplemented with pre and post surgical orthodontics to ensure correct tooth relationship. Although the most common surgery of the mandible, it comes with several complications, including bleeding from the inferior alveolar artery, unfavorable splits, condylar resorption, avascular necrosis, and worsening of the temporomandibular joint.

Orthodontic camouflage can also be used in patients with mild skeletal discrepancies. This is a less invasive approach that uses orthodontic brackets to correct malocclusion and try to hide the skeletal discrepancy. Due to limitations of orthodontics, this option is more viable for patients who are not as concerned about the aesthetics of their facial appearance and are happy to address the malocclusion only, as well as avoiding the risks which come with orthognathic surgery.

=== Deep bite ===
The most common corrective treatments available are fixed or removable appliances (such as dental braces), which may or may not require surgical intervention. At this time, there is no robust evidence that treatment will be successful.

=== Open bite ===
An open bite malocclusion is when the upper teeth do not overlap the lower teeth. When this malocclusion occurs at the front teeth, it is known as an anterior open bite. An open bite is difficult to treat due to multifactorial causes, with relapse being a major concern. This is particularly so for an anterior open bite. Therefore, it is important to carry out a thorough initial assessment in order to obtain a diagnosis to tailor a suitable treatment plan. It is important to take into consideration any habitual risk factors, as this is crucial for a successful outcome without relapse. The treatment approach includes behavior changes, appliances, and surgery. Treatment for adults includes a combination of extractions, fixed appliances, intermaxillary elastics, and orthognathic surgery. For children, orthodontics is usually used to compensate for continued growth. With children with mixed dentition, the malocclusion may resolve on its own as the permanent teeth erupt. Furthermore, should the malocclusion be caused by childhood habits such as digit, thumb, or pacifier sucking, it may result in resolution as the habit is stopped. Habit deterrent appliances may be used to help in breaking digit and thumb sucking habits. Other treatment options for patients who are still growing include functional appliances and headgear appliances.

== Tooth size discrepancy ==
Identifying the presence of tooth size discrepancies between the maxillary and mandibular arches is an important component of correct orthodontic diagnosis and treatment planning.

To establish appropriate alignment and occlusion, the size of upper and lower front teeth, or upper and lower teeth in general, needs to be proportional. Inter-arch tooth size discrepancy (ITSD) is defined as a disproportion in the mesio-distal dimensions of teeth of opposing dental arches. The prevalence is clinically significant among orthodontic patients and has been reported to range from 17% to 30%.

Identifying inter-arch tooth size discrepancy (ITSD) before treatment begins allows the practitioner to develop the treatment plan in a way that will take ITSD into account. ITSD corrective treatment may entail demanding reduction (interproximal wear), increase (crowns and resins), or elimination (extractions) of dental mass prior to treatment finalization.

Several methods have been used to determine ITSD. Of these methods, the one most commonly used is the Bolton analysis. Bolton developed a method to calculate the ratio between the mesiodistal width of maxillary and mandibular teeth and stated that a correct and harmonious occlusion is possible only with adequate proportionality of tooth sizes. Bolton's formula concludes that if in the anterior portion the ratio is less than 77.2%, the lower teeth are too narrow, the upper teeth are too, wide or there is a combination of both. If the ratio is higher than 77.2%, either the lower teeth are too wide, the upper teeth are too narrow, or there is a combination of both.

== Other conditions ==
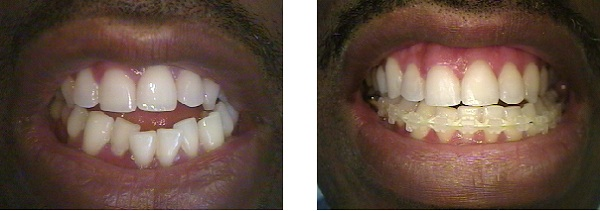
Open bite treatment after eight months of braces.

Other kinds of malocclusions can be due to horizontal, vertical, or transverse skeletal discrepancies, including skeletal asymmetries.

Increased vertical growth causes a long facial profile and commonly leads to an open bite malocclusion, while decreased vertical facial growth causes a short facial profile and is commonly associated with a deep bite malocclusion. However, there are many other more common causes for open bites (such as tongue thrusting and thumb sucking) and likewise for deep bites.

The upper or lower jaw can be overgrown (macrognathia) or undergrown (micrognathia). It has been reported that patients with micrognathia are also affected by retrognathia (abnormal posterior positioning of the mandible or maxilla relative to the facial structure). These patients are mainly predisposed to a class II malocclusion. Mandibular macrognathia results in prognathism and predisposes patients to a class III malocclusion.

Most malocclusion studies to date have focused on Class III malocclusions. Genetic studies for Class II and Class I malocclusion are rare. An example of hereditary mandibular prognathism can be seen amongst the Habsburg Royal family, where one third of the affected individuals with severe class III malocclusion had one parent with a similar phenotype

The frequent presentation of dental malocclusions in patients with craniofacial birth defects also supports a strong genetic aetiology. About 150 genes are associated with craniofacial conditions presenting with malocclusions. Micrognathia is a commonly recurring craniofacial birth defect appearing among multiple syndromes.

For patients with severe malocclusions, corrective jaw surgery or orthognathic surgery may be carried out as a part of overall treatment, which can be seen in about 5% of the general population.

== See also ==
- Crossbite
- Elastics
- Facemask (orthodontics)
- Maximum intercuspation
- Mouth breathing
- Occlusion (dentistry)
