= Circumcision =

Removal of the human foreskin

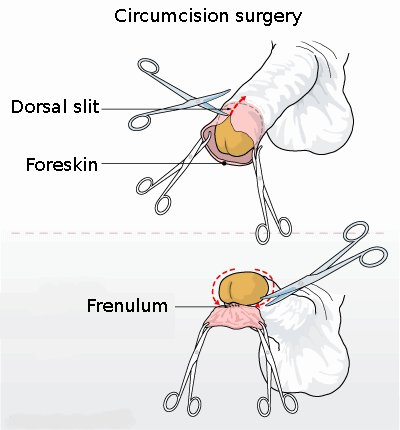
- Circumcision surgery with hemostats and scissors
- ICD-10-PCS: Z41.2
- ICD-9-CM: V50.2
- MeSH: D002944
- OPS-301 code: 5–640.2
- MedlinePlus: 002998
- eMedicine: 1015820

Circumcision is a surgical procedure that removes the foreskin from the human penis. In the procedure's most common form, the foreskin is extended with forceps, then a circumcision device may be placed, after which the foreskin is excised. Topical or locally injected anesthesia is generally used to reduce pain and physiologic stress. Circumcision is undertaken for religious, cultural, social, and medical reasons. It may be medically necessary in cases of phimosis, chronic urinary tract infections (UTIs), and other pathologies of the penis that do not resolve with other treatments. The procedure is contraindicated in cases of certain genital structure abnormalities or poor general health.

The procedure is associated with reduced rates of urinary tract infections and sexually transmitted infections including incidence of cancer-causing forms of human papillomavirus (HPV), and is known to reduce HIV transmission among heterosexual men in high-risk populations by up to 60%; its prophylactic efficacy against HIV transmission in the developed world or among men who have sex with men is debated. Neonatal circumcision decreases the risk of penile cancer. Complication rates increase significantly with age. Bleeding, infection, and the removal of either too much or too little foreskin are the most common acute complications, while meatal stenosis is the most common long-term. There are various cultural, social, legal, and ethical views on circumcision. Major medical organizations hold differing views on circumcision's prophylactic efficacy in developed countries. Some medical organizations take the position that it carries prophylactic health benefits that outweigh the risks, while others hold that its medical benefits are not sufficient to justify it.

Circumcision is one of the world's most common and oldest medical procedures, with 37–39% of men globally circumcised. Prophylactic usage originated in England during the 1850s and has since spread globally, becoming established as a way to prevent sexually transmitted infections. Beyond use as a prophylactic or treatment option in healthcare, circumcision plays a major role in many of the world's cultures and religions, most prominently Judaism and Islam. Circumcision is among the most important commandments in Judaism and considered obligatory. In some African and Eastern Christian denominations male circumcision is required. It is widespread in the United States, South Korea, the Philippines, Israel, Muslim-majority countries, and most of Africa. It is relatively rare for non-religious reasons in Latin America, Europe, Australia, New Zealand, most of Asia, and parts of Southern Africa. The origin of circumcision is not known with certainty, but the oldest documentation comes from ancient Egypt.

== Uses ==
=== Disease prevention ===
Approximately half of all circumcisions worldwide are performed for reasons of prophylactic healthcare.

==== Prophylactic usage in high-risk populations ====
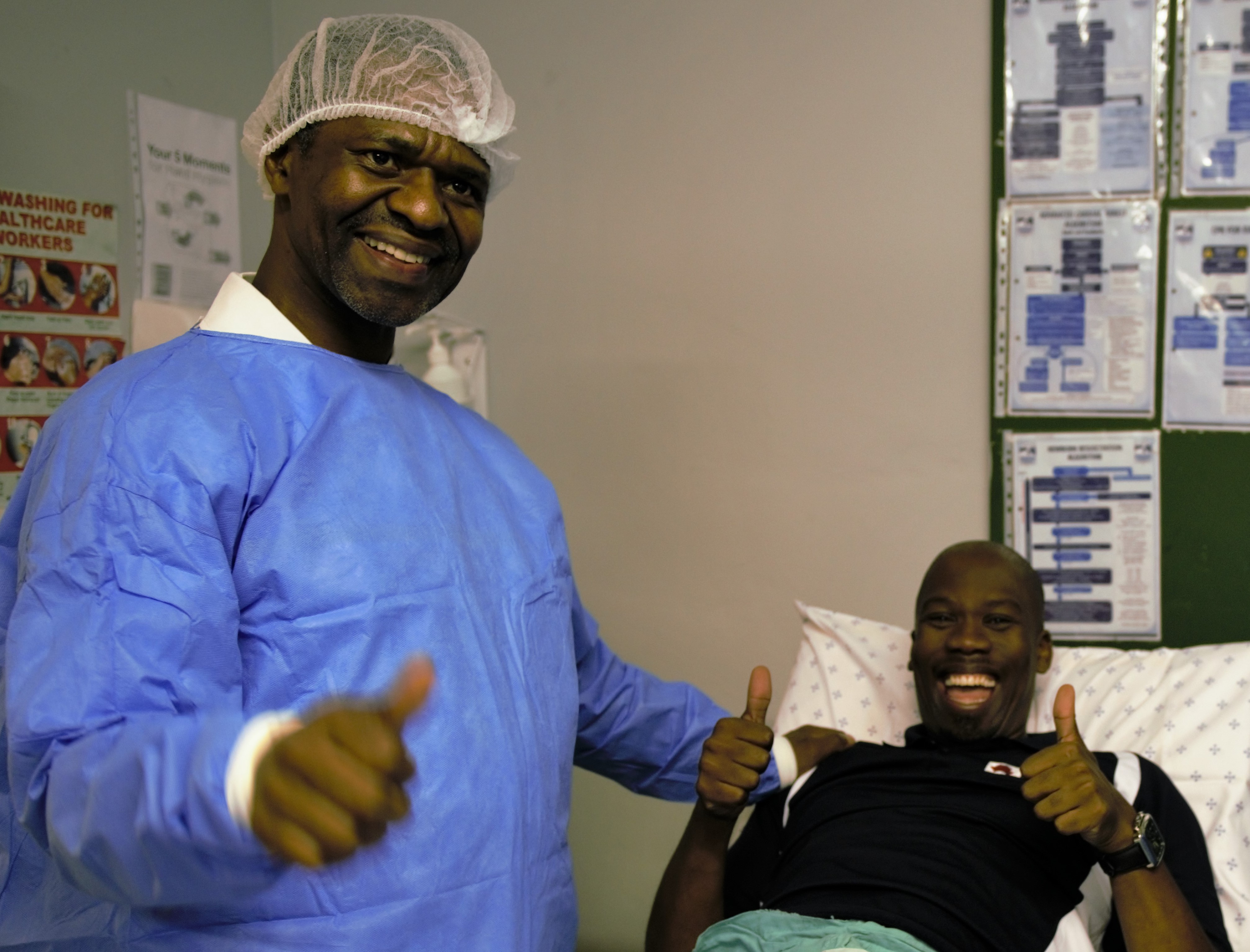
Actor Melusi Yeni became the 1 millionth VMMC against HIV/AIDS transmission in the province of KwaZulu-Natal, South Africa.

There is a consensus among the world's major medical organizations and in the academic literature that circumcision is an efficacious intervention for HIV prevention in high-risk populations if carried out by medical professionals under safe conditions.

In 2007, the WHO and the Joint United Nations Programme on HIV/AIDS (UNAIDS) recommended adolescent and adult circumcision as part of a comprehensive program for prevention of HIV transmission in areas with high endemic rates of HIV, as long as the program includes "informed consent, confidentiality, and absence of coercion"—known as voluntary medical male circumcision, or VMMC. In 2010, this expanded to routine neonatal circumcision, as long as the infant's parents consented. In 2020, the WHO again concluded that male circumcision is an efficacious intervention for HIV prevention and that male circumcision is an essential strategy, in addition to other measures, to prevent heterosexually acquired HIV infection in men. Eastern and southern Africa had a particularly low prevalence of circumcised males. This region has a disproportionately high HIV infection rate, with a significant number of infections stemming from heterosexual transmission. As a result, the promotion of prophylactic circumcision has been a priority intervention in that region since the WHO's 2007 recommendations. The International Antiviral Society–USA also suggests circumcision be discussed with men who have insertive anal sex with men, especially in regions where HIV is common. There is evidence that circumcision is associated with a reduced risk of HIV infection for such men, particularly in low-income countries.

The finding that circumcision significantly reduces female-to-male HIV transmission has prompted medical organizations serving communities affected by endemic HIV/AIDS to promote circumcision as a method of controlling the spread of HIV.

==== Prophylactic usage in developed countries ====
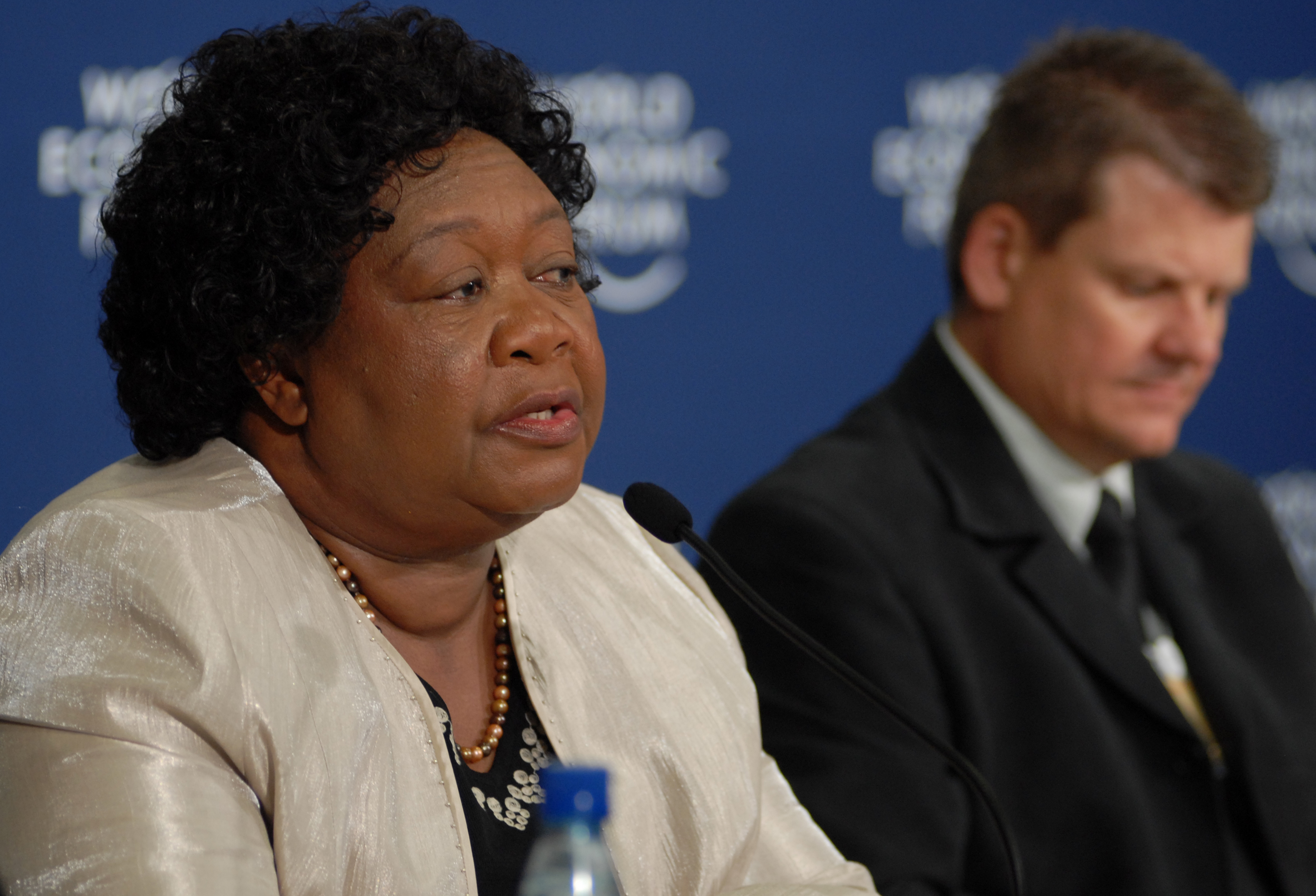
Elizabeth Mataka, UN Secretary-General's Special Envoy for AIDS in Africa, speaking at the session "From Evidence to Implementation: Promoting Male Circumcision in Africa" during the World Economic Forum on Africa 2009 in Cape Town, South Africa, 11 June 2009.

Major medical organizations hold varying positions on the prophylactic efficacy of the elective circumcision of minors in developed countries. Literature on the matter is polarized, with the cost-benefit analysis highly dependent on the kinds and frequencies of health problems in the population under discussion and how circumcision affects them.

The World Health Organization (WHO), UNAIDS, and American medical organizations take the position that its prophylactic health benefits outweigh the risks, while European, Australian, and New Zealand medical organizations generally hold that its medical benefits are insufficient to justify it. Advocates of circumcision recommend performing it during the neonatal period when it is less expensive and has a lower risk of complications. The American Academy of Pediatrics, American College of Obstetricians and Gynecologists, and Centers for Disease Control and Prevention have said that circumcision's potential benefits outweigh the risks.

In 2010, the World Health Organization said:

There are significant benefits in performing male circumcision in early infancy, and programmes that promote early infant male circumcision are likely to have lower morbidity rates and lower costs than programmes targeting adolescent boys and men.

=== Pathologies ===
Circumcision is also used to treat various pathologies. These include pathological phimosis, refractory balanoposthitis and chronic or recurrent urinary tract infections (UTIs).

== Contraindications ==
Circumcision is contraindicated in certain cases.

These include infants with certain genital structure abnormalities, such as a misplaced urethral opening (as in hypospadias and epispadias), curvature of the head of the penis (chordee), or ambiguous genitalia, because the foreskin may be needed for reconstructive surgery. Circumcision is contraindicated in premature infants and those who are not clinically stable and in good health.

If a person is known to have or has a family history of serious bleeding disorders such as hemophilia, it is recommended that the blood be checked for normal coagulation properties before the procedure is attempted.

== Technique ==
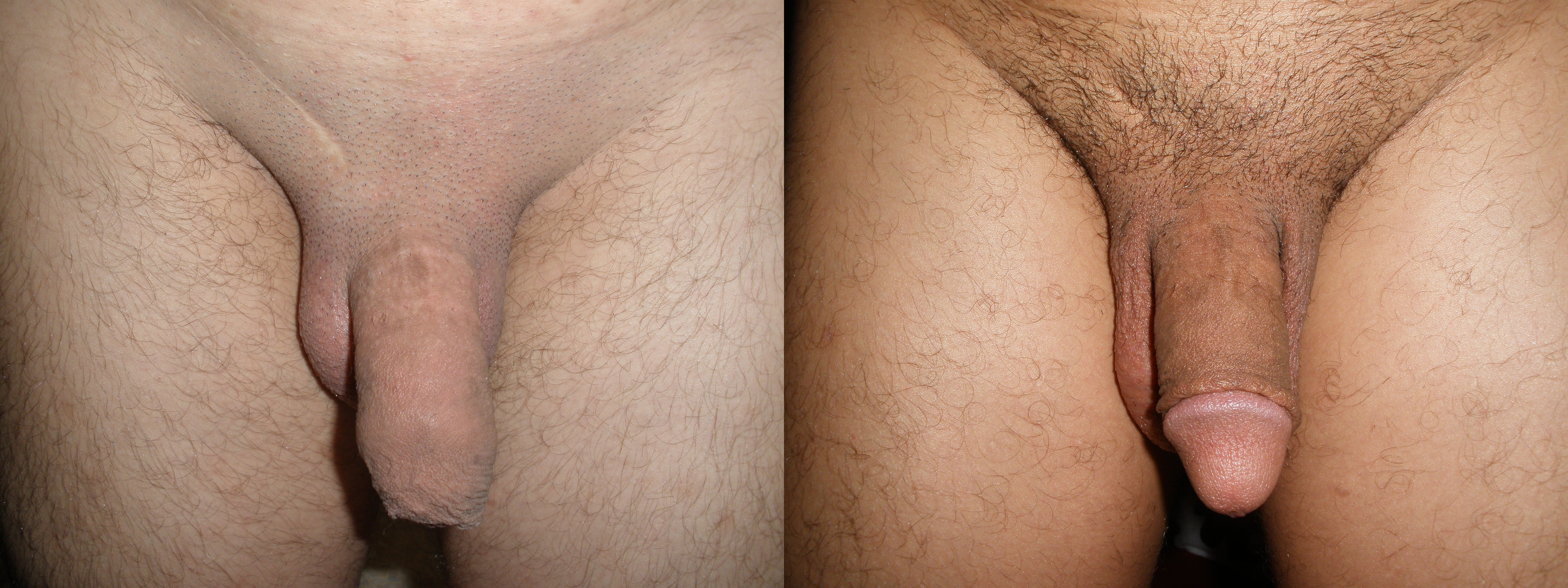
Before (left) and after (right) an adult circumcision that was undertaken to treat phimosis. After the operation, the glans is exposed even when the penis is flaccid.

The foreskin is the double-layered fold of tissue at the distal end of the human penis that covers the glans and the urinary meatus. Different amounts of skin can be removed during circumcision. The practice is differentiated from other surgeries for the treatment of phimosis or treatment-resistant infection by the complete removal of the preputial orifice.

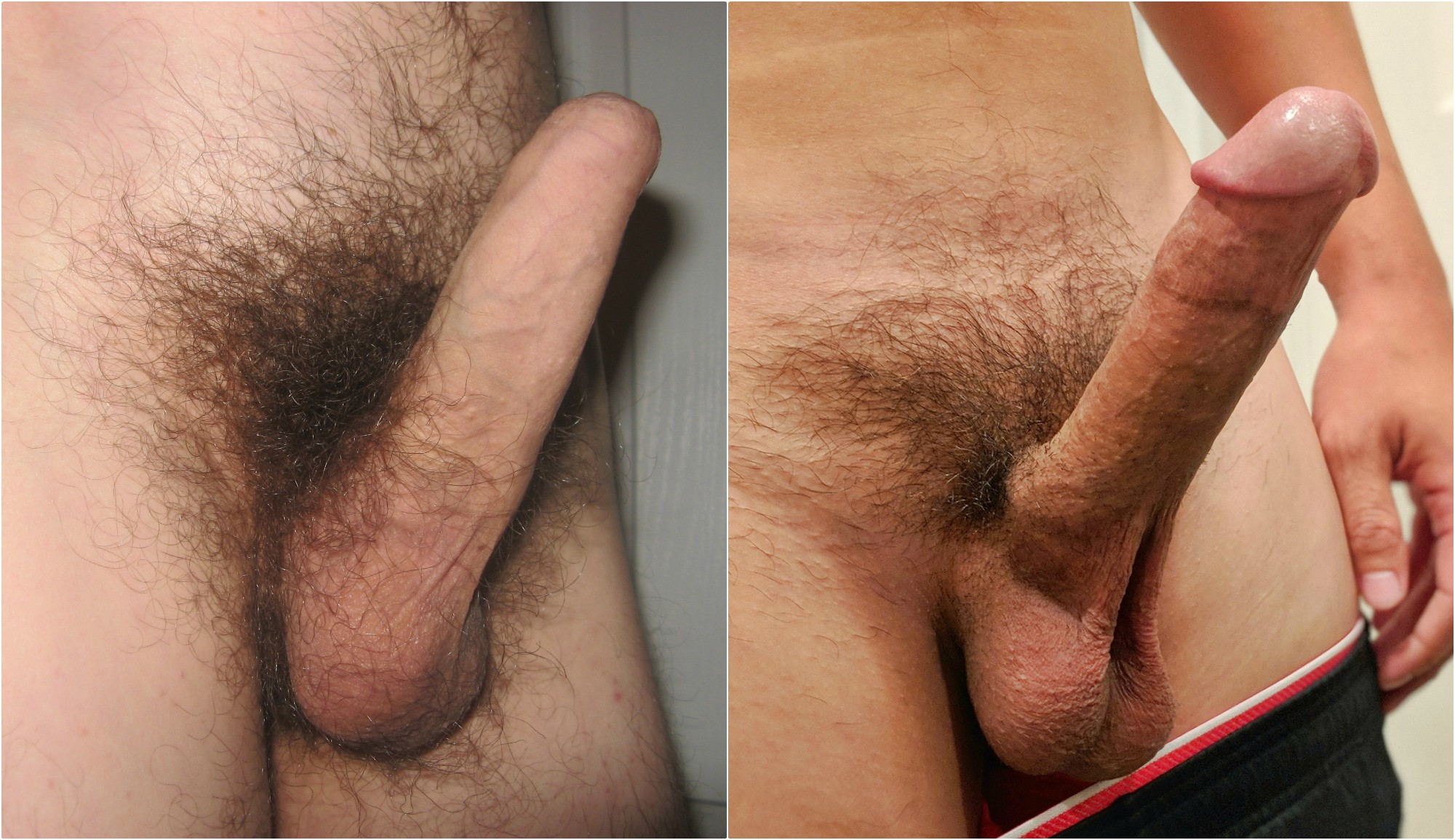
Erect comparison of the penis, one (left) is uncircumcised, while the other (right) is circumcised

For adult medical circumcision, superficial wound healing takes up to a week, and complete healing 4 to 6 months. For infants, healing is usually complete within one week.

=== Removal of the foreskin ===
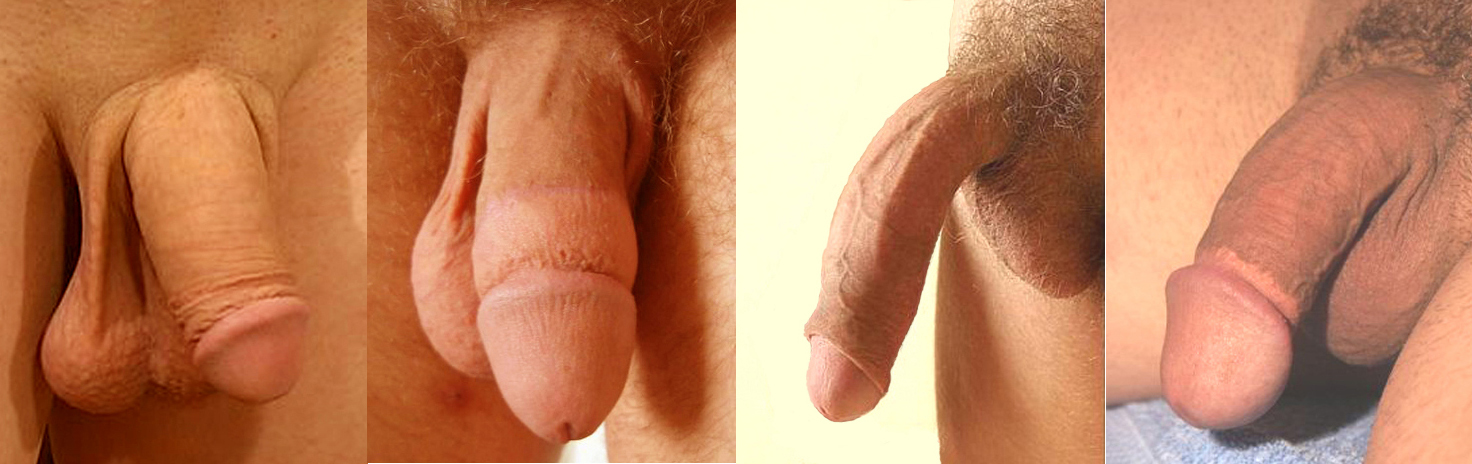
Different circumcision results based on cut placement and skin tension (left to right): high & loose, high & tight, low & loose, low & tight.

For infant circumcision, devices such as the Gomco clamp, Plastibell and Mogen clamp are commonly used in the USA. These follow the same basic procedure. First, the amount of foreskin to be removed is estimated. The practitioner opens the foreskin via the preputial orifice to reveal the glans underneath and ensures it is normal before bluntly separating the inner lining of the foreskin (preputial epithelium) from its attachment to the glans. The practitioner then places the circumcision device (this sometimes requires a dorsal slit), which remains until blood flow has stopped. Finally, the foreskin is amputated. For older babies and adults, circumcision is often performed surgically without specialized instruments, and alternatives such as Unicirc, Shang ring or stapler circumcision are available.Depending on the specific surgical technique or anatomical requirements, the frenulum—an elastic band of tissue on the underside of the penis—may be either preserved or excised during the surgery. If this tissue is removed concurrently, the adjunctive procedure is known as a penile frenulectomy.

=== Pain management ===
The circumcision procedure causes pain, and for neonates this pain may interfere with mother-infant interaction or cause other behavioral changes, so the use of analgesia is advocated and required by law in some countries. Ordinary procedural pain may be managed in pharmacological and non-pharmacological ways. Pharmacological methods, such as localized or regional pain-blocking injections and topical analgesic creams, are safe and effective. The ring block and dorsal penile nerve block (DPNB) are the most effective at reducing pain, and the ring block may be more effective than the DPNB. They are more effective than EMLA (eutectic mixture of local anesthetics) cream, which is more effective than a placebo. Topical creams have been found to irritate the skin of low birth weight infants, so penile nerve block techniques are recommended in this group. Circumcision is contraindicated for premature babies partially because of complications with anesthesia.

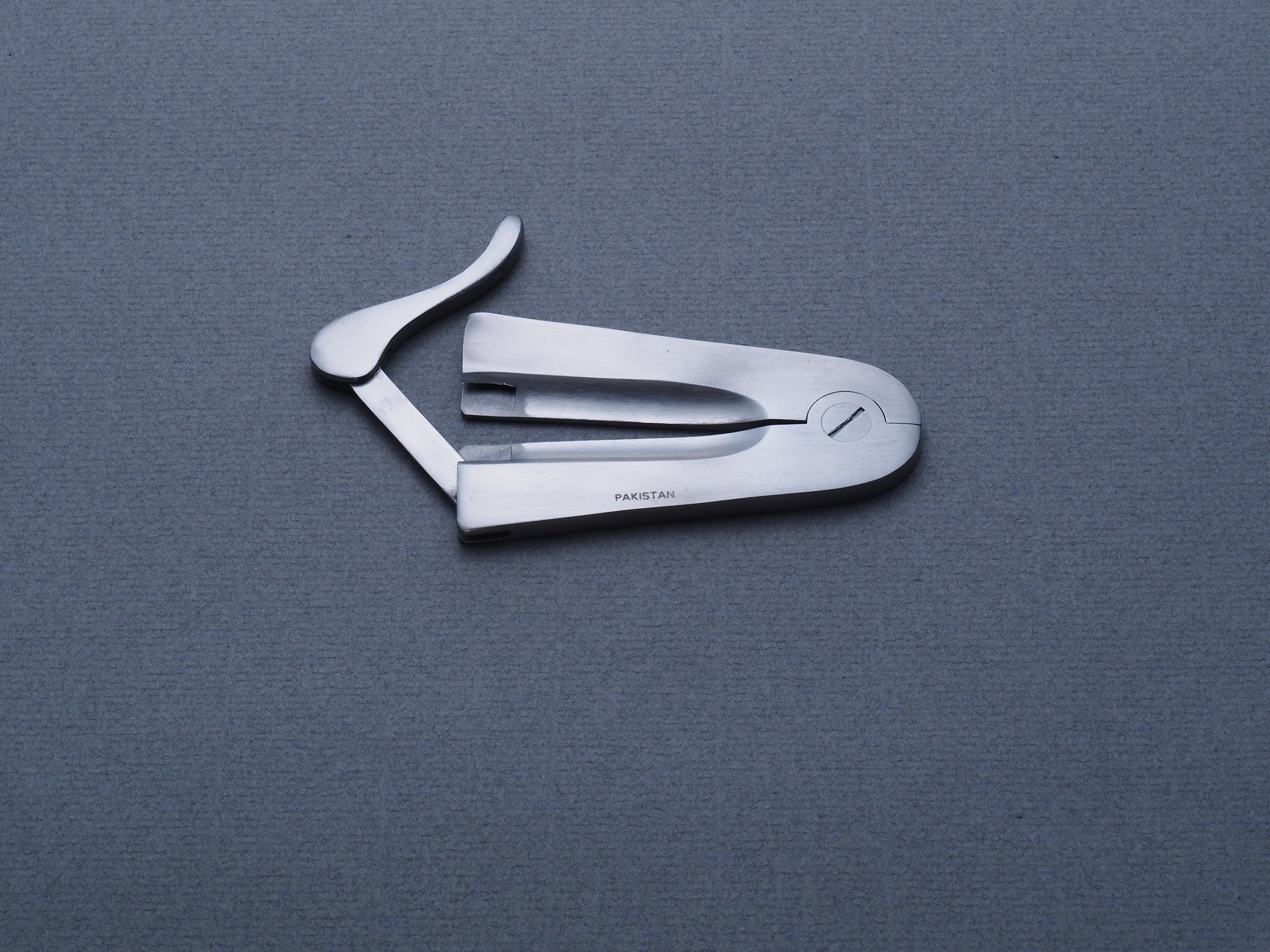
An open Mogen Clamp. In use the foreskin would be pulled through the opening and then the clamp closed and locked, crushing the foreskin.

For infants, non-pharmacological methods such as the use of a comfortable, padded chair and a sucrose or non-sucrose pacifier are more effective at reducing pain than a placebo, but the American Academy of Pediatrics (AAP) states that such methods are insufficient alone and should be used to supplement more effective techniques. A quicker procedure reduces duration of pain; use of the Mogen clamp was found to result in a shorter procedure time and less pain-induced stress than the use of the Gomco clamp or the Plastibell. The available evidence does not indicate that post-procedure pain management is needed. Some doctors recommend the use of petroleum jelly to prevent blood from adhering the genitals to the diaper during healing. For adults, topical anesthesia, ring block, dorsal penile nerve block (DPNB) and general anesthesia are all options, and the procedure requires four to six weeks of abstinence from masturbation or intercourse to allow the wound to heal.

=== Healing and tissue remodeling ===
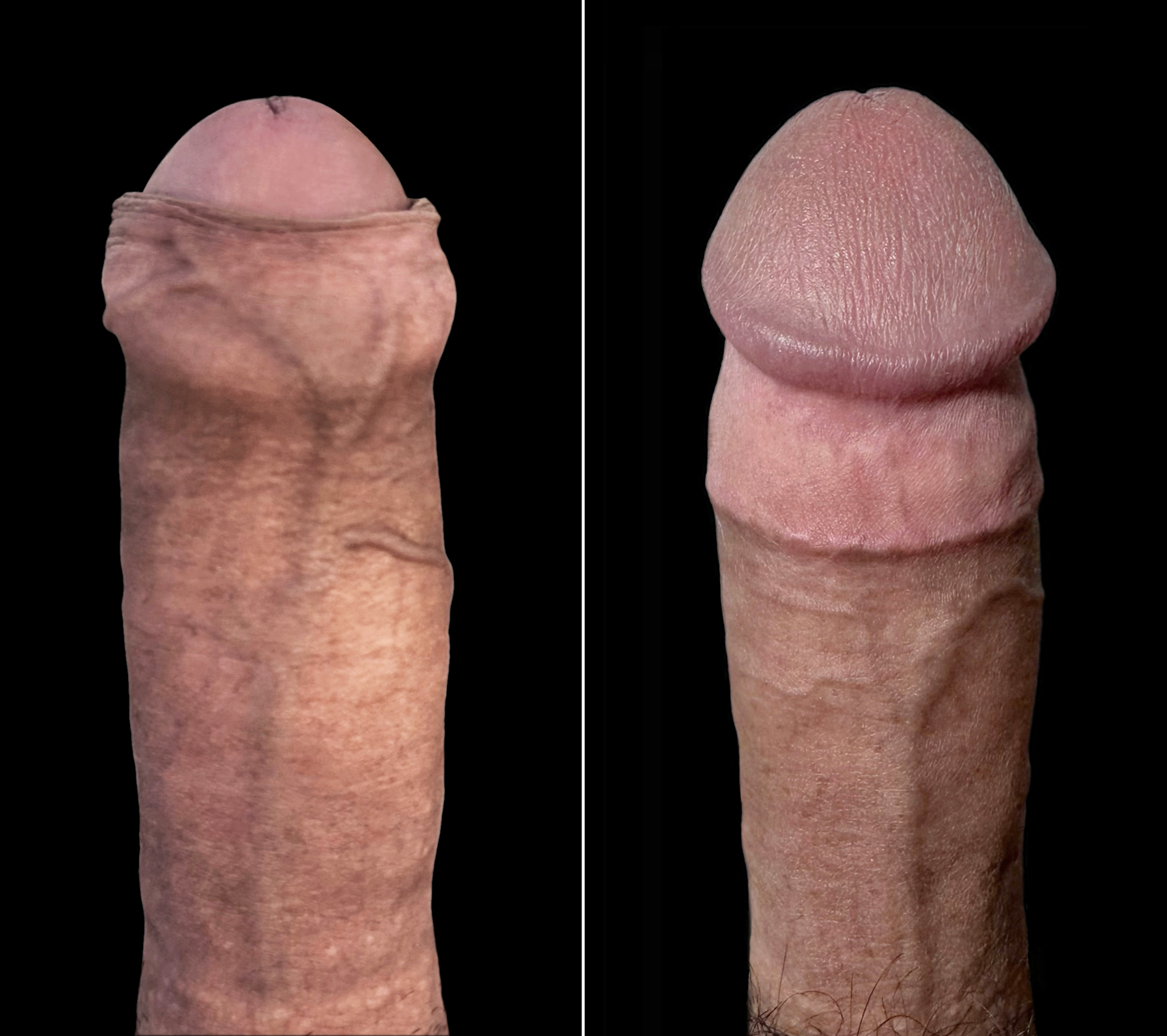
Before (left) and after (right) comparison of the penile appearance following the procedure. The healed state (right) illustrates the physical results of structural tissue remodeling.

Following the excision of the foreskin, the surgical wound undergoes the standard physiological phases of healing: hemostasis, inflammation, cellular proliferation, and tissue remodeling. Because circumcision severs the dense network of superficial blood vessels and lymphatic channels within the prepuce and dartos fascia, normal fluid drainage is temporarily interrupted. This disruption to the lymphatic system typically results in localized post-operative edema (swelling) around the incision line and the remaining mucosal collar.

During the proliferative and remodeling phases of recovery, the body undergoes angiogenesis (the formation of new blood vessels) and lymphangiogenesis. The vascular and lymphatic networks are gradually reconstructed to establish new collateral drainage pathways across the surgical boundary. As this structural tissue remodeling matures over the weeks following the procedure, the post-operative swelling resolves and physiological fluid balance is restored to the penile skin.

== Effects ==
=== Sexually transmitted infections ===
==== Human immunodeficiency virus ====
Male circumcision reduces the risk of human immunodeficiency virus (HIV) transmission from HIV positive women to men in high risk populations. In 2020, the World Health Organization (WHO) reiterated that male circumcision is an efficacious intervention for HIV prevention in high-risk countries if carried out by medical professionals under safe conditions. Circumcision reduces the risk that a man will acquire HIV and other sexually transmitted infections (STIs) from an infected female partner through vaginal sex. Circumcision has been shown to help reduce transmission of HIV to men who have sex with men (MSM) who are primarily-insertive. The effectiveness of using circumcision to prevent HIV in the developed world is not determined.

==== Human papillomavirus ====
Human papillomavirus (HPV) is the most commonly transmitted sexually transmitted infection, affecting both men and women. While most infections are asymptomatic and are cleared by the immune system, some types of the virus cause genital warts, and other types, if untreated, cause various forms of cancer, including cervical cancer and penile cancer. Genital warts and cervical cancer are the two most common problems resulting from HPV.

Circumcision is associated with a reduced prevalence of oncogenic types of HPV infection, meaning that a randomly selected circumcised man is less likely to be infected with cancer-causing types of HPV than an uncircumcised man. It also decreases the likelihood of multiple infections. As of 2012, there was no strong evidence that it reduces the rate of new HPV infection, but the procedure is associated with increased clearance of the virus by the body, which can account for the finding of reduced prevalence. HPV vaccination is the best method to prevent infection from HPV.

Although genital warts are caused by a type of HPV, there is no statistically significant relationship between being circumcised and the presence of genital warts.

==== Other infections ====
Studies evaluating the effect of circumcision on the rates of other sexually transmitted infections have, generally, found it to be protective. A 2006 meta-analysis found that circumcision was associated with lower rates of syphilis, chancroid, and possibly genital herpes. A 2010 review found that circumcision reduced the incidence of HSV-2 (herpes simplex virus, type 2) infections by 28%. The researchers found mixed results for protection against trichomonas vaginalis and chlamydia trachomatis, and no evidence of protection against gonorrhea or syphilis. It may also possibly protect against syphilis in MSM.

=== Phimosis, balanitis and balanoposthitis ===
Phimosis is the inability to retract the foreskin over the glans penis. At birth, the foreskin cannot be retracted due to adhesions between the foreskin and glans, and this is considered normal (physiological phimosis). Over time the foreskin naturally separates from the glans, and a majority of boys are able to retract the foreskin by age three. Less than one percent are still having problems at age 18. If the inability to do so becomes problematic (pathological phimosis) circumcision is a treatment option. A preputioplasty, where the foreskin is surgically widened instead of removed, is another possible surgical treatment option for phimosis. This pathological phimosis may be due to scarring from the skin disease balanitis xerotica obliterans (BXO), repeated episodes of balanoposthitis or forced retraction of the foreskin. Steroid creams are also a reasonable option and may prevent the need for surgery including in those with mild BXO. The procedure may also be used to prevent the development of phimosis. Phimosis is also a complication that can result from circumcision.

An inflammation of the glans penis and foreskin is called balanoposthitis, and the condition affecting the glans alone is called balanitis. Most cases of these conditions occur in uncircumcised males, affecting 4–11% of that group. The moist, warm space underneath the foreskin is thought to facilitate the growth of pathogens, particularly when hygiene is poor. Yeasts, especially Candida albicans, are the most common penile infection and are rarely identified in samples taken from circumcised males. Both conditions are usually treated with topical antibiotics (metronidazole cream) and antifungals (clotrimazole cream) or low-potency steroid creams. Circumcision is a treatment option for refractory or recurrent balanoposthitis, but in the twenty-first century the availability of the other treatments has made it less necessary.

Phimosis also greatly increases the relative risk of penile cancer, and neonatal circumcision has been show to nearly eliminate this risk; however, risk-benefit considerations around the use of circumcision as a cancer-preventive measure are a source of debate. Only 1% of males have phimosis by age 17. The mitigating effect circumcision has on the risk factor introduced by the possibility of phimosis is secondary, in that the removal of the foreskin eliminates the possibility of phimosis. This can be inferred from study results that show uncircumcised men with no history of phimosis are equally likely to have penile cancer as circumcised men.

=== Urinary tract infections ===
A UTI affects parts of the urinary system including the urethra, bladder, and kidneys. There is about a 1% risk of UTIs in boys under two years old, and most incidents occur in the first year of life. There is good but not ideal evidence that circumcision reduces the incidence of UTIs in boys under two, and there is fair evidence that the reduction in incidence is by a factor of 3 to 10 (100 circumcisions prevent one UTI). Circumcision is most likely to benefit boys who have a high risk of UTIs due to anatomical defects and may be used to treat recurrent UTIs.

There is a plausible biological explanation for the reduction in UTI risk after circumcision. The orifice through which urine passes at the tip of the penis (the urinary meatus) hosts more urinary system disease-causing bacteria in uncircumcised boys than in circumcised boys, especially in those under six months of age. As these bacteria are a risk factor for UTIs, circumcision may reduce the risk of UTIs through a decrease in the bacterial population.

=== Other cancer causes ===
The principal risks for penile cancer are HPV, Phimosis and smoking. There is also an association between adult circumcision and an increased risk of invasive penile cancer; this is believed to be from men being circumcised as a treatment for penile cancer or a condition that is a precursor to cancer rather than a consequence of circumcision itself.

There is some evidence that circumcision is associated with reduced risk of prostate cancer.

=== Women's health ===
Sexual intercourse between women and circumcised, as compared to uncircumcised, men is associated with a decreased risk of cervical cancer, cervical dysplasia, HSV-2, chlamydia, and syphilis among women. The evidence is less consistent in regard to an association of circumcision with women's risk of HPV and HIV.

=== Sexual effects ===
From the available evidence, it seems men who have been circumcised with the aid of a circumcision device experience unchanged or heightened sexual pleasure and satisfaction. There is some evidence such men also derive long time improvements in erectile function.

The accumulated data show circumcision has no adverse physiological effect on sexual pleasure, function, desire, or fertility. There is some evidence that circumcision has no effect on pain with intercourse, premature ejaculation, intravaginal ejaculation latency time, erectile dysfunction, or difficulties with orgasm. There are popular misconceptions that circumcision benefits or adversely affects the sexual pleasure of the circumcised person.

According to a 2014 review, the effect of circumcision on sexual partners' experiences is unclear as it has not been well studied. According to a policy statement by the Canadian Paediatric Society that was reaffirmed in 2021, "medical studies do not support circumcision as having an impact on sexual function or satisfaction for partners of circumcised individuals".

== Adverse effects ==
Neonatal circumcision is generally a safe, low-risk procedure when done by an experienced practitioner.

The most common acute complications are excessive bleeding, infection and the removal of either too much or too little foreskin. These complications occur in approximately 0.13% of procedures, with bleeding being the most common acute complication in the United States. Minor complications are reported to occur in approximately 3.8%. Severe complications are rare. A specific complication rate is difficult to determine due to inconsistencies in classification. Complication rates are greater when the procedure is performed by an inexperienced operator, in unsterile conditions, and older patient age. In patients circumcised after the neonatal period and into adolescence, minor complication rates rise from approximately 1.5% in neonates to about 6% in adolescents. This increase is believed to be a result of increased foreskin vascularity. Significant acute complications happen rarely, occurring in about 1 in 500 newborn procedures in the United States. Severe to catastrophic complications, including death, are so rare that they are reported only as individual case reports. Where a Plastibell device is used, the most common complication is the retention of the device occurring in around 3.5% of procedures. Other possible complications include buried penis, chordee, phimosis, skin bridges, urethral fistulas, and meatal stenosis. These complications may be partly avoided with proper technique, and are often treatable without requiring surgical revision. The most common long-term complication is meatal stenosis, this is almost exclusively seen in circumcised children, it is thought to be caused by ammonia producing bacteria coming into contact with the meatus in circumcised infants. It can be treated by meatotomy.

Effective pain management should be used during the procedure. Inadequate pain relief may carry the risks of heightened pain response for newborns. Newborns that experience pain due to being circumcised have different responses to vaccines given afterwards, with higher pain scores observed. For adult men who have been circumcised, there is a risk that the circumcision scar may be tender. There is no good evidence that circumcision affects cognitive abilities.

== History ==
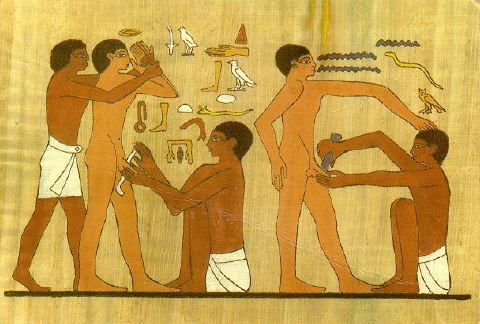
Adult circumcision scene from the tomb of Ankhmahor, Saqqara, Egypt (c. 2345–2333 BCE). Oldest known depiction of circumcision.

The word circumcision is from Latin circumcidere, meaning "to cut around". Depictions of circumcised penises are found in Paleolithic art, predating the earliest signs of trepanation.

The history of the migration and evolution of circumcision is known mainly from the cultures of two regions. In the lands south and east of the Mediterranean, starting with Central Sahara, Sudan and Ethiopia, the procedure was practiced by the ancient Egyptians and the Semites, and then by the Jews and Muslims. In Oceania, circumcision is practiced by the Australian Aboriginals and Polynesians. There is also evidence that circumcision was practiced among the Aztec and Mayan civilizations in the Americas, but little is known about that history.

It has been speculated that circumcision originated as a substitute for castration of defeated enemies or as a religious sacrifice. In many traditions, it acts as a rite of passage marking a boy's entrance into adulthood.

=== Middle East, Africa and Europe ===
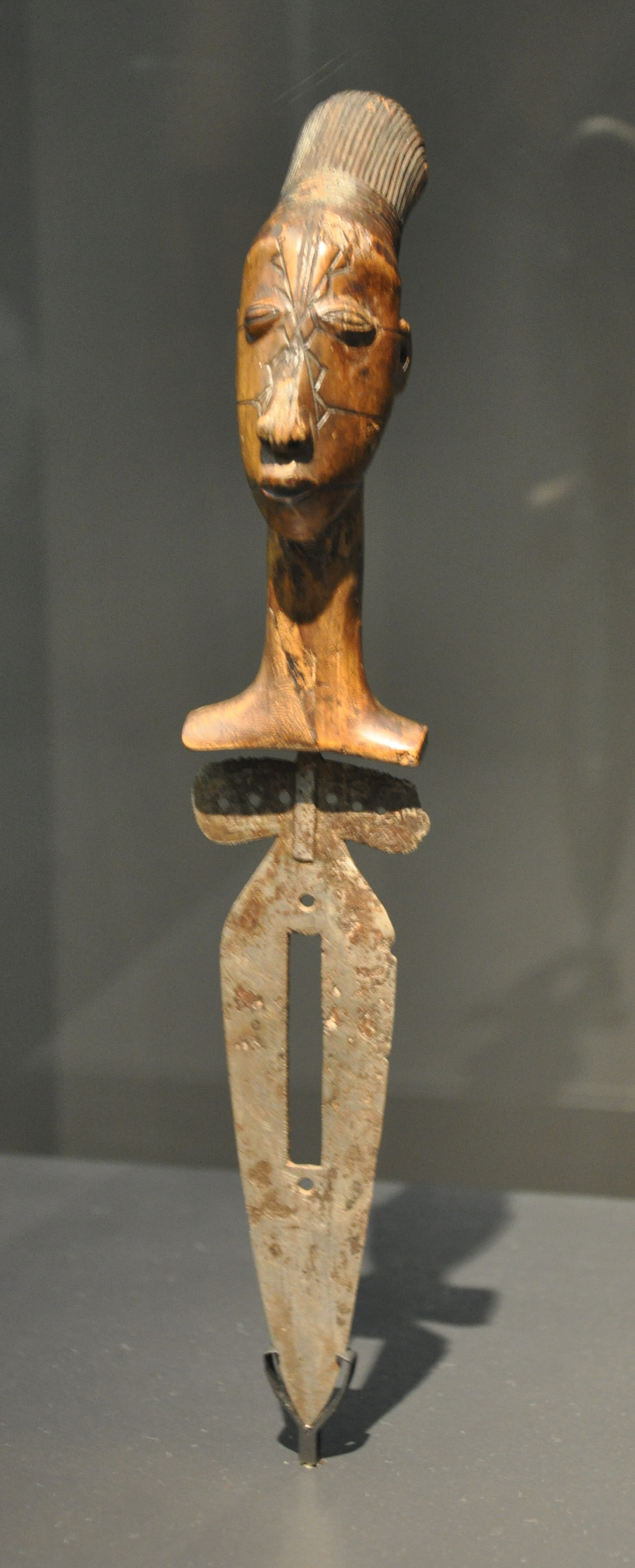
Circumcision knife from the Congo; wood, iron; late 19th/early 20th century

At Oued Djerat, in Algeria, engraved rock art with masked bowmen, which feature male circumcision and may be a scene involving ritual, have been dated to earlier than 6000 BP amid the Bubaline Period; more specifically, while possibly dating much earlier than 10,000 BP, rock art walls from the Bubaline Period have been dated between 9200 BP and 5500 BP. The cultural practice of circumcision may have spread from the Central Sahara, toward the south in Sub-Saharan Africa and toward the east in the region of the Nile. Based on engraved evidence found on walls and evidence from mummies, circumcision has been dated to at least as early as 6000 BCE in ancient Egypt. Some ancient Egyptian mummies, which have been dated as early as 4000 BCE, show evidence of circumcision.

Evidence suggests that circumcision was practiced in the Middle East by the fourth millennium BCE, when the Sumerians and the Semites moved into the area that is modern-day Iraq from the North and West. The earliest historical record of circumcision comes from Egypt, in the form of an image of the circumcision of an adult carved into the tomb of Ankh-Mahor at Saqqara, dating to about 2400–2300 BCE. Circumcision was possibly done by the Egyptians for hygienic reasons, but also was part of their obsession with purity and was associated with spiritual and intellectual development. No well-accepted theory explains the significance of circumcision to the Egyptians, but it appears to have been endowed with great honor and importance as a rite of passage, performed in a public ceremony emphasizing the continuation of family generations and fertility. It may have been a mark of distinction for the elite: the Egyptian Book of the Dead describes the sun god Ra as having circumcised himself.

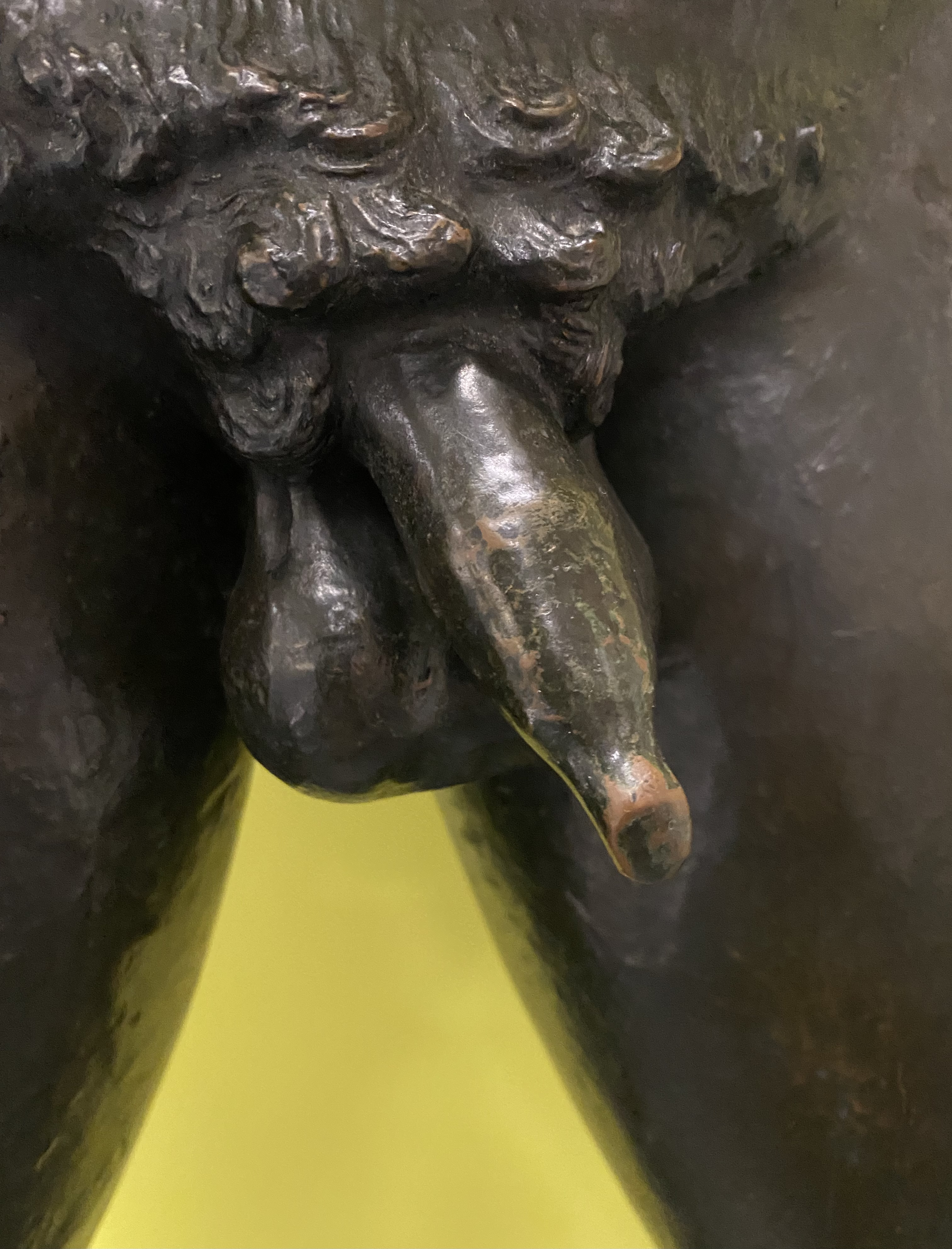
Detail of the Artemision Bronze; the Greeks abhorred circumcision, making life difficult for circumcised Jews living among the Greeks.

Circumcision is prominent in the Hebrew Bible. In addition to proposing that circumcision was adopted by the Israelites purely as a religious mandate, scholars have suggested that Judaism's patriarchs and their followers adopted circumcision to make penile hygiene easier in hot, sandy climates; as a rite of passage into adulthood; or as a form of blood sacrifice.

Historical campaigns of ethnic, cultural, and religious persecution frequently included bans on circumcision as a means of forceful assimilation, conversion, and ethnocide. Alexander the Great conquered the Middle East in the fourth century BCE, and in the following centuries ancient Greek cultures and values came to the Middle East. The Greeks abhorred circumcision, making life for circumcised Jews living among the Greeks and later the Romans very difficult. Restrictions on the Jewish practice by European governments have occurred several times in world history, including the Seleucid Empire under Antiochus IV and the Roman Empire under Hadrian, where it was used as a means of forceful assimilation and conversion. Antiochus IV's restriction on Jewish circumcision was a major factor in the Maccabean Revolt. Hadrian's prohibition has also been considered by some to have been a contributing cause of the Bar Kokhba revolt. According to Silverman (2006), these restrictions were part of a "broad campaign" by the Romans to "civilize" the Jewish people, viewing the practice as repulsive and analogous to castration. His successor, Antoninus Pius, altered the edict to permit Brit Milah. During this period in history, Jewish circumcision called for the removal of only a part of the prepuce, and Hellenized Jews often attempted to look uncircumcised and potentially restore their foreskins by stretching the extant parts of their foreskins with a specialized device called a pondus Judaeus. This was considered by the Jewish leaders to be a serious problem, and during the second century CE they changed the requirements of Jewish circumcision to call for the complete removal of the foreskin, emphasizing the Jewish view of circumcision as intended to be not just the fulfillment of a Biblical commandment but also an essential and permanent mark of membership in a people.

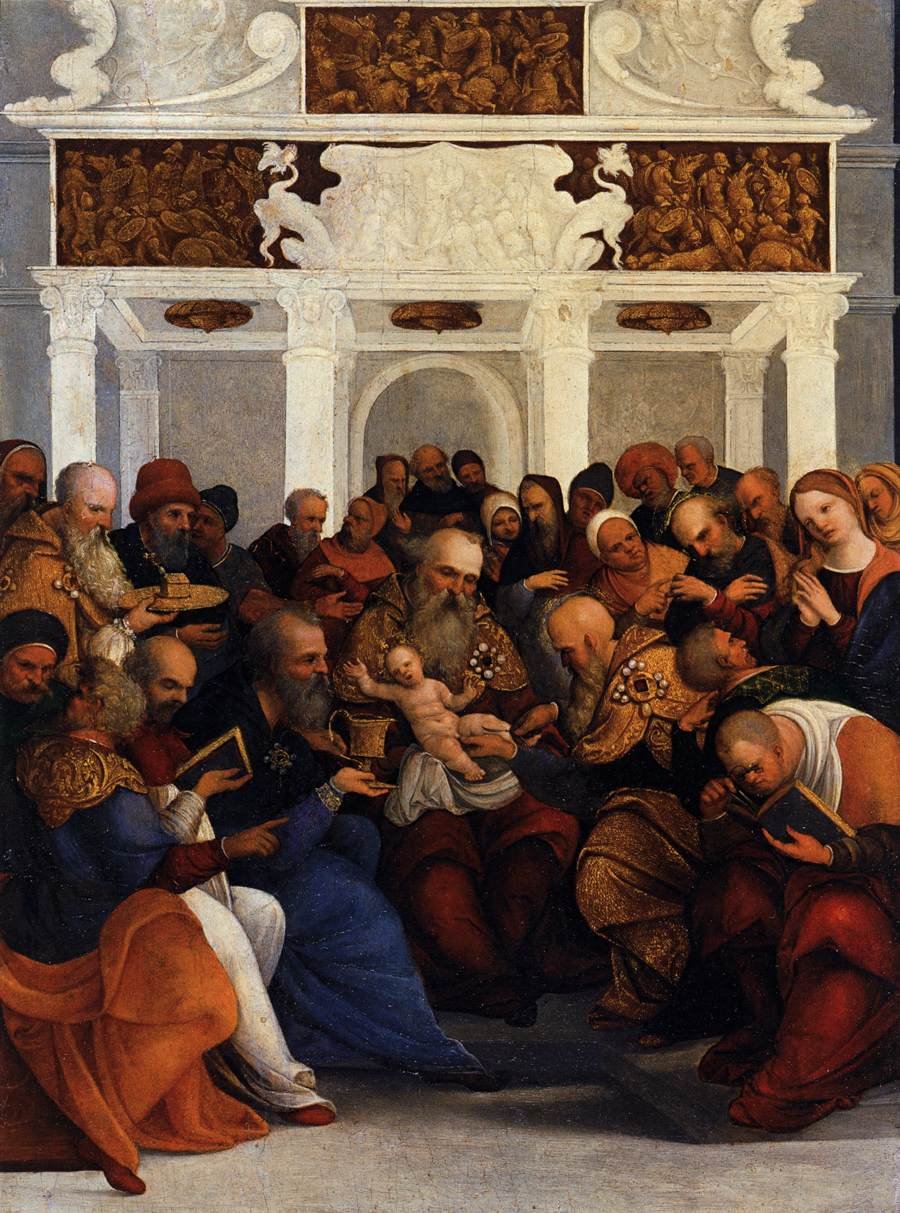
The Circumcision of Jesus Christ, by Ludovico Mazzolino

A narrative in the Christian Gospel of Luke makes a brief mention of the circumcision of Jesus, but physical circumcision is not part of the received teachings of Jesus. Circumcision has played an important role in Christian history and theology. Paul the Apostle reinterpreted circumcision as a spiritual concept, arguing literal circumcision to be unnecessary for Gentile converts to Christianity. The teaching that circumcision was unnecessary for membership in a divine covenant was instrumental to the separation of Christianity from Judaism. While the circumcision of Jesus is celebrated as a feast day in the liturgical calendar of many Christian denominations.

Although it is not explicitly mentioned in the Quran (early seventh century CE), circumcision is considered essential to Islam, and it is nearly universally performed among Muslims. The practice of circumcision spread across the Middle East, North Africa, and Southern Europe with Islam.

Genghis Khan and the following Yuan Emperors in China forbade Islamic practices such as halal butchering and circumcision.

The practice of circumcision is thought to have been brought to the Bantu-speaking tribes of Africa by either the Jews after one of their many expulsions from European countries, or by Muslim Moors escaping after the 1492 reconquest of Spain. In the second half of the first millennium CE, inhabitants from the Northeast of Africa moved south and encountered groups from Arabia, the Middle East, and West Africa. These people moved south and formed what is known today as the Bantu. Bantu tribes were observed to be upholding what was described as Jewish law, including circumcision, in the 16th century. Circumcision and elements of Jewish dietary restrictions are still found among Bantu tribes.

=== Indigenous peoples of the Americas and Oceania ===
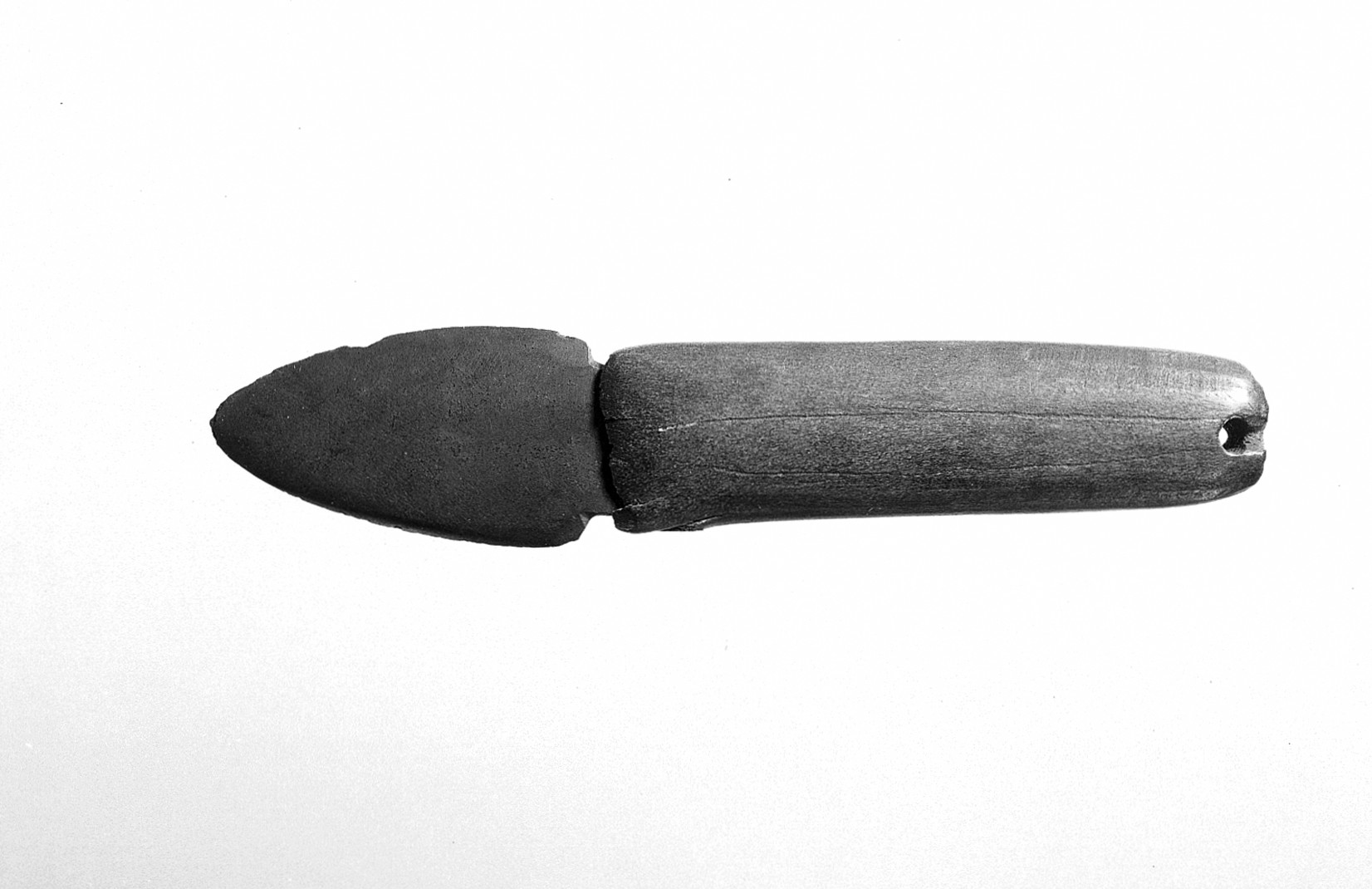
Slate blade circumcision knife with bone handle, North America. Wellcome Collection .

Circumcision is practiced by some groups amongst Australian Aboriginal peoples, Polynesians, and Native Americans.

For Aboriginal Australians and Polynesians, circumcision likely started as a blood sacrifice and a test of bravery and became an initiation rite with attendant instruction in manhood in more recent centuries. Often seashells were used to remove the foreskin, and the bleeding was stopped with eucalyptus smoke.

Christopher Columbus reported circumcision being practiced by Native Americans. It probably started among South American tribes as a blood sacrifice or ritual to test bravery and endurance, and later evolved into a rite of initiation.

=== East and Southeast Asia ===
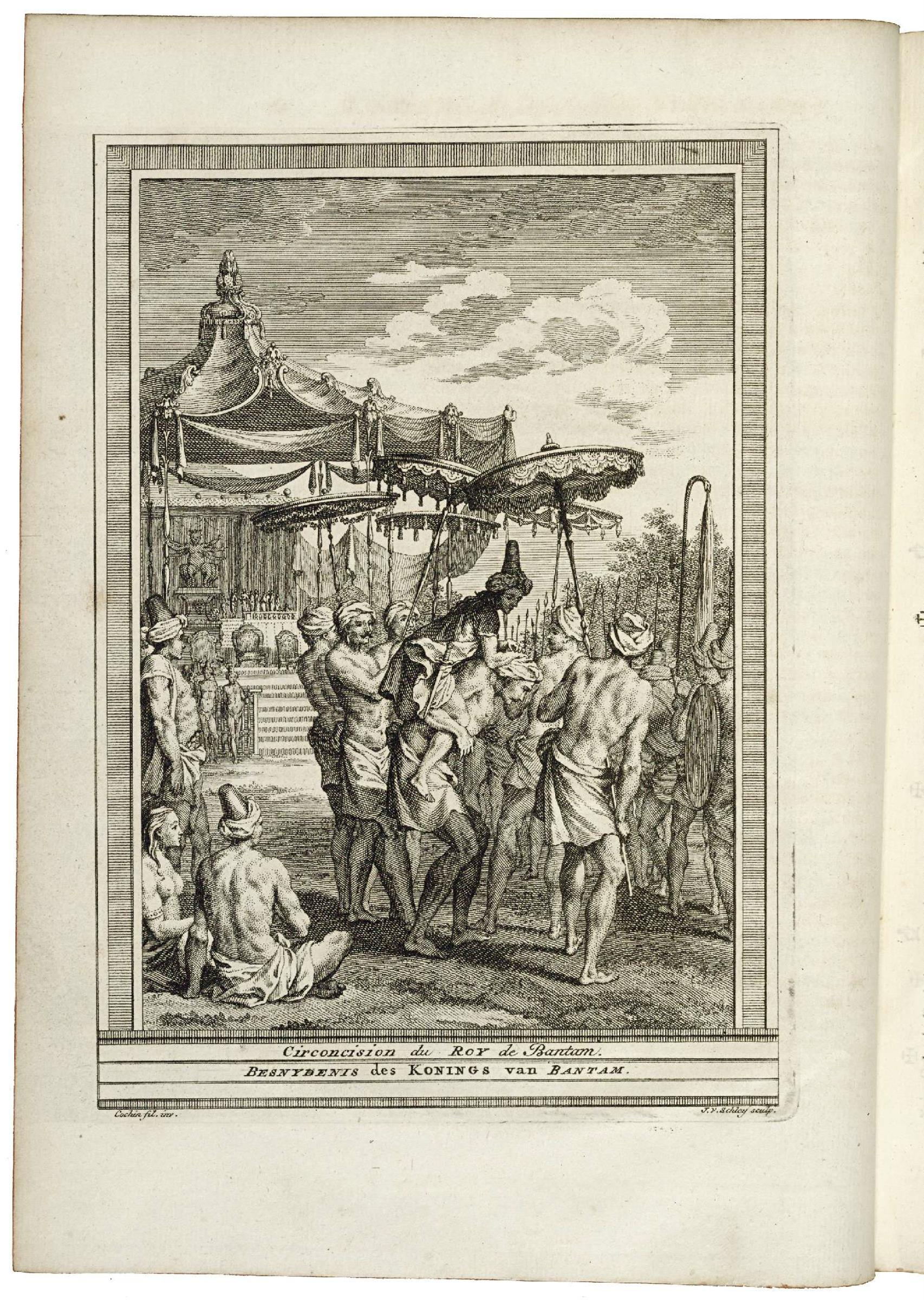
An 18th-century print depicting the circumcision of the king of Bantam (in present-day Indonesia). Engraving by Jakob van der Schley, published by Pieter de Hondt, 1747. Atlas of Mutual Heritage.

In Japan, the pre-Yamato indigenous inhabitants, the Ainu, practiced circumcision, though the practice did not persist among the broader Japanese population, possibly due to Buddhist influence.

In Southeast Asia, evidence suggests that indigenous forms of genital cutting predate the arrival of Islam. In the Indonesian archipelago, a traditional incision practice existed prior to Islamization; scholarly research has shown that this was progressively replaced by full circumcision following the adoption of Islam, a process accelerated in the late 19th century when Meccan jurists issued fatwas disapproving of the older local practice. In the Philippines, the traditional practice of tuli historically involved a dorsal slit rather than full circumcision, a form similar to practices among Pacific Islanders, suggesting an indigenous origin distinct from Islamic influence. The antiquity of circumcision in the region is further evidenced by the fact that Makassan traders from Sulawesi are recorded as having introduced circumcision to Aboriginal communities in Arnhem Land, Australia. With the spread of Islam across the archipelago from the 13th century onward, indigenous cutting practices were largely absorbed into or replaced by Islamic circumcision.

=== Prophylactic circumcision ===
==== Anglophonic adoption (1855–1918) ====
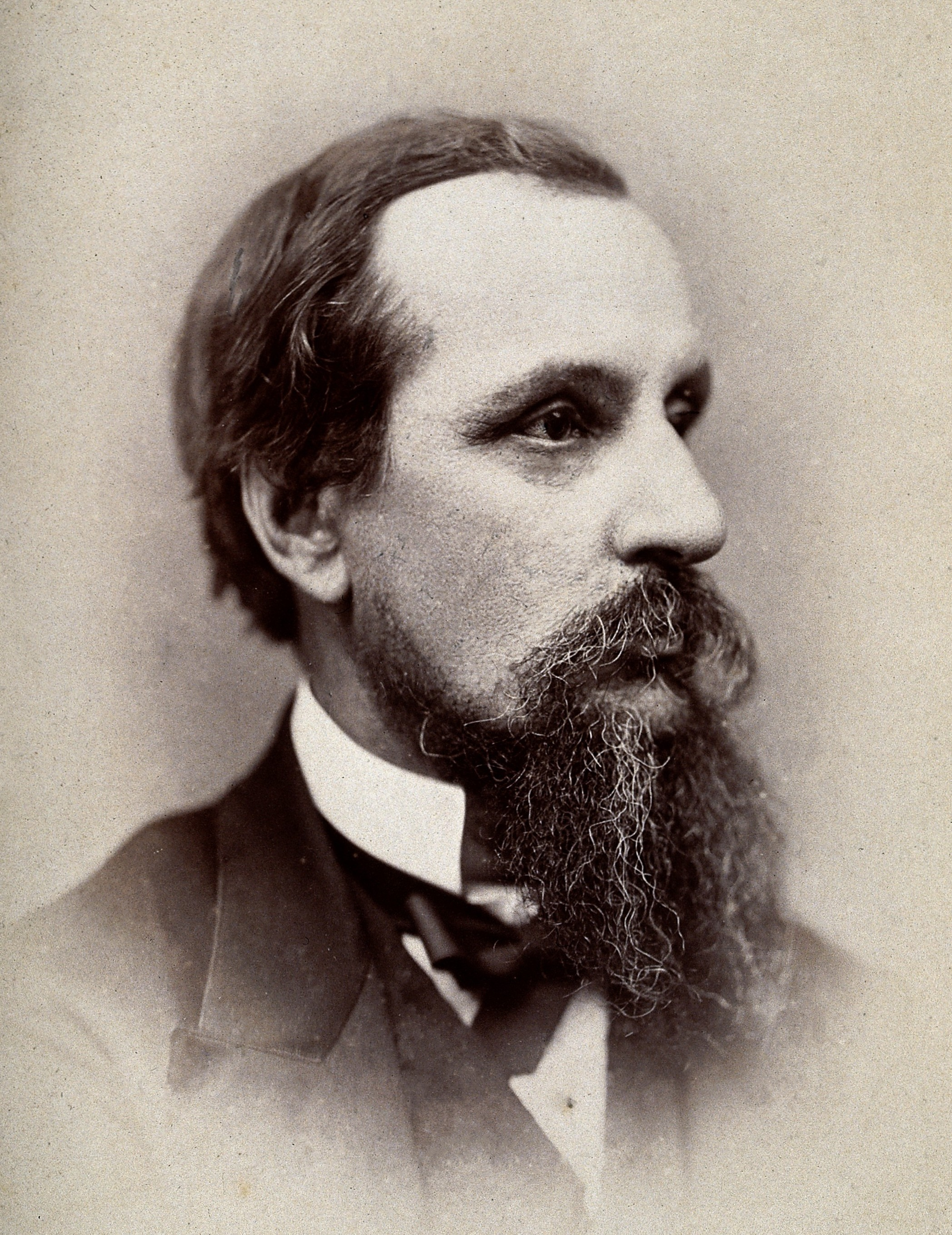
The first medical professional to recommend circumcision as a prophylaxis against disease was the British physician Jonathan Hutchinson in 1855. By the late 19th century, the belief that circumcision acted as an effective prophylactic against disease was held by a majority of the core Anglosphere's medical communities and doctors, such as the prominent Lewis Sayre, president of the American Medical Association, subsequently leading to its widespread adoption.

Circumcision began to be advocated as a means of prophylaxis in 1855, primarily as a means of preventing the transmission of sexually transmitted infections. At this time, British physician Jonathan Hutchinson published his findings that, among his venereal disease patients, Jews had a lower prevalence of syphilis. Hutchinson suggested that circumcision lowers the risk of contracting syphilis. He also believed that circumcision would prevent masturbation. In an 1893 article, On circumcision as a preventive of masturbation he wrote: "I am inclined to believe that [circumcision] may often accomplish much, both in breaking the habit [of masturbation] as an immediate result, and in diminishing the temptation to it subsequently." Pursuing a successful career as a general practitioner, Hutchinson went on to advocate circumcision for the next fifty years, eventually earned a knighthood for his contributions to medicine. His viewpoint that circumcision was prophylactic against disease was adopted by other medical professionals.

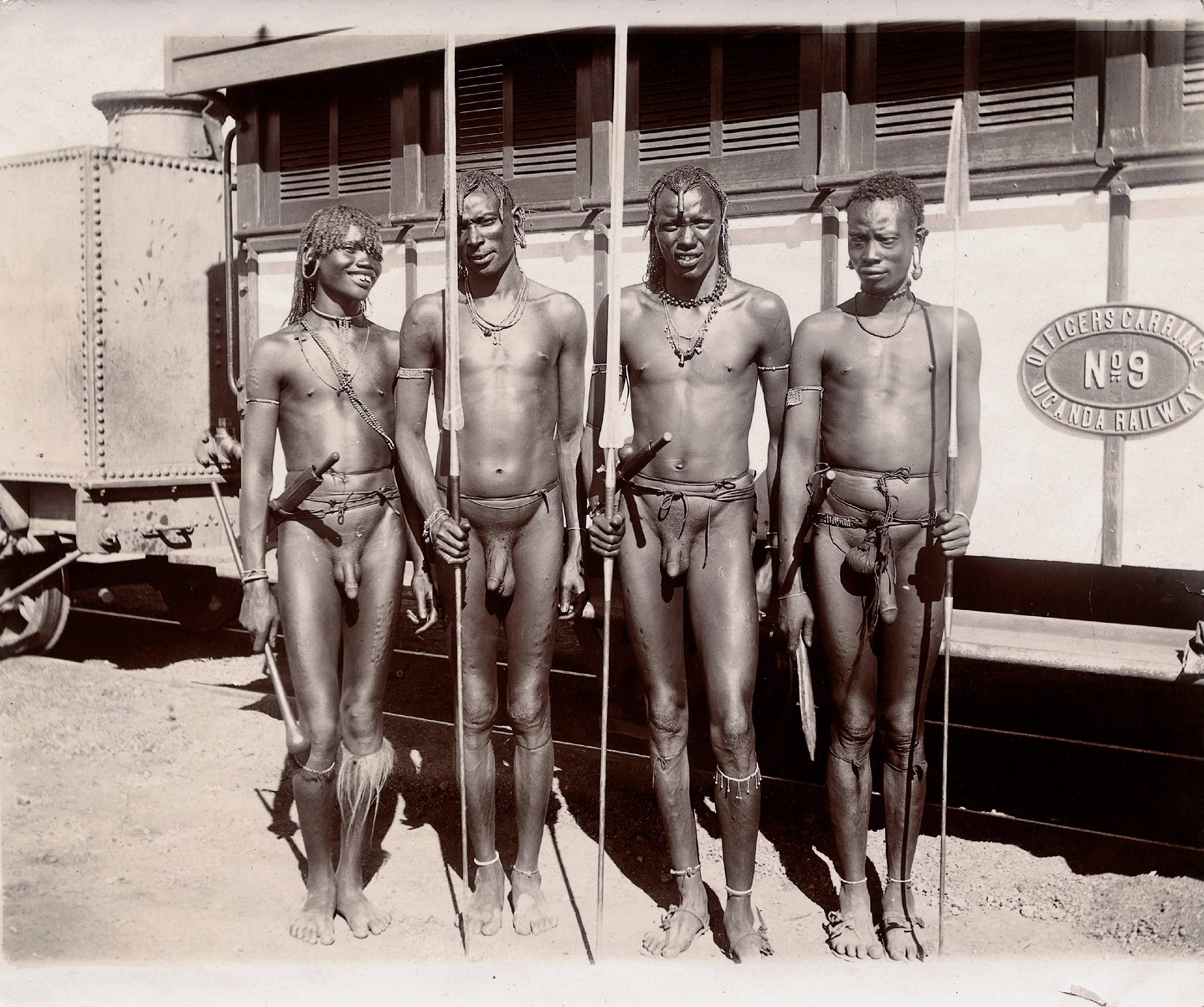
Four circumcised young Maasai tribesmen, circa 1900

In 1870, orthopedic surgeon Lewis Sayre, a founder of the American Medical Association, introduced circumcision in the United States as a purported cure for several cases of young boys presenting with paralysis and other significant gross motor problems. He thought the procedure ameliorated such problems based on the then prominent "reflex neurosis" theory of disease, thinking that a tight foreskin inflamed the nerves and caused systemic problems. The use of circumcision to promote good health also fit the germ theory of disease, which saw validation during the same period: the foreskin was thought to harbor infection-causing smegma. Sayre published works on the subject and promoted it in speeches. Many contemporary physicians also believed it could cure, reduce, or otherwise prevent a wide-ranging array of perceived medical problems and social ills. Its popularity spread with publications such as Peter Charles Remondino's History of Circumcision. By the late 19th century, circumcision had become common throughout the Anglophonic world—Australia, Canada, the United States, and the United Kingdom—as well as the Union of South Africa. In the United Kingdom and United States, it was universally recommended.

==== Interwar period and World War II (1918–1945) ====
During the interwar period, medical organizations and doctors in mainland Europe experimented with the idea of routine circumcision for prophylactic reasons as well, alongside developments in the Anglophonic world. In France, the medical profession went so far as to recommend universal routine circumcision. However, prevalence in France and mainland Europe remained low. There is a lack of consensus in the academic literature on why this occurred.

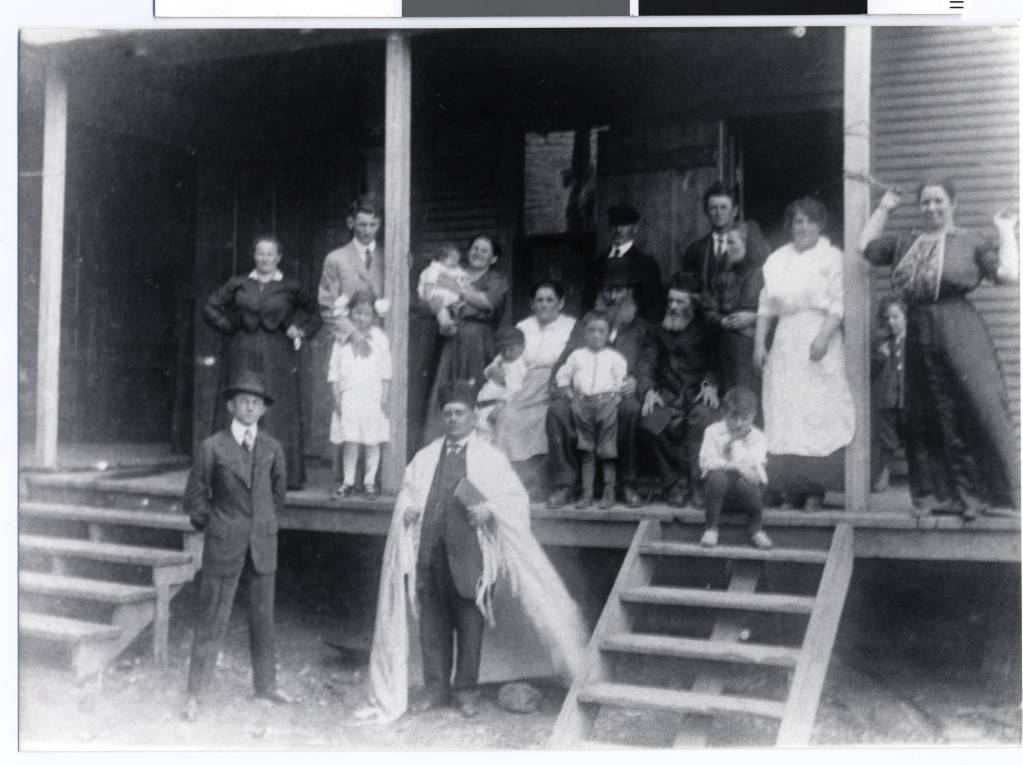
The Cohen family gathered to celebrate a Brit Milah in Eveleth, Minnesota, United States, 1908. The mohel wears a tallit and kippah.

Yosha & Bolnick & Koyle (2012) have suggested that a factor in its Anglophonic adoption and dismissal in mainland Europe relates to attitudes towards Judaism and Jewish practices. While many of these Anglophonic polities would not be considered tolerant by modern standards: the United Kingdom had Benjamin Disraeli—a Jew—as Prime Minister; Jews in the United States were prominent and generally well-respected; while in Australia "the racial issues of the time involved primarily Aborigines and Chinese immigration, and Jews were essentially below the radar". They argue that once "a substantial proportion of the male population [was] circumcised, the idea that it [was] a Jewish practice [became] no longer relevant. In Britain this was aided by the fact that circumcision was well known to be as much a practice of the nobility as a Jewish religious rite, so that the racial-religious nexus was broken." These factors were absent in continental Europe.

Rates in the Anglophonic world began to sharply diverge after 1945.

==== Mid-20th century (1945–1985) ====
After the end of World War II, Britain implemented a National Health Service. Douglas Gairdner's 1949 article "The Fate of the Foreskin" argued that the evidence showed that the risks outweighed the benefits, leading to a significant reduction in circumcision incidence within the United Kingdom.

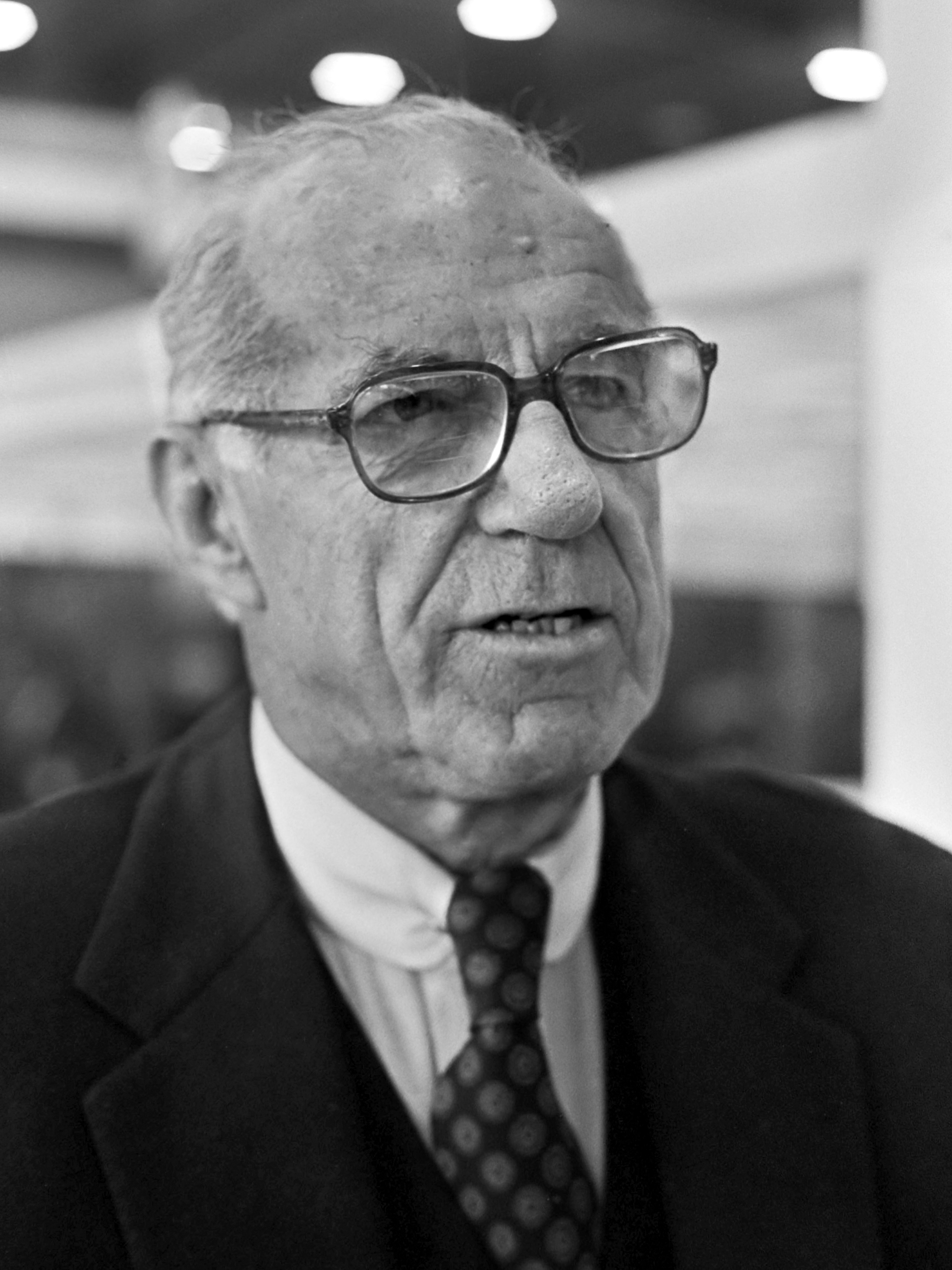
Pediatrician and political activist Benjamin Spock originally recommended circumcision in his influential work The Common Sense Book of Baby and Child Care, one of the best-selling books of the twentieth century.

In contrast to Gairdner, American pediatrician Benjamin Spock argued in favor of circumcision in his popular The Common Sense Book of Baby and Child Care which led to rates in the United States significantly rising. In the 1970s, national medical associations in Australia and Canada issued recommendations against routine infant circumcision, leading to drops in the rates of both of those countries. The United States made similar statements in the 1970s but stopped short of recommending against it.

During the same period, South Korea underwent one of the most rapid and distinctive shifts in circumcision practice recorded anywhere in the world. Throughout their long history, Koreans did not circumcise males until 1945, when Korea gained its independence after 36 years of Japanese occupation. Independence brought trusteeship by the American military in the southern half of the country, and 1950 can be safely regarded as the year when widescale circumcision started in South Korea.

==== Modernity (since 1985) ====
An association between circumcision and reduced heterosexual HIV infection rates was first suggested in 1986.

Experimental evidence was needed to establish a causal relationship, so three randomized controlled trials were commissioned to exclude other confounding factors. Trials took place in South Africa, Kenya and Uganda. All three trials were stopped early by their monitoring boards because those in the circumcised group had a substantially lower rate of HIV contraction than the control group, so it was considered unethical to withhold the procedure, in light of strong evidence of prophylactic efficacy. WHO assessed these as "gold standard" studies and found "strong and consistent" evidence from later studies that confirmed the results of the studies. A scientific consensus subsequently developed that circumcision reduces heterosexual HIV infection rates in high-risk populations; the WHO, along with other major medical organizations, have since promoted circumcision of high-risk populations as part of the program to reduce the spread of HIV. The Male Circumcision Clearinghouse website was created in 2009 by WHO, UNAIDS, FHI and AVAC to provide evidence-based guidance, information, and resources to support the delivery of safe male circumcision services in countries that choose to scale up the procedure as one component of comprehensive HIV prevention services.

== Society and culture ==
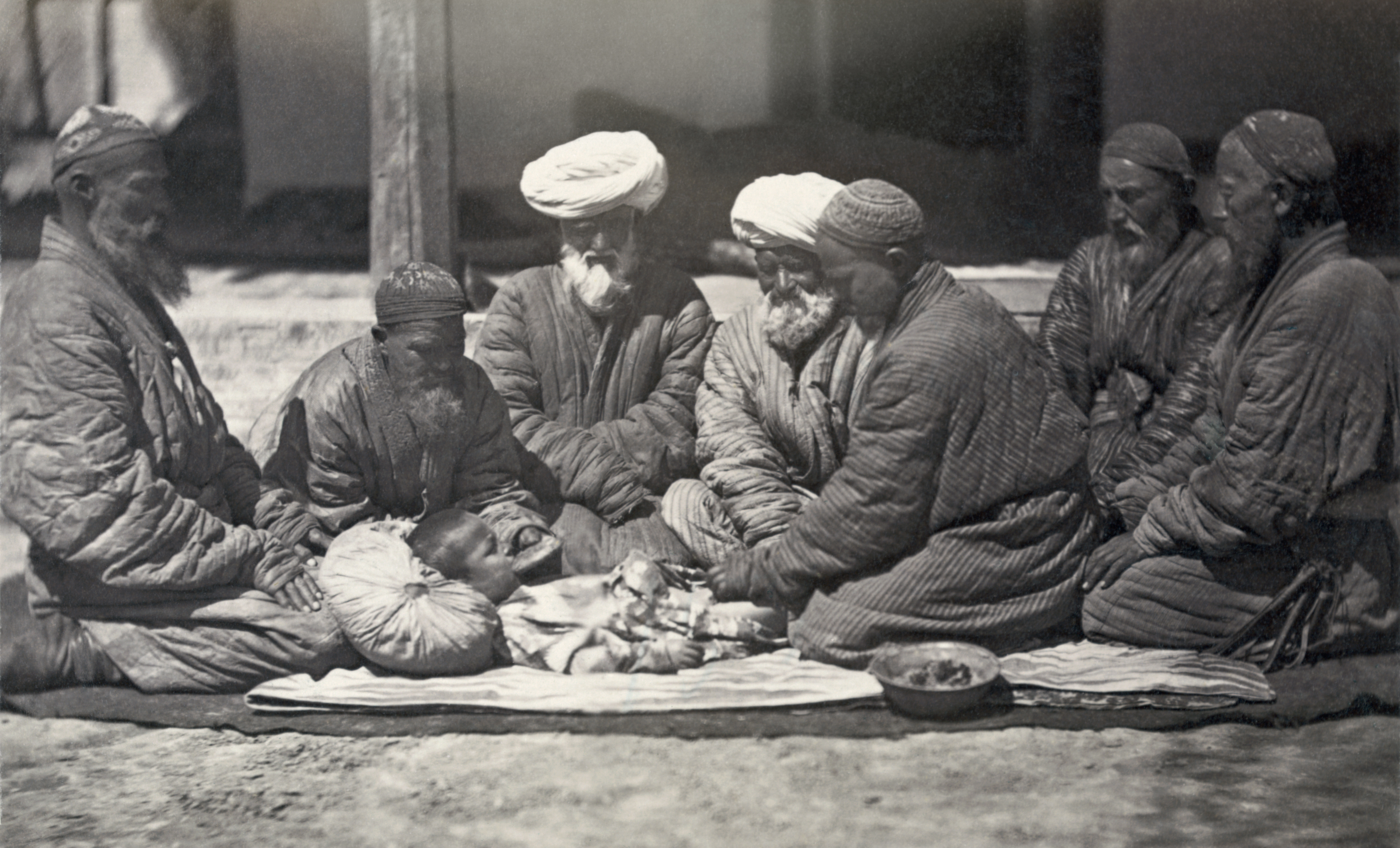
A circumcision being performed in Central Asia, c. 1865–1872

Circumcision is one of the oldest surgical procedures in human history, and remains a highly emotional and controversial issue. Many societies hold a wide-ranging perspectives and different cultural, ethical, or social views on circumcision. In some cultures, males are generally required to be circumcised shortly after birth, during childhood or around puberty as part of a rite of passage.

=== Religious views on circumcision ===
Circumcision is commonly practiced in the Jewish, Islamic, and Druze faiths, and among the members of Coptic Church, the Ethiopian Orthodox Church and the Eritrean Orthodox Tewahedo Church. In contrast, other religions, such as Mandaeism, Hinduism and Sikhism, strongly prohibit the practice of routine circumcision.

==== Judaism ====
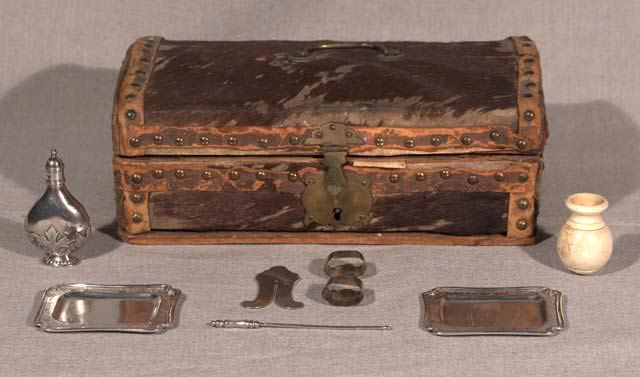
Circumcision set and trunk belonging to Gershom Mendes Seixas's family, ca. eighteenth century

Circumcision is near-universal among Jews. The mitzvah of circumcision on the eighth day of life is considered among the most important commandments in Judaism. Barring extraordinary circumstances, failure to undergo the rite is seen by followers of Judaism as leading to a state of Kareth: the extinction of the soul and denial of a share in the world to come. Reasons for biblical circumcision include to show off "patrilineal descent, sexual fertility, male initiation, cleansing of birth impurity, and dedication to God".

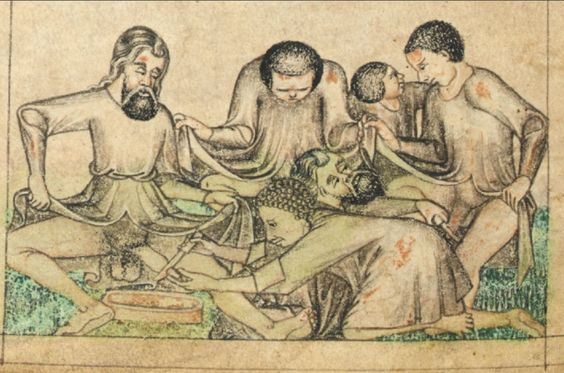
Abraham and Ishmael are circumcised. Egerton Genesis Picture Book (Egerton MS., 1894), fol. 9v. Norfolk, England, c. 1375. The British Library, London.

The basis for its observance is found in the Torah of the Hebrew Bible, in Genesis chapter 17, in which a covenant of circumcision is made with Abraham and his descendants. God states circumcision is "a sign of the covenant between me and you". Jewish circumcision is part of the brit milah ritual, to be performed by a trained ritual circumciser, a mohel, on the eighth day of a newborn son's life, with certain exceptions for poor health. Jewish law requires that circumcision leaves the glans bare when the penis is flaccid. Mainstream Judaism foresees serious negative spiritual consequences if it is neglected.

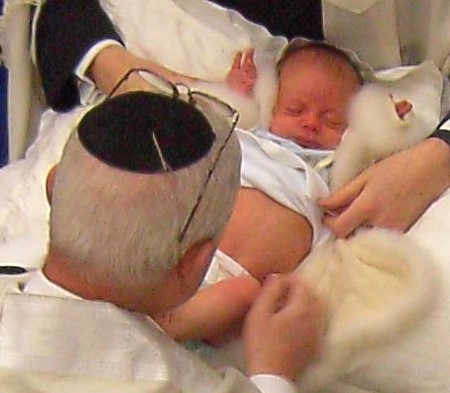
Preparing for a Jewish ritual circumcision

In Genesis 17:12-13, God also specifies that slaves must be circumcised, but Rabbinic Judaism condemns forced conversion, so gentiles are only required to be circumcised if they show genuine interest in joining the Jewish nation. If an improper circumcision has already been performed, it is required that a drop of blood be drawn as a symbolic circumcision. There are certain exceptions for those with poor health. The Reform and Reconstructionist movements generally do not require a circumcision as part of the conversion process.

According to traditional Jewish law, in the absence of an adult free Jewish male expert, a woman, a slave, or a child who has the required skills is also authorized to perform the circumcision, provided that they are Jewish. However, most streams of non-Orthodox Judaism allow female mohels, called mohalot (Hebrew: מוֹהֲלוֹת, the plural of מוֹהֶלֶת mohelet, feminine of mohel), without restriction. In 1984 Deborah Cohen became the first certified Reform mohelet; she was certified by the Berit Mila program of Reform Judaism. All major rabbinical organizations recommend that male infants should be circumcised. The issue of converts remains controversial in Reform and Reconstructionist Judaism.

Brit shalom (Hebrew: ברית שלום; "Covenant of Peace"), also called alternative brit to the practice of brit milah, is a naming ceremony for Jews that does not involve circumcision. The first known ceremony is said to have been celebrated around 1970 by Rabbi Sherwin Wine, the founder of the Society for Humanistic Judaism. Although increasingly many U.S. Jews have chosen not to circumcise their sons, a study by The Jewish Journal in the Greater Los Angeles area found brit shalom to be extremely rare.

==== Islam ====
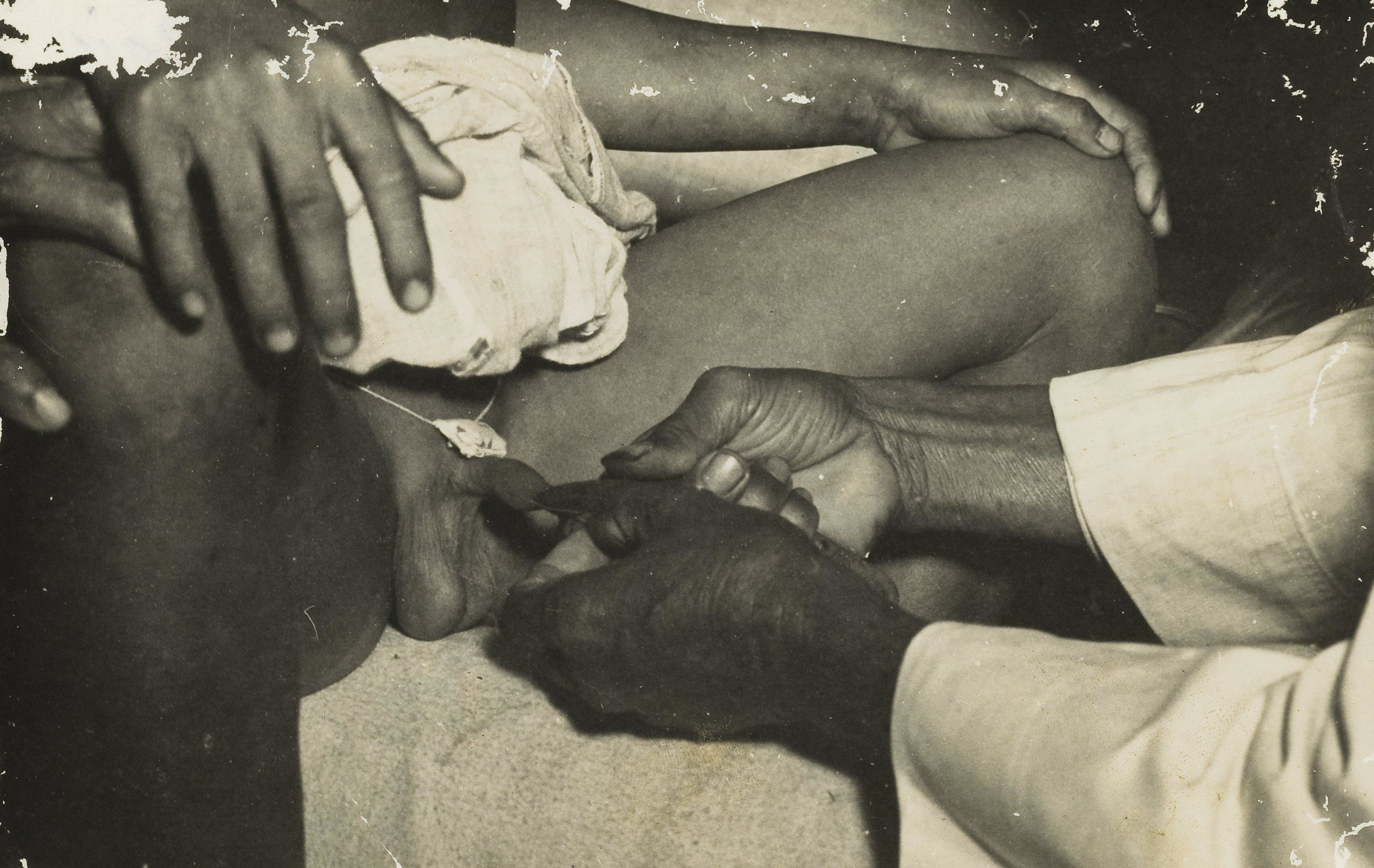
Khitan in the Dutch East Indies (present-day Indonesia), colonial era.

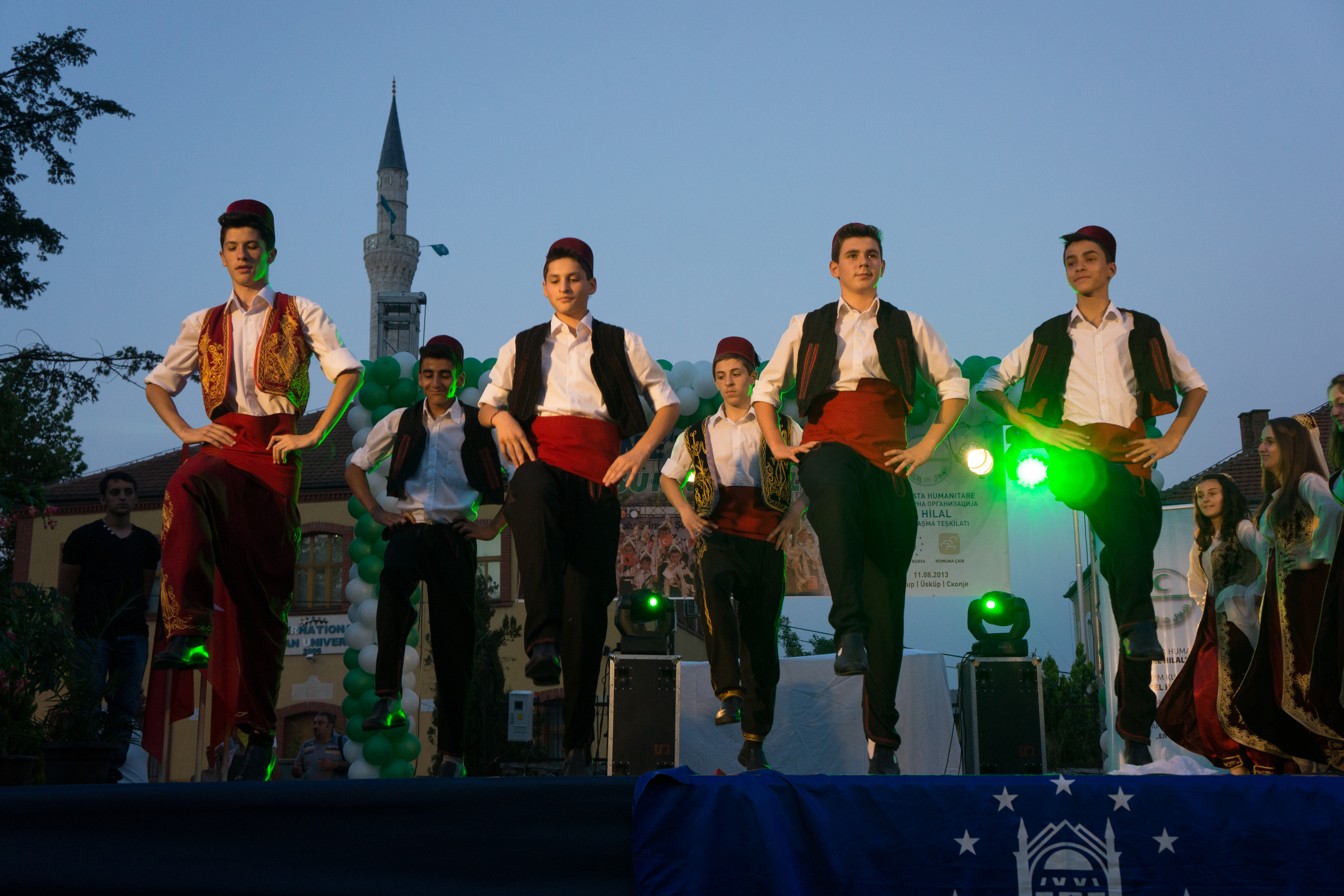
Circumcision celebration in Skopje, North Macedonia, 2013

Islamic scholars have diverse opinions on the obligatory nature of male circumcision, with some considering it mandatory (wājib), while others view it as only being recommended (sunnah). According to historians of religion and scholars of religious studies, the Islamic tradition of circumcision was derived from the Pagan practices and rituals of pre-Islamic Arabia. Although there is some debate within Islam over whether it is a religious requirement or mere recommendation, circumcision (called khitan) is practiced nearly universally by Muslim males. Islam bases its practice of circumcision on the Genesis 17 narrative, the same Biblical chapter referred to by Jews. The procedure is not explicitly mentioned in the Quran, however, it is a tradition established by Islam's prophet Muhammad directly (following Abraham), and so its practice is considered a sunnah (prophet's tradition) and is very important in Islam. For Muslims, circumcision is also a matter of cleanliness, purification and control over one's baser self (nafs).

There is no agreement across the many Islamic communities about the age at which circumcision should be performed. It may be done from soon after birth up to about age 15; most often it is performed at around six to seven years of age. The timing can correspond with the boy's completion of his recitation of the whole Quran, with a coming-of-age event such as taking on the responsibility of daily prayer or betrothal. Circumcision may be celebrated with an associated family or community event. Circumcision is recommended for, but is not required of, converts to Islam.

Quranists (less than 1% of all Muslims) reject hadith, and because circumcision is not mentioned in the Quran they do not consider it to be an Islamic practice.

==== Christianity ====
Traditionally, circumcision has not been practiced by Christians for religious reasons. The practice was viewed as succeeded by Baptism and the New Testament chapter Acts 15 recorded that Christianity did not require circumcision from new converts. Christian denominations generally hold a neutral position on circumcision for prophylactic, cultural, and social reasons, while strongly opposing it for religious reasons. This includes the Catholic Church, which explicitly banned the practice of religious circumcision in the Council of Florence, and maintains a neutral position on the practice of circumcision for other reasons. A majority of other Christian denominations take a similar position on circumcision, prohibiting it for religious observance, but neither explicitly supporting or forbidding it for other reasons.

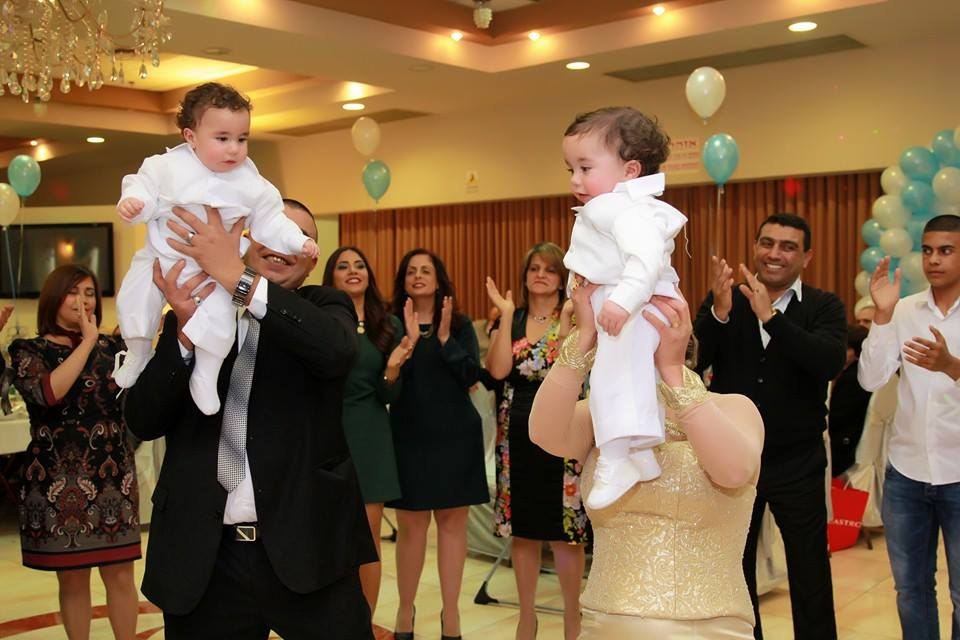
Coptic Children wearing traditional circumcision costumes

Thus, circumcision rates of Christians are predominately determined by the surrounding cultures which they live in. In some African and Eastern Christian denominations circumcision is an established practice, and generally boys undergo circumcision shortly after birth as part of a rite of passage. Circumcision is near-universal among Coptic Christians, and they practice circumcision as a rite of passage. Circumcision is near-universal among Orthodox men in Ethiopia. Eritrean Orthodox practice circumcision as a rite of passage, and they circumcise their sons "anywhere from the first week of life to the first few year". Some Christian churches in South Africa disapprove of the practice, while others require it of their members.

Circumcision is practiced in many predominantly Christian countries. Christian communities in Africa, some Anglosphere countries, the Philippines, the Middle East, South Korea and Oceania have high circumcision rates, while Christian communities in Europe and South America have low circumcision rates, although none of these are performed out of perceived religious obligation. Scholar Heather L. Armstrong writes that, as of 2021, about half of Christian males worldwide are circumcised, with most of them being located in Africa, Anglosphere countries, and the Philippines.

==== Druze faith ====
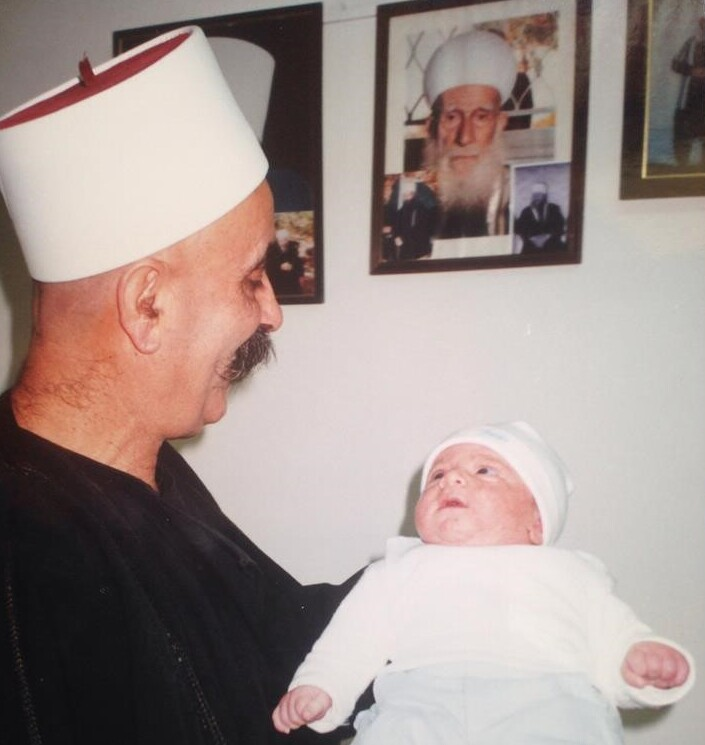
Preparing for a ritual circumcision to a Druze child

Circumcision is widely practiced by the Druze, who practice Druzism, an Abrahamic, monotheistic, syncretic, and ethnic religion. The procedure is a cultural tradition and has no religious significance in Druzism. There is no special date for it; male infants are usually circumcised shortly after birth, but some remain uncircumcised until age ten or older. Some Druze do not circumcise their male children and refuse to observe this "common Muslim practice".

==== Samaritanism ====
Like Judaism, the religion of Samaritanism requires ritual circumcision on the eighth day of life.

==== Mandaeism ====
Circumcision is forbidden in Mandaeism, and Mandaeans consider it abhorrent. According to Mandaean doctrine, a circumcised man cannot serve as a Mandaean priest.

==== Yazidism ====
Circumcision is not required in Yazidism, but is practised by some Yazidis due to regional customs. The ritual is usually performed soon after birth; it takes place on the knees of the kerîf (approximately "godfather"), with whom the child will have a lifelong formal relationship.

=== Indian religions ===
==== Hinduism ====
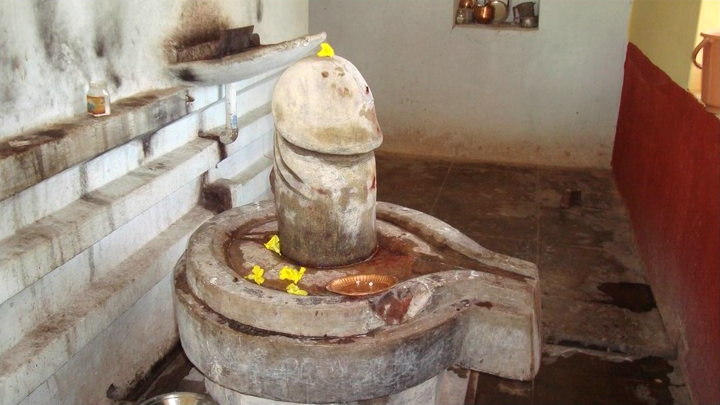
Sculptural representation of lingam, male sex organ-placed on yoni, female sex organ. In Hinduism, lingam and yoni represent the masculine and the feminine creative principles respectively.

In Hinduism, the Upanishads say that the nature of the higher self (Brahman), in essence, is bliss (ānanda), which the self in each being (Atman) experiences during dreamless deep sleep but remains unconscious of, consciously experiencing it during sensual activity. The Upanishads say that in humans, just as eyes correspond to the experience of sight, nose with smell, ears with sound, and tongue with taste, the genitals correspond to "bliss, delight and procreation". The Brihadaranyaka Upanishad says that in humans, genitals are the "single locus of pleasure (ānanda)". In Sanskrit literature, the penis is called Upastha ("that which stands up") and is traditionally considered a "source of great power or vitality (ojas)." In Yoga physiology, the penis corresponds with svadhishthana chakra, and channels the flow of nadis, which enable higher sensations and consciousness. Consequently, circumcision, or even an interference with a tight foreskin, is strictly forbidden in Hindu traditions.

==== Buddhism ====
Buddhism neither requires nor prohibits circumcision, and it contains no canonical injunction regarding circumcision; the Pali Vinaya, which governs monastic conduct in detail, makes no mention of the practice.

==== Sikhism ====
Sikhism does not require circumcision of its followers and strongly criticizes the practice. The Guru Granth Sahib criticizes circumcision in a hymn. The holy book of Sikhs, dating to 1708, bans circumcision as an Islamic custom, saying: "If God wished me to be a Muslim, it would be cut off by itself."

=== Cultural views on circumcision ===
==== African cultures ====
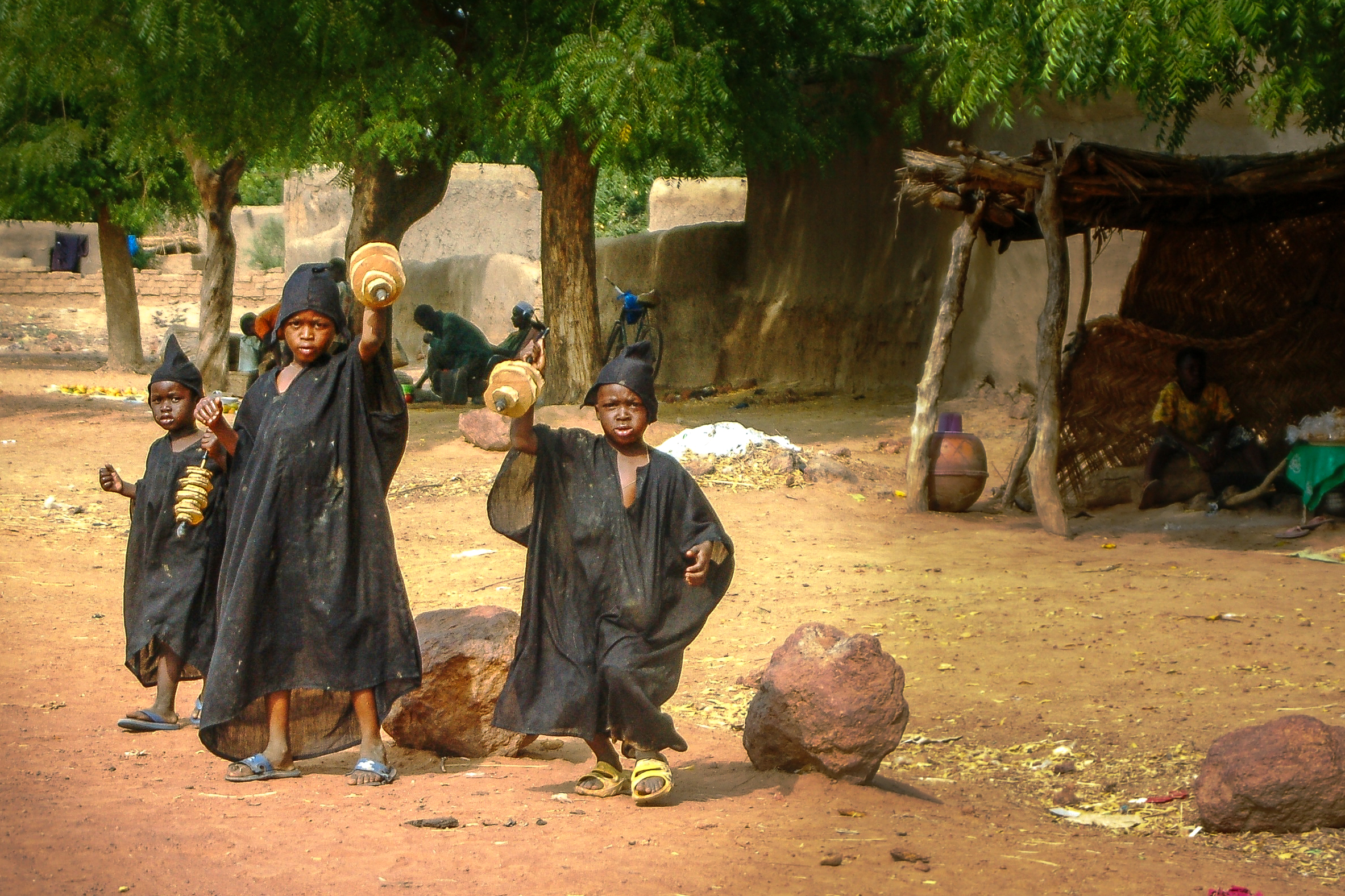
Freshly circumcised boys in Mali celebrating the event.

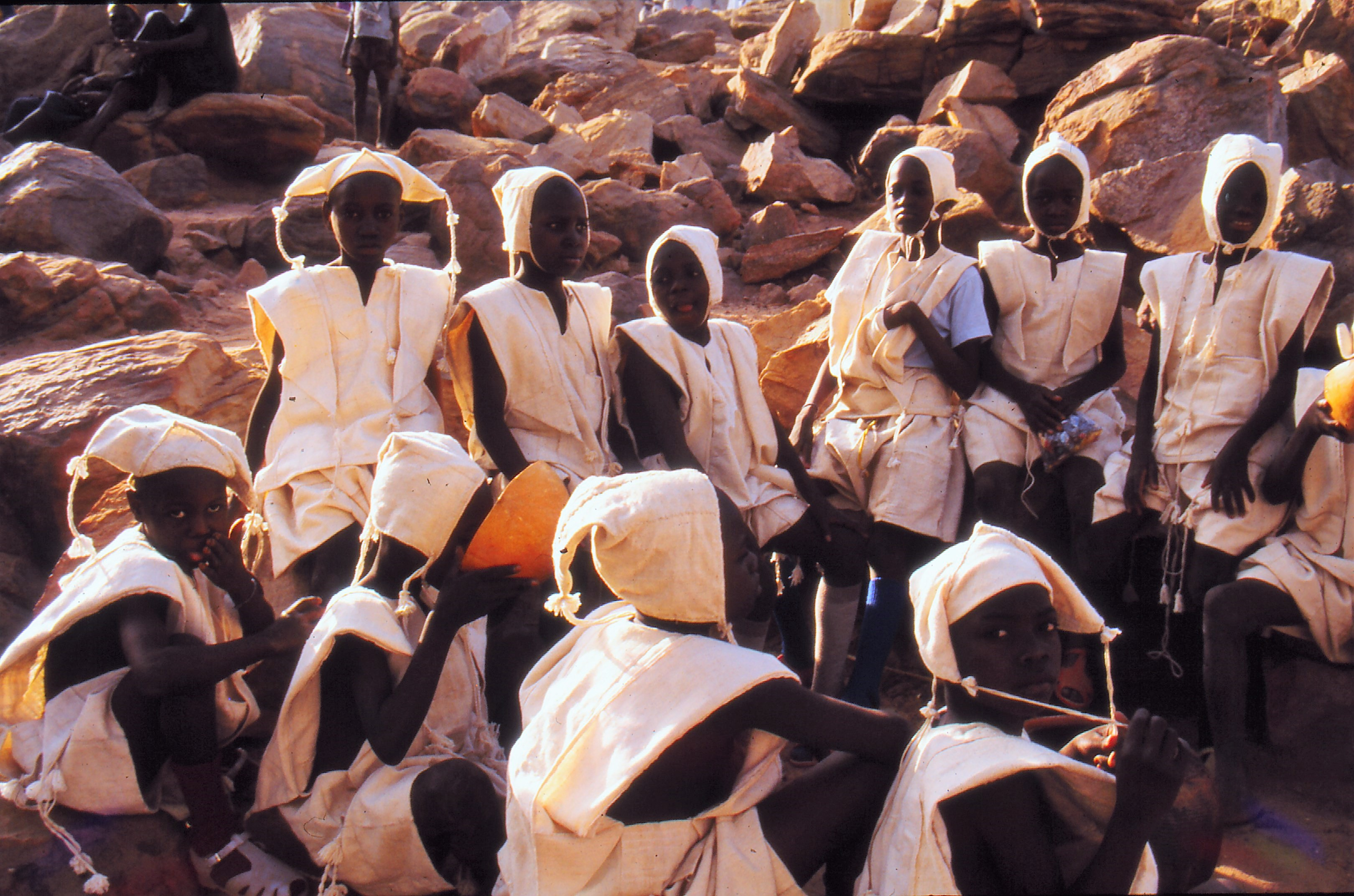
Boys in white clothing with bonnets at Tireli market, just after circumcision, Mali, 1990

Circumcision in Africa, and the rites of initiation in Africa, as well as "the frequent resemblance between details of ceremonial procedure in areas thousands of kilometres apart, indicate that the circumcision ritual has an old tradition behind it and in its present form is the result of a long process of development."

==== Australian cultures ====
Some Aboriginal Australian groups use circumcision as a test of bravery and self-control as a part of a rite of passage into manhood, which results in full societal and ceremonial membership. It may be accompanied by body scarification and the removal of teeth, and may be followed by penile subincision. Circumcision is one of many trials and ceremonies required before a youth is considered to have become knowledgeable enough to maintain and pass on the cultural traditions. During these trials, the maturing youth bonds in solidarity with the men. Circumcision is also strongly associated with a man's family, and it is part of the process required to prepare a man to take a wife and produce his own family.

==== Turkic cultures ====
Among Turkic peoples, circumcision (sünnet in Turkish, sünnət in Azerbaijani, sunnat in Uzbek, сүндет/sündet in Kazakh) is viewed as both a religious obligation and a significant rite of passage for boys. The practice is nearly universal among Turkic Muslim populations in Turkey, Azerbaijan, Uzbekistan, Kazakhstan, Kyrgyzstan, Turkmenistan, and among Turkic minorities such as the Uyghurs in China.

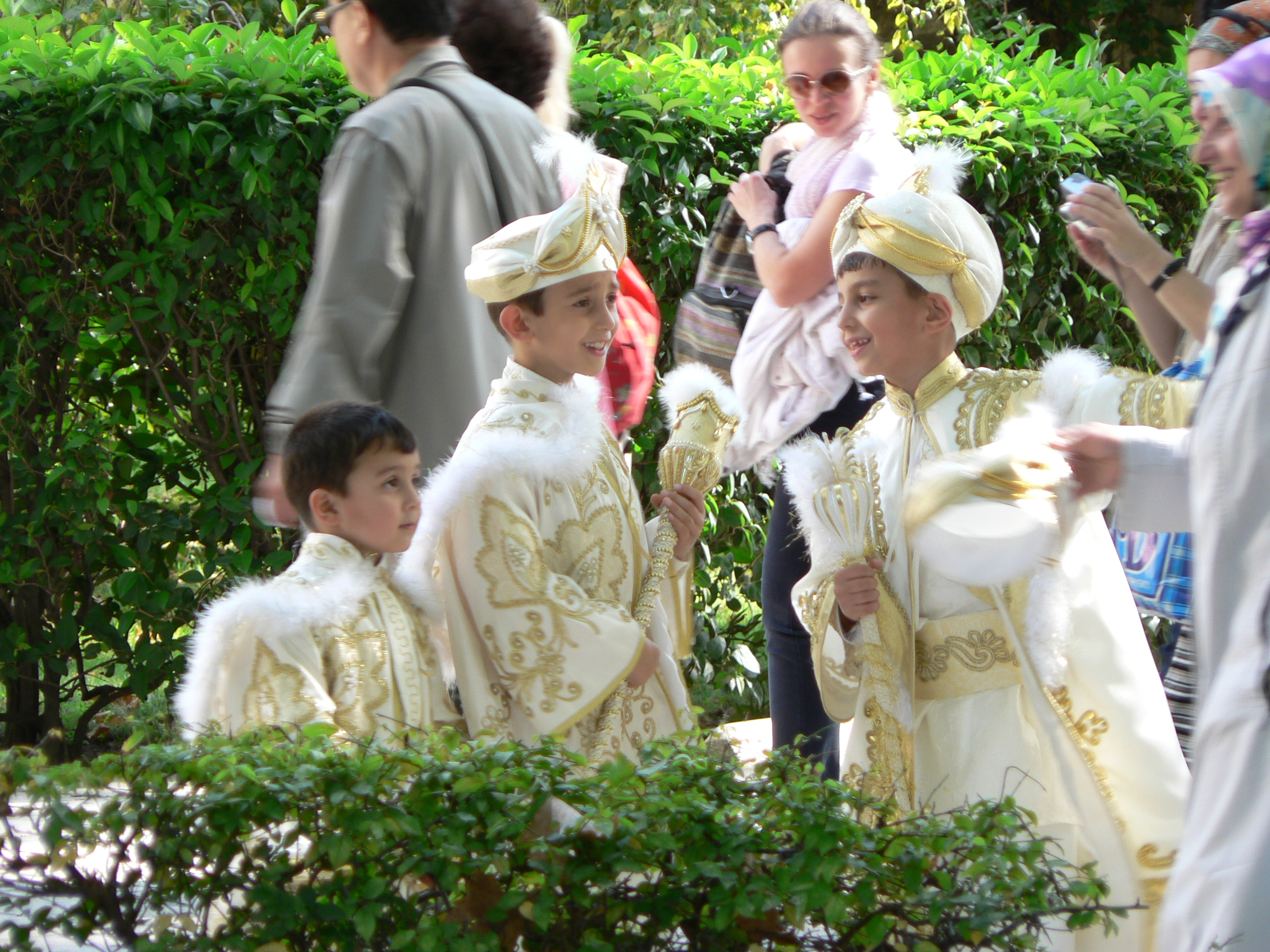
Children in Turkey wearing traditional circumcision costumes

The ceremony, known as sünnet düğünü (circumcision celebration) in Turkey, is typically one of the most important events in a boy's life, often rivaling weddings in scale and expense. Boys are usually circumcised between the ages of 2 and 14, with the timing varying by region and family preference. The celebration commonly includes the boy wearing special ceremonial attire, often resembling a prince's costume or military uniform, and parading through the community on horseback or in a decorated vehicle. Among the Uyghurs, the tradition is called xetne toyi and remains an important rite of passage. In traditional practice, the ceremony was accompanied by feasting, music, and gift-giving, serving as an important occasion for community bonding and the affirmation of cultural identity.

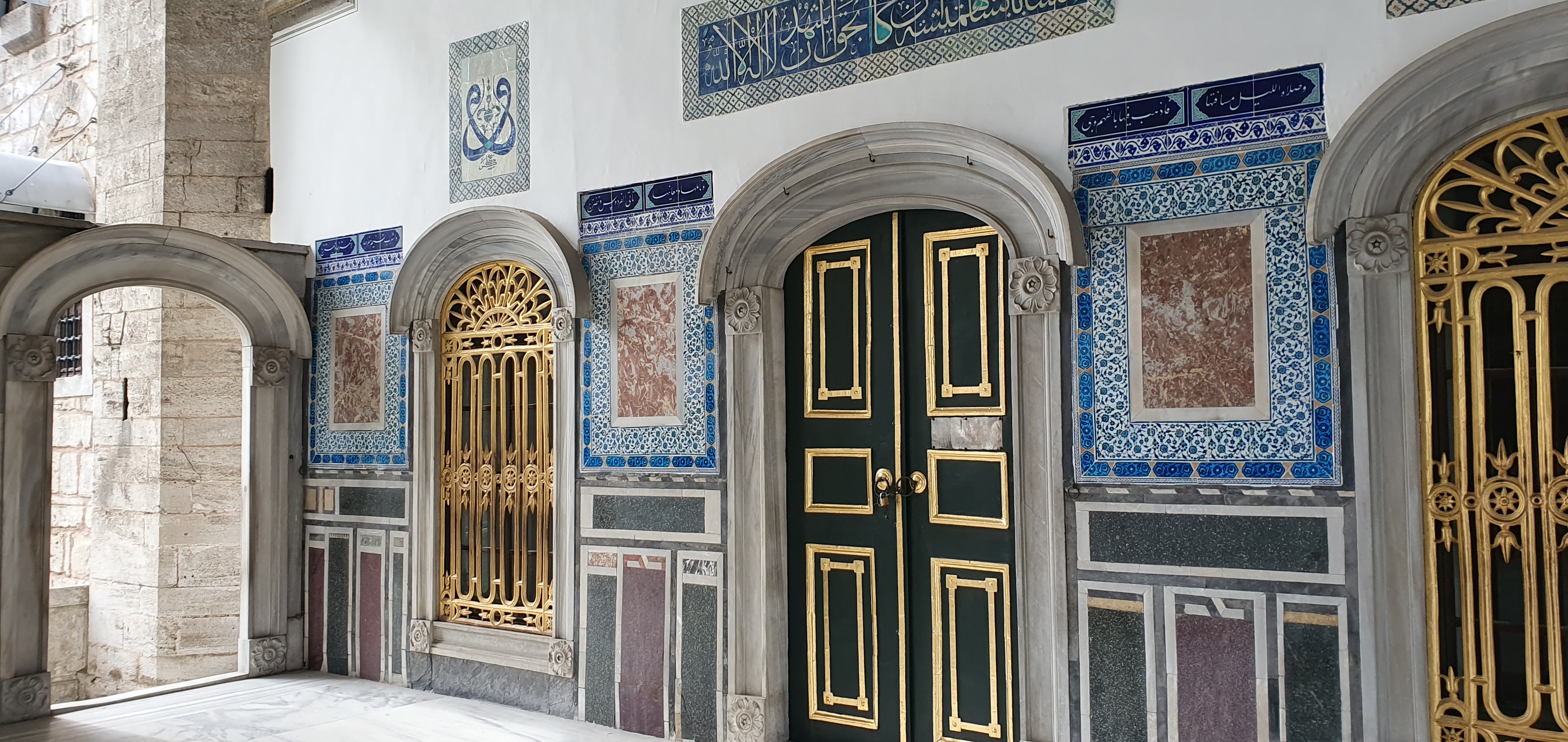
Exterior of the Circumcision Room in Topkapı Palace

==== Filipino culture ====
In the Philippines, circumcision is known as "tuli" and is generally viewed as a rite of passage. An overwhelming majority of Filipino men are circumcised. (Note: The most commonly-done procedure is in actuality not a circumcision but a dorsal slit, where no foreskin is actually removed. When the foreskin is removed, it is commonly known locally as a "German cut" in reference to the introduction of the modern surgical technique by the founder of plastic and reconstructive surgery, Johann Friedrich Dieffenbach.) Often this occurs in April and May, when Filipino boys are taken by their parents. The practice dates back to the arrival of Islam in 1450. Pressure to be circumcised is even in the language: one Tagalog profanity for "uncircumcised" is supot, meaning "coward". A circumcised eight- or ten-year-old is no longer considered a boy and is given more adult roles in the family and society.

=== Ethics ===
There is substantial disagreement amongst bioethicists and theologians over the practice of circumcision, with many believing that the routine circumcision of neonates for health purposes is a cost-ineffective and ethically-problematic intervention in developed countries, while circumcision on a consenting adult is generally viewed as a morally permissible action. Positions taken on the issue are heavily influenced by prevalence in the given area, religion, and culture. Some medical associations take the position that circumcision is an infringement of the child's autonomy and should be deferred until they are capable of making the decision themselves. Others state that parents should be allowed to determine what is in their best interest.

=== Regulations ===
Worldwide, most polities have no laws about circumcision of males, with religious infant circumcision legal in every country. A few countries have passed legislation on the procedure: Germany allows routine circumcision, while non-religious routine neonatal circumcision is regulated in South Africa and Sweden. No major medical organization recommends circumcising all males, and no major medical organization recommends banning the procedure.

In the academic literature, there is general agreement among both supporters and opponents of the practice that an outright ban would be predominately ineffective and "harmful". A consensus to keep the procedure within the purview of medical professionals is found across all major medical organizations, which advise medical professionals to yield to some degree to parental preferences in their decision to circumcise. The Royal Dutch Medical Association, which expresses some of the strongest opposition to routine neonatal circumcision, argues that while there are valid reasons for banning it, doing so could lead parents who insist on it to turn to poorly trained practitioners instead of medical professionals.

During the 2010s, several right-wing nationalist parties prominently called for the banning of circumcision. Randi Gressgård, Researcher at the Centre for Women's and Gender Research (SKOK) at the University of Bergen, argued that politicians that supported Norway's proposed circumcision ban debated circumcision in a manner which constituted "ethnocentrism".

=== Economic considerations ===
The cost-effectiveness of circumcision has been studied to determine whether a policy of circumcising all newborns or a policy of promoting and providing inexpensive or free access to circumcision for all adult men who choose it would result in lower overall societal healthcare costs. As HIV/AIDS is an incurable disease that is expensive to manage, significant effort has been spent studying the cost-effectiveness of circumcision to reduce its spread in parts of Africa that have a relatively high infection rate and low circumcision prevalence. Several analyses have concluded that circumcision programs for adult men in Africa are cost-effective and in some cases cost-saving. In Rwanda, circumcision has been found to be cost-effective across a wide range of age groups from newborn to adult, with the greatest savings achieved when it is performed in the newborn period due to the lower cost per procedure and greater timeframe for HIV infection protection. Circumcision to prevent HIV transmission in adults has also been found to be cost-effective in South Africa, Kenya, and Uganda, with cost savings estimated in the billions of US dollars over 20 years. Hankins et al. (2011) estimated that a $1.5 billion investment in circumcision for adults in 13 high-priority African countries would yield $16.5 billion in savings.

The overall cost-effectiveness of neonatal circumcision has also been studied in the United States, which has a different cost setting from Africa in areas such as public health infrastructure, availability of medications, and medical technology and the willingness to use it. A CDC study suggests that newborn circumcision is societally cost-effective in the U.S., based on its efficacy against the transmission of HIV alone during coitus, without considering any other benefits. The American Academy of Pediatrics (2012) recommends that neonatal circumcision in the U.S. be covered by third-party payers such as Medicaid and insurance. A 2014 review that considered reported benefits of circumcision such as reduced risks of HIV, HPV, and HSV-2 stated that circumcision is cost-effective in the U.S. and Africa and may result in health care savings. A 2014 literature review found significant gaps in the literature on male and female sexual health that must be addressed for the literature to be applicable to North American populations.
