= Meatal stenosis =

Narrowing of the urethra at the external meatus

Urethral meatal stenosis
- Other names: Urethral stricture
- Specialty: Urology

Urethral meatal stenosis is a narrowing (stenosis) of the opening of the urethra at the external meatus /miːˈeɪtəs/, thus constricting the opening through which urine leaves the body from the urinary bladder.

== Symptoms and signs ==
- Visible narrow opening at the meatus in boys
- Irritation, scarring or swelling of the meatus in boys
- Abnormal strength and direction of urinary stream
- Discomfort with urination (dysuria and frequency)
- Incontinence (day or night)
- Bleeding (hematuria) at end of urination
- Urinary tract infections - increased susceptibility due to stricture

== Causes ==
In the absence of the foreskin the meatus is exposed to mechanical and chemical irritation from ammoniacal diaper (nappy) that produces blister formation and ulceration of the urethral opening, which eventually gives rise to meatal stenosis (a narrowing of the opening). Meatal stenosis may also possibly be caused by ischemia resulting from damage to the frenular artery during circumcision.

== Risk factors ==
Risk factors for meatal stenosis include:

Circumcision

Hypospadias repair

Balanitis xerotica obliterans (BXO)

Long-term urinary catheter usage

Trauma to the penis

== Diagnosis ==
In males, history and physical exam are used to make the diagnosis. In females, VCUG (voiding cystourethrogram) is usually diagnostic. Kidney function studies, urine flow rate, evidence of urinary tract blockage, and other physiological measurements should be taken into account when making a diagnosis, rather than just visual inspection. Other tests may include:

- Urine analysis
- Urine culture
- CBC, basic metabolic panel
- Renal and bladder ultrasound

== Prevention ==
=== In the newborn ===
A meta-analysis of 3 trials found that petroleum jelly significantly reduces the risk of meatal stenosis in newly circumcised infants. MedlinePlus recommends keeping the diaper clean and to avoid exposing the newborn's penis to any irritants after circumcision.

=== After hypospadias repair ===
Meir & Livne (2004) suggest that use of a broad spectrum antibiotic after hypospadias repair will "probably reduce meatal stenosis [rates]", while Jayanthi (2003) recommends the use of a modified Snodgrass hypospadias repair.

== Treatment ==
In females, meatal stenosis can usually be treated in the physician's office using local anesthesia to numb the area and dilating (widening) the urethral opening with special instruments.

In males, it is treated by a second surgical procedure called meatotomy in which the meatus is crushed with a straight mosquito hemostat and then divided with fine-tipped scissors.

== Prognosis ==
Most people can expect normal urination after treatment.

== Incidence ==
Although circumcision is believed to be a primary factor, reported incidence of meatal stricture among circumcised males is uncertain. Emedicine (2016) stated that meatal stenosis rates in some studies run anywhere from 9 to 20 percent, while noting that these estimates are difficult to fully ascertain. Sörensen & Sörensen (1988), Cathcart et al. (2006), and Simforoosh et al. (2010) reported 0 percent, 0.55 percent, and 0.55 percent respectively. Van Howe (2006) reported an incidence of 7.29 percent and Frisch & Simonsen (2016) placed the incidence at 5 to 20 percent of circumcised boys.

A 2017 meta-analysis of 27 studies covering 1.4 million men concluded that that the rate of meatal stenosis in circumcised males (0.66%) was not statistically different than the rate found in uncircumcised males.
