= Skin bridge =

Penile skin adhesion

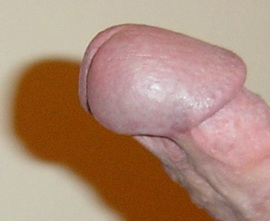
A skin bridge is visible by the glans

A skin bridge is a penile skin adhesion. It most commonly occurs as a consequence of an improperly healed circumcision, being formed when the inner lining of the remaining foreskin attaches to another part of the penis (normally the glans) as the cut heals. The condition is treatable with surgical excision.
