= Meatotomy =

Surgical modification of the male urinary meatus

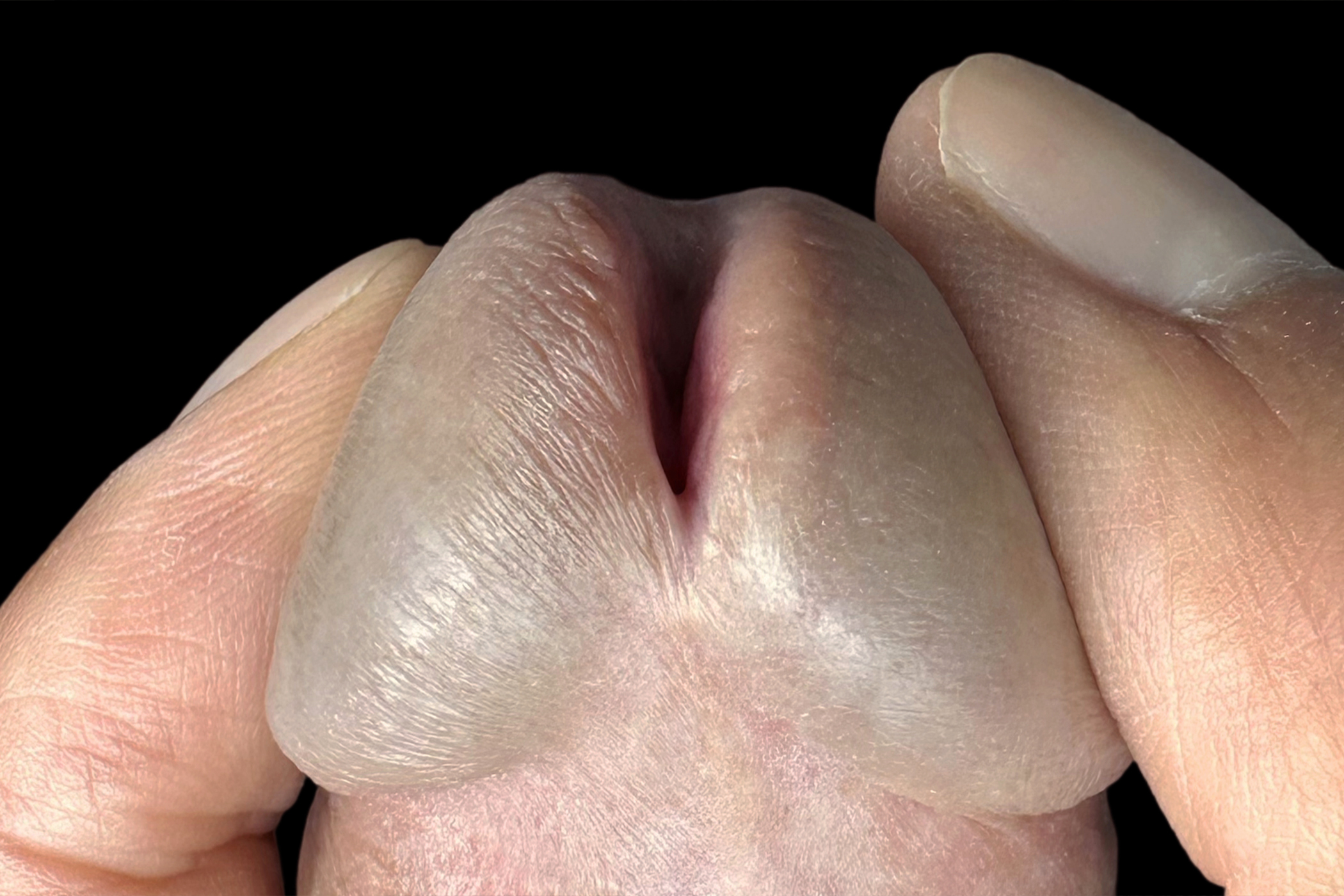
- Glans penis following meatotomy, a surgical widening of the urinary meatus typically performed to treat meatal stenosis. Manual retraction is shown to provide a clear view of the widened orifice.
- Specialty: Urology

A meatotomy (/miːəˈtɒtəmɪ/) is a form of penile modification in which the underside of the glans is split, extending the urinary meatus. The procedure may be performed by a doctor to alleviate meatal stenosis or urethral stricture.

== See also ==
- Body modification
- Penile subincision

== Notes ==
Specific

Bibliography

- Choudhury, Dhiraj (2008), General Surgical Operations, Jaypee Brothers Medical Publishers, p. 336, ISBN 978-81-8448-195-2
- Palmer, Jeffrey S. (2010), Pediatric Urology: A General Urologist's Guide, Springer, p. 132, ISBN 978-1-60327-419-7
- Yachia, Daniel (2007), Text Atlas of Penile Surgery, CRC Press, pp. 151–152, ISBN 978-1-84184-517-3
