= Lingual frenuloplasty =

Tongue surgery procedure

A lingual frenuloplasty, or frenuloplasty of the tongue, is a frenuloplasty of the frenulum of the tongue.

A tight frenulum, ankyloglossia, in this context is sometimes referred to as tongue-tie. In this condition the frenulum of the tongue restricts the range of motion, possibly interfering with breastfeeding or speech. A less extensive clipping of the lingual frenulum is known as a frenotomy.

== See also ==
- Frenectomy
