= Frenuloplasty of prepuce of penis =

Surgical procedure

- Other names: Release of frenulum
- Specialty: Urology

A frenuloplasty of prepuce of penis (also known as a release of frenulum) is a frenuloplasty of the frenulum of prepuce of penis.

An abnormally short or sensitive frenulum of the penis can make some types of sexual activity uncomfortable or even painful. This may be a complication of circumcision or a naturally occurring event. When it is a naturally occurring event, a short frenulum can restrict normal retraction of the foreskin during erection (a condition known as frenulum breve). The goal of treatment is to allow normal retraction of the foreskin. Circumcision may relieve this condition but is not indicated solely for treating frenulum breve.

== Procedure ==
The procedure usually involves the removal of the frenulum or the creation of an incision in the frenulum that is then stretched to lengthen it and stitched closed. The incision can be z-shaped, y-shaped or a single horizontal cut. Once healed, the procedure effectively elongates the frenulum, allowing normal function. Under normal circumstances the incision heals completely in around six to eight weeks, after which time normal sexual activity can resume. Other methods of treatment include horizontal stitches in the frenulum which over the course of a week cut through the tight skin, elongating it. This is generally more painful than the standard procedure, but heals faster.

Another reason for the treatment is to correct a rare complication of a frenulum breve which presents as scars on the frenulum, these scars cause pain and make normal sex very difficult and are caused by the rubbing of the frenulum whilst engaging in sexual activity. These scars only affect those with frenulum breve. The frenuloplasty can be conducted under both general or local anesthesia.

== Risks ==
One study suggests around 15–20% of men require additional circumcision after a frenuloplasty, because not all symptoms indicating the surgery improved. The British Association of Urological Surgeons (BAUS) estimates this number to be lower at 2–10%. Frenuloplasty might avoid the need for circumcision even when a clinician felt circumcision to be indicated at presentation.

A swelling of the penis occurs in 10–50% of patients after operation, usually lasting a few days. Reduced sensation in the glans penis is reported in 2–10% of patients. Below 2% of patients experience an infection of the incision requiring antibiotics or further treatment.

== Gallery ==
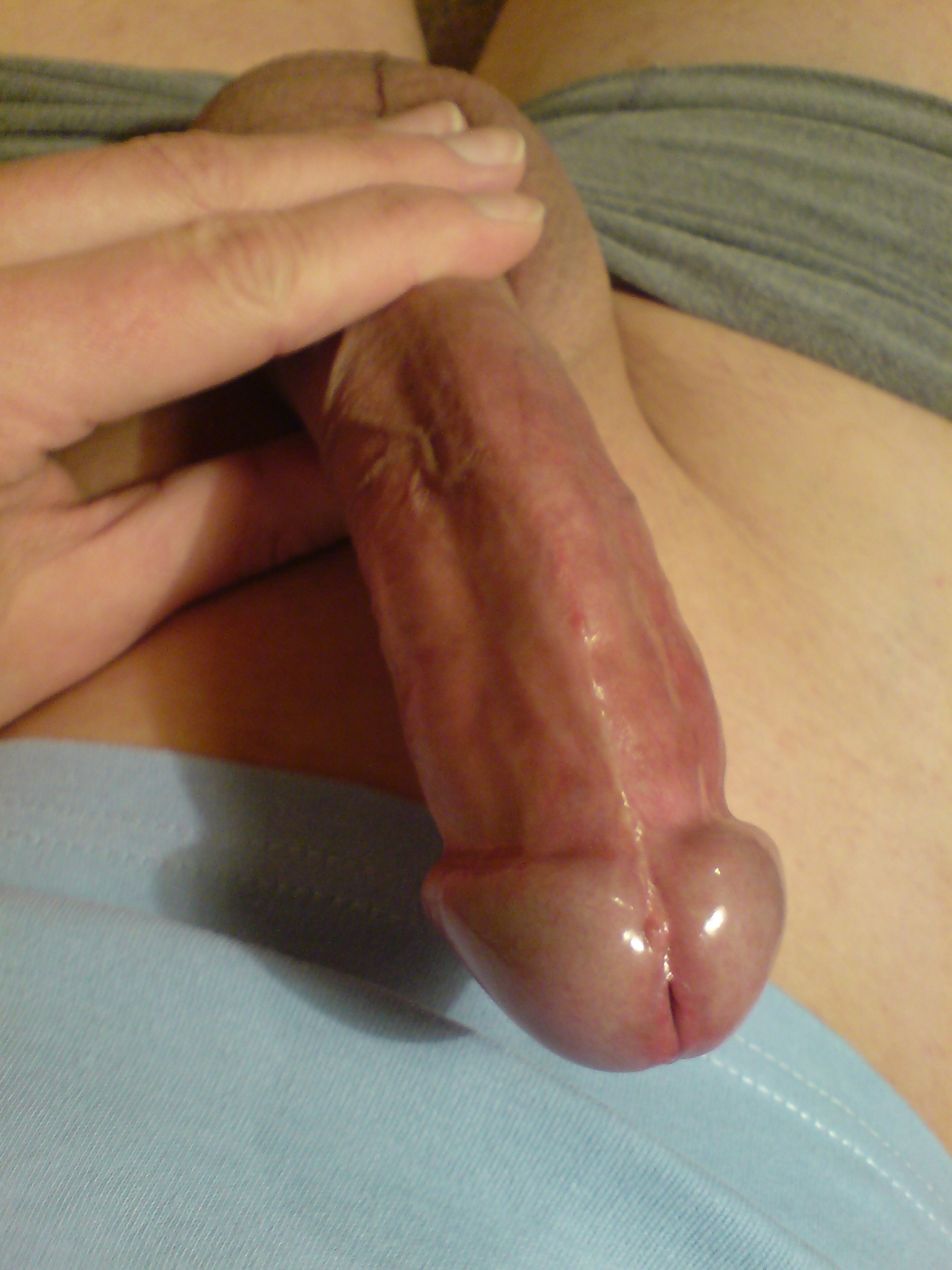
A removed frenulum preputii penis

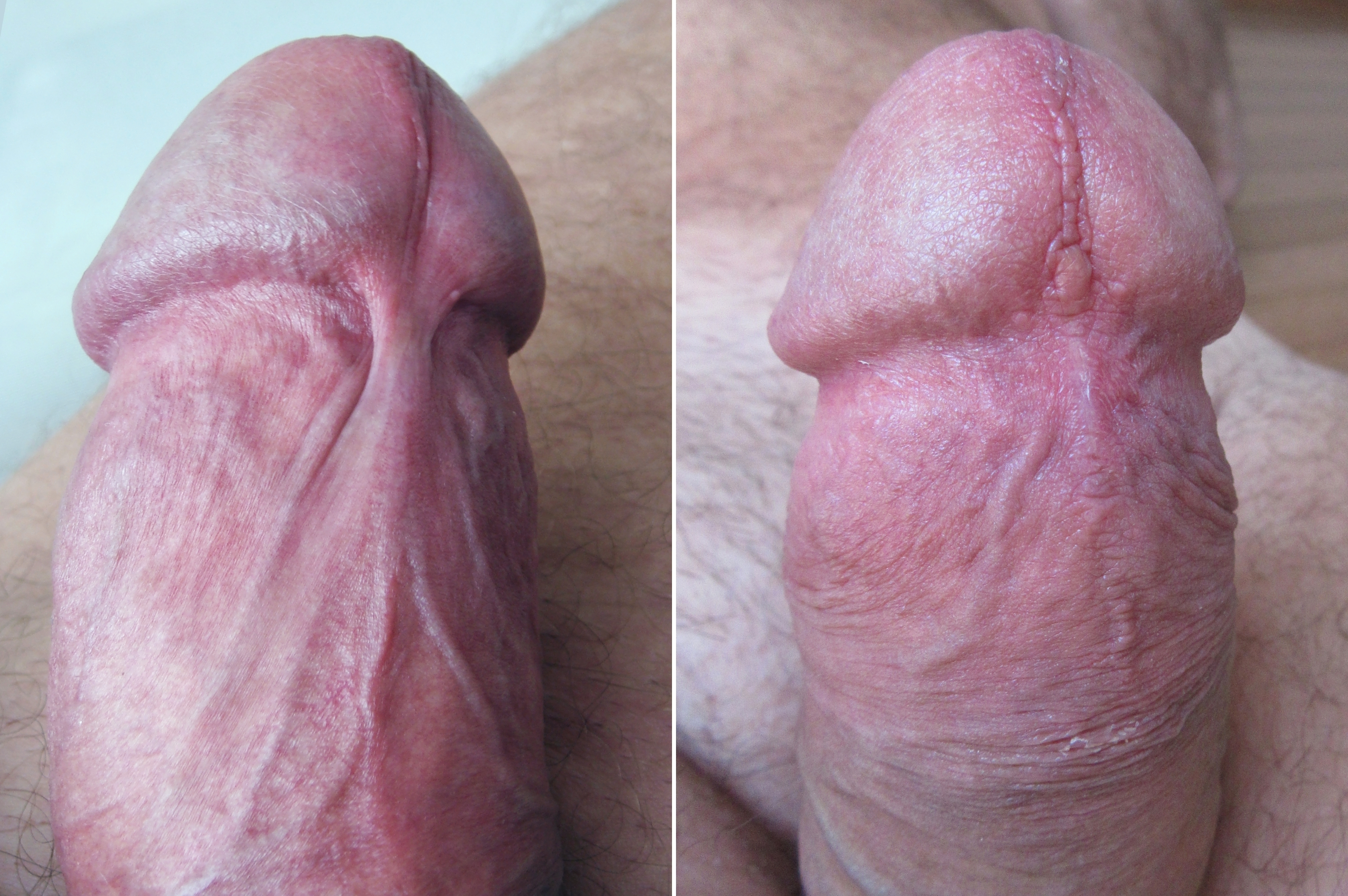
Before and after frenuloplasty

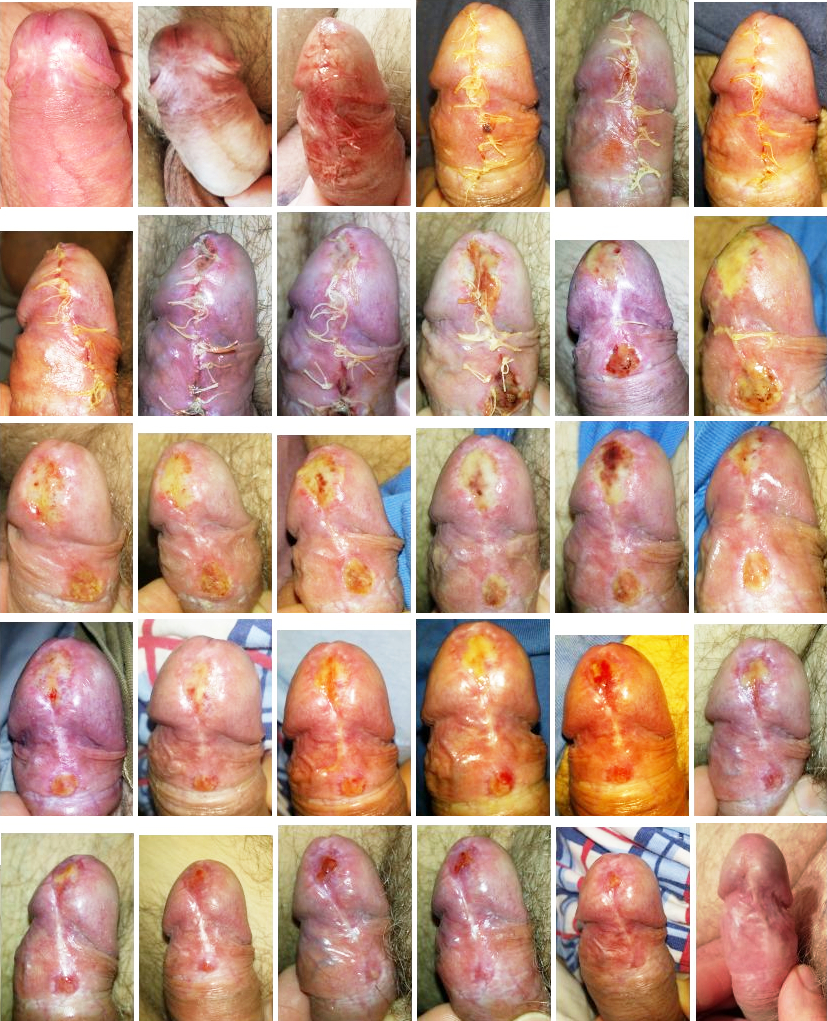
Healing of frenuloplasty

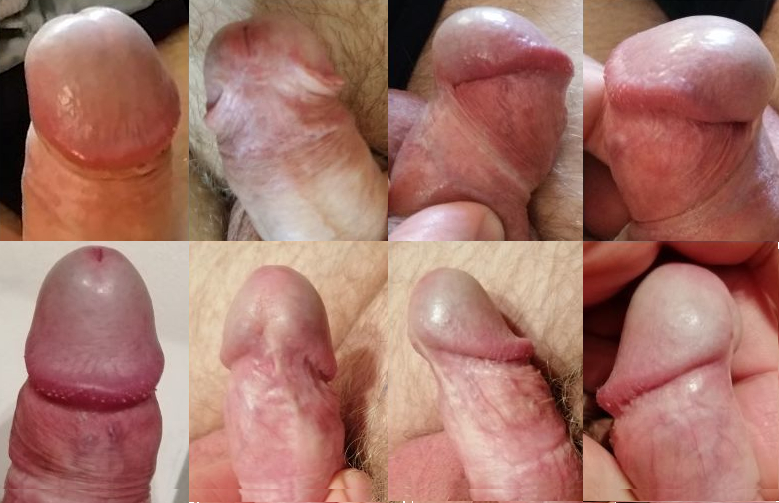
Before and after frenoloplasty
