= Genital frenulum =

A genital frenulum is a frenulum that is part of the genitals. This includes:

- Frenulum of clitoris
- Frenulum of labia minora
- Frenulum of penis
