= Labial frenectomy =

Surgical removal of the labial frenulum

- A labial frenectomy. The uppermost photo displays a maxillary labial frenum that was deemed disruptive to orthodontic treatment by the patient's orthodontist. The middle photo displays the labial fold after the frenum was incised (note the diamond-shaped wound). The third photo displays the wound after suturing of the incision which was completed.
- ICD-9-CM: 528.5

A labial frenectomy is a frenectomy performed on the lip.

The labial frenulum, also known as lip-tie, often attaches to the center of the upper lip and between the upper two front teeth. This can cause a large gap and gum recession by pulling the gums off the bone. A labial frenectomy removes the labial frenulum. Orthodontic patients often have this procedure done to assist with closing a front tooth gap. When a denture patient's lips move, the frenulum pulls and loosens the denture, which can be uncomfortable. This surgery is often done to help dentures fit better. A labial frenectomy can result in significant improvement in breastfeeding outcomes.
