= Lorum (piercing) =

Genital piercing

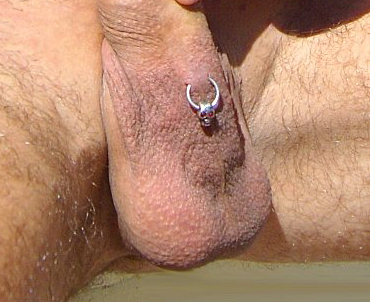
- Location: Frenum
- Jewelry: Barbell, captive bead ring

A lorum is a male genital piercing, placed horizontally on the underside of the penis at its base, where the penis meets the scrotum. The word "lorum" is a portmanteau of the words "low" and "frenum", so named because it is essentially a very low-placed frenum piercing.

Much like the frenum piercing, the lorum can have multiple rungs added and be a ladder as well.

Jewelry typically used in this piercing includes the straight barbell and the captive bead ring. However, there have been cases where other jewelry such as studs and horseshoe barbells have been used.

== See also ==
- Hafada (scrotal) piercing
