= Frenectomy =

Surgical removal of a frenulum

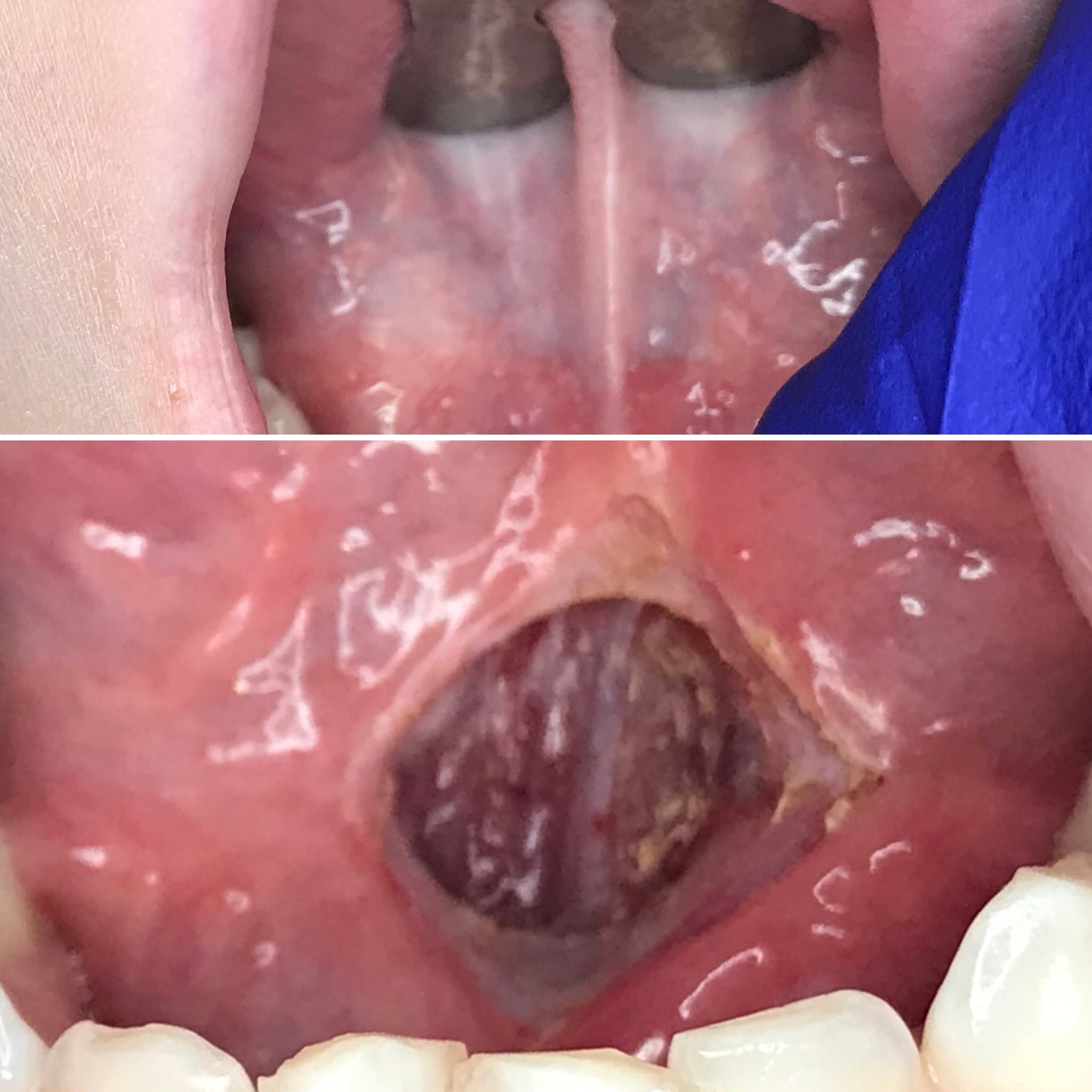
- Lingual frenectomy performed on a 5-year-old boy using a LightScalpel 10,600 nm CO_{2} laser. The photos show the frenum under the tongue immediately before the procedure and the surgical site immediately after.
- Other names: Frenulectomy, frenotomy

A frenectomy is the removal of a frenulum, a small fold of tissue that prevents an organ in the body from moving too far. It can refer to frenula in several places on the human body. It is related to frenuloplasty, a surgical alteration in a frenulum. In the mouth, frenectomies are usually performed for periodontal or orthodontic reasons. In the oral cavity, a frenectomy performed to the frenum of the lip is called a labial frenectomy, under the tongue is called a lingual frenectomy. Frenectomies are performed on infants, children, and adults. A similar procedure is a frenulotomy, where the frenum is released but not completely excised (removed).

== Types ==
There are several frenula that are associated with types of frenectomy:

- Genital frenectomy can be performed to remove frenulums from genitalia such as the penile frenulum, clitoral frenulum, or the frenulum of labia minora.
- Lingual frenectomy (of the tongue) as a treatment for ankyloglossia (tongue-tie)
- Labial frenectomy (of the lip) is very common with patients undergoing denture treatment to get the proper fit of dentures or patients who have tissues attached to center of the upper lip and causing recession of gums or gap between the upper front teeth called central incisors.
- A frenectomy can also be performed to remove a section of tissue (the frenulum) that attached to the gingival tissue between two teeth.

== Infants ==
In the past, the frenectomy procedure was perhaps the most popular of soft tissue operations in younger patients. Many labial and lingual frenum (tongue- and lip-ties) were snipped by a midwife, family doctor or dental surgeon. The overall awareness and treatment of tongue- and lip-ties especially in breastfeeding infants has increased over recent years. Frenectomies are routinely performed on infants to improve breastfeeding outcomes.

In 2020, medical professionals raised the concern that a recent rise in unnecessary frenectomies on infants may be encouraged in part by information shared in online parenting groups. While public healthcare options (e.g. NHS) may not cover frenectomies, in part due to these concerns, private clinic surgeries remain viable options for concerned parents.

Traditionally tongue-ties are diagnosed by appearance alone; newer research advocates for a functional assessment to determine any deleterious effect on breastfeeding. Before any surgical intervention for difficulties related to breastfeeding, preoperative consultation with a certified lactation consultant is recommended.

== Laser ==
Frenectomies can be safely and efficiently performed with a surgical soft tissue laser with predictable and repeatable tissue response, fast ablation and instant hemostasis. The precise cutting, minimal collateral damage, and bloodless operating field make a surgical laser a common choice for frenectomy procedures.
