= Penile frenulectomy =

Surgical removal of the frenulum of the penis

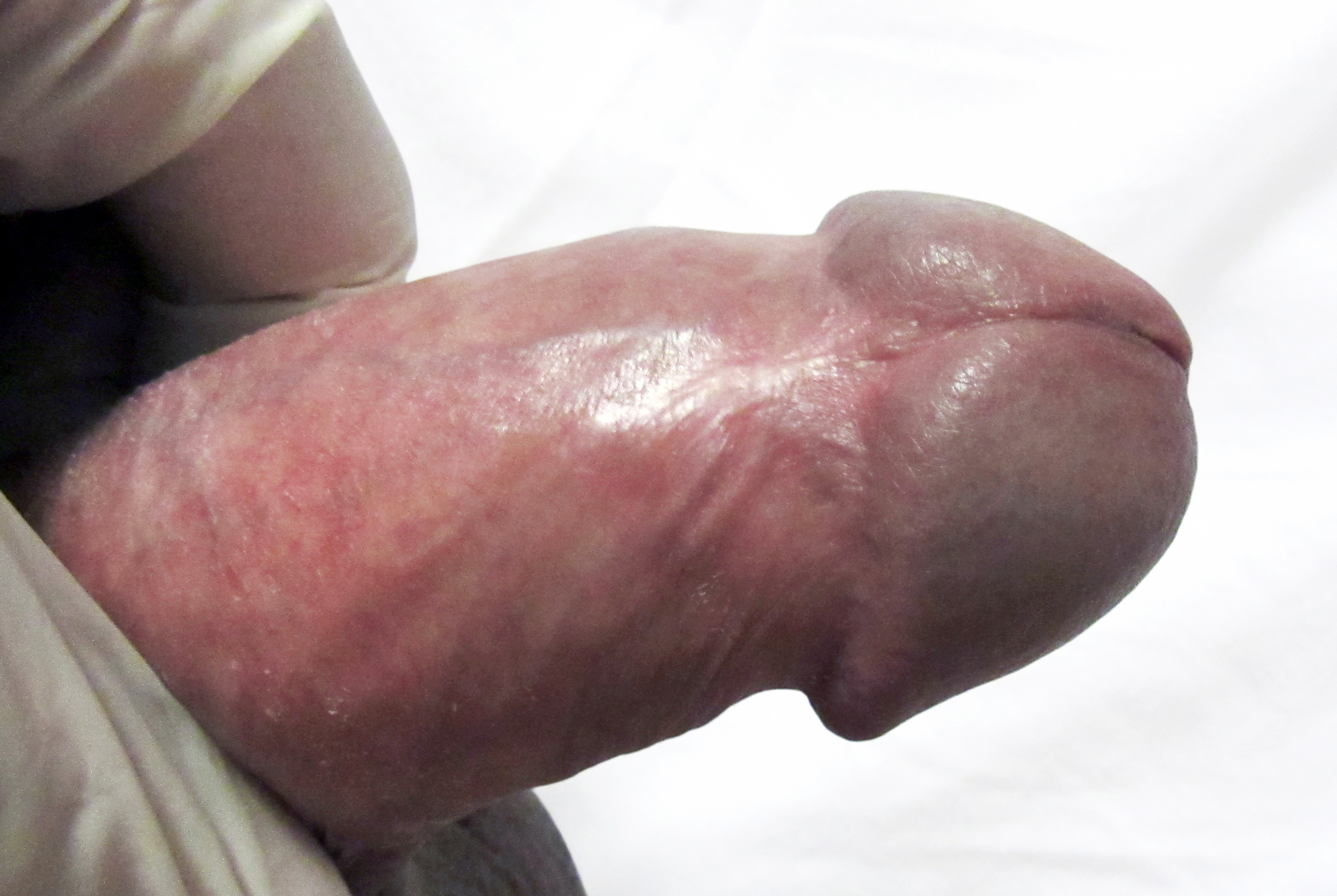
- Ventral view of a penis following a penile frenulectomy.
- Specialty: Urology

Frenulectomy of the penis is a surgical procedure for cutting and removal of the penile frenulum, to correct a condition known as frenulum breve. This condition prevents the full retraction of the foreskin. Most forms of circumcision also involve partial or complete removal of the frenulum. Alternative treatments for frenulum breve include stretching routines, steroid creams, frenulotomy (splitting the frenulum), and frenuplasty (restructuring the frenulum).

It is a simple and normally painless procedure that is performed in a urologist's office. First, the physician applies a local anesthetic, such as lidocaine/prilocaine cream on the frenulum and surrounding area. If the patient retains any feeling there after the anesthetic has had time to take effect, the physician may recommend that the procedure be performed in a hospital, with stronger anesthesia. Anesthesia is required because of the extensive and complex nerve structure of the frenulum; more advanced anesthesia called a ring-block, a type of nerve block, can be used.

Following the excision of the frenulum, the surgeon typically closes the wound using absorbable sutures, which dissolve on their own over two to four weeks. Post-operative discomfort is generally mild and can be managed with standard oral analgesics. To ensure optimal healing and prevent wound dehiscence, urological guidelines advise patients to abstain from sexual activity and masturbation for a minimum of four to six weeks.

== Post-operative outcomes ==
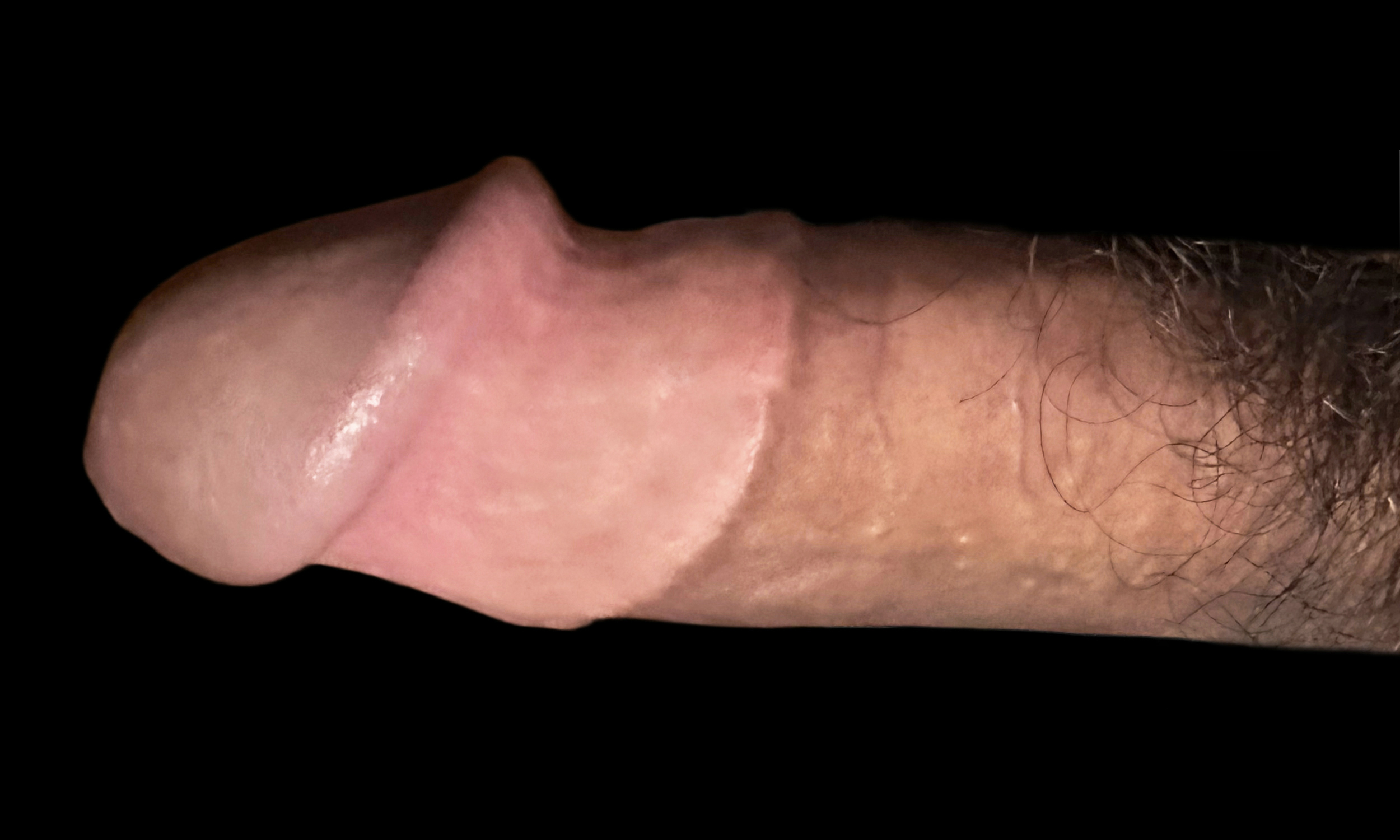
Lateral view of an erect penis following frenulectomy, demonstrating a slightly more upward-facing glans position after release of ventral frenular tethering.

From an anatomical perspective, the penile frenulum acts as a natural retractor of the foreskin and contributes to ventral tethering of the glans penis. Excision or release of the frenulum during frenulectomy or frenuloplasty eliminates this ventral tethering effect. Following healing, some individuals may notice subtle changes in the resting or erect appearance of the glans penis, including a slightly less ventrally restricted or more upward-facing glans position, particularly when the procedure is performed together with circumcision or in the context of elective appearance-related surgery. Such changes are generally considered minor cosmetic variations and do not usually require further treatment.

From a neuroanatomical perspective, the penile frenulum is a highly innervated structure containing a dense network of mechanoreceptive nerve fibres. For men who undergo the procedure to treat symptomatic frenulum breve—a condition associated with tearing, bleeding, and painful intercourse (dyspareunia)—clinical studies generally report high rates of post-operative sexual satisfaction and functional improvement. In these cases, the release of mechanical tension and elimination of pain are generally considered to outweigh any localized alteration in sensory perception following surgery.
