= Guiche =

Guiche can refer to:

- Guiche, Pyrénées-Atlantiques, a commune in the Pyrénées-Atlantiques department in south-western France.
- Gīshu, a fictional character
- a slang word for perineum; see also Guiche piercing
- guiche (鬼車, "demon chariot", Japanese: kisha), an alias of nine-headed bird of Chinese myth.
