= Frenum piercing =

Penis piercing

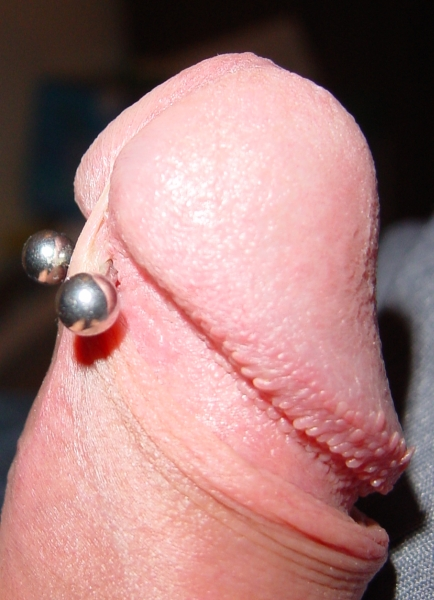
- Location: Underside of penile shaft
- Jewelry: Barbell, captive bead ring
- Healing: 2 to 5 weeks

A frenum piercing or frenulum piercing is a piercing of the penis shaft's underside. A series of parallel frenum piercings is known as a frenum ladder. A frenum ladder may extend to include lorum, hafada, and guiche piercings.

== Placement ==
It is almost always pierced through the frenum that connects the head of the penis to the shaft.

== Healing ==
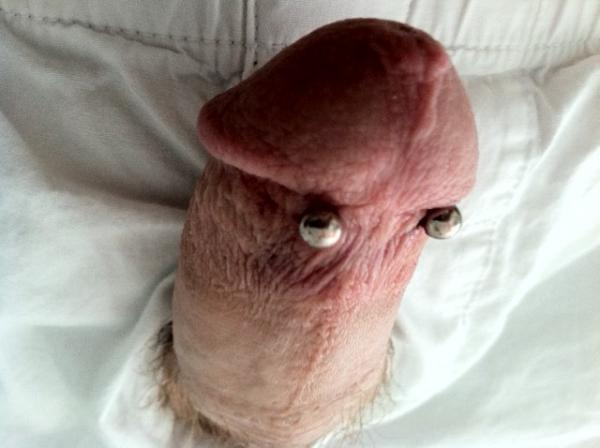
Curved 14 gauge barbell 24 hours after initial piercing, mild bruising present on right side of penile shaft below piercing due to piercing clamp.

Frenum piercings generally require from two to five weeks to heal fully. Depending on the placement it may be a surface piercing, but due to both the vascular, fast healing nature of the penis, and loose nature of the skin in that area, frenum piercings rarely reject if pierced properly, although they may migrate.

== Jewelry ==
Both barbells and rings can be worn in frenum piercings, both as initial jewellery and on an ongoing basis. Sometimes, when rings are worn, the diameter of the ring is specifically chosen so that the ring can be worn encircling the penis.

Frenum piercings of various types
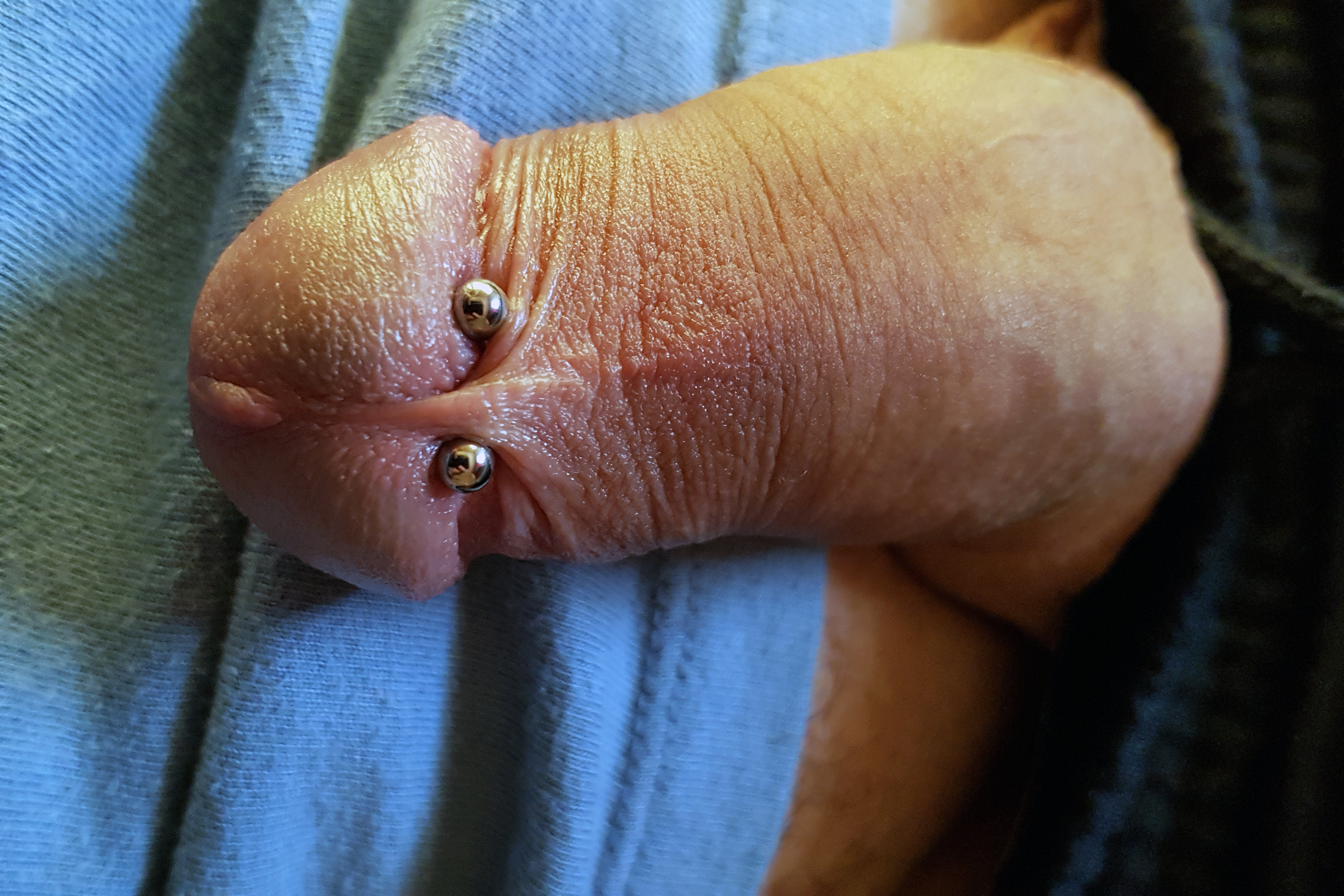
4 mm curved (banana) barbell

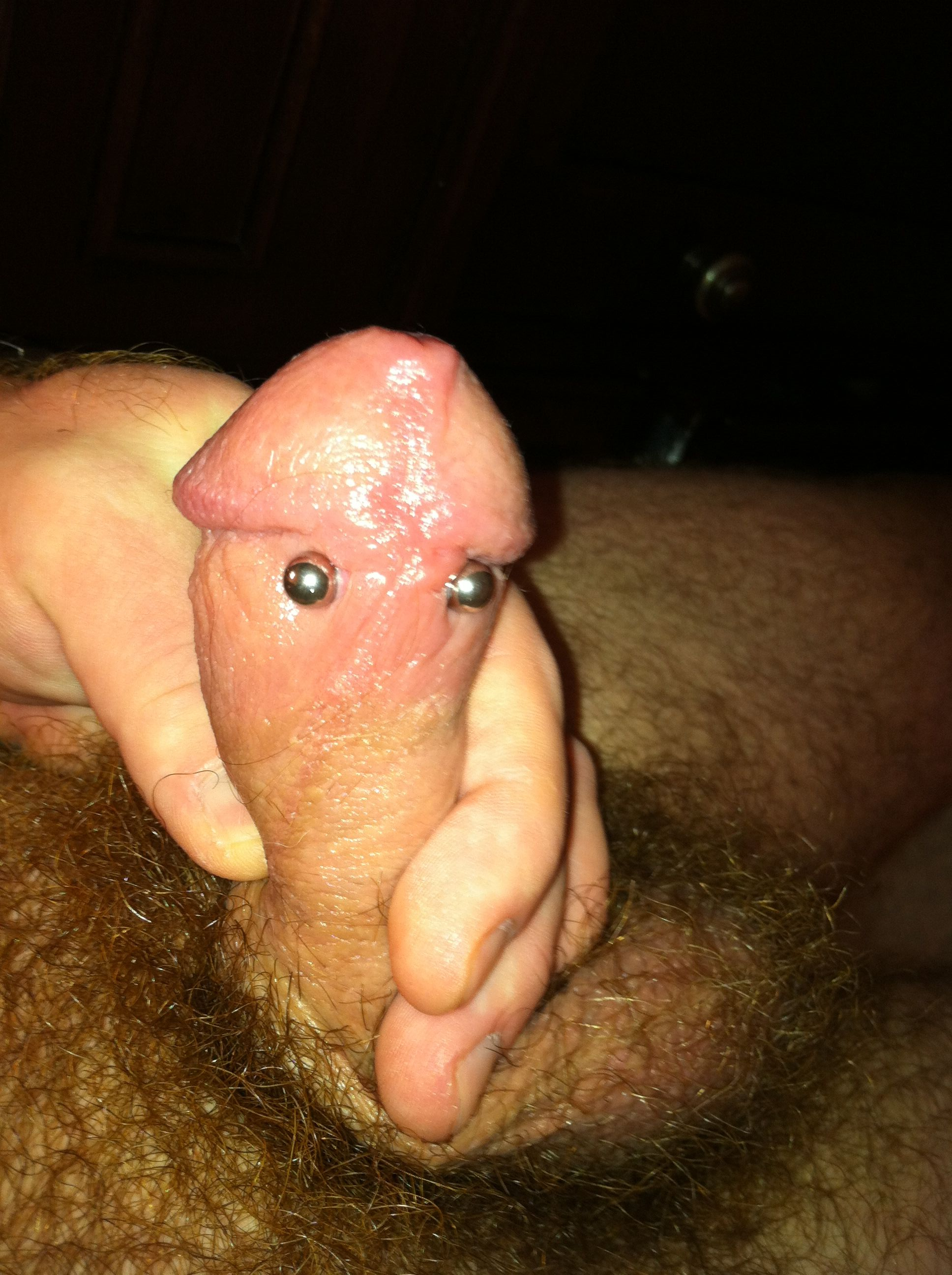
10 gauge straight barbell

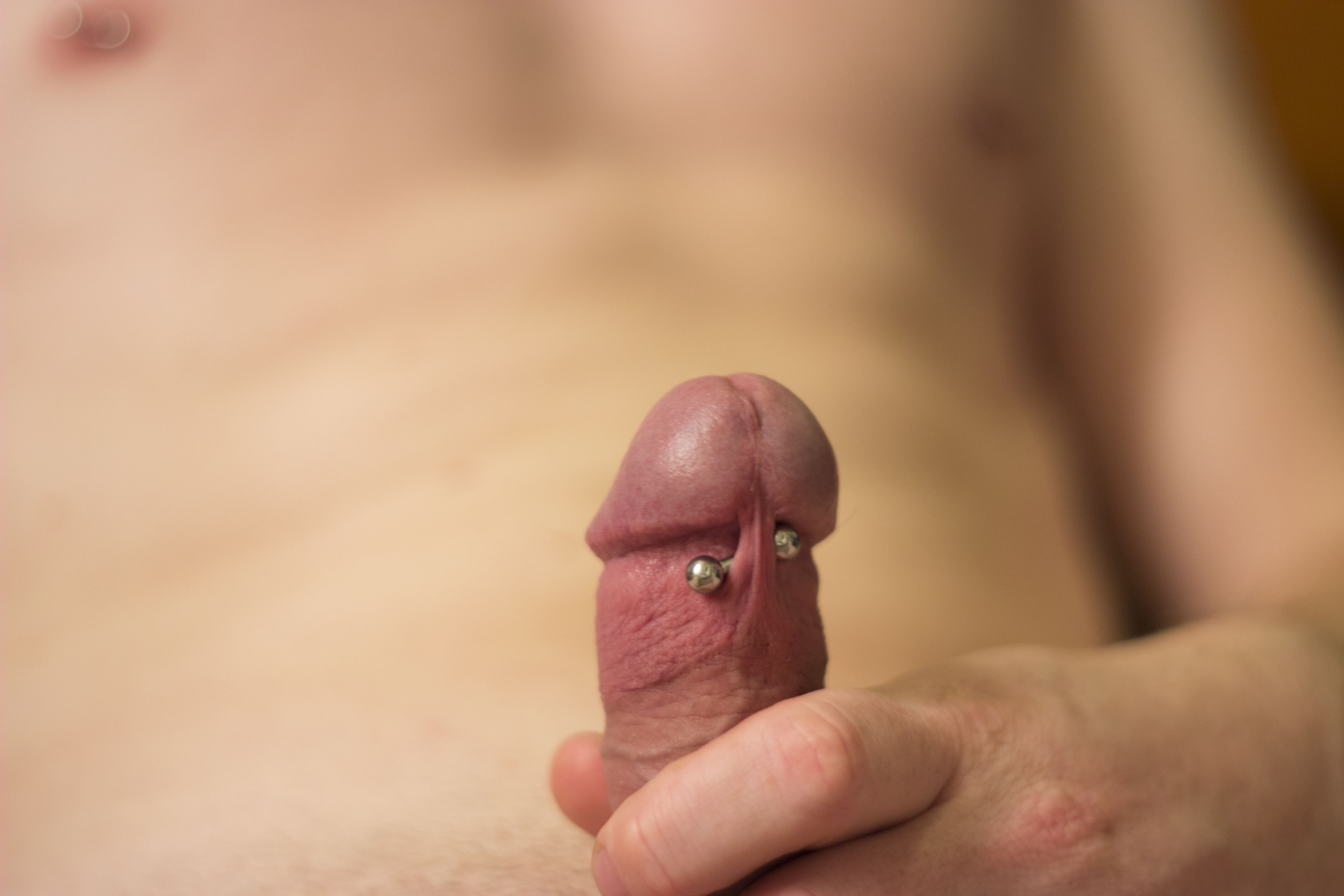
Short stainless steel barbell

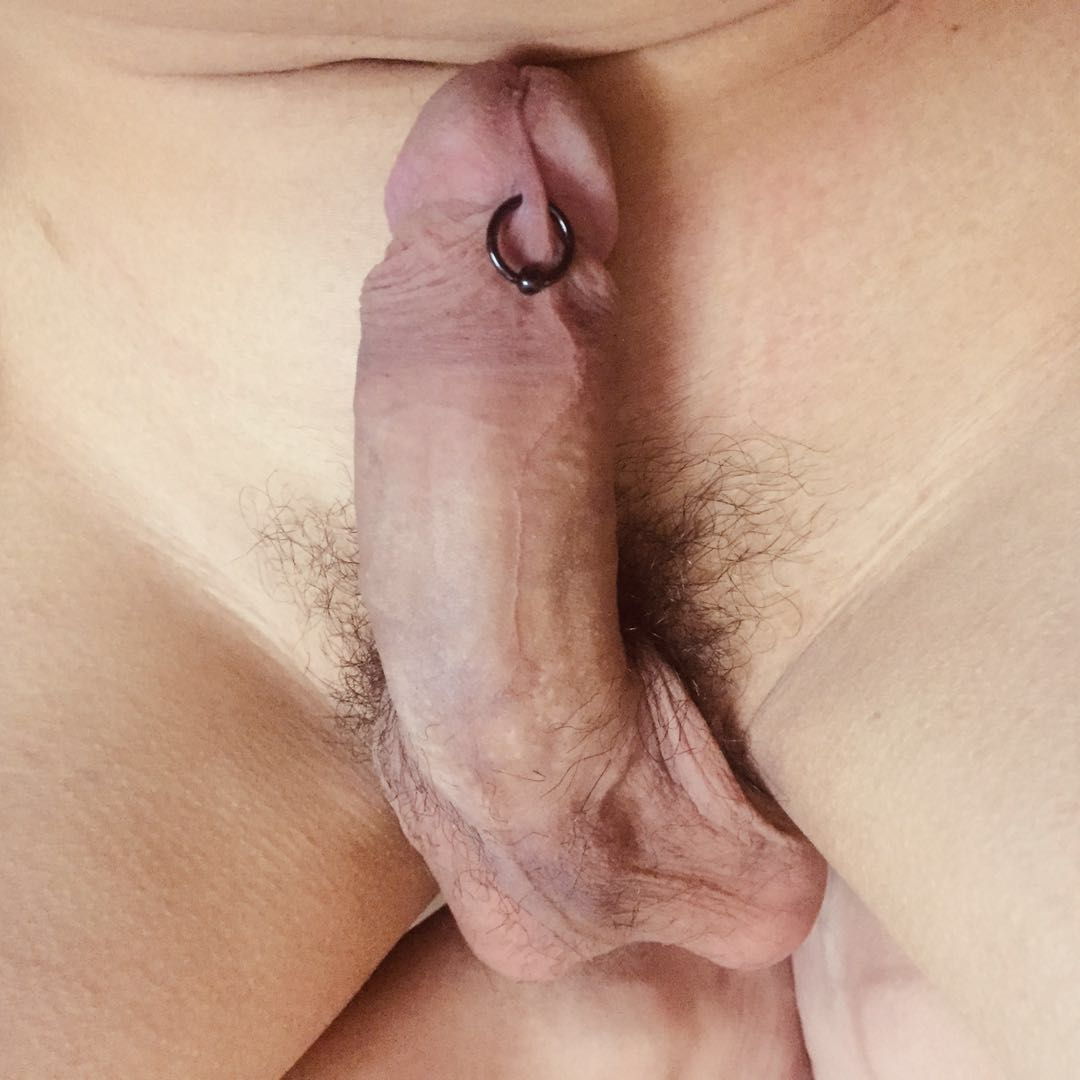
Ball closure ring

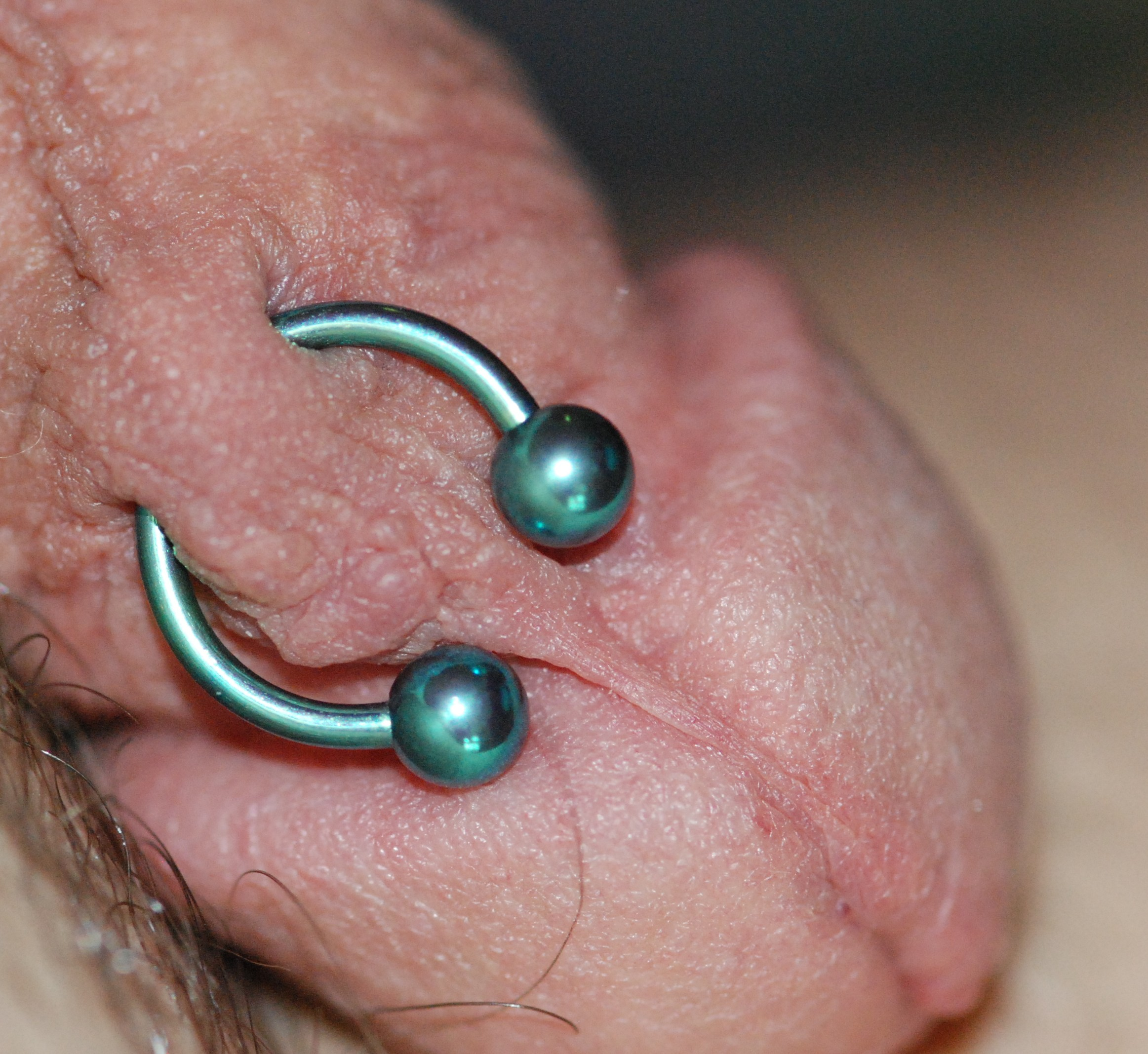
Circular barbell

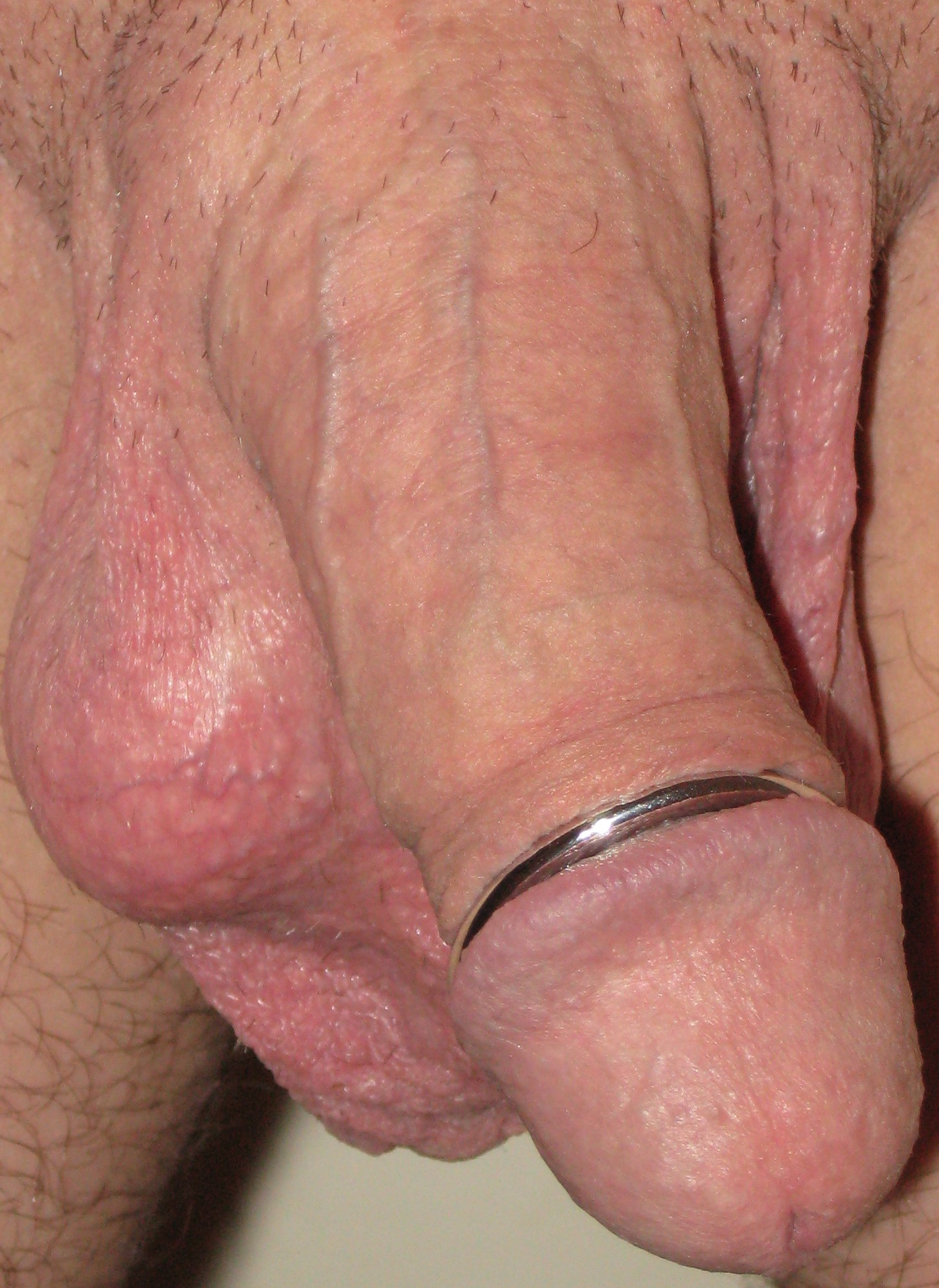
Frenum loop

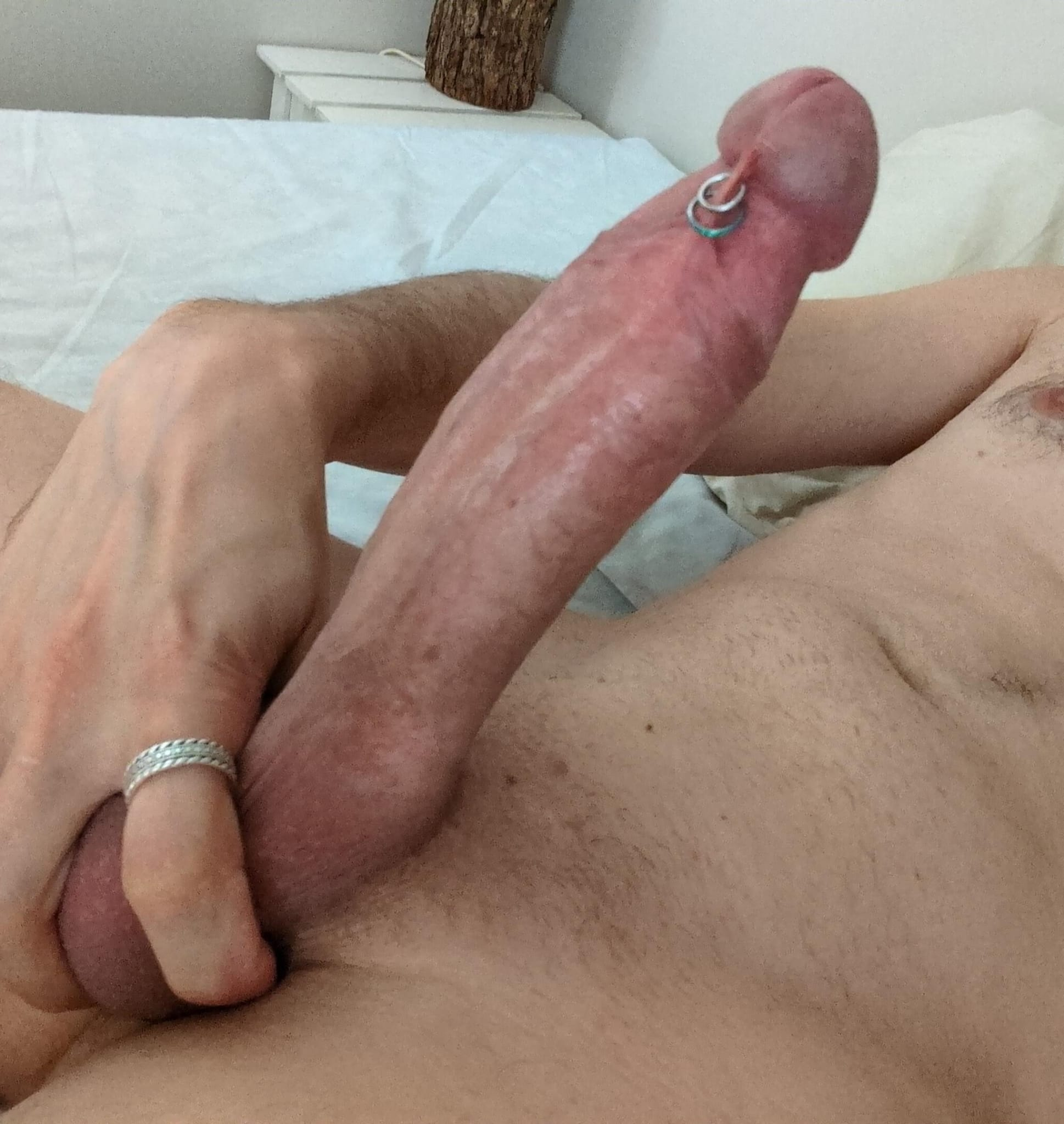
Two Frenum loops from @dospi

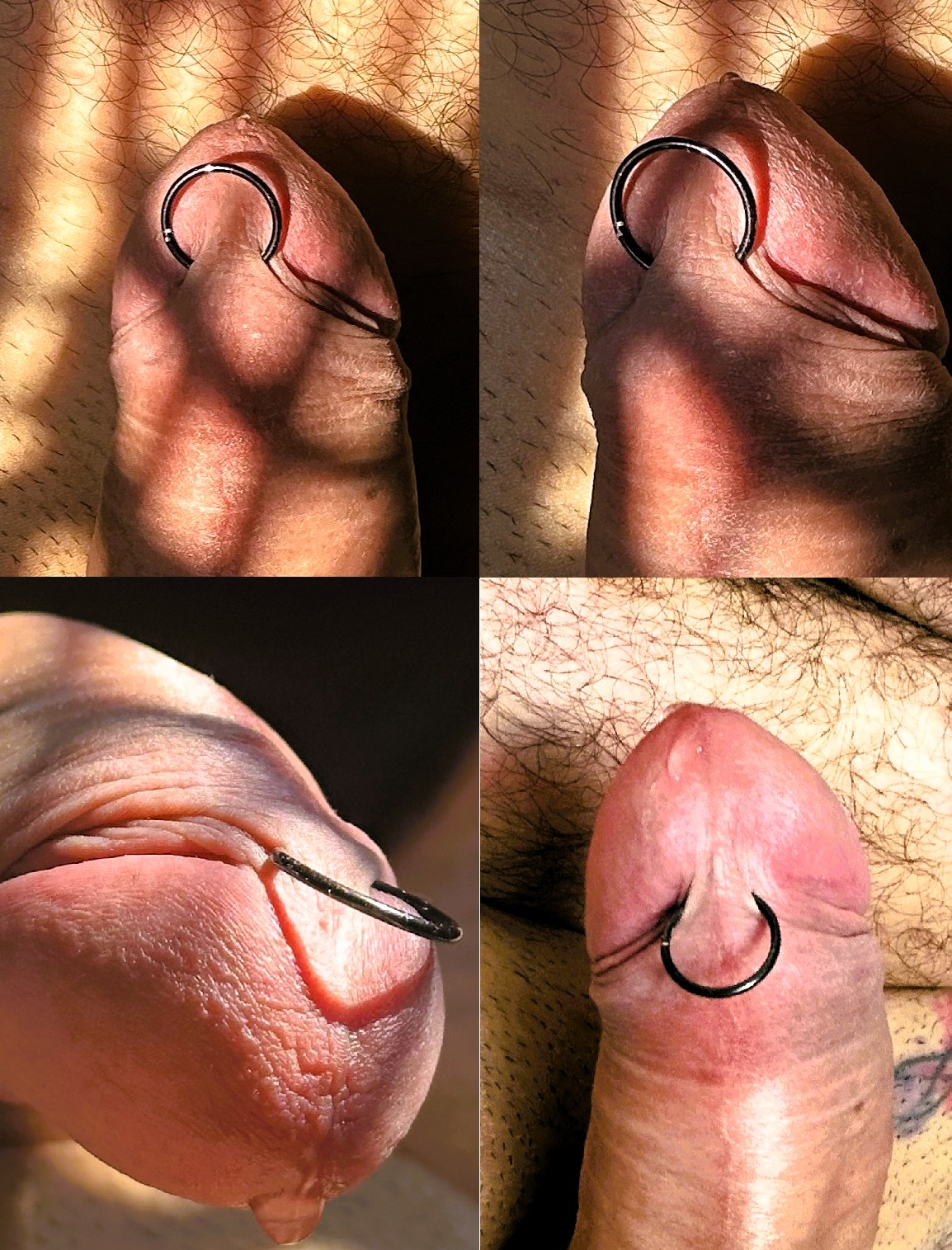
Frenum piercing from several angles

The earliest literary reference to frenum piercings occurs in 1884 in Zeitschrift für Ethnologie which states: "Amongst the Timorese of Indonesia, the Frenulum beneath the glans penis is pierced with brass rings...the function of the ring is to enhance stimulation during sex."

In contemporary society, frenum piercings were primarily found amongst the members of gay BDSM subcultures, until body piercing became re-introduced to mainstream society in the late 1970s and early 1980s.

Frenum piercings are often intended to provide sexual pleasure to both the bearer and the person they are having sexual intercourse with. They may also be used to attach chastity devices to the bearer, denying them sexual pleasure.

=== Orbital frenum ===
A less common variation of the frenum piercing is the orbital frenum, in which a single continuous ring passes through two parallel piercings placed in the skin between the glans and the shaft of the penis. Unlike separate straight barbells or individual rings inserted into each piercing channel, this configuration uses one closed piece of jewelry that links both entry points.

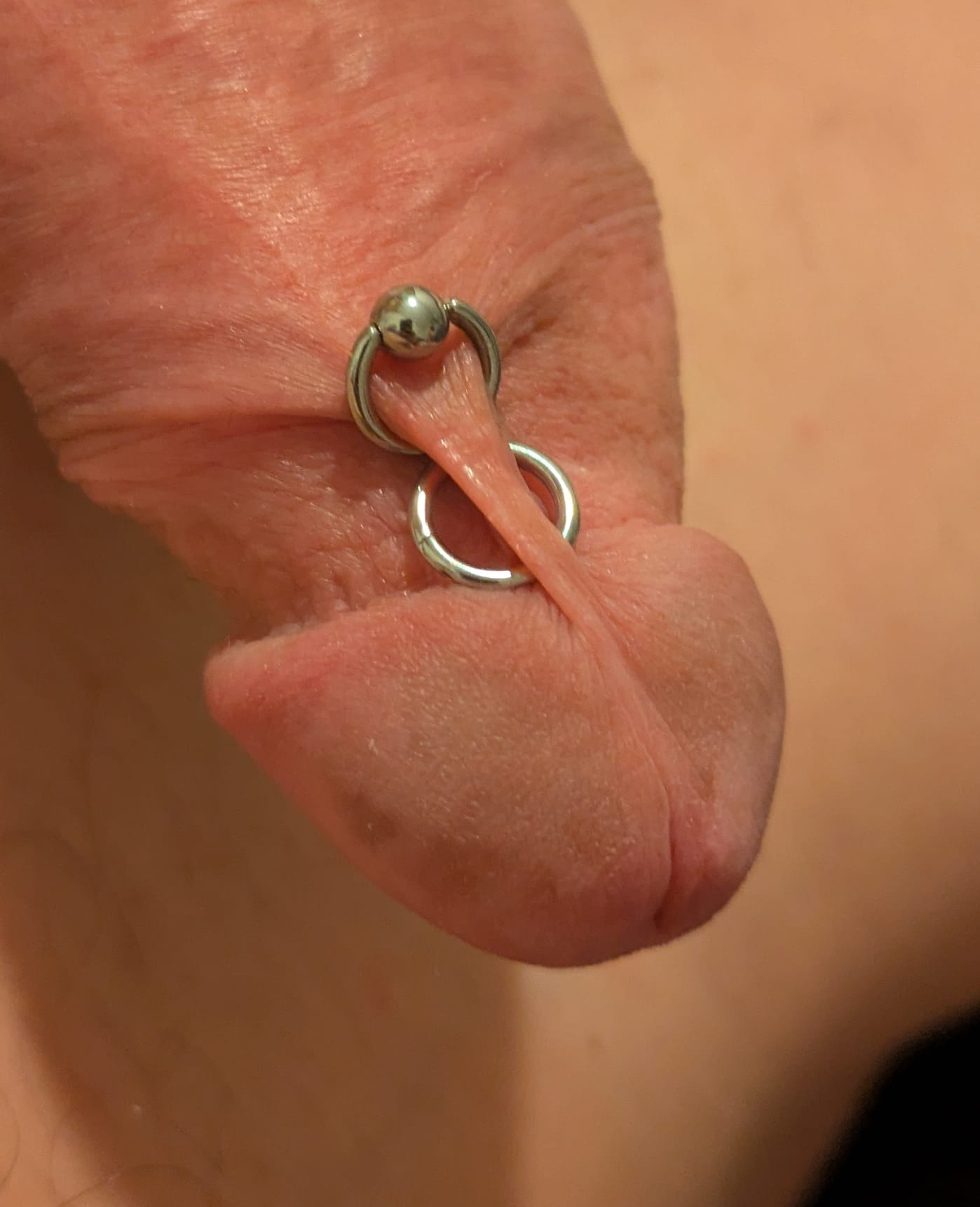
Orbital ring passing through two parallel piercings in the skin between the glans and the shaft of the penis.

== Frenum ladder ==
Frenum ladder
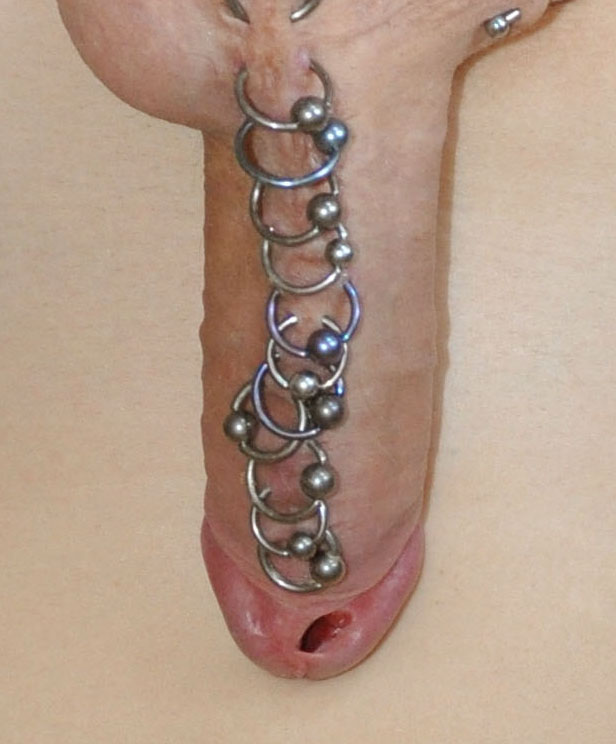
- Nicknames: Jacob's ladder
- Location: Underside of penile shaft
- Jewelry: captive bead ring barbell
- Healing: 2 to 5 weeks

A frenum ladder, also known as a Jacob's ladder, consists of a series of frenum piercings often extending from below the head of the penis and as far as the base of the shaft of the penis.

Sometimes, a frenum ladder will be accompanied by a hafada ladder and/or a guiche ladder. Due to the relatively easy healing of these piercings it is not uncommon for several, or even all of them to be performed at the same time.

Less common is a lorum ladder which consists of a series of lorum piercings.

== See also ==
- Body piercing
- Genital modification
