= Frenulum of lower lip =

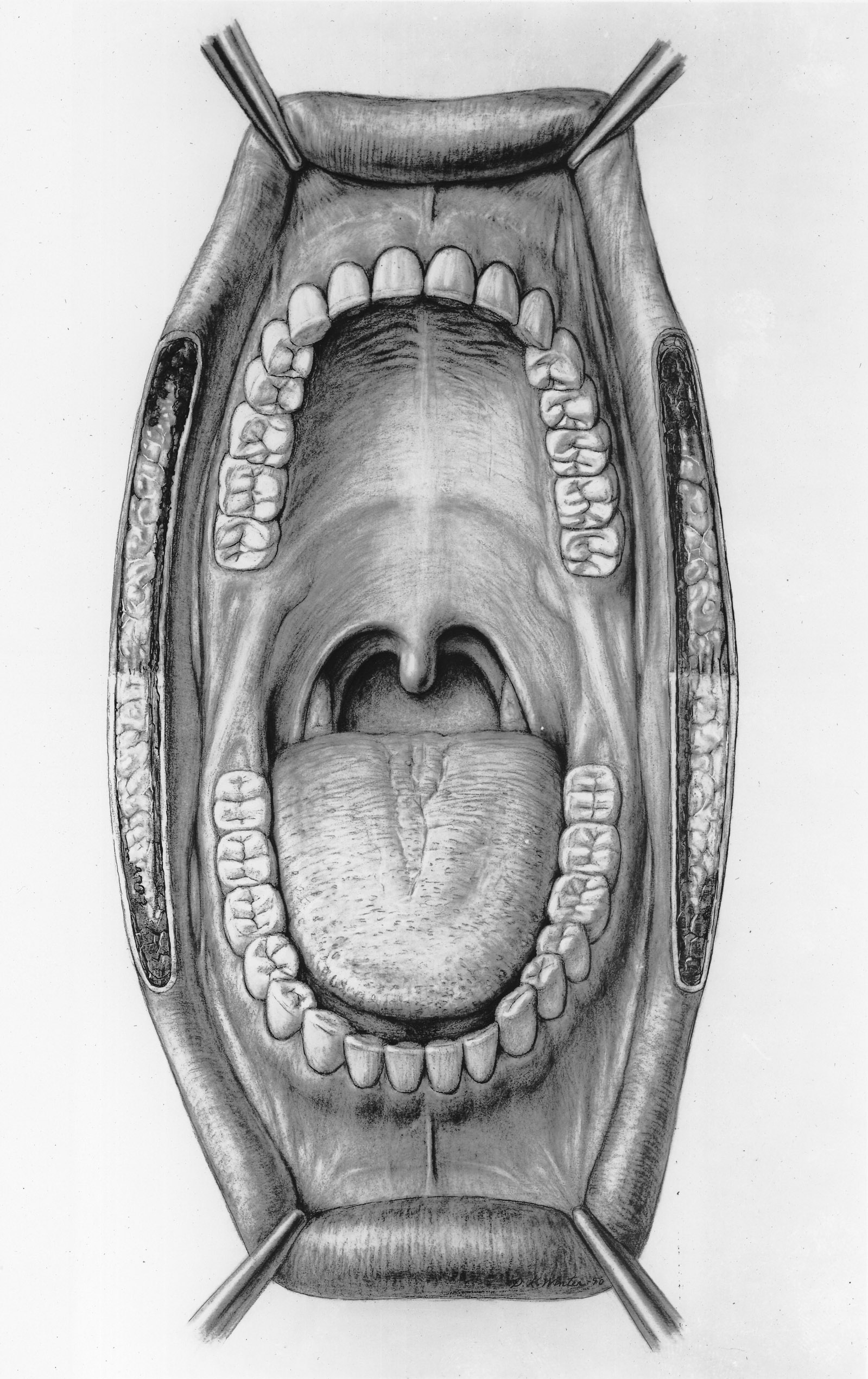
- Mouth illustration (frenulum of lower lip visible at center bottom)

Details

Identifiers
- Latin: frenulum labii inferioris oris
- TA98: A05.1.01.011
- TA2: 2787
- FMA: 59822

The inferior labial frenulum, or frenulum labii inferioris (Latin, meaning "little bridle of the lower lip"). is the frenulum connecting the lower gums with the lower lip.

== Function ==
The inferior labial frenulum, alongside the superior labial frenulum, provides stability to the upper and lower lip.

== Medical conditions ==
Absence of the inferior labial frenulum and/or the lingual frenulum is associated with the classical and hypermobility types of Ehlers–Danlos syndrome, but can also be absent in those without any underlying medical conditions.

Tearing of the inferior labial frenulum may occur after being bit, especially after a fall, resulting in bleeding and pain. Treatment can normally be done at home, and usually heals on its own within 3–4 days. Tearing of the inferior labial frenulum, as proven by various studies, can not be considered a sign of domestic abuse.

== See also ==
- Human mouth
