= Hafada piercing =

Surface piercing on the scrotum

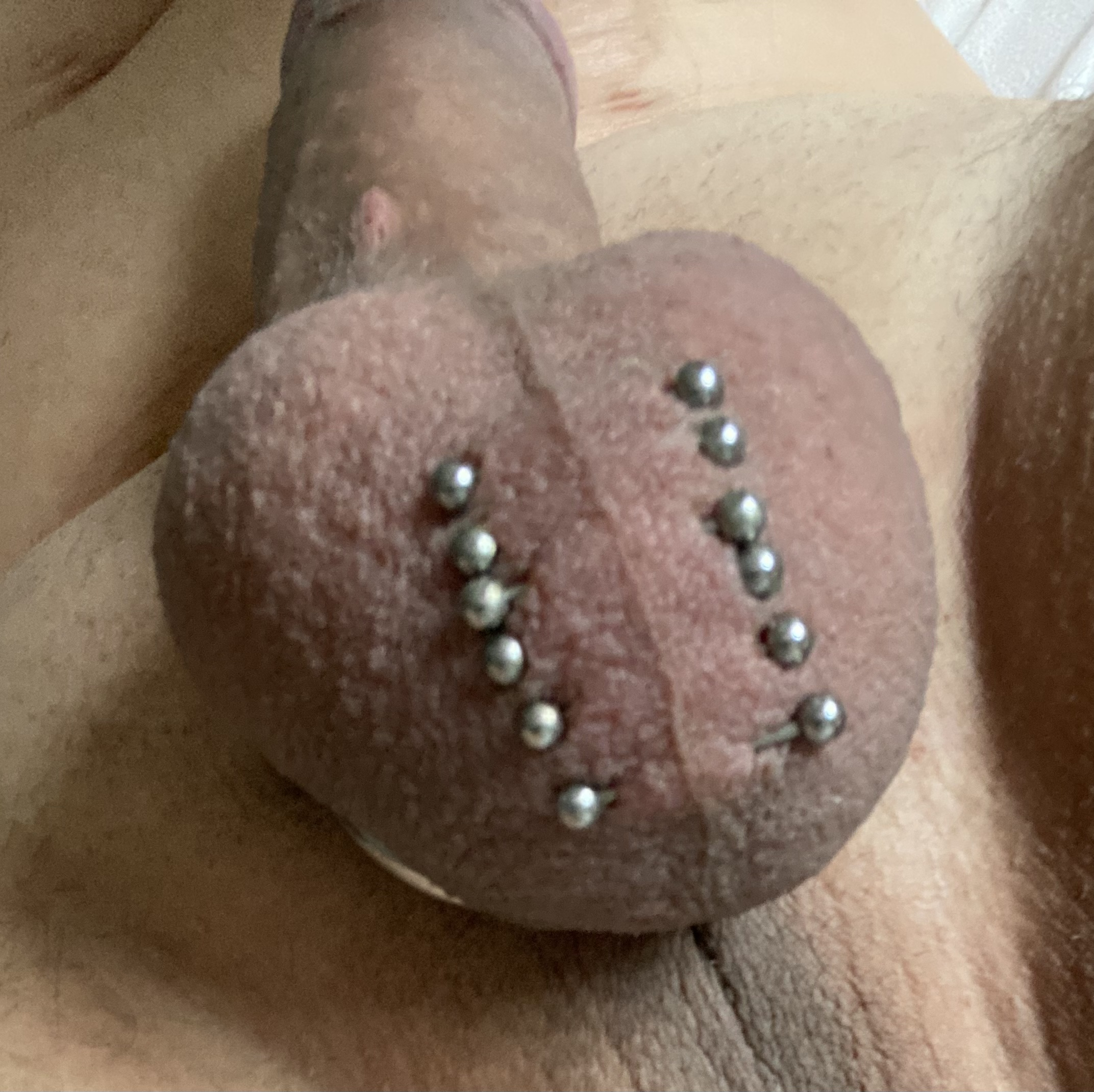
- Nicknames: Scrotal piercing
- Location: Scrotum
- Jewelry: Scrotal ladder consisting of six barbells, shown; Captive bead rings or BCRs
- Healing: 6 to 13 weeks

A hafada piercing is a surface piercing anywhere on the skin of the scrotum. Piercings on the scrotal raphe or "seam" of the scrotum are common. This piercing does not penetrate deep into the scrotum, and due to the looseness and flexibility of the skin in that area, does not migrate or reject as much as many other surface piercings. The main motives are beautification and individualization. A piercing that passes through the scrotum, from front-to-back, or from side-to-side, is known as a transscrotal piercing. Multiple hafada piercings are not uncommon, often as an extension of a frenum ladder or Jacob's Ladder, which is a series of piercings from the frenulum to the scrotum.

== Historical origin ==
The hafada piercing may have originated in Arabia and spread from there to the Middle East and North Africa. According to piercing lore, it was a ritual usually performed when a young man entered puberty. It was most commonly applied on the left side. In Europe, hafada piercing was adopted by some members of the French Legion, who were active in the areas of Syria and Lebanon. Since then, the hafada has been globalised. While originally a hafada piercing referred to a scrotal piercing with a ring or barbell placed high and laterally (i.e. on the side of the scrotum; known in the Western body-modification trade as "the first hafada"), the term hafada piercing is now used interchangeably with scrotal piercing and can refer to piercings anywhere on the scrotum ("the second hafada").

== Jewelry ==
Hafada piercings are usually pierced with a captive bead ring (also called a BCR or ball closure ring), a curved barbell or straight barbell. One source states that while rings were popular in the past, "barbells are more common nowadays." Since the skin of the scrotum is thin, titanium jewelry is advantageous due to its lower weight. Horizontal piercings (with one hole beside the other) are most common. Although vertical scrotum piercings are rare, they have been done successfully, using straight or curved barbells.

== Healing ==
Healing is relatively uncomplicated and lasts normally between six and eight weeks according to some sources, or up to 13 weeks according to other sources. A single scrotal piercing will tend to heal faster than multiple piercings. For this reason, many piercers will not place more than two or three 'rungs' of a ladder at a time, scheduling another set a month or two later.

== Advantages ==
While piercings on the penis can break a condom during intercourse, that is not a risk with piercings on the scrotum. This piercing does not interfere with sex. Due to the looseness of the skin, the rate of rejection is lower than for other surface piercings. While this piercing is primarily done for aesthetic reasons, piercings high on the scrotum (close to the penis shaft) may provide stimulation to a sexual partner during intercourse. Since the scrotum is sexually sensitive, hafada piercings may enhance pleasure when the scrotum is rubbed or orally stimulated by a partner or during masturbation. In comparison to facial piercings, a scrotal piercing is private, except in circumstances the pierced person chooses.

== Disadvantages ==
In some cases, hafada piercings might induce discomfort while walking or running, or when riding a motorcycle or on horseback, especially during the healing process. Avoidance of tight clothing would minimize any sensitivity while walking. Piercings might present minor interference when shaving the scrotum. Piercings on the scrotal raphe or "seam" of the scrotum may not be particularly visible when the penis is flaccid. Piercings anywhere on the scrotum may become hidden should the wearer choose to not shave the scrotum.

== Contraindications ==
Scrotal piercings would not be advisable for anyone with tinea cruris (jock itch) or other dermatological conditions. Men who have had a recent vasectomy should wait for incisions to heal prior to obtaining a scrotal piercing.

== Motivations ==
Scrotal piercings are done primarily for aesthetic reasons and as an artistic expression of personal style. Unlike most other male genital piercings, scrotal piercings were not devised for and are not promoted for the enhancement of sexual pleasure, either for the wearer or for a sexual partner. Any such benefits are incidental.

The presumed motivation for obtaining a scrotal piercing is simply as an adornment, either on its own, or in juxtaposition to other genital piercings. Beyond that, motivations may be simple or complex, and might not even be fully understood by the person obtaining the piercing. Some people say that even if they were the only person who ever saw their genital piercings, they would be happy with them.

For some, a scrotal piercing, which is said to be one of the least risky genital piercings, might be an "entry piercing" to test one's resolve or willingness to proceed with other genital piercings. For many who have been sexually abused, teased, or psychologically hurt in other ways, genital piercings may serve as a means to reclaim their sexuality or ownership of their genitals. Some people who obtain a genital piercing may seek a sense of uniqueness or intend to make a statement of non-conformity. Recent research suggests, however, that genital piercings are becoming mainstream, at least within some age groups, so are unlikely to succeed in providing a sense of uniqueness, signs of individuality or of subcultural identity, or as visual declarations of non-conformity. One piercer observed that, as of 2018, it was becoming more mainstream and acceptable for men to have one or multiple genital piercings, whereas in the late 1970s and early 1980s it was still very taboo.

== Gallery ==
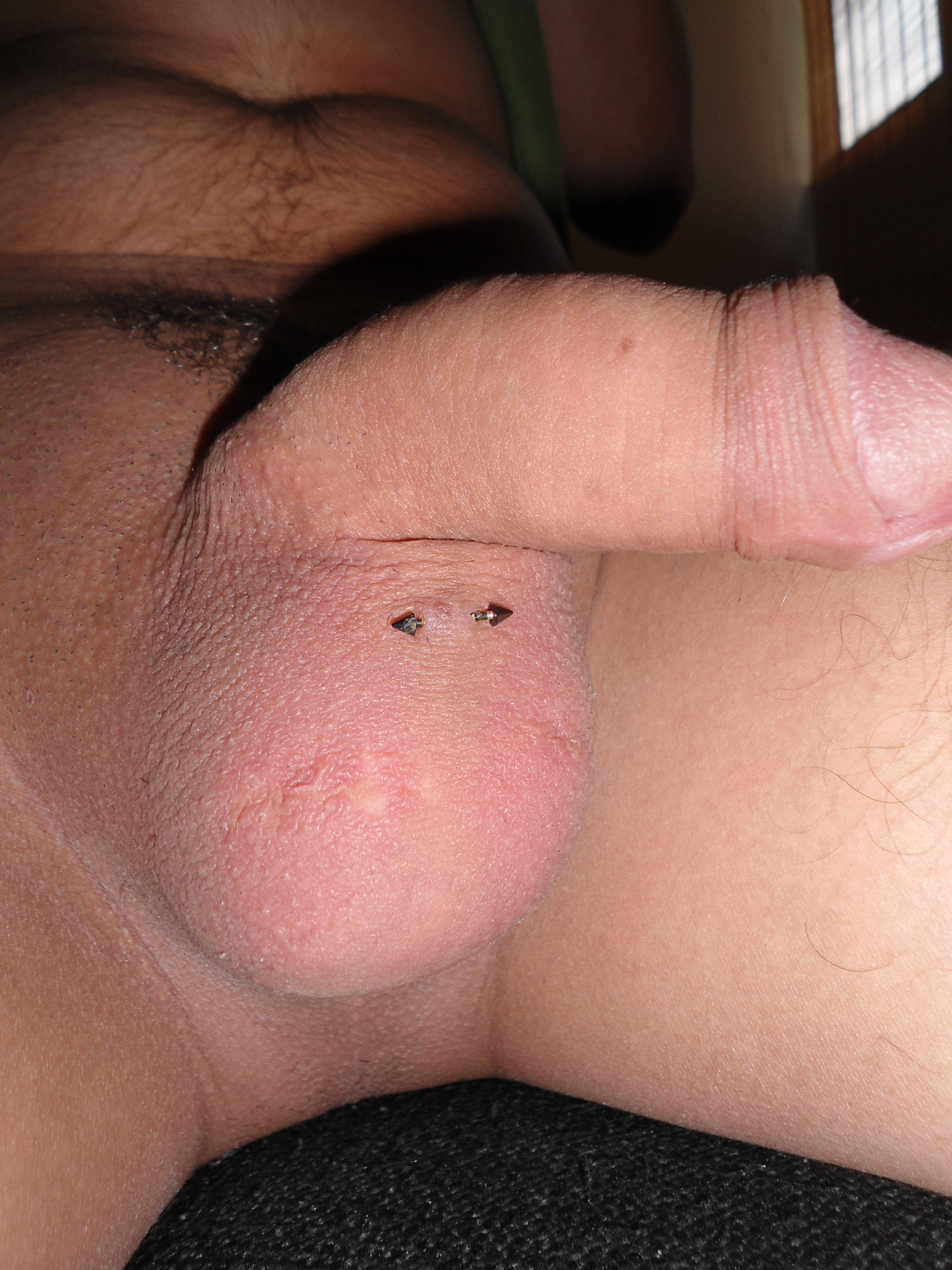
Single spiked barbell (click to enlarge)

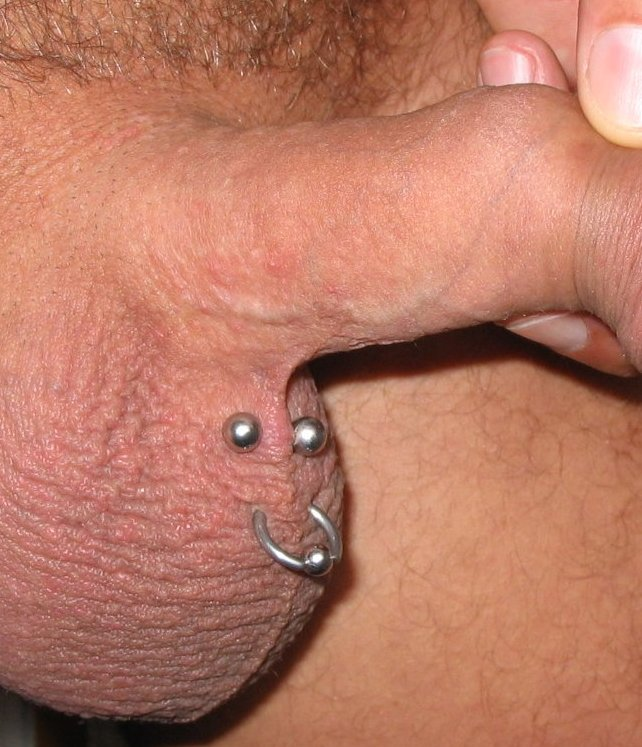
Piercing with one bananabell and one BCR

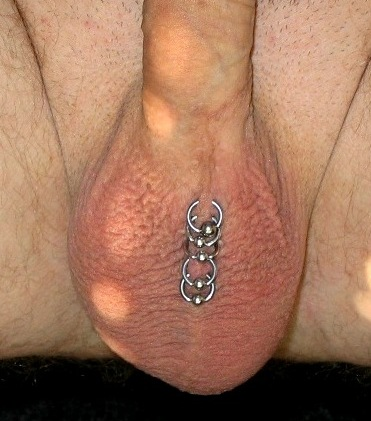
Scrotal ladder along midline or "seam" of scrotum, using BCRs

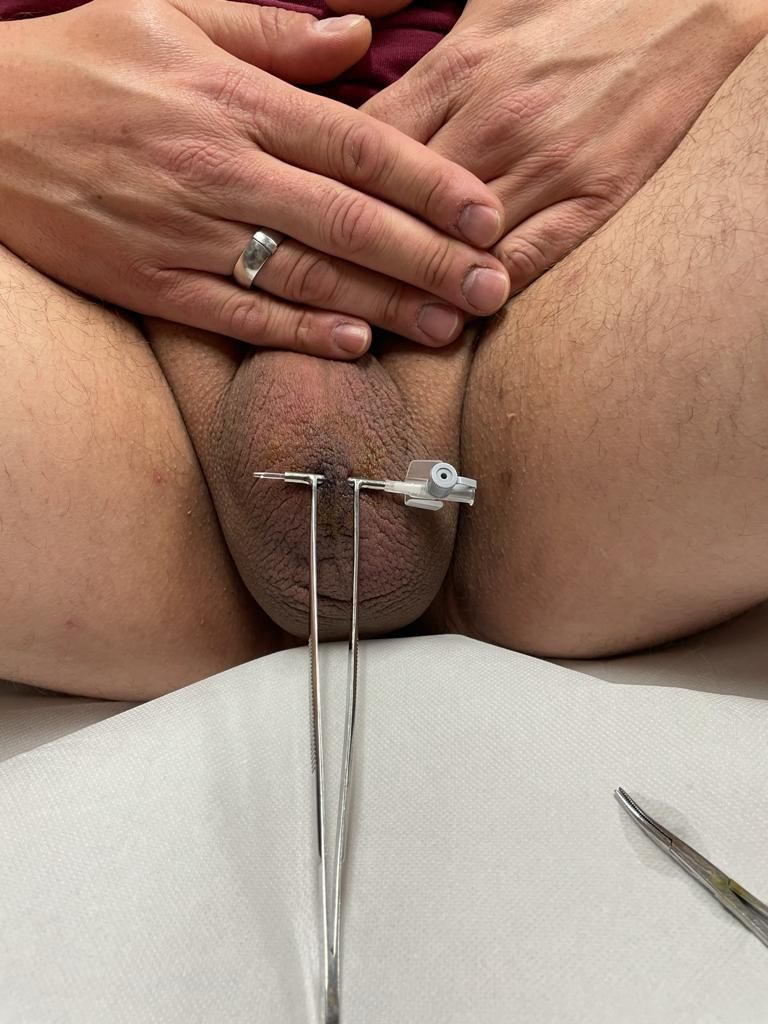
Piercing instrument

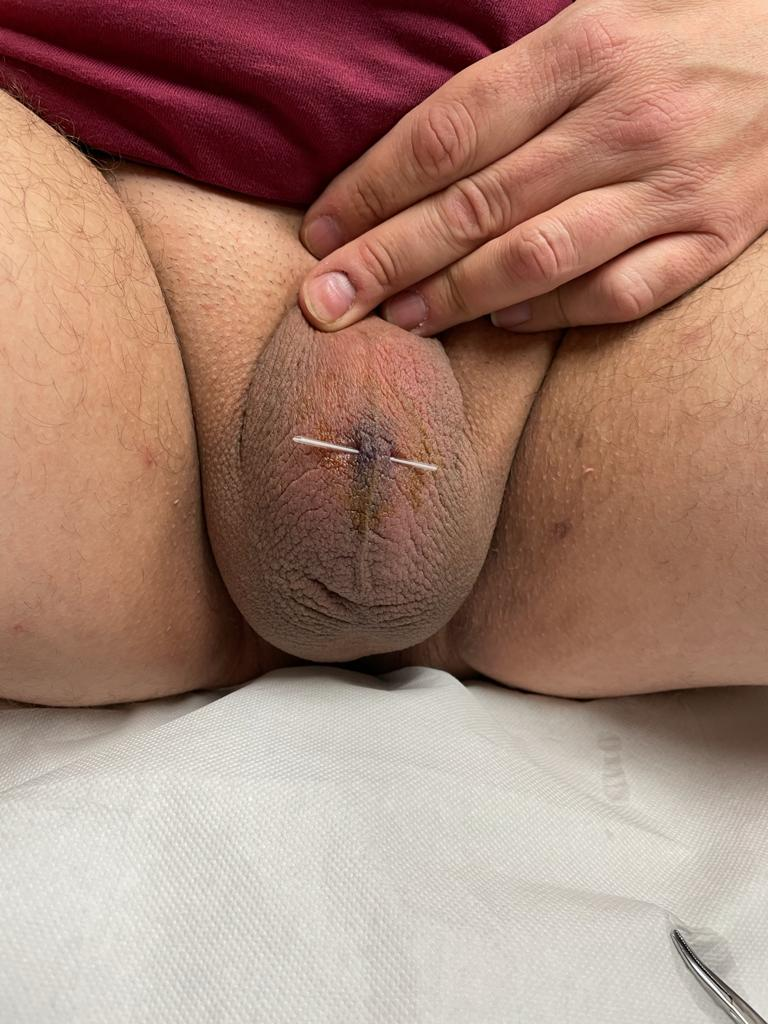
PTFE rod used after piercing, before jewelry

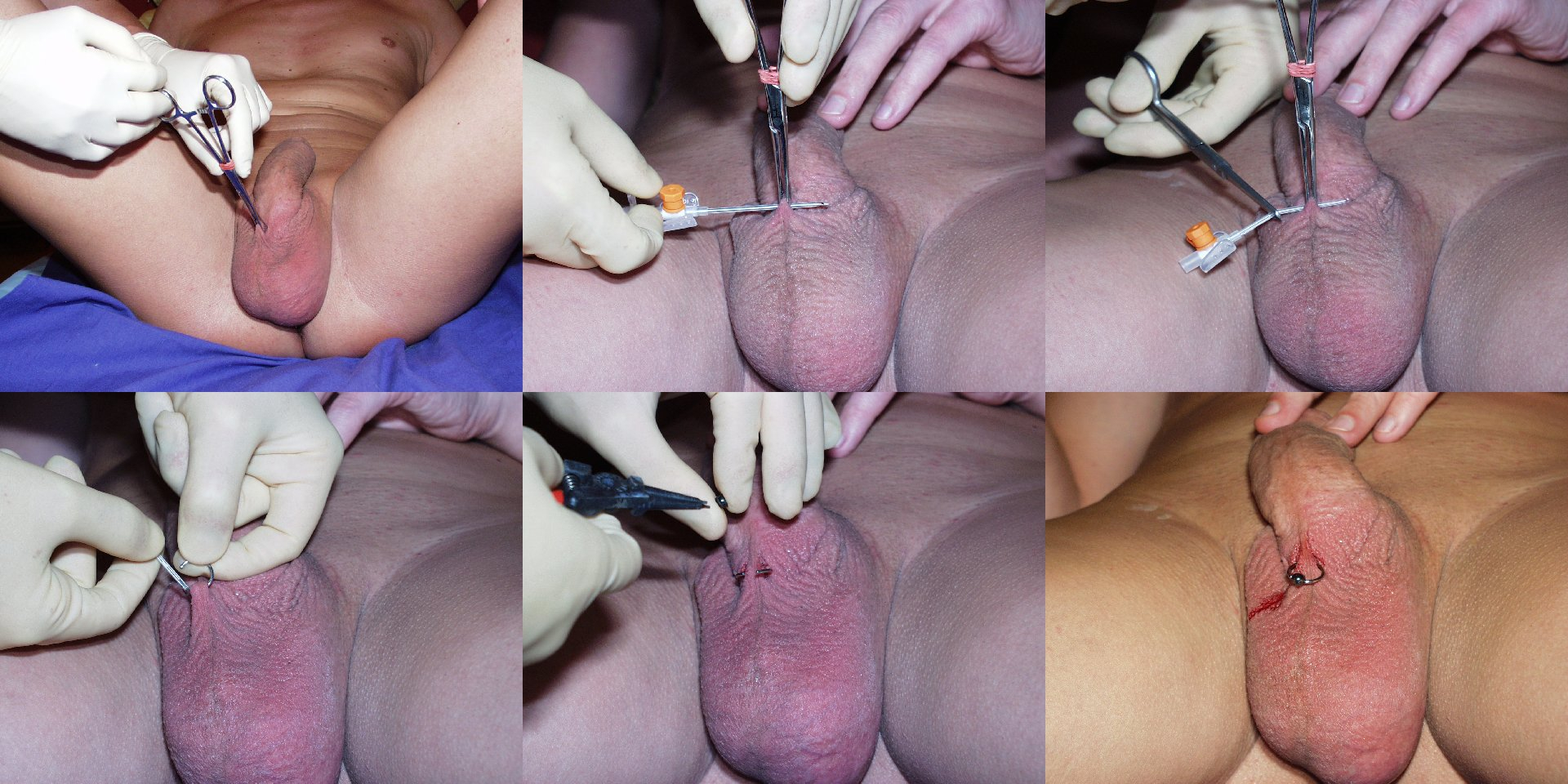
Hafada piercing procedure

== See also ==
- Lorum (piercing)
- Genital piercing
- Pubic piercing
