= Genital frenectomy =

Genital frenectomy is a frenectomy (removal of a frenulum) performed on genital tissue, and may refer to:

- Frenulum of labia minora (may be termed "labia frenectomy")
- Frenulum of prepuce of penis (may be termed "penis frenectomy")
