= Frenulum breve =

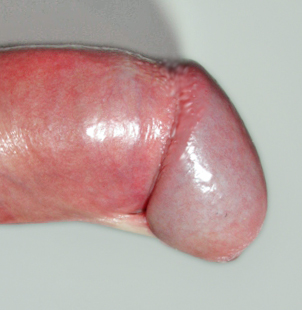
- Specialty: Urology

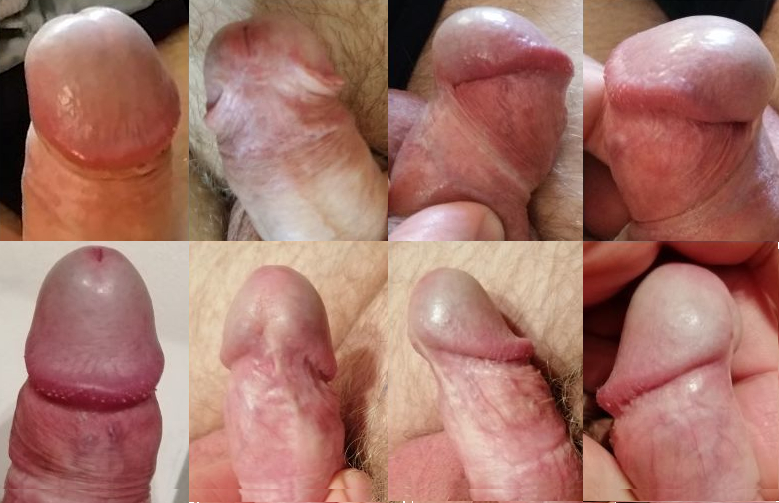
Before (above) and after (below) frenuloplasty

Frenulum breve or short frenulum, is a condition in which the frenulum of the penis, which is an elastic band of tissue under the glans penis that connects to the foreskin and helps contract it over the glans, is too short and thus restricts the movement of the foreskin. The frenulum should normally be sufficiently long and supple to allow for the full retraction of the foreskin so that it lies smoothly back on the shaft of the erect penis.

The penile frenulum is comparable to the tongue's frenulum between the tongue's lower surface and the lower jaw, or the frenulum between the upper lip and the outside of the upper gum.

== Symptoms and signs ==
A frenulum breve leads to ventral deviation of the glans and pain during erection. Sometimes, tearing of the frenulum causes heavy bleeding. The tearing of frenulum breve occurs particularly during sexual activity of young men.

Frenulum breve may be complicated by tearing of the frenulum during sexual or other activity and is a cause of dyspareunia. The torn frenulum may result in healing with scar tissue that is less flexible after the incident causing further difficulties. However, this tearing can also solve the problem, healing such that the frenulum is longer and therefore no longer problematic.

A short frenulum can present in various grades of severity, and its diagnosis may depend on the subjective criteria of evaluation at physical examination in a medical office as there is no standard definition. Frenulum restricts the movement of the prepuce, even when not causing obvious phimosis. When the foreskin is completely retracted over the glans, a short frenulum tugs down the glans. One study arbitrarily defined a "short frenulum" as that which causes a ventral curvature of the glans major of 20° or more upon gentle retraction of the foreskin in the clinic. Short frenulum in this study was a common cause of premature ejaculation, and frenuloplasty significantly improved the ejaculation latency. Short frenulum may be more sensitive in subjects with premature ejaculation. Also, due to the limitation of the length of frenulum, and for the fear of pain, the strokes during sexual intercourse may be shorter, but faster, thus leading to early ejaculation.

Severe frenulum breve when associated with significant difficulty during sexual intercourse may lead to erroneous labelling of the sufferer as having psychosexual problems.

== Diagnosis ==
The diagnosis of severe frenulum breve is almost always confused with that of phimosis and a generally tight foreskin, since the symptom is difficulty retracting the foreskin. Most men with phimosis also have frenulum breve to a certain extent. A milder frenulum breve may go unrecognized, since foreskin may retract over the glans variably.

== Treatment ==
The condition may be treated with stretching exercises and steroid creams. It also may be treated with surgery. There are several different techniques to treat this condition. Threading a suture through the lower membrane, and then tying a tight knot around the frenulum itself is a procedure that minimises invasive action. After a few days the frenulum will weaken and eventually break apart to allow the prepuce to fully retract. Other procedures involve the cutting of the skin and require the use of sutures to help in the healing process. Alternatively, it may be treated by a reparative plastic surgery operation called a frenuloplasty, or by complete circumcision including resection of the frenulum (frenectomy). An alternative method that does not require stitches (sutures) is the "pull and burn" method, where high-frequency electrical current is used to destroy the short and tight frenulum. This method may circumvent common complications such as frenular artery ligation and subsequent stenosis of the urethral meatus or creation of skin tags and suture remnants that create a poor cosmetic result.

== Etymology ==
The word "frenulum" is a diminutive of the Latin word frenum, which means "bridle". Breve is Latin neutral for "short".
