= Frenulum =

Small fold of tissue that secures or restricts the motion of a mobile organ in the body

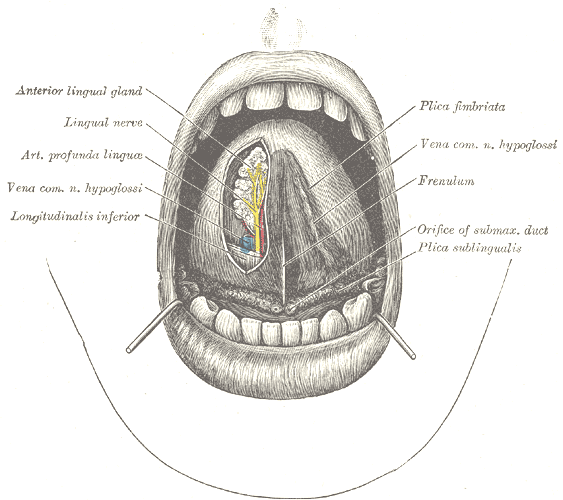
Anatomy of the human mouth, including the frenulum of the tongue

A frenulum (/ˈfrɛnjələm/; from Latin frēnulum 'little bridle', the diminutive of frēnum; pl. frenula), also called a frenum (/ˈfriːnəm/; pl. frena), is a small fold of tissue that secures the motion of a mobile organ in the body.

== In human anatomy ==
Frenula on the human body include several in the mouth, some in the digestive tract, and some connected to the external genitalia.

- Brain: Frenulum of superior medullary velum or frenulum veli
- Digestive tract: frenulum valvae ileocaecalis
- Oral tissue: Frenula of the mouth include the frenulum of the tongue or frenulum linguae under the tongue, the frenulum labii superioris inside the upper lip, the frenulum labii inferioris inside the lower lip, and the buccal frena which connect the cheeks to the gum. These can easily be torn by violent blows to the face or mouth, thus a torn frenulum is sometimes a warning sign of physical abuse.
- Penile tissue: The word frenulum on its own is often used for the penile frenulum or frenulum preputii penis, which is a sensitive, elastic band of tissue that connects the prepuce or foreskin to the glans penis and helps contract the prepuce over the glans. In most forms of circumcision, this part of the penis is partially or entirely removed.
- Vulvar tissue: In females, genital frenula include the frenulum clitoridis of the clitoris and the frenulum labiorum pudendi (fourchette) where the labia minora meet at the back.

An overly short oral or genital frenulum may require a frenulectomy or frenuloplasty to achieve normal mobility.

== In insects ==
The word frenulum also refers to a bristle present at the root of the hindwing of most moths which engages with a small hook or tuft on the forewing (the retinaculum) to join the wings together.

== See also ==
- Frenectomy – surgical removal of frenula
- Frenuloplasty – surgical alterations of frenula
- Frenulum breve
- Frenulum veli

=== Piercings ===
- Frenum piercing
- Lip frenulum piercing
- Tongue frenulum piercing
