= Guiche piercing =

Body piercing through the perineum

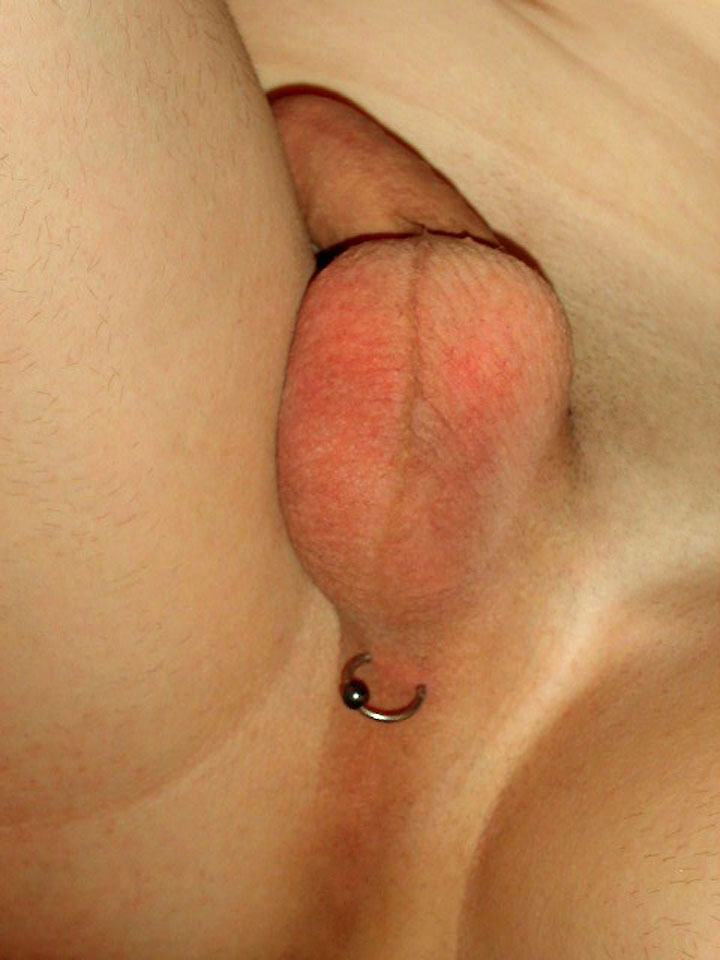
- Location: Perineum
- Jewelry: Captive bead ring (shown), barbell

A guiche piercing is a body piercing through the perineum. Guiche piercings are much more common in men than in women. Although a guiche normally runs perpendicular to the direction of the penis, lateral placements are possible.

An anal piercing is placed in the surrounding area of the human anus, usually the perineum.

== Health issues ==
Depending on the anatomy of the individual, a guiche piercing can heal quickly with few complications, like a normal piercing, or it may require specialized initial jewelry and care, like a surface piercing. Due to the proximity to the anus, good hygiene is important both during the initial healing period, and on an ongoing basis after the piercing is healed. The estimated healing time for a guiche piercing is between 6 and 9 months. Sitting-related activities that place stress on the region may cause irritation to the site leading to the migration or rejection of the piercing.

Despite the name, piercing of the anal sphincter itself is rather rare, because even once the wound canal has healed, piercings through a functioning muscle in as sensitive an area as the anus tend to remain painful and prone to tearing. A new piercing in this area is difficult to keep safe from infection, because of the constant presence of fecal matter.

== Jewelry ==
Both captive bead rings and barbell-style jewelry are worn in guiche piercings, both as initial jewelry as well as after the piercing has healed. Guiche weights may be attached to the piercing, causing added sexual stimulation.

== Gallery ==
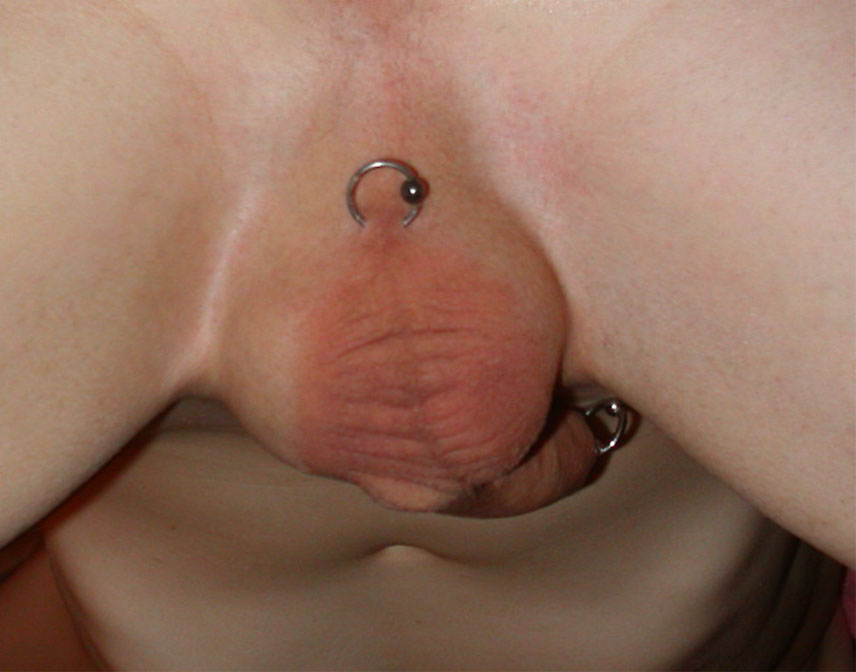
Guiche piercing (in foreground) with single captive bead ring

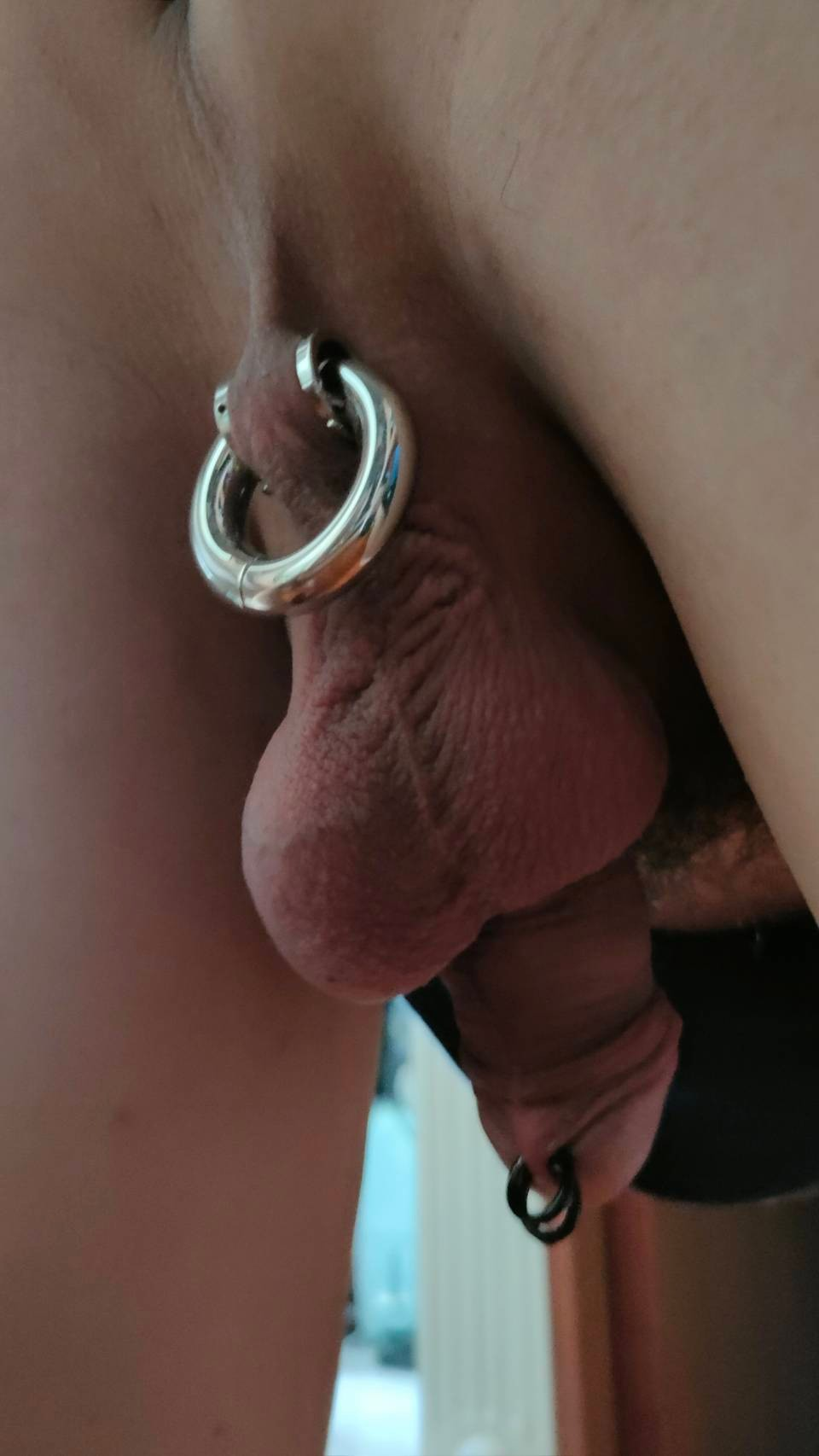

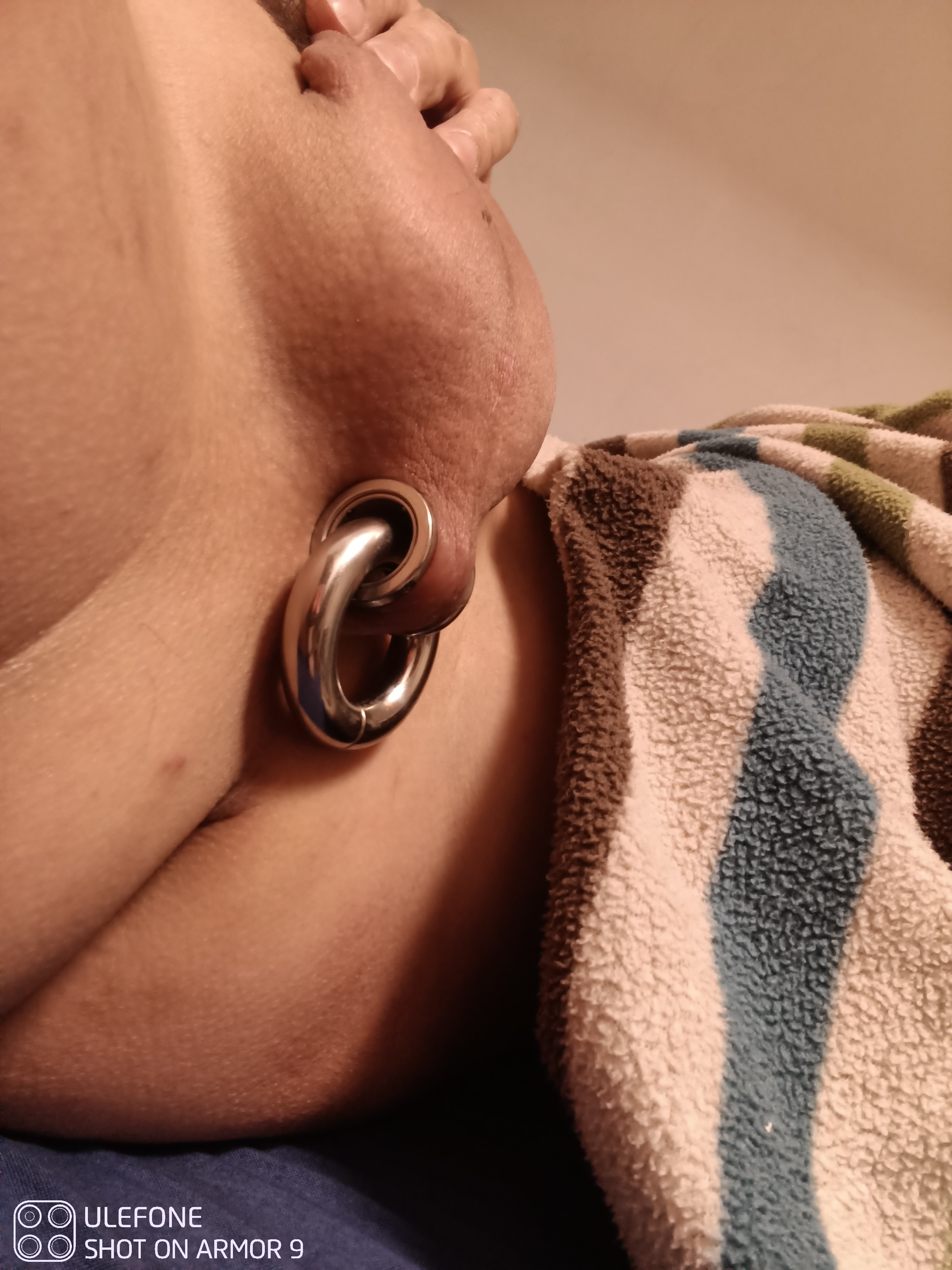

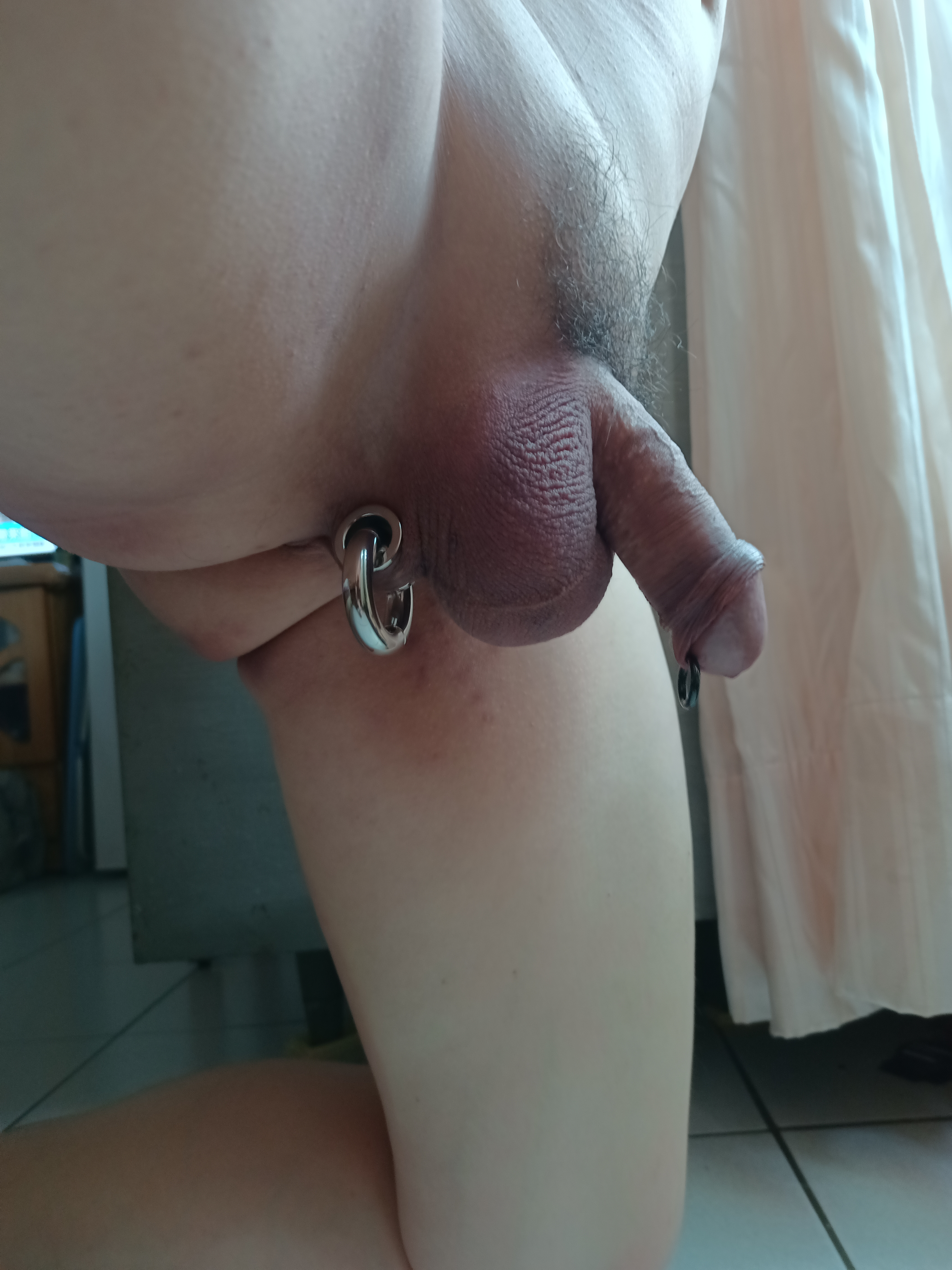

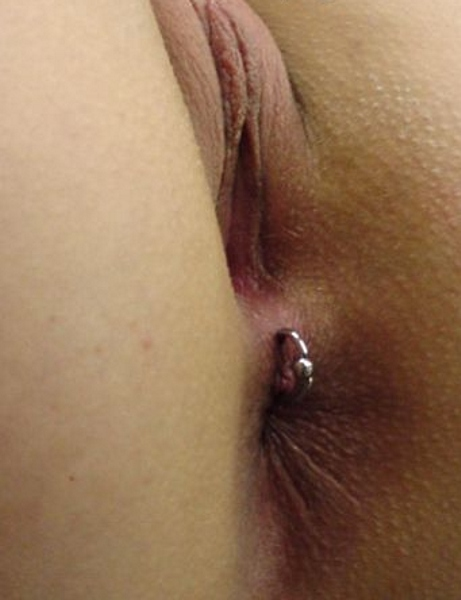

== See also ==
- Chastity piercing
- Hafada piercing
