= Frenuloplasty =

Surgical procedure

Frenuloplasty is the surgical alteration of a frenulum when its presence restricts range of motion between interconnected tissues. Two of the common sites for a frenuloplasty are:

- Frenuloplasty of tongue
- Frenuloplasty of prepuce of penis
