= Penile frenulum =

Band of tissue on the underside of the glans penis

Frenulum of the penis
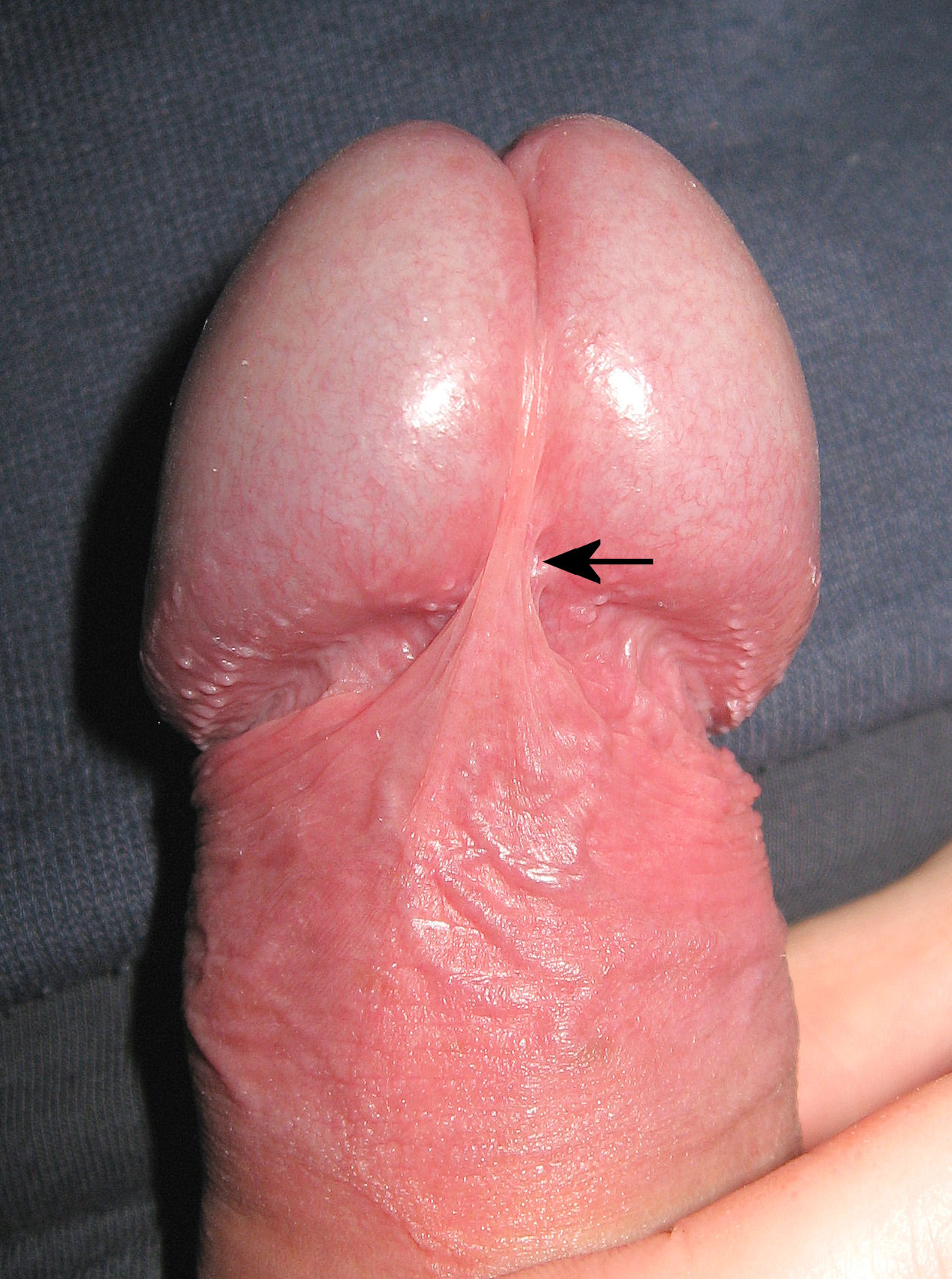

Details
- System: Male reproductive system
- Artery: Dorsal artery of the penis
- Vein: Dorsal veins of the penis
- Nerve: Dorsal nerve of the penis

Identifiers
- Latin: frenulum preputii penis
- TA98: A09.4.01.012
- TA2: 3676
- FMA: 19647

The frenulum of the penis, often known simply as the frenulum (from Latin: frēnulum, lit. 'little bridle') or frenum, is a thin elastic strip of tissue on the underside of the glans and the neck of the human penis. In men who are not circumcised, it also connects the foreskin to the glans. It helps retract the foreskin during erection.

The penile frenulum is homologous to the clitoral frenulum in the female. Similar folds of mucosa called frenula are found elsewhere in the body, such as the lingual frenulum and the labial frenula of the mouth.

In some men, the frenulum may appear shorter than normal, a phenomenon known as frenulum breve. A short frenulum can cause pain during erection or intercourse, and may tear and bleed. Treatment of frenulum breve may be non-surgical, or in other cases, especially with penile chordee, it may include incision of the frenulum, frenulectomy or frenulum lengthening.

== Structure ==
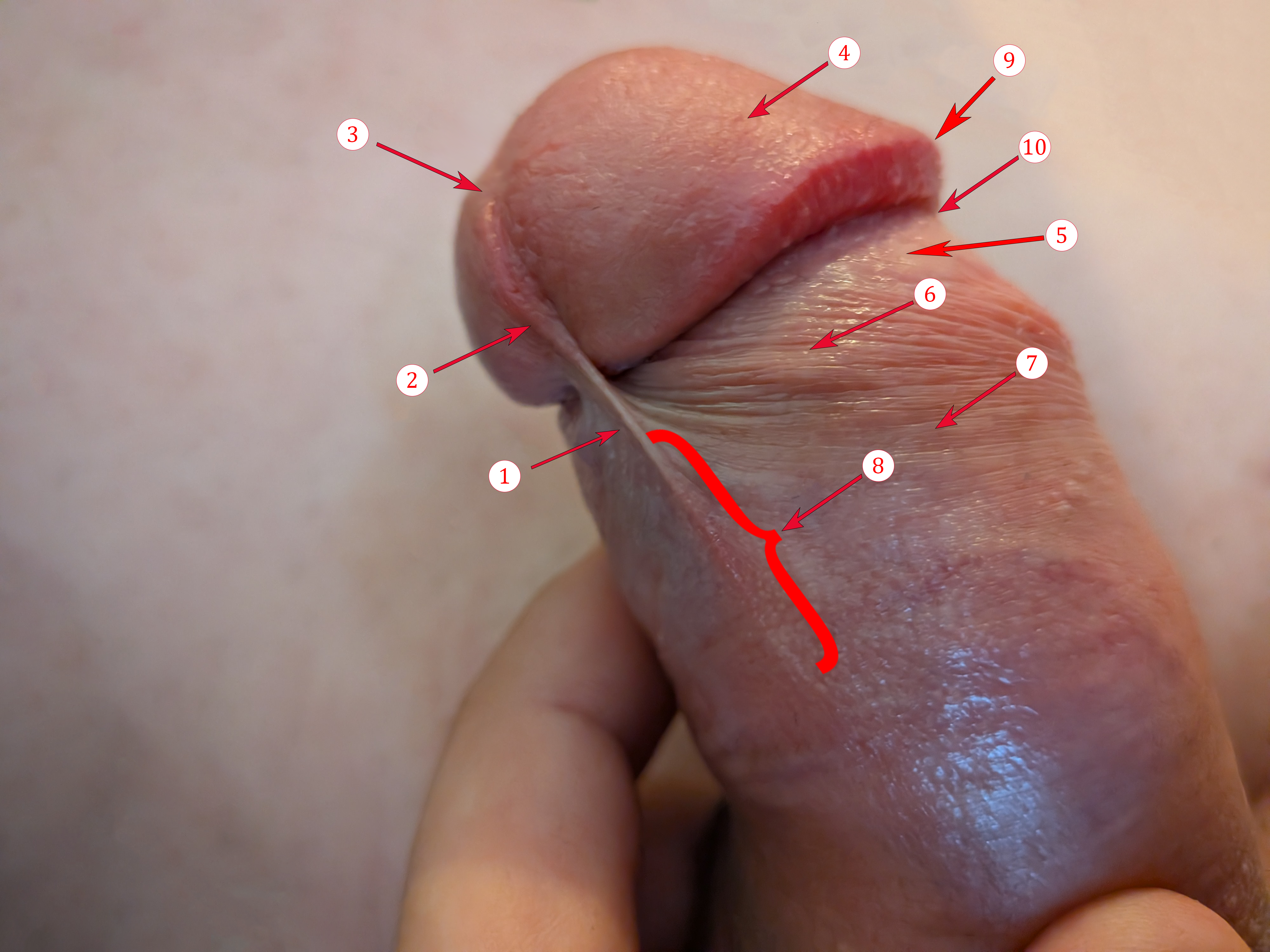
Labelled close-up of the frenulum. 1. Frenulum, intact; 2. attachment of the frenulum to the glans; 3. external urethral orifice; 4. glans; 5. inner foreskin (mucosa); 6. transition between inner and outer foreskin; 7. outer foreskin (dermis); 8. raphe; 9. corona and coronal sulcus; 10. neck of the penis.

The frenulum is a strip of mucosal tissue on the ventral side of the glans and the neck of the penis. During gestation, it forms as the lateral edges of the preputial lamina approach in the ventral midline. The two sides of the lamina do not fuse in the midline but remain separated by a thin septum of mesenchyme that will create the preputial frenulum. As part of the glans penis, the frenulum is innervated by divisions of the pudendal nerve; the dorsal nerve of the penis and a branch of the perineal nerve. Blood supply to the frenulum is provided by branches of the dorsal artery of the penis that curve around each side of the neck to enter the frenulum and the glans from its ventral surface. It is uncertain whether the frenular artery is single or paired. Venous drainage is thought to occur around the neck of the penis from smaller paired venules. The frenulum occurs on the ventral midline of the glans, where the two glans wings meet without fusing, separated by the septum glandis.

== Research ==
The role of the frenulum in penile erection has been studied in cases of men with short frenula and premature ejaculation. In small case series, lengthening or reconstruction of the frenulum in uncircumcised and circumcised men was reported to give positive results in satisfied intercourse, prolonged erection and time of ejaculation.

Most men with complete spinal cord injuries do not ejaculate during intercourse. In quadriplegic men, vibratory stimulation applied to the frenulum has been used to produce ejaculation for intrauterine insemination.

== Clinical significance ==
Frenulum breve is a condition in which the frenulum is short and restricts the movement of the foreskin, which may or may not interfere with normal sexual activity. Frenulum breve may also contribute to frenular chordee, where the glans is pulled toward the ventral body of the penis. The condition can be treated with surgical and non surgical treatment. Non surgical treatment includes stretching exercises and steroid creams. Surgical treatment includes frenuloplasty (frenulum lengthening), incision of the frenulum, for example during circumcision, or frenectomy. A frenulum-sparing circumcision technique has also been described. Some patients needing surgical treatment for phimosis will opt for preputioplasty to preserve the foreskin.

It is possible for the frenulum to tear during sexual activities. This type of injury usually heals by itself. A tear can be very painful and bleed heavily. A short frenulum is more prone to tearing.

In hypospadias, the frenulum and the septum glandis are entirely missing.

== Frenectomy and frenuloplasty ==
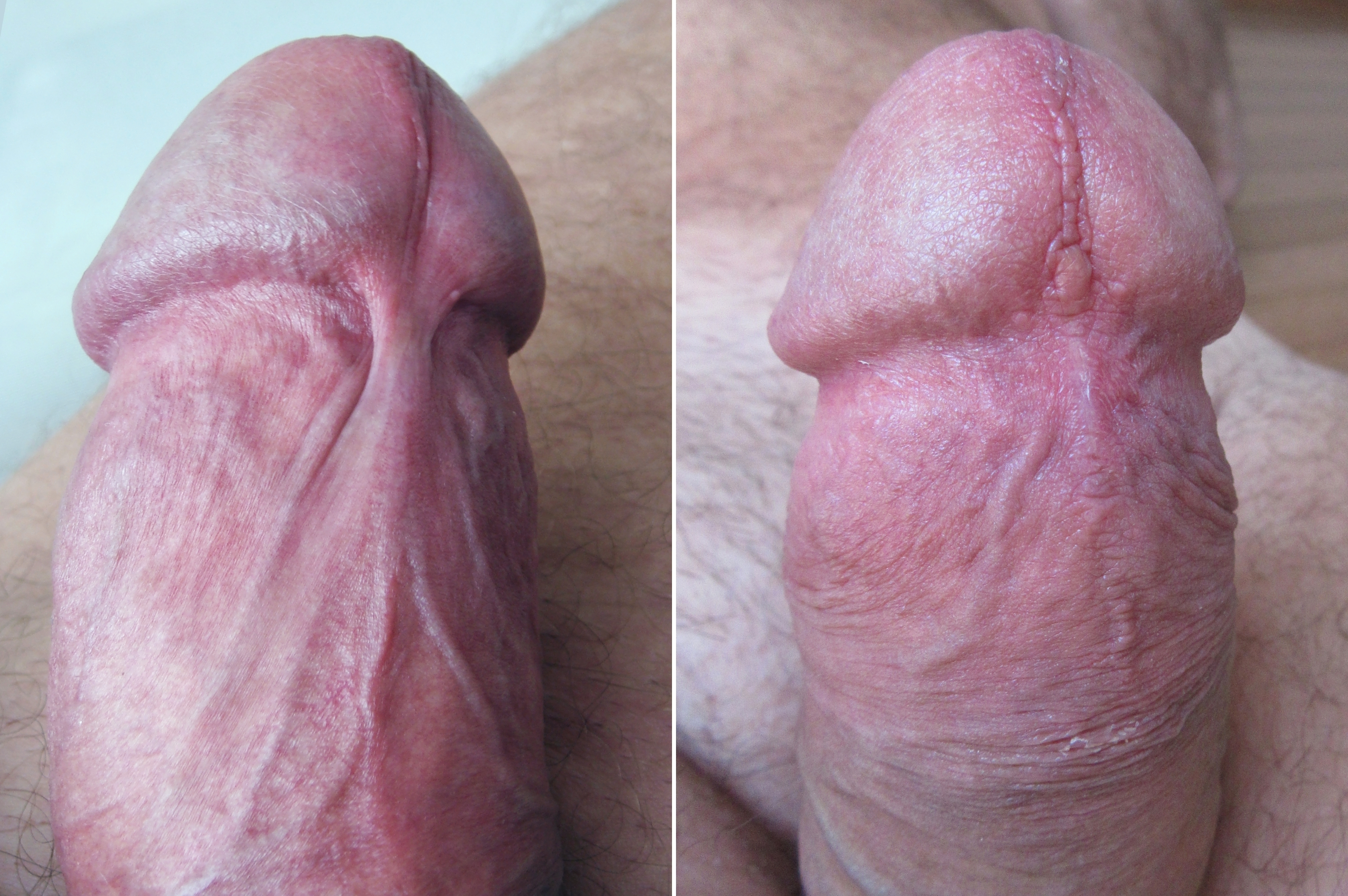
Penis before (left) and after (right) frenulectomy

As a treatment for frenulum breve or frenular chordee, a frenectomy or frenulectomy can be performed to excise the frenulum from the penis. This is a form of genital frenectomy. A less invasive treatment which often retains the natural appearance and function of the frenulum to some degree is a frenuloplasty or frenulum lengthening. This procedure involves dividing the frenulum transversely and stitching it lengthwise, which makes it longer.

== See also ==
- Frenuloplasty of prepuce of penis
- Frenum piercing
- Perineal raphe
