= Breath: The New Science of a Lost Art =

2020 book by James Nestor

- Author: James Nestor
- Audio read by: James Nestor
- Language: English
- Subject: Breathing
- Publisher: Riverhead Books
- Publication date: May 26, 2020
- Publication place: United States
- Media type: Print (hardcover)
- Pages: 304
- ISBN: 978-0-7352-1361-6
- OCLC: 1138996691
- Dewey Decimal: 613/.192
- LC Class: RA782 .N47 2020

Breath: The New Science of a Lost Art is a 2020 popular science book by science journalist James Nestor. The book provides a historical, scientific and personal examination of breathing, with a specific interest in contrasting the differences between mouth breathing and nasal breathing. The book became an international bestseller, selling over two million copies worldwide.

== Summary ==
The book examines the history, science, and culture of breathing and its impacts on human health. It investigates the history of how humans shifted from the natural state of nasal breathing to chronic mouth breathing. Nestor explores research that argues that this shift (due to the increased consumption of processed foods) has led to a rise in snoring, sleep apnea, asthma, autoimmune disease, and allergies. It includes Nestor's first-person experiences with breathing. He also worked with scientists at Stanford University whose research suggests that returning to a state of nasal breathing will improve an individual's health. Nestor wrote the book after ten years of researching the subject.

== Publication and promotion ==
Breath was published by Riverhead Books on May 26, 2020. Nestor promoted the book with appearances on The Joe Rogan Experience and CBS This Morning.

The book debuted at number seven on The New York Times nonfiction best-seller list for the week ending May 30, 2020. It spent 18 weeks on The New York Times nonfiction best-seller list in the first year of publication and was a bestseller in Germany, Spain, Croatia, Italy, and the UK. By February 2022, the book had sold over a million copies. As of April 2023, Breath has sold over two million copies worldwide and by 2022 had been translated into more than 35 languages.

== Reception ==
Breath won the award for Best General Nonfiction Book of 2020 by the American Society of Journalists and Authors and was a finalist for the Royal Society Science Book Prize of 2021.

Kirkus Reviews called the book a "welcome, invigorating user's manual for the respiratory system." Publishers Weekly called it a "fascinating treatise" on breathing. Stuart Miller of The Boston Globe wrote that Nestor succeeded at "explaining both the basics" and the "more complicated aspects of breathing properly." In her review for the Evening Standard, Katie Law compared Breath to the "potentially life-changing books" including Matthew Walker's Why We Sleep, Shane O'Mara's In Praise of Walking, and Norman Doidge's The Brain's Way of Healing. Breath also received a favorable review by Library Journal.

Writing for The Wall Street Journal, Sam Kean praised the book's "good foundation" but criticized Nestor for not exercising enough skepticism and investigating the placebo effect further. Kean also felt the book contained "dicey" evidence which reminded him of Linus Pauling's vitamin C advocacy. Kean expressed a "similar skepticism" about Nestor's claims regarding the benefits of ancient breathing exercises. Writing in The Spectator, psychiatrist Kate Womersley characterised Breath as a "playful and optimistic" book for its insightful blend of science, self-experimentation, and ancient techniques. Womersley, however, concluded that Nestor relies too heavily on anecedotal evidence and makes overstated claims regarding several supposed health benefits of elevated nitric oxide levels from nose breathing and increased concentrations of CO_{2}, the details of which she noted are vague. She also criticized Nestor for walking back earlier claims in the book's epilogue. Womersley concluded her review by expressing skepticism about interfering with an automatic bodily function, over-intervention in which she suggests could lead to neurosis; she also warned of "enhanced breathing" practices becoming a commercialized self-optimization trend.

The book was also perceived as being unexpectedly resonant due to its publication occurring amid the COVID-19 pandemic.

== See also ==
- Breathwork (New Age)
- George Catlin
- Nitric oxide
- Obligate nasal breathing
