= James Nestor =

American journalist

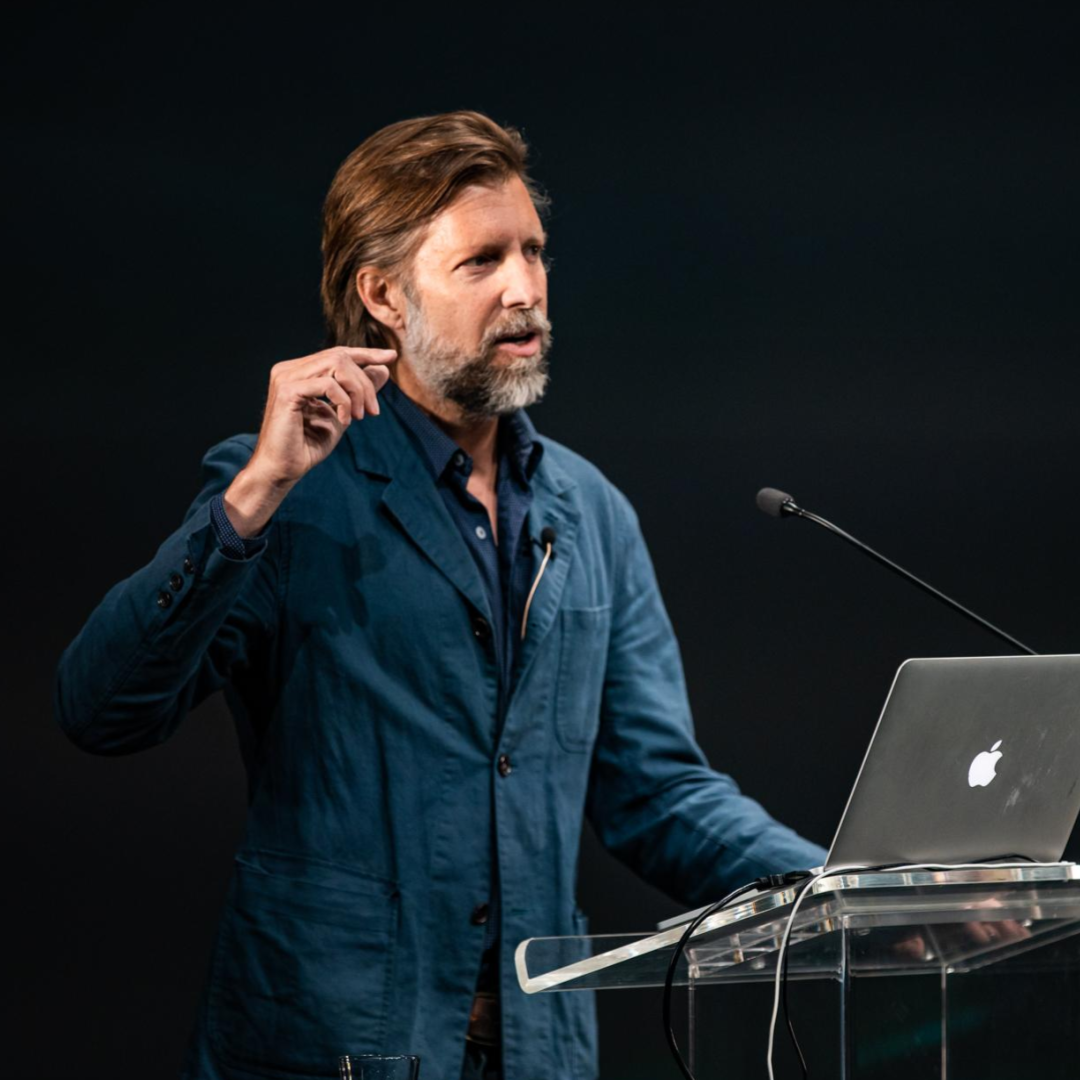
- Nestor in 2021
- Born: Tustin, California, US
- Occupations: Science journalist Sports journalist
- Writing career
- Genre: Nonfiction
- Notable works: Breath (2020); Deep (2014)
- Website: www.mrjamesnestor.com

James Nestor is an American author and journalist who has written for Outside, Scientific American, Dwell, National Public Radio, The New York Times, The Atlantic, Men's Journal, the San Francisco Chronicle Magazine, and others. His 2020 nonfiction book, Breath: The New Science of a Lost Art, was an international bestseller, debuting on The Wall Street Journal and Los Angeles Times bestseller lists and spending 18 weeks on the New York Times Best Sellers in its first year of release. Breath won the award for Best General Nonfiction Book of 2020 by the American Society of Journalists and Authors and was a finalist for the Royal Society Science Book Prize. Breath was translated into more than 35 languages in 2022.

== Early life ==
Nestor was born in Tustin, California, a suburb in Orange County. He described his upbringing as "lower-upper-middle class." Nestor was the younger of two siblings. His father was a US Air Force pilot and instructor who later worked as an electrical engineer for navigational equipment of nuclear submarines. His mother was a homemaker. Nestor recounted the culture of the suburbs of southern California as being "the opposite of hippy, peace, dream catchers, flip-flops, and all that."

At 14, Nestor formed a straight edge punk rock band with neighboring boys inspired by the burgeoning music scene of Orange County in the 1980s. He played a three-quarters-scale South Korean-made Cort bass guitar that his brother had bought at a thrift store but never used. The band was called Care Unit. The band released a self-produced demo cassette tape and appeared on the compilation record album, "Another Shot for Bracken" (Positive Force Records). After 18 years living in Tustin in the same house with "the same phone number, the same phone," Nestor moved to northern California to study literature and art, eventually earning a Master of Arts in English and a minor in art history at a university he described as "not really worth mentioning."

== Career ==
Nestor has written essays and feature articles for Outside, Scientific American, Dwell, National Public Radio, The New York Times, The Atlantic, Men's Journal, Surfer's Journal, BBC, Reader's Digest, the San Francisco Chronicle Magazine, and others.

Although Nestor writes primarily about science, focusing on the human body's potential, he never intended on making journalism his career. He began his professional life as a copywriter for the Kimpton Hotel and Restaurant Group in San Francisco. He later directed copy and editorial projects for NextMonet, a San Francisco-based startup that sold fine art online. He directed special projects at Limn Gallery, including the Limn Almanac and The City in China.

In the early 2000s, Nestor became copywriter for a federally funded education policy non-profit foundation. Nestor described working at this agency as "the most Kafkaesque existence"; during this time he took an interest in magazine journalism.

He began pitching culture and science stories to newspapers and magazines, all of which were "unanimously and unceremoniously ignored," until acquiring a speculative assignment for the San Francisco Chronicle Magazine on the subculture of the auxiliary language of Esperanto. Several cover stories followed including an article on big wave surfing miles off the coast of San Francisco and another cover story about a group of auto mechanics who collected used cooking oil from restaurants and used it as fuel for antique Mercedes-Benz cars. During this time he became a regular contributor to Dwell magazine and a columnist for ReadyMade.

Nestor continued working a full-time job for several years while writing during nights and weekends. "It was pure joy to take my time with these subjects, working alongside experts in the field, having strange new revelations about the world and our place in it, separating science from myths. It's all I thought about, all I ever wanted to do. Still is."

From 2008 to 2018, Nestor became a member of The San Francisco Writers' Grotto, a private community of working writers that included bestselling authors Mary Roach, Po Bronson, Julia Scheeres, Caroline Paul, Ethan Watters, Matthew Zapruder, and several others. Being surrounded by other writers "who actually worked, some even seemed to almost make a living at it." inspired Nestor to quit his full time job to become a freelance magazine journalist. During that time, Outside sent Nestor to the Arctic Circle in Norway for a month with a group of professional surfers in an attempt to surf never-before-ridden waves. The story, "Tasty Freeze," was published on January 5, 2010, and was nominated for the Best American Sports Writing of 2011.

Nine months later, in 2011, Nestor was sent to Kalamata, Greece by Outside to report on an international freediving competition. Nestor described the experience "like a new birthday" for his career and life. It was there that he first saw how these athletes could use their breath to dive hundreds of feet below the water's surface, as well as heat themselves and, allegedly, heal themselves of chronic conditions. "I couldn't help wondering how many wondrous abilities and skills we, as a species, had lost and were losing sitting around in offices all day," he said. Nestor vowed to spend the rest of his life researching the science behind the human body's lost potential, and how to get it back.

The freediving story, Open Your Mouth and You're Dead, was released on January 25, 2012, and generated interest from book publishers. Within a week of the article's publication Nestor sold a book proposal at auction to Eamon Dolan at Houghton Mifflin Harcourt.

By 2014, Nestor had published his first nonfiction book focused on the human connection to the ocean—mammalian diving reflex, electroreception, magnetoreception, abiogenesis. The book, Deep: Freediving, Renegade Science, and What the Ocean Tells Us about Ourselves, was released on June 24, 2014, and won several awards. Deep has been published in seven languages.

In 2017, Nestor began working with National Geographic Explorer and marine scientist David Gruber to research and try to understand cetacean communication. Project CETI (Cetacean Translation Initiative) was launched three years later. It is a nonprofit research group that develops and employs technologies such as machine learning and Artificial Intelligence in the hopes of one day cracking interspecies communication. Project CETI was accepted as a TED Audacious Project in June 2020. Nestor's TEDx Marin talk about the inception of the project, "Deep Dive: What we are learning from the language of whales," has been viewed more than 278,000 times.

Nestor's follow-up book to Deep was Breath: The New Science of a Lost Art, released on May 26, 2020. Breath became an instant international bestseller and won several awards. Within a year of publication Breath sold more than a million copies worldwide.

Nestor has appeared on Fresh Air with Terry Gross, the Joe Rogan Show, ABC's Nightline, CBS Morning News, Bulletproof, Coast to Coast AM, BBC World, and dozens of NPR programs. He has been invited to speak at Stanford University School of Medicine, Harvard Medical School, Yale School of Medicine, the United Nations, and The Global Classroom, a charity and education organization delivered by Scarisbrick Hall School in partnership with the World Health Organization (WHO) and supported by UNICEF, which is the "largest digital classroom in the world."

He lives in San Francisco.

== Works ==
- Nestor, James (September 9, 2009). Get High Now (without drugs). Chronicle Books. ISBN 978-0-8118-6713-9.
- Nestor, James (May 12, 2015). The Role of Fiction. Tate Publishing & Enterprises, LLC. ISBN 978-1-63122-722-6.

=== Deep (2014) ===
Nestor's science/adventure book, DEEP: Freediving, Renegade Science, and What the Ocean Tells Us about Ourselves was released on June 24, 2014. It was a finalist for the "2015 PEN/ESPN Award for Literary Sports Writing." DEEP was also a BBC Radio 4 Book of the Week, one of BuzzFeed's 19 Best Non-Fiction Books of 2014, an Amazon Best Science Book of 2014, ArtForum Top 10 Book of 2014, New York Times Book Review Editor's Choice, Scientific American Recommended Read, Christian Science Monitor Editor's Pick, and more. Deep has been published in more than seven languages.

=== The Click Effect (2016) ===
Nestor wrote and co-created the virtual reality experience, The Click Effect (with director Sandy Smolan). It was released by the New York Times and Within on April 18, 2016, and is about the efforts of two freelance freediving researchers attempting to understand the language of dolphins and whales. The Click Effect was an official selection of a number of film festivals including the Sundance Film Festival and the Tribeca Film Festival.

=== Breath (2020) ===
In May 2020, Nestor published Breath: The New Science of a Lost Art through Riverhead/Penguin Random House. The book explores how the human species has lost the ability to breathe properly, shifting from the natural state of nasal breathing to chronic mouth breathing. Nestor explores research that argues that this shift (due to the increased consumption of processed foods) has led to a rise in snoring, sleep apnea, asthma, autoimmune disease, and allergies. He also worked with scientists at Stanford University whose research suggests that returning to a state of nasal breathing and adopting other healthy breathing habits such as taking slow, deep breaths in a rhythmic pattern, will improve an individual's health.

In the June 14, 2020, edition of The New York Times (one week after its release), Breath ranked #7 in the "Combined Print & E-Book Nonfiction list." That same week, Breath was listed a bestseller in the The Wall Street Journal and Los Angeles Times. Breath spent 18 weeks on the New York Times bestseller list in Spain, Germany, Italy, and Croatia and has sold more than a million copies worldwide. Breath was translated into more than 35 languages, including Mongolian and Slovakian, in 2021 and 2022.

In May 2020, Breath was awarded the Best General Nonfiction Book of 2020 by the American Society of Journalists and Authors. In October 2021, Breath was listed as a finalist for the Royal Society Science Book Prize of 2021.
