= Tongue thrust =

Abnormal tongue tip behaviour in infants

Tongue thrust, also called reverse swallow or immature swallow, is a pseudo-pathological name for an adaptive lip seal mechanism, whereby normal nasal breathing or normal swallowing can occur. Tongue thrust can also be seen as an oral myofunctional disorder, a tongue muscle pattern that is perceived as clinically abnormal, in which the tongue protrudes anteriorly to seal the otherwise incompetent lips.

Tongue thrusting is seen during speech, swallowing or eating, and in order to close otherwise incompetent lips and anterior open bite. In normal suckling behavior, infants have their tongues positioned between their gum pads anteriorly resting on the lower lip, which facilitates infantile (i.e. visceral) swallowing pattern. As teeth start to erupt and solid foods are introduced, pharyngeal muscles, posterior tongue, and elevator muscles of the lower jaw play a role in the swallowing pattern. As the child's primary molars erupt, swallowing follows a somatic pattern characterized by the contact of the molars, tongue positioning behind the maxillary incisors, and relaxation of the perioral muscles. Atypical swallowing patterns can arise when there is a failure in the fore-mentioned normal maturation of swallowing.

There are thus two view-points regarding tongue thrusting behaviour that persists past the neonatal period.

1. Tongue thrusting is an adaptive means of closing an open (or incompetent) lip state, caused by a unique combination of anatomical reasons, or
2. Tongue thrusting is the cause or potentiator of an open or incompetent lip state, which resists efforts at behavioural change or clinical attempt at remedy.

In general, tongue thrusting is poorly understood. In particular it lacks consensus on many points of description, causality, effect or management.

== Types of tongue thrust ==
Both the general dental and speech pathologist classical views are that tongue thrusting causes both the dentofacial abnormality of anterior open bite, and the incompetent lip seal and swallowing and speech effects associated with tongue thrust.

In both professions, tongue thrust is represented as a behavioural disturbance which can be taught to be resisted. Such interventional therapy is represented to strongly assist orthodontic or speech pathologist efforts at resolution of both the speech and orthodontic effects of anterior open bite and the associated lip incompetence or both.

As with normal reflexes, at an early age, children have tongue thrust. For example, according to recent literature, as many as 67–95 percent of children 5–8 years old exhibit tongue thrust, which may professionally be represented as associated with or contributing to an orthodontic or speech problem – depending on the clinical bias of proposal. Up to the age of four years, as with the complex conversion of all simpler reflex events, there is a possibility that any observed child will normally outgrow tongue thrust as they transition to a fuller dentofacial development. However, if a tongue thrust pattern is retained beyond infancy, it can be seen through a lens of abnormality.

Types of tongue thrusting include:

Anterior thrust:

This is the most common type of tongue thrust. It is often associated with a low, forward tongue rest posture. Sometimes the tongue can be seen protruding beyond the lips at rest and/or during the swallow. Upper incisors can be extremely protruded and the lower incisors are pulled in by the lower lip. An anterior open bite is a common malocclusion associated with this type of tongue thrusting pattern, especially in the presence of lip incompetence. This type of thrust is most generally accompanied by a strong mentalis.

Unilateral thrust:

This occurs when the tongue pushes unilaterally to the side between the back teeth during the swallow. The bite can be characteristically open on that side.

Bilateral thrust:

This occurs when the tongue pushes between the back teeth on both sides during the swallow with the jaw partially open.

Sometimes, the only teeth that touch are the molars, with the bite completely open on both sides including the anterior teeth. A large tongue can also be noted. This is the most difficult thrust to correct.

== Causes ==
There is lack of good quality evidence regarding the causes of tongue thrusting. Factors that can contribute to tongue thrusting include macroglossia (enlarged tongue), thumb sucking, large tonsils, hereditary factors, ankyloglossia (tongue tie), and certain types of artificial nipples used in feeding infants. Also, allergies or nasal congestion can cause the tongue to lie low in the mouth because of breathing obstruction and contribute to tongue thrusting.

== Effects ==
Tongue extrusion is normal in infants.

Tongue thrusting can adversely affect the teeth and mouth. A person swallows from 1,200 to 2,000 times every 24 hours with about 4 pounds (1.8 kg) of pressure each time. If a person has tongue thrusting, this continuous pressure tends to force the teeth out of alignment. People who exhibit a tongue thrust often present with open bites; the force of the tongue against the teeth is an important factor in contributing to "bad bite" (malocclusion). Many orthodontists have completed dental treatment with what appeared to be good results, only to discover that the case relapsed because of the patient's tongue thrust. If the tongue is allowed to continue its pushing action against the teeth, it will continue to push the teeth forward and reverse the orthodontic work.

Malocclusion:

The link between atypical swallowing and dental malocclusion is controversial. While a study by Cleall (1965) found that 70% of adolescents with malocclusion exhibit tongue thrusting, Subtelny et al. (1964) reported this number as 42%.

Speech:

Speech may be affected by a tongue thrust swallowing pattern. Sounds such as /s/, /z/, /t/, /d/, /n/, and /l/ are produced by placing the tongue on the upper alveolar ridge, and therefore a tongue thrust may distort these sounds. However, evidence on the link between tongue thrusting and misarticulation of /s/ and /z/ sounds, also known as sigmatism or lisping, is controversial. A study by Fletcher et al. (1961) reported that two-thirds of children between 6 and 18 years with tongue thrusting showed sigmatism. On the other hand, there are other studies that found no significant difference between children with or without atypical swallowing in lisping.

Chewing and swallowing with dysfunctional muscle patterning (as in a tongue thrust) is not as effective as a normal chewing and swallowing motion.

== Treatment ==
Appliance therapy, and myofunctional therapeutic exercises are among the treatment options for tongue thrusting:

Management of non-nutritive sucking habits such as thumb-sucking as well as mouth breathing may correct tongue thrusting.

Tongue cribs and functional appliances can correct tongue thrusting by leading to a more posteriorly position of the tongue. Tongue spurs are also effective options in the treatment of tongue thrust which work by triggering pain when the tongue is positioned forward. Appliance therapy is most effective when used during growth and requires up to 6 months to resolve tongue thrusting and anterior open bite.

Myofunctional therapeutic exercises work by increasing the individual's awareness about the positioning of their tongue and aim to correct its positioning.

Overall, there is no good quality evidence in the literature regarding tongue thrusting.

== See also ==
- Orofacial myological disorders
