= Inhalation =

Flow of the respiratory current into an organism

Diagram showing inhalation

Inhalation (or inspiration) happens when air or other gases enter the lungs.

== Inhalation of air ==
Inhalation of air, as part of the cycle of breathing, is a vital process for all human life. The process is autonomic (though there are exceptions in some disease states) and does not need conscious control or effort. However, breathing can be consciously controlled or interrupted (within limits).

Breathing allows oxygen (which humans and a lot of other species need for survival) to enter the lungs, from where it can be absorbed into the bloodstream.

== Other substances – accidental ==
Examples of accidental inhalation includes inhalation of water (e.g. in drowning), smoke, food, vomitus and less common foreign substances (e.g. tooth fragments, coins, batteries, small toy parts, needles).

== Other substances – deliberate ==
=== Recreational use ===
Nitrous oxide ("laughing gas") has been used recreationally since 1899 for its ability to induce euphoria, hallucinogenic states and relaxation, and is legal in some countries.

Helium can be inhaled to give the voice a reedy, duck-like quality, but this can be dangerous as the gas is an asphyxiant and displaces the oxygen needed for normal respiration.

Various illegal gaseous, vapourised or aerosolized recreational drugs exist, and are classed as inhalants.

=== Medical use ===
==== Diagnostic ====
Various specialized investigations use the inhalation of known substances for diagnostic purposes. Examples include pulmonary function testing (e.g. nitrogen washout test, diffusion capacity testing (carbon monoxide, helium, methane)) and diagnostic radiology (e.g. radioactive xenon isotopes).

==== Therapeutic ====
Gases and other drugs used in anaesthesia include oxygen, nitrous oxide, helium, xenon, volatile anaesthetic agents. Medication for asthma, croup, cystic fibrosis and some other conditions.

== Mechanism ==
Inhalation begins with the contraction of the muscles attached to the rib cage; this causes an expansion in the chest cavity. Then takes place the onset of contraction of the thoracic diaphragm, which results in expansion of the intrapleural space and an increase in negative pressure according to Boyle's law. This negative pressure generates airflow because of the pressure difference between the atmosphere and alveolus.

The inflow of air into the lungs occurs via the respiratory airways. In health, these airways begin with the nose. It is possible to begin with the mouth, which is the backup breathing system. However, chronic mouth breathing leads to, or is a sign of, illness, and there is no mucus in the mouth to trap unwanted substances unlike the nostrils. They end in the microscopic dead-end sacs (alveoli) always opened, though the diameters of the various airways can be changed by the sympathetic and parasympathetic nervous systems. The alveolar air pressure is therefore always close to atmospheric air pressure (about 100 kPa at sea level) at rest, with the pressure gradients that cause air to move in and out of the lungs during breathing rarely exceeding 2–3 kPa.

Other muscles that can be involved in inhalation include:

- External intercostal muscles
- Scalene muscles
- Sternocleidomastoid muscle
- Trapezius muscle

== Hyperinflation ==
Hyperinflation or hyperaeration is where the lung volume is abnormally increased, with increased filling of the alveoli. This results in an increased radiolucency on X-ray, a reduction in lung markings and depression of the diaphragm. It may occur in partial obstruction of a large airway, as in e.g. congenital lobar emphysema, bronchial atresia and mucus plugs in asthma.

== Yoga ==
Yogis such as B. K. S. Iyengar advocate both inhaling and exhaling through the nose in the practice of yoga, rather than inhaling through the nose and exhaling through the mouth. They tell their students that the "nose is for breathing, the mouth is for eating."

== See also ==
- Exhalation
- Inhalant – psychoactive drugs consumed through inhalation
- List of terms of lung size and activity
- Mouth breathing
- Obligate nasal breathing
- Respiratory system
- Smoking - a specific inhalation route
- Breathing
- Work of breathing
