= Richard H. Barrett =

American speech-language pathologist (1915–1994)

Richard Howard Barrett (June 10, 1915 – December 24, 1994), was an American speech-language pathologist and co-author of two early textbooks on the subject of orofacial myology: Oral Myofunctional Disorders, and Fundamentals of Orofacial Myology. Barrett was a founding father of the professional association that would become the International Association of Orofacial Myology, and he served as its president from 1977 to 1979. In his clinical practice he treated swallowing disorders related to muscular dysfunction and trained hundreds of other clinicians in the use of his techniques.
