= Tongue training =

Technique used to encourage proper tongue motion

Tongue training is a technique used to encourage proper tongue motion. Tongue training is used to treat individuals suffering from Ankyloglossia (the "tongue tied" medical condition) and other tongue dysfunctions. It is important for individuals suffering from orofacial myological disorders. Tongue training is a method used to teach the correct accent of any language.

Brazil is the only country to have legislated a state law requiring a tongue evaluation to be performed for each newborn as a screening test (“teste da linguine” under Law 13.002 / 2014).

== Tongue malfunction ==
Appropriate motion and strength of the tongue are vital for eating, swallowing, and breathing. Tongue motion plays a fundamental role in the development of oral and facial structures, as insufficient tongue motion may cause many body malfunctions.

Many tongue malfunctions are not diagnosed at the newborn stage, which can have significant consequences in later life, such as:

- Breastfeeding difficulties
- Palate abnormalities
- Colic
- Gastroesophageal reflux disease
- Altered breathing patterns
- Altered sleep patterns resulting in poor sleep quality
- Sleep apnea
- Swallowing difficulties
- Otitis / Ear Infection
- Impaired speech
- Postural issues
- Neck pain
- Dental issues
- TMJ problems

== Protocols ==
Historically, in many cultures, physicians have performed tongue releases for babies with significant benefits. Various protocols exist for diagnosing and treating tongue malfunctions.

The protocol depends on the caregiver's profession and the patient's age.

Studies show that passive and active tongue exercises are required to improve tongue motion. Tongue training is an encouragement or neuromuscular re-education, which helps strengthen tongue muscle. This is critical for a positive prognosis post-frenectomy.

It is now standard that when a sub-functional tongue is diagnosed, even in infants, the caregiver recommends tongue exercises, before a referral for a frenectomy, as well as after the procedure. This conditions the baby and the parent/caretaker, and begins to "fire and wire the muscles to help overall tone and strength” of the tongue.

In addition to the standard tongue training protocol for a diagnosed sub-functional tongue using methods and tools enable comfortable, pleasant and practical tongue training, lead caregivers recommend that each newborn receive a tongue training of two weeks accompanied by professional guidance.
