= TBX22 =

Protein-coding gene in the species Homo sapiens

Identifiers
- Aliases: TBX22, ABERS, CLPA, CPX, TBXX, dJ795G23.1, T-box 22, T-box transcription factor 22
- External IDs: OMIM: 300307; MGI: 2389465; GeneCards: TBX22

Gene location (Human)
Chr.	X chromosome (human)
Band	Xq21.1	Start	80,014,753 bp
Band	Xq21.1	End	80,031,774 bp

Gene location (Mouse)
Chr.	X chromosome (mouse)
Band	X D|X 47.59 cM	Start	106,711,570 bp
Band	X D|X 47.59 cM	End	106,732,584 bp
RNA expression pattern
Bgee	Human / Mouse (ortholog); Top expressed in: left testis; right testis; right lobe of thyroid gland; left lobe of thyroid gland; gonad; right auricle of heart; Descending thoracic aorta; popliteal artery; tibial arteries; ascending aorta / Top expressed in: tongue; nasal septum; ciliary body; olfactory gland; iris; mandibular prominence; maxillary prominence; medial nasal prominence; oral mucosa; spermatocyte; More reference expression data
BioGPS	n/a
Gene ontology
Molecular function	DNA-binding transcription factor activity; DNA binding; protein binding; RNA polymerase II transcription regulatory region sequence-specific DNA binding; DNA-binding transcription repressor activity, RNA polymerase II-specific; DNA-binding transcription factor activity, RNA polymerase II-specific
Cellular component	nucleus
Biological process	multicellular organism development; negative regulation of transcription, DNA-templated; regulation of transcription, DNA-templated; negative regulation of transcription by RNA polymerase II; transcription, DNA-templated
Sources:Amigo / QuickGO
Orthologs
Databases	NCBI: entry; OMA: entry
Species	Human	Mouse
Entrez	50945	245572
Ensembl	ENSG00000277800; ENSG00000122145	ENSMUSG00000031241
UniProt	Q9Y458	Q8K402
RefSeq (mRNA)	NM_001109878; NM_001109879; NM_001303475; NM_016954	NM_001290747; NM_145224; NM_181319
RefSeq (protein)	NP_001103348; NP_001103349; NP_001290404; NP_058650	NP_001277676; NP_660259; NP_851836
Location (UCSC)	Chr X: 80.01 – 80.03 Mb	Chr X: 106.71 – 106.73 Mb
PubMed search
- Wikidata
View/Edit Human	View/Edit Mouse

T-box transcription factor TBX22 is a protein that in humans is encoded by the TBX22 gene.

TBX22 is a member of a phylogenetically conserved family of proteins that share a common DNA-binding domain, the T-box. T-box genes encode transcription factors involved in the regulation of developmental processes. Mutations in this gene have been associated with the inherited X-linked disorder, cleft palate with ankyloglossia (tongue-tie), and it is believed to play a major role in human palatogenesis. It has previously been mapped to the long arm of the X chromosome and it has now been demonstrated that mutations in the gene TBX22 are the cause of this syndrome. TBX22 mutations also result in non-syndromic cleft palate in some populations.

TBX22 is composed of seven exons spanning 8.7 kilobases of genomic DNA in Xq21.1. The TBX22 mRNA is 2099 base pairs long and encodes a 400-amino-acids protein containing a T-domain in its NH_{2}-terminal region which has the unique feature of missing 20 amino-acids relative to the other known T-domains.

== Function ==
T-box genes are members of a family of transcriptional regulators that contain a region encoding a conserved DNA-binding motif of approximately 200 amino acids: the T-domain. These genes are grouped together on the basis of the homology existing between their products and the mouse Brachyury (or T) protein. In human and mouse, numerous T-domain-containing genes have been identified so far and mapped throughout the genome. The spatio-temporal expression of these genes is strictly regulated during the development of both vertebrates and invertebrates.

Functional studies have demonstrated that several T-box genes are involved in mesoderm specification in the developing embryo of mouse or Xenopus. In mice, the Brachyury gene is expressed in early mesoderm cells and its expression then becomes restricted to the notochord. The Brachyury protein binds as a dimer to a 20-nucleotide partially palindromic sequence recognized by its T-domain. More generally, T-box genes have been shown to be critical during development for proper morphogenesis and organogenesis. Abnormal expression of several T-box genes has been shown to cause developmental anomalies in mouse, Drosophila or zebrafish.

== Clinical significance ==
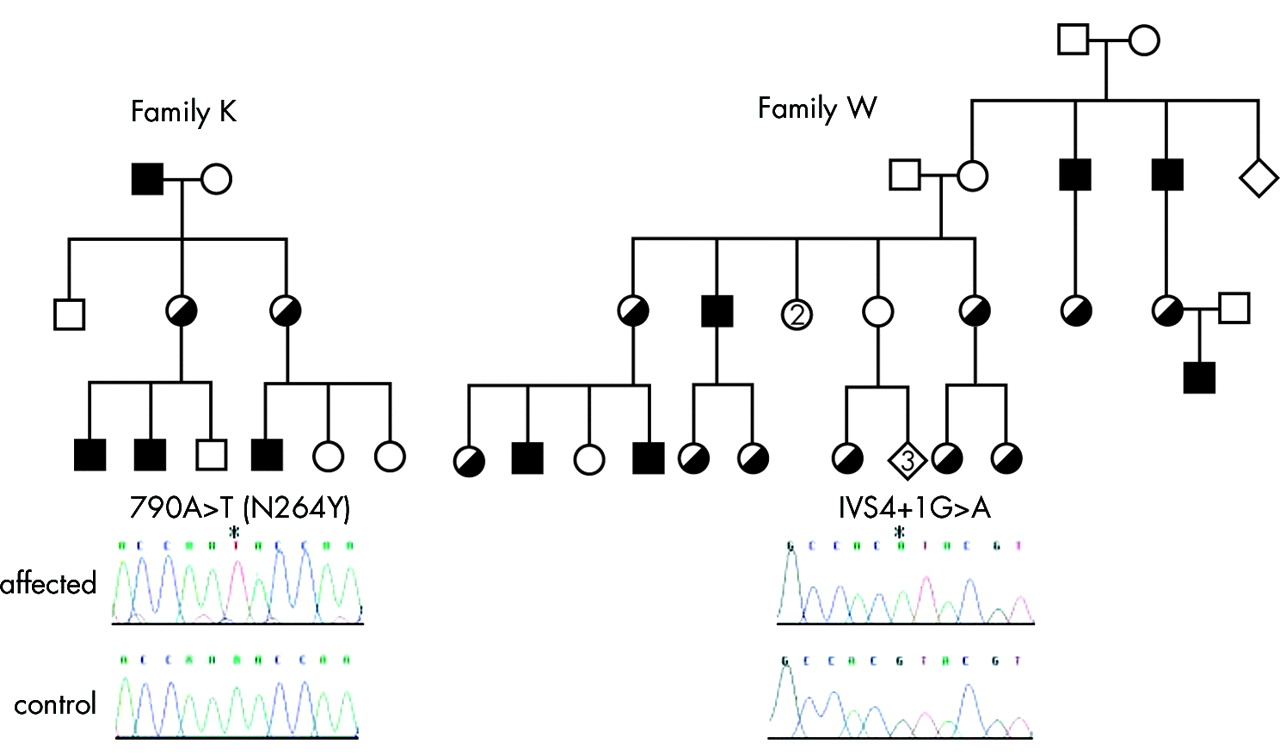
TBX22 mutations in two families predicted to have X linked cleft palate and ankyloglossia. Sequence electropherograms from genomic DNA amplified from exon 5 (family K) and exon 4 (family W) are of affected (mutant) males and unaffected (control) females. *Represents the site of the sequence variant.

In humans, two T-box genes are involved in inherited disorders: mutations in TBX5 cause Holt–Oram syndrome, whereas mutations in TBX3 cause ulnar–mammary syndrome.

Mutations in TBX22 cause X-linked cleft palate and ankyloglossia. CPX has been described in a small number of families exhibiting a strong X linked Mendelian inheritance. The cleft phenotype predominantly affects males who show variation ranging from a complete cleft of the secondary palate, submucous cleft, or bifid uvula to high arched palate. Ankyloglossia is frequently seen in affected patients and carrier females, and has proved to be a useful indicator of CPX. Temporal and spatial studies using in situ hybridization in both human and mouse has shown that TBX22/Tbx22 is expressed primarily in the palatal shelves and tongue during palatogenesis, indicating a specific role of TBX22 in both palatal and tongue development. In addition to families with well defined X linked inheritance, TBX22 mutations have been identified in several families where pedigree size and/or family history were too limited to predict mode of inheritance. In these cases, ascertainment was largely based on the presence of ankyloglossia as well as cleft palate.

It has been demonstrated that TBX22 makes a significant contribution to the prevalence of cleft palate at least in the Brazilian and the North American cohorts. To date, 10 different TBX22 mutations have been reported in patients with CP and/or ankyloglossia. These include small deletions/insertions, nonsense, splice site, frameshift and missense alterations.
