= Open bite malocclusion =

Medical condition

Open bite is a type of orthodontic malocclusion which has been estimated to occur in 0.6% of the people in the United States. This type of malocclusion has no vertical overlap or contact between the anterior incisors. The term "open bite" was coined by Carevelli in 1842 as a distinct classification of malocclusion. Different authors have described the open bite in a variety of ways. Some authors have suggested that open bite often arises when overbite is less than the usual amount. Additionally, others have contended that open bite is identified by end-on incisal relationships. Lastly, some researchers have stated that a lack of incisal contact must be present to diagnose an open bite.

Treatment of an open bite is complex and long-term stability is difficult to achieve, making it a challenging condition due to the high risk of vertical relapse, regardless of the treatment method used or the retention protocol followed.

== Causes ==
Open bite malocclusion can happen due to several reasons. The teeth and the alveolar bones are subject to opposing forces and pressures mainly due to muscle movement, which could potentially have an impact on the positioning of the teeth. On the contrary, the intrinsic forces of the lips and tongue while at rest create a necessary equilibrium to place the teeth in their correct position. Balance is when a body remains at rest, even when various forces are pushing it in different directions, and it doesn't accelerate or (in the case of teeth) move. Whenever this equilibrium is changed, differences manifest, like, for example, the shrinkage of dental arches in animals which underwent glossectomy when compared to the control animals. When a tooth is extracted, its antagonist continues the process of passive eruption, indicating that the mechanism of eruption remains essentially unchanged throughout life, and the tooth still seeks out occlusal or incisal contact until balance is achieved. Based on this idea of balance several etio-logical factors related to oral function have been associated with AOB.

It may be genetic in nature, leading to a skeletal open bite or can be caused by functional habits which may lead to dental open bite. In the earlier age, open bite may occur due to a transitional change from primary to the permanent dentition. Some factors that may cause an open bite are:

- Tongue thrusting
- Thumb sucking
- Long-term usage of Pacifier
- Macroglossia
- Airway obstruction
- Adenoid hypertrophy
- Nasal concha Hypertrophy

The link between AOB and non-nutritive sucking habits like finger and pacifier sucking has been proven. Once these habits are removed, AOB generally corrects itself, as long as no additional dysfunctions have occurred. These secondary dysfunctions can be caused by the protrusion of maxillary incisors due to sucking habits, which impedes the lip seal needed for swallowing and causes an abnormal resting tongue position. During childhood, the tongue is proportionally bigger than the oral cavity, thus protruding beyond the alveolar ridges. The jaw bones grow quicker than the tongue during childhood and eventually, the oral cavity will adjust to accommodate the size of the tongue. Some authors suggest that the muscular forces generated during swallowing and speaking could potentially warp the shape of the dental arches. However, other studies suggest that these effects are temporary and insufficient to cause long-term changes in the dental arches. Hypertrophic adenoids and tonsils are the most common cause of nasal obstruction and consequently, mouth breathing in children. The effect of airway obstruction on the occlusion was demonstrated by Harvold et al. who, after placing acrylic blocks in the posterior region of the palate of rhesus monkeys, found that AOB had developed.

== Types ==
=== Anterior open bite ===
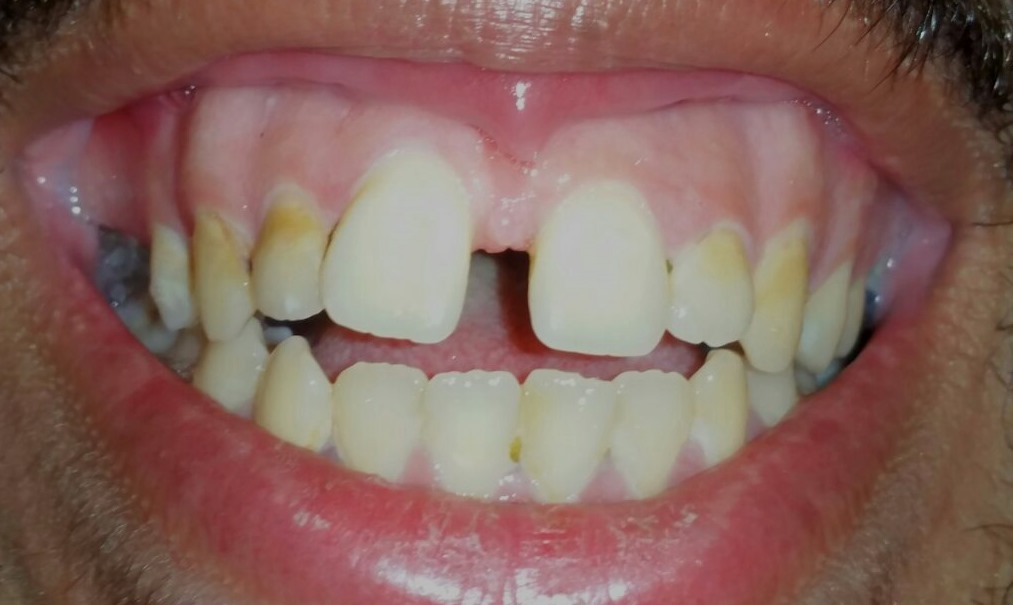
Anterior open bite resulted from tongue thrusting in a 24 y.o. patient. Anterior upper teeth are not touching their counterpart.

Anterior open bite (AOB) is defined as a condition in which there is no contact and no vertical overlap of the lower incisor crown with the upper incisor crown when the mandible is in full occlusion. An anterior open bite occurs in humans when the front teeth fail to touch and there is no overlap between upper incisors and lower incisors. Anterior open can be caused by functional habits such as digit sucking, tongue thrust or long-term pacifier use. When digit sucking habit is present in the late primary to early mixed dentition stages, it can lead to different side-effects such as upper teeth flaring out, lower teeth flaring in, increase in the open bite and the overjet. A posterior crossbite in these children along with decrease in intercanine and intermolar width is also found. The more intense (longer) the habit, the worse the malocclusion may be. In a study of an adult Caucasian American population, it was reported that the prevalence of AOB (acute apical abscess) was approximately 3%, though this can vary from 1.5-11% depending on the ethnicity and age of the participant's teeth. A complex AOB malocclusion is typically caused by a combination of habit, skeletal, dental, and functional factors.

Pacifier use has also shown to cause anterior open bites in children. Pacifier use which lasts longer than 18 months, may cause this malocclusion. It is shown that as long as the sucking habit stops before the eruption of permanent teeth, the open bite self-corrects. In some cases, behavior modification may be necessary to eliminate the dental habits. If all else fails, then a tongue crib can be used.

==== Prevalence ====
The prevalence of AOB (Anterior Open Bite) can differ significantly between studies, as authors may define it differently. In the population, prevalence is estimated to be somewhere between 1.5% and 11%. Age plays a role in how common AOB is, with prevalence decreasing as children age and develop better oral function. For example, at the age of six, 4.2% exhibit AOB, while by the time they are fourteen, this number has gone down to only 2%. The US population showed disparities in prevalence across different ethnicities, with 3.5% observed among Caucasian children and 16.5% among Afro-descendant children.

=== Posterior open bite ===
Posterior open bite is caused when posterior teeth such as molars or premolars fail to touch their counterpart tooth. This is more likely to occur in segments where there may be unilateral open bite or open bite related to one or more teeth. Failure of eruption of teeth either due to primary failure or mechanical obstruction during eruption phase can cause the open bite. Sometimes lateral tongue thrust may also prevent the eruption of the posterior teeth, thus eliminating this habit maybe key to eruption in those instances.

=== Skeletal open bite ===
Patient with skeletal open bites that accompany dental open bites may have Adenoid faces or Long face syndrome. They are said to have what is known as Hyperdivergent Growth Pattern which includes characteristics such as:

- Increased Lower Anterior Facial Height
- Occlusal plane diverges after the 1st molar contact
- May accompany dental open bite
- Narrow nostrils with upturned nose
- Dolicofacial or Leptoprosopic face pattern
- Constricted maxillary arch
- Bilateral Posterior Crossbite
- High and narrow palatal vault
- Presence of crowding in teeth
- Mentalis muscle strain upon forcibly closing of lips
- Possible gummy smile with increased interlabial gap

Cephalometric analysis features of skeletal open bite may include:

- Increased Frankfurt-Mandibular Plane angle
- Steep Occlusal Plane Angle
- Increased SN-MP Angle
- Short Mandibular ramus
- Increased mandibular body length
- Downward and backward position of mandible
- Increased gonial angle
- Proclined upper incisors, retroclined or upright lower incisors
- Posterior part of maxilla is tipped downwards
- Posterior facial height equals 1/2 of anterior facial height
- Increased hard tissue Lower Anterior Facial Height
- Increased total anterior facial height
- Short mandibular ramus

Viken Sassouni developed Sassouni analysis which indicates that patient's with long face syndrome have 4 of their bony planes (mandibular plane, occlusal plane, palatal plane, SN plane) steep to each other.

=== Dental open bite ===
Dental open bite occurs in patients where the anterior teeth fail to touch. However, this is not accompanied by the skeletal tendency of having an open bite. Thus this type of open bite may happen in patients who have horizontal or hypodivergent growth pattern. These patients have normal jaw growth and do not have the long face syndrome. The anterior open bite in these patients may be caused by Macroglossia, Tongue thrusting habit or digit sucking habits. Some of the characteristics of a dental open bite include:

- Normal lower anterior facial height
- Horizontal/Hypodivergent growth pattern
- Occlusal plane diverges after the premolar contact
- Under-eruption of the anterior incisors
- Over-eruption of the posterior molars
- Proclined upper and lower incisors
- No vertical maxillary excess or gummy smile
- Presence of habits such as thumb sucking, tongue thrusting
- Spacing between anterior incisors due to their proclination

== Open bite correction ==
=== Primary/mixed dentition ===
==== Behavior modification ====
Behavior therapy is important especially when children are in their primary dentition in the pre-adolescent age. Improving habits at this time may lead to self-correction of open bite in many cases. Sometimes presence of infantile swallowing into early childhood may lead to an anterior open bite. Habit control through appliances such as Tongue crib or Tongue spurs may be used in adolescents if behavior modification fails to stop the habit.

==== Tongue crib therapy ====
A tongue crib is a removable appliance placed in the maxillary arch to stop the tongue thrusting habit. This appliance may be used in patients with mixed dentition or permanent dentition. The tongue crib is attached through a bar to two bands placed on the upper 1st molars. The crib is shaped like a horseshoe with metal bars that prevent thrusting. The tongue crib eliminates the habit in approximately 90% of patients. . Huang et al. published a study in 1990 which stated that patients who achieved a positive overbite during their tongue crib therapy had a good chance of maintaining that overbite after their orthodontic treatment. They credited this change to a change in the posterior positioning of the tongue due to the crib therapy.

Some of the side-effects of using a tongue-crib therapy is that this appliance may trap food, causing inflammation around the appliance. Repeated contact of the tongue with the appliance may lead to an imprint on the tongue which will self-resolve when the appliance is removed. This type of therapy will only work in patients who do not have a skeletal open bite tendency. A skeletal open bite tendency may be addressed via surgery or other treatment.

==== Blue Grass appliance ====
It's a type of appliance which is similar to Nance appliance, but instead of acrylic pad that rests on the anterior palate, this appliance has a plastic roller that patient can use their tongue to break their habit. This appliance is banded to the upper 1st molars and bars extend the appliance to anterior palate where the plastic roller is placed.

==== Vertical pull chin cup ====
Hakan Iscan and others used vertical pull chin cup in 17 patients for 9 months where they applied 400g of force on each side. Compared to controls, they found that patients included in the experimental group had increased eruption of the mandibular incisors, decrease of the ramal inclination, decrease of the mandibular plane, increase of the overbite, decrease of the gonial angle and increase of the mandibular corpus inclination were found. They stated that vertical chin cup maybe effective in treating skeletal open bite patients. However, Pedrin et al. used removable plate with palatal crib and combined it with a high-pull chin cup in 30 patients for 12 months and compared it to 30 patients who were followed with no treatment. They found that no positive skeletal influence on the vertical facial pattern of patients treated for open bite in the mixed dentition by their stated protocol. Another study stated that there is no positive effect of vertical pull chin cup in controlling the vertical facial height and that close of an anterior open bite was mostly done by dentoalveolar changes.

=== Permanent dentition ===
Correction of open bite in permanent dentition may involve extrusion of the anterior teeth or intrusion of the posterior teeth. This decision depends on the incisor show on smiling for a patient. If a patient has normal incisor show at rest smile, than molar intrusion may be done in these types of faces. Extrusion of anterior teeth in these patients will lead to excessive gummy smile which in some cases is not desirable. If a patient does not have a normal incisor show at rest and smile, then anterior extrusion may be done in these patients.

==== High-Pull Headgear ====
This appliance can be used with patients who are growing and in permanent dentition. This appliance has been advocated to be used mainly for controlling the vertical dimension by applying force to intrude molars.

==== Elastics ====
Elastics have been used to correct anterior dental open bite. These elastics can be in configuration of triangular or anterior vertical elastics.

==== Bite blocks ====
R. Kuster and B. Ingerval in 1992, used two types of bite blocks to evaluate their effect on skeletal open bite patients. One group of patients had spring-loaded bite block for one year and other group had repelling magnets as bite blocks for 3 months. Both type of bite blocks exerted intrusive force on both upper and lower posterior teeth. They saw 3mm improvement in overbite with magnet group and 1.3mm improvement in overbite with spring-loaded group. They concluded that this effect resulted due to counter-clockwise rotation of mandible which was caused by intrusion of posterior teeth and increased eruption of incisors.

==== Glossectomy ====
There are not systematic reviews or randomized clinical control trials related to correction of open bite with partial tongue glossectomy but several case reports have been published indicating successful treatment of open bite with this surgical approach. Macroglossia has been reported to cause open bite and bimaxillary protrusion and is also known to be make orthodontic treatment unstable after its completion.

==== Orthognathic surgery ====
An orthognathic surgical approach can be taken to correct an open bite once vertical growth has finished in male and female patients. At that time, a Le Fort I osteotomy to impact the maxilla is usually done. According to Proffit et al., surgical movement that involves maxillary impaction is the most stable surgical movement in the hierarchy they established. A two jaw surgery can also be performed where Bilateral Sagittal Split Osteotomy can be done to correct any Antero-Posterior changes of the mandible. However, with two jaw surgery a relapse leading to bite opening may happen due to condylar remodeling and resorption.

== Stability and relapse ==
=== Surgery vs. non-surgery ===
Geoffrey Greenlee and others published a meta-analysis in 2011 which concluded that patients with orthognathic surgical correction of open bite had 82% stability in comparison to non-surgical correction of open bite which had 75% of stability after 1or more year of treatment. Both the groups started with 2–3 mm of open bite initially.

=== Molar intrusion ===
Man-Suk Baek and others evaluated long-term stability of anterior open bite by intrusion of maxillary posterior teeth. Their results showed that the molars were intruded by 2.39 mm during treatment and relapsed back by 0.45 mm or 22.8%. The incisal overbite increased by 5.56 mm during treatment and relapsed back by 1.20 mm or 17%. They concluded that majority of the relapse occurred during first year of treatment.

== See also ==
- Cephalometric analysis
- Intrusion (orthodontics)
- Long face syndrome
