= Ankyloglossia =

Congenital disorder of tongue mobility

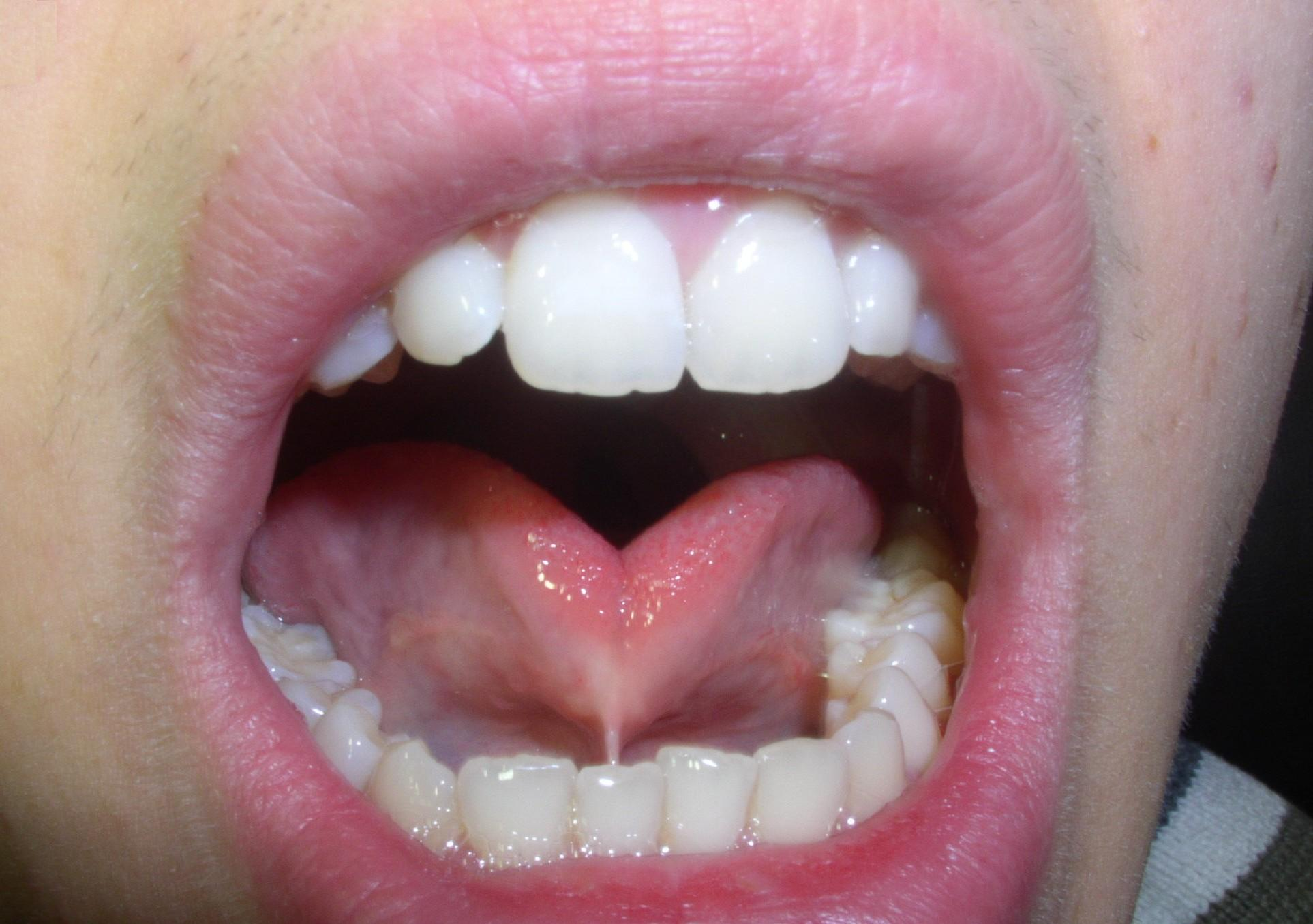
- Adult with ankyloglossia
- Specialty: Medical genetics

Ankyloglossia, also known as tongue-tie, is a congenital oral anomaly that may decrease the mobility of the tongue tip and is caused by an unusually short, thick lingual frenulum, a membrane connecting the underside of the tongue to the floor of the mouth. Ankyloglossia varies in degree of severity from mild cases characterized by mucous membrane bands to complete ankyloglossia whereby the tongue is tethered to the floor of the mouth.

== Definition ==
Tongue-tie is "a condition that impairs tongue movement due to a restrictive lingual frenulum". As of 2025, no definition, classification system, or diagnostic parameters and, therefore, no definite management parameters, have been generally accepted.

== Cause ==
The cause for tongue tie is unknown. While research suggests that tongue-tie could be heritable, most people with it have no inborn diseases. There are associations between X-linked cleft palate syndrome and rare syndromes, including Kindler syndrome, Opitz syndrome, and Van Der Woude syndrome.

== Presentation ==
Ankyloglossia can affect eating (especially breastfeeding), speech, and oral hygiene, and can have other mechanical and social effects. Ankyloglossia can also prevent the tongue from contacting the anterior palate. This can then promote an infantile swallow and hamper the progression to an adult-like swallow which can result in an open bite deformity. It can also result in mandibular prognathism; this happens when the tongue contacts the anterior portion of the mandible with exaggerated anterior thrusts.

Opinion varies regarding how frequently ankyloglossia truly causes problems. Some professionals believe it is rarely symptomatic, whereas others believe it is associated with a variety of problems. The disagreement among professionals was documented in a study by Messner and Lalakea (2000).

=== Feeding ===
Messner et al. studied ankyloglossia and infant feeding. Thirty-six infants with ankyloglossia were compared to a control group without ankyloglossia. The two groups were followed for six months to assess possible breastfeeding difficulties; defined as nipple pain lasting more than six weeks, or infant difficulty latching onto or staying onto the mother's breast. Twenty-five percent of mothers of infants with ankyloglossia reported breastfeeding difficulty compared with only 3% of the mothers in the control group. The study concluded that ankyloglossia can adversely affect breastfeeding in certain infants. Infants with ankyloglossia do not, however, have such big difficulties when feeding from a bottle.

Wallace and Clark also studied breastfeeding difficulties in infants with ankyloglossia. They followed 10 infants with ankyloglossia who underwent surgical tongue-tie division. Eight of the ten mothers experienced poor infant latching onto the breast, 6/10 experienced sore nipples and 5/10 experienced continual feeding cycles; 3/10 mothers were exclusively breastfeeding. Following a tongue-tie division, 4/10 mothers noted immediate improvements in breastfeeding, 3/10 mothers did not notice any improvements and 6/10 mothers continued breastfeeding for at least four months after the surgery. The study concluded that tongue-tie division may be a benefit for infants experiencing breastfeeding difficulties due to ankyloglossia and further investigation is warranted.

=== Speech ===
Messner and Lalakea studied speech in children with ankyloglossia. They noted that the phonemes likely to be affected due to ankyloglossia include sibilants and lingual sounds such as 'r'. In addition, the authors also state that it is uncertain as to which patients will have a speech disorder that can be linked to ankyloglossia and that there is no way to predict at a young age which patients will need treatment. The authors studied 30 children from one to 12 years of age with ankyloglossia, all of whom underwent frenuloplasty. Fifteen children underwent speech evaluation before and after surgery. Eleven patients were found to have abnormal articulation before surgery and nine of these patients were found to have improved articulation after surgery. Based on the findings, the authors concluded that it is possible for children with ankyloglossia to have normal speech in spite of decreased tongue mobility. However, according to their study, a large percentage of children with ankyloglossia will have articulation deficits that can be linked to tongue-tie and these deficits may be improved with surgery. The authors also note that ankyloglossia does not cause a delay in speech or language, but at the most, problems with enunciation. Limitations of the study include a small sample size as well as a lack of blinding of the speech-language pathologists who evaluated the subjects' speech.

Several recent systematic reviews and randomized control trials have argued that ankyloglossia does not impact speech sound development and that there is no difference in speech sound development between children who received surgery to release tongue-tie and those who did not.

Messner and Lalakea also examined speech and ankyloglossia in another study. They studied 15 patients and speech was grossly normal in all the subjects. However, half of the subjects reported that they thought that their speech was more effortful than other peoples' speech.

Horton and colleagues discussed the relationship between ankyloglossia and speech. They believe that the tongue-tie contributes to difficulty in range and rate of articulation and that compensation is needed. Compensation at its worst may involve a Cupid's bow of the tongue.

Although the tongue-tie exists, and even years following surgery, common speech abnormalities include mispronunciation of words, the most common of which is pronouncing Ls as Ws; for example, the word "lemonade" would come out as "wemonade".

=== Mechanical and social effects ===
Ankyloglossia can result in mechanical and social effects. Lalakea and Messner studied 15 people, aged 14 to 68 years old. The subjects were given questionnaires in order to assess functional complaints associated with ankyloglossia. Eight subjects noted one or more mechanical limitations which included cuts or discomfort underneath the tongue and difficulties with kissing, licking one's lips, eating an ice cream cone, keeping one's tongue clean and performing tongue tricks. In addition, seven subjects noted social effects such as embarrassment and teasing. The authors concluded that this study confirmed anecdotal evidence of mechanical problems associated with ankyloglossia and it suggests that the kinds of mechanical and social problems noted may be more prevalent than previously thought. Furthermore, the authors note that some patients may be unaware of the extent of the limitations they have due to ankyloglossia, since they have never experienced a normal tongue range of motion.

Lalakea and Messner note that mechanical and social effects may occur even without other problems related to ankyloglossia, such as speech and feeding difficulties. Also, mechanical and social effects may not arise until later in childhood, as younger children may be unable to recognize or report the effects. In addition, some problems, such as kissing, may not come about until later in life.

=== Tongue posture and mouth breathing ===
Ankyloglossia most often prohibits the tongue from resting in its ideal posture, at the roof of the mouth. When the tongue rests at the roof of the mouth, it enables nasal breathing. A seemingly unrelated consequence of ankyloglossia is chronic mouth breathing. Mouth breathing is correlated with other health issues such as enlarged tonsils and adenoids, chronic ear infections, and sleep-disordered breathing.

=== Dental issues ===
Ankyloglossia is correlated to grinding teeth (bruxism) and temporomandibular joint (TMJ) pain. When the tongue normally rests at the roof of the mouth, it leads to the development of an ideal U-shaped palate. Ankyloglossia often causes a narrow, V-shaped palate to develop, which crowds teeth and increases the potential need for braces and possibly jaw surgery.

=== Fascia and muscle compensation ===
The lingual frenulum under the tongue is part of the body's larger fascia network. It is hypothesized that, when the tongue is restricted by an overly tight frenulum, the tightness can travel to other nearby parts of the body such as the neck causing muscle tightness and poor posture. The tongue being restricted then could force other muscles in the neck and jaw to compensate causing muscle soreness.

== Diagnosis ==
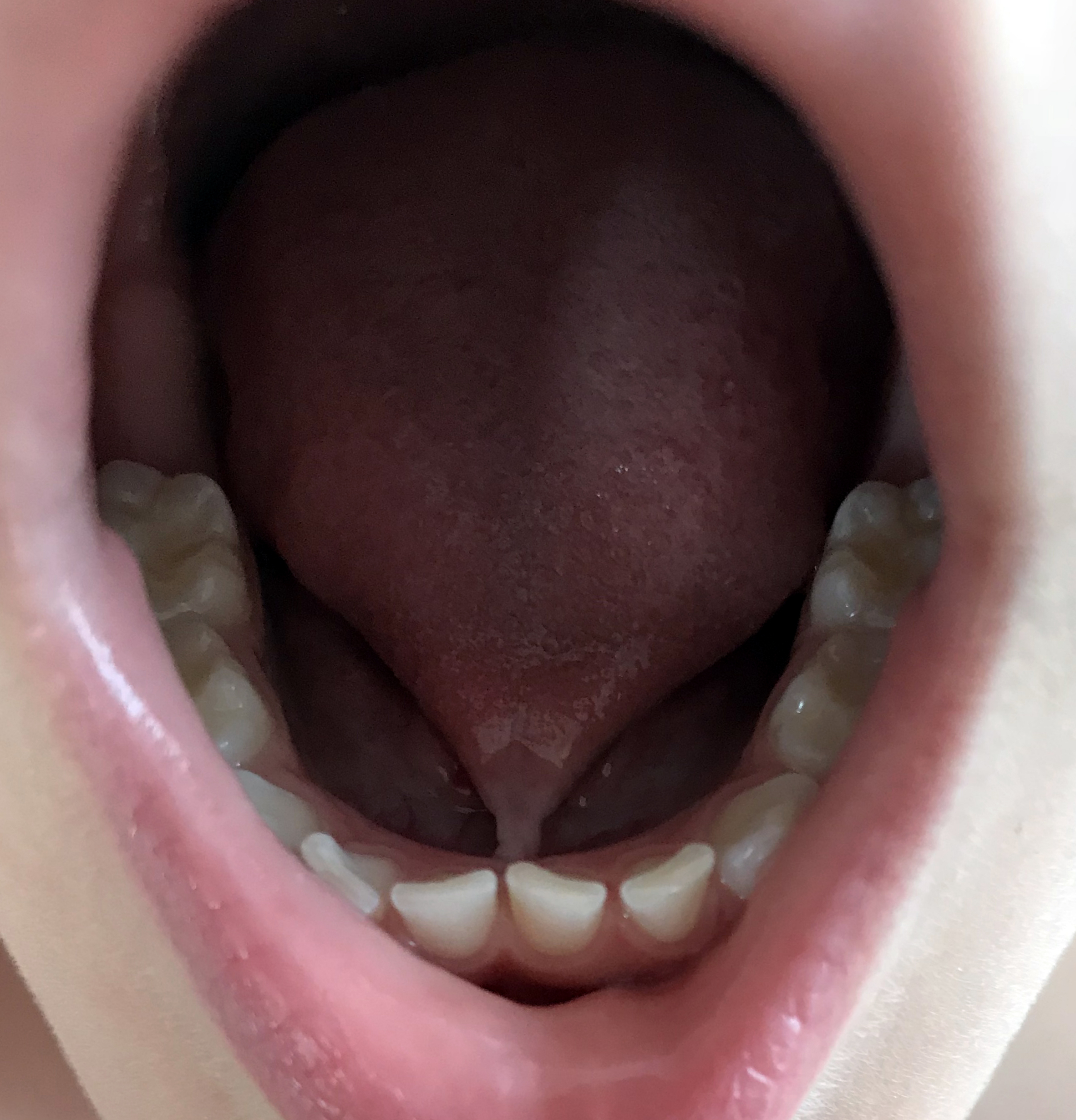
Ankyloglossia

According to Horton et al., diagnosis of ankyloglossia may be difficult; it is not always apparent by looking at the underside of the tongue, but is often dependent on the range of movement permitted by the genioglossus muscles. For infants, passively elevating the tongue tip with a tongue depressor may reveal the problem. For older children, making the tongue move to its maximum range will demonstrate the tongue tip restriction. In addition, palpation of genioglossus on the underside of the tongue will aid in confirming the diagnosis.

Some signs of ankyloglossia can be difficulty speaking, difficulty eating, ongoing dental issues, jaw pain, or migraines.

A severity scale for ankyloglossia, which grades the appearance and function of the tongue, is recommended for use in the Academy of Breastfeeding Medicine.

== Treatment ==
There are varying types of intervention for ankyloglossia. Intervention for ankyloglossia does sometimes include surgery in the form of frenotomy (also called a frenectomy or frenulectomy) or frenuloplasty. This relatively common dental procedure may be done with soft-tissue lasers, such as the CO_{2} laser.

A frenotomy can be performed as a standalone procedure or as part of another surgery. The procedure is typically quick and is performed under local anesthesia. First, the area under the tongue is numbed with an injection. Once the patient is numb, a small incision is made in the tissue and the tongue is freed from its tether. The incision is then closed with dissolvable sutures. Recovery from a frenotomy is typically quick and most patients experience little to no pain or discomfort.

According to Lalakea and Messner, surgery can be considered for patients of any age with a tight frenulum, as well as a history of speech, feeding, or mechanical/social difficulties. Adults with ankyloglossia may elect the procedure. Some of those who have done so report post-operative pain.

Horton et al., have a classical belief that people with ankyloglossia can compensate in their speech for a limited tongue range of motion. For example, if the tip of the tongue is restricted for making sounds such as /n, t, d, l/, the tongue can compensate through dentalization; this is when the tongue tip moves forward and up. When producing /r/, the elevation of the mandible can compensate for restriction of tongue movement. Also, compensations can be made for /s/ and /z/ by using the dorsum of the tongue for contact against the palate rugae. Thus, Horton et al. proposed compensatory strategies as a way to counteract the adverse effects of ankyloglossia and did not promote surgery. Non-surgical treatments for ankyloglossia are typically performed by Orofacial Myology specialists, and involve using exercises to strengthen and improve the function of the facial muscles and thus promote the proper function of the face, mouth, and tongue.

An alternative to surgery for children with ankyloglossia is to take a wait-and-see approach, which is more common if there are no impacts on feeding. Ruffoli et al. report that the frenulum naturally recedes during the process of a child's growth between six months and six years of age.
