= Mouth taping =

Sleeping with the lips taped shut

Mouth taping is the practice of sleeping with one's lips held shut by a strip of surgical tape, which prevents mouth breathing during sleep. This supposed life hack gained popularity through social media in the 2020s. Those who advise in favor of it attribute a variety of health benefits to it, although these claims have not been scientifically verified.

== Health effects ==
As of 2023, there is very limited research as to the health effects of mouth taping.

In principle, breathing through the nose as opposed to breathing through the mouth is beneficial. Nasal breathing humidifies and filters the inhaled air, allows fuller breaths and can help the body relax. The nitric oxide produced in the nasal sinuses while breathing nasally can help lower blood pressure and improve blood flow. Breathing through the mouth while sleeping, on the other hand, dries out the mouth, which can contribute to dental damage, bad breath, hoarseness and dry lips. However, there are a number of conditions that inhibit nasal breathing, such as a deviated septum, allergies, sinusitis or chronic nasal congestion. People with such conditions may find mouth taping impractical.

A few small studies have investigated whether mouth taping alleviates sleep apnea. They found that mouth taping decreases the apnea-hypopnea index (AHI), a measure of apnea severity. They also found that it reduced snoring, which may help the snorers' partners sleep better.
