= TGuard =

Medical device to stop thumb sucking

TGuard is the brand name for a medical device used to stop chronic thumb sucking among children and young adults. It is manufactured in the USA by MED et al., Inc. Referred to commonly by dentists as a ThumbGuard, the company claims that it is the most effective removable appliance therapy used to stop and prevent thumb sucking.

== Theory of operation ==
The device works by breaking the suction which is present during thumb sucking. This suction causes not only damage[2] to the teeth and jaws, but also is responsible for the pleasure that the child seeks when engaging in the habit. By breaking the suction, the child ceases to receive pleasure, and thus, after 3 to 4 weeks of continuous use, stops thumb sucking altogether. The product is made out of a soft, flexible, U.S. Food and Drug Administration (FDA)-listed plastic, and thus, is not designed to guard the thumb, but rather, to provide a means for air to flow which can then interrupt the habit.

== Effectiveness ==
A research trial conducted in 1995 demonstrated a 90% success rate among children. Since then, the company has claimed success rates higher than this, through data collected empirically from users of the product.

== Alternatives ==
The American Dental Association, or ADA, does not endorse painting bitterants, piquants, or otherwise unpleasant substances on children's nails to inhibit the habit. Fixed intra-oral devices, such as hay-rakes, fixed habit appliances, or the bluegrass method, are dental appliances which are physically attached to the child's dentition and used to disrupt the habit.
