= Long face syndrome =

Congenital disorder of the lower face

Long face syndrome, also referred to as skeletal open bite, is a relatively common condition characterised by excessive vertical facial development. Its causes may be either genetic or environmental. Long face syndrome is "a common dentofacial abnormality." Its diagnosis, symptomology and treatments are complex and controversial. Indeed, even its existence as a "syndrome" is disputed.

== Definition and treatment ==
One dental textbook defines it as: "Dolicofacial, there is excess of lower facial height usually associated with lower occlusal and mandibular plane angles." This is often associated "with vertical maxillary excess and mandibular hypoplasia." Luc P. M. Tourne, a Fellow in the Department of TMJ and Craniofacial Pain at the University of Minnesota School of Dentistry, noted: "There is a clinically recognizable facial morphology, the long face syndrome, which has been incompletely described in the literature," However, her study of 31 adults with this syndrome, which included "analysis of esthetics, skeletal morphology, and occlusion" confirmed "this basic dentofacial deformity" has associations " with excessive vertical growth of the maxilla." She reported that "closed bite" and "dental open" are two of the syndrome's variants. (Note: "Experimental evidence suggests that altered muscular function can influence craniofacial morphology. The switch from a nasal to an oronasal breathing pattern induces functional adaptations that include an increase in total anterior face height and vertical development of the lower anterior face. While some animal studies have suggested predictable growth patterns may occur, studies in human subjects have been much more controversial. Therefore, individual variations in response should be expected from the alteration of a long face syndrome patient's breathing mode.")

The treatment for young patients troubled by long face syndrome is to halt and control descent of the lower jaw and to prevent the eruption of posterior teeth. In severe cases of deformity, a mixture of orthodontics and orthognathic surgery may be the only effective solution. The long-term (more than 6 years) effectiveness of surgical treatments for long face syndrome has been subject to study.

"In the American literature, the terms long-face syndrome and short-face syndrome are often used." To be sure, there are reported "long and short face anomalies" and open bite cases. However, in the opinion of Hugo Obwegeser, there is no medical justification for naming them as a "syndrome"—the signs and symptoms do not meet the definitional threshold.

There is controversy concerning the use of the descriptor "long-face syndrome." While increased anterior "total and lower face height" in many ages, combined with vertical maxillary excess in adults has been observed, the causes are controversial. Specifically, there is disagreement about possible potential environmental influences on genetic components.

Anecdotally, it was said to be a genetic condition, which could only be corrected with "massive amounts" of debilitating, frequent and long dental and facial reconstructive surgery.

In children, there is a concern that mouth breathing can contribute to the development of long face syndrome. A recent study finds that it is a growing problem which should be treated as "it won't just go away." In addition to mouth breathing, it may be associated with sleep apnea.

Because of long face syndrome's sometime association with pediatric obstructive sleep apnea (OSA) and allergic reactions, it is essential that treating physicians differentiate the conditions and the treatments; treating one may not cure the other.

== Notable people ==
Actor and screenwriter Craig Chester says he has had the condition.

== See also ==
- Adenoid facies
- Facies (medical)
- Dolichocephaly
