= Matthew Walker (scientist) =

British author, neuroscientist and psychologist

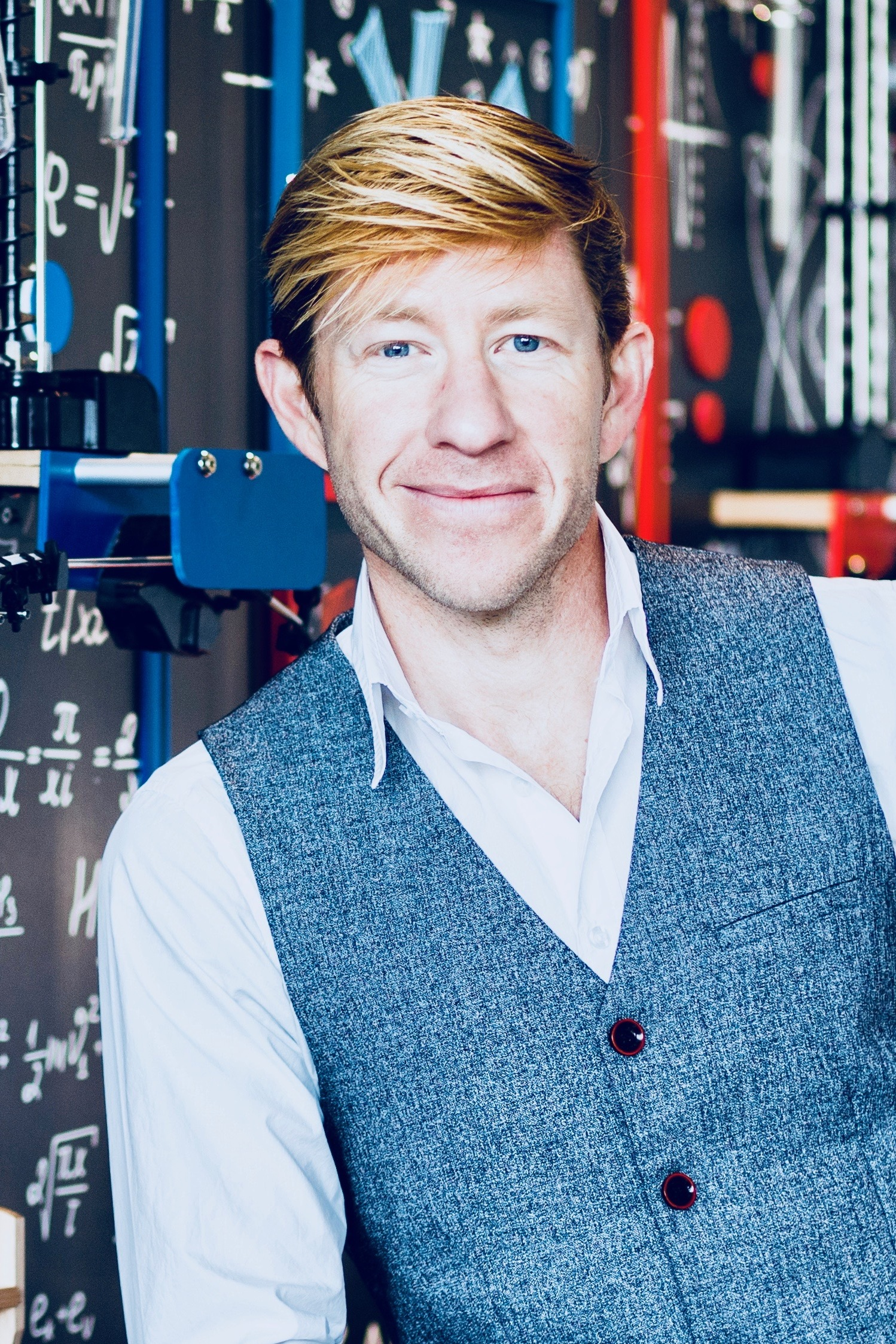
- Born: Matthew Walker; 1972 or 1973 (age 53–54); Liverpool, England
- Education: University of Nottingham (BSc); Newcastle University (PhD)
- Known for: Why We Sleep
- Scientific career
- Fields: Sleep
- Workplaces: Harvard University; University of California, Berkeley
- Thesis: A psychophysiological investigation into fluctuating levels of consciousness in neurodegenerative dementia (1999)
- Website: sleepdiplomat.com

Matthew Walker is a British author, scientist and professor of neuroscience and psychology at the University of California, Berkeley.

As an academic, Walker has focused on the impact of sleep on human health. He has contributed to many scientific research studies. Why We Sleep (2017) is his first work of popular science.

== Early life and education ==
Walker was born in Liverpool, England, and was raised in that city and Chester. Walker graduated with a degree in neuroscience from University of Nottingham in 1996. He received a Ph.D. in neurophysiology from Newcastle University in 1999, where his research was funded by the Medical Research Council (MRC) Neurochemical Pathology Unit.

== Career and research ==
Walker has spent most of his career working in the United States.

=== Harvard University ===
In 2004 Walker became an assistant professor of psychiatry at Harvard Medical School. In one experiment he conducted in 2002, he trained people to type a complex series of keys on a computer keyboard as quickly as possible. One group started in the morning and the other started in the evening, with a 12-hour time interval for each group respectively. He and his colleagues found that those who were tested in the evening first and re-tested after getting a good night's sleep improved their performance significantly without a loss of accuracy compared to their counterparts.

=== University of California, Berkeley ===
Walker left Harvard in 2007 and has taught as a professor of neuroscience and psychology at the University of California, Berkeley. Walker is the founder and director of the Center for Human Sleep Science, which is located in UC Berkeley's department of psychology, in association with the Helen Wills Neuroscience Institute and the Henry H. Wheeler Jr. Brain Imaging Center. The organisation uses brain imaging methods (MRI, PET scanning), high-density sleep electroencephalography recordings, genomics, proteomics, autonomic physiology, brain stimulation, and cognitive testing to investigate the role of sleep in human health and disease. It researches Alzheimer's disease, Parkinson's disease, cancer, depression, anxiety, insomnia, cardiovascular disease, drug abuse, obesity, and diabetes.

=== Verily / Google ===
In 2018 Walker collaborated with research scientists at Project Baseline in developing a sleep diary. Project Baseline is led by Verily (a life sciences research organisation of Alphabet Inc.). In 2020 Walker stated on his website that he was "a Sleep Scientist at Google [helping] the scientific exploration of sleep in health and disease but his LinkedIn states he stopped advising Google in February 2020.

=== Why We Sleep ===
Walker's first book was Why We Sleep: Unlocking the Power of Sleep and Dreams (2017). He spent four years writing the book, in which he asserts that sleep deprivation is linked to numerous fatal diseases, including dementia. The book became a Sunday Times bestseller in the UK, and a New York Times Bestseller in the US. It has also been published in Spanish and in traditional Mandarin Chinese in 2019 by Commonwealth Publishing Group.

Why We Sleep was subject to criticism by Alexey Guzey, an independent researcher with a background in economics, in an essay entitled "Matthew Walker's 'Why We Sleep' Is Riddled with Scientific and Factual Errors". Guzey, together with Andrew Gelman, a statistician at Columbia University, accused Walker of falsification of data in an article published in Chance. Guzey and Gelman argued that "it is unethical to reproduce a graph and remove the one bar in the original graph that contradicts your story". Gelman suggested that the case entered into the territory of "research misconduct."

Walker claimed on numerous occasions, including in Why We Sleep, that the World Health Organization (WHO) had declared "a global sleep loss epidemic." The WHO denied his claim, and Walker subsequently conceded that his assertion had been "misremembered," and was actually attributable to a claim from the Centers for Disease Control and Prevention in 2014.

Walker failed to disclose that numerous meta-analyses involving over four million adults found the lowest mortality was associated with seven hours of sleep, and that the increased risk of death associated with sleeping more than seven hours was significantly greater than the risk of sleeping less than seven hours as defined by a J-shaped curve. Psychologist Stuart J. Ritchie criticised Walker's approach in his book. "Walker could have written a far more cautious book that limited itself to just what the data shows, but perhaps such a book wouldn't have sold so many copies or been hailed as an intervention that 'should change science and medicine.'"

Walker posted his responses to the above criticisms in 2019 on his blog.

== Media ==
In 2018 Walker was a guest on The Joe Rogan Experience

In 2019 Walker gave a TED talk entitled "Sleep is your superpower". Markus Loecher, Professor for Mathematics and Statistics at Berlin School of Economics and Law criticised its claims and the veracity of its facts.

Walker has a short-form podcast, The Matt Walker Podcast, focusing on sleep, the brain, and the body.

=== Article retraction ===
An article written by Walker published in Neuron in August 2019 was retracted in July 2020, at the request of the author, after it was found to have considerable overlap with an article he had previously published in The Lancet.
