= Why We Sleep =

2017 book by Matthew Walker

Why We Sleep: The New Science of Sleep and Dreams
- First edition (UK)
- Author: Matthew Walker
- Language: English
- Genre: Science book
- Published: 3 October 2017
- Publisher: Allen Lane (UK), Scribner (US)
- Pages: 368
- ISBN: 978-0-241-26906-0 (hardcover)

Why We Sleep: The New Science of Sleep and Dreams is a 2017 popular science book about sleep written by Matthew Walker, from England, who is a professor of neuroscience and psychology and the director of the Center for Human Sleep Science at the University of California, Berkeley. In the book, Walker discusses the importance of sleeping, the side effects of failing to do so, and its impact on society.

The book asserts that sleep deprivation is linked to numerous fatal diseases, including dementia.

Why We Sleep became a New York Times and Sunday Times bestseller. The book received generally positive reviews from mainstream critics, while also garnering criticism from academics for making broad or unfounded claims and alarmism.

== Background ==
According to Walker, who had never written a book at the time, he was motivated to write the book after an encounter with a woman who glanced at his work related to sleep and its benefits for health, stating, "When that comes out, I want to read it". Walker described this encounter as a sincere "independent ratification" that made him write the book. The book took Walker roughly four and a half years to write. Walker and his team spent roughly 20 years studying the rejuvenating ability sleep has. Walker's communication style, in which he makes use of "metaphors and analogies effectively", allowed him to explain ideas related to sleep in detail.

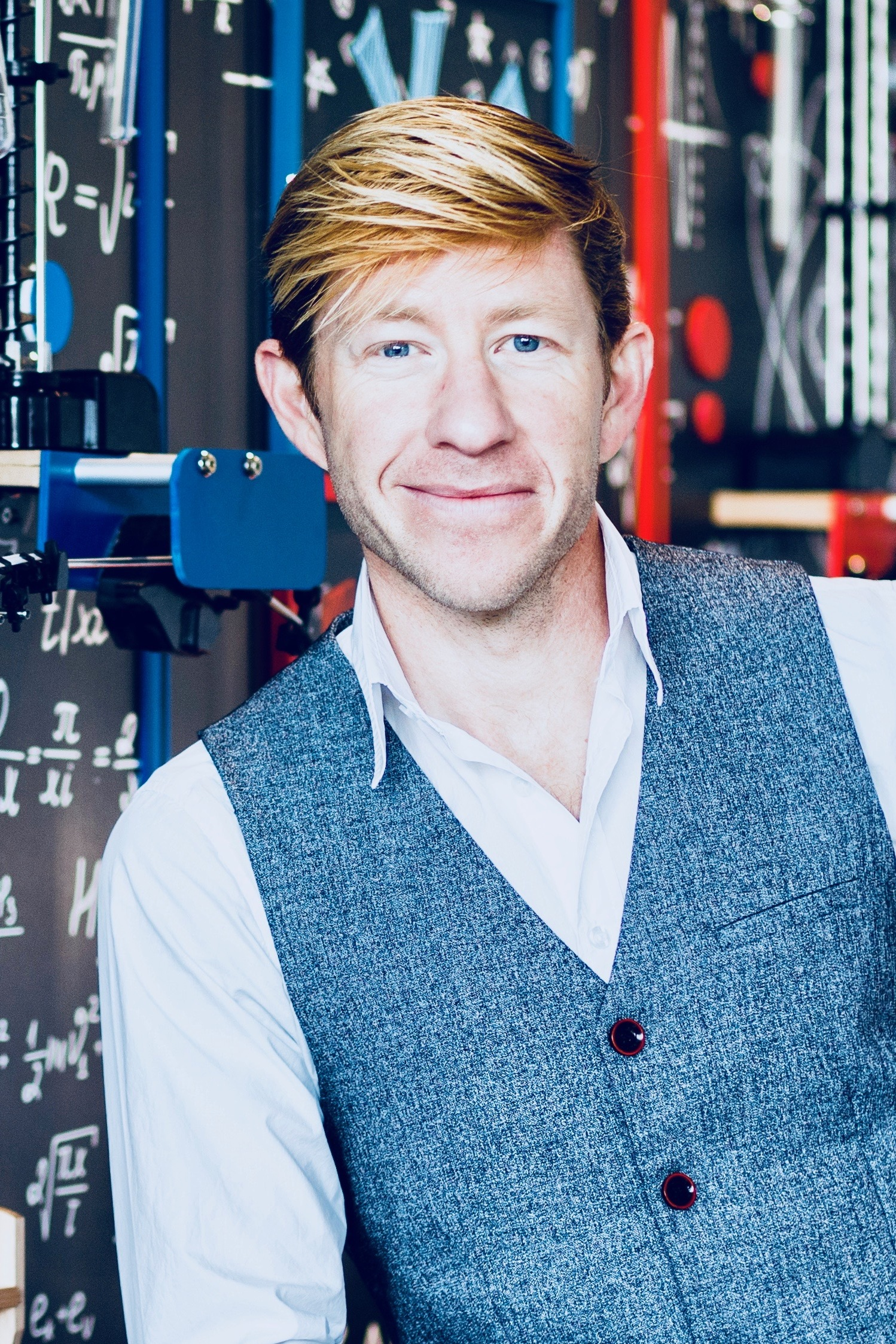
An image of Matthew Walker, the author of Why We Sleep

At 18 years of age, Walker, who was a medical student at the time, became an "accidental sleep researcher" and moved over to studying neuroscience because of his habit of asking many questions. It was during his PhD at London's Medical Research Council when Walker learned about how little information there was on sleep. A scientific paper helped Walker with his research after his failure to determine the differences of brainwave activity between various dementia found in people, with the paper's contents describing the areas of the brain each variant of dementia attacks. It was then Walker realized that in order to measure his patients' brainwave patterns properly, they need to be asleep. Walker spent six months teaching himself how to set up his sleep laboratory, which allowed him to voice his findings on sleep differences amongst his patients.

Walker noted that many people misinterpret the amount of sleep they actually receive, likely caused by deep thought during the light sleep phases. Following the release of the book, Walker went on to describe his book as having the potential to make readers sleep and jokingly admitted to being concerned to hear if his book kept people awake at night.

== Contents ==
The book is written from a neuroscientific view, mainly devoted to discussing the impact of sleep on the functions of the human brain. It is divided into four parts, focusing on how sleep works, its benefits, the reason for dreams and sleep issues surrounding society. The book is written so that it does not need to be read sequentially. Walker discusses the effects of the widespread loss of sleep, with the goal for readers to endeavour to achieve eight hours of sleep once they learn about the connection of sleep loss to other health issues, such as Alzheimer's disease. Also explained by Walker is why adults who sleep for less than 6 hours at the age of 40 and over have a higher chance of suffering a cardiac arrest or a stroke during their lifetime.

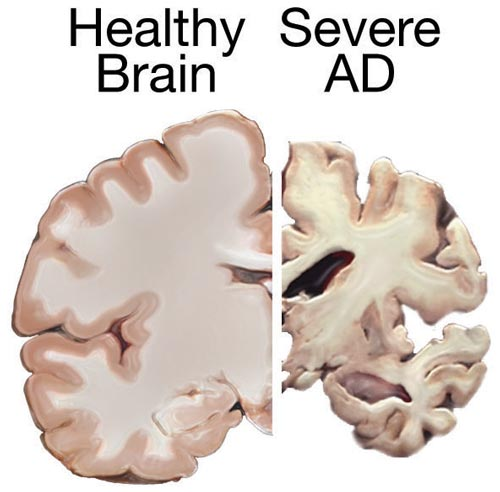
Alzheimer's disease, according to Walker in his book, has a connection to sleep loss.

"Sleep pressure and circadian rhythms", the driving forces and the framework of sleep, are brought up in the book. Other sleep behaviors, such as rapid eye movement sleep (REM) and non-rapid eye movement sleep (NREM), and the impact sleep has on "synaptic pruning" and the creation of memories during a human's lifespan are also covered. REM and NREM are further explained as the two sleeping basics, with 5 cycles present in a good night sleep. The book mentions "morning types" and "evening types" of people, with Walker writing about how spending less time sleeping benefited human predecessors who slept in groups due to being safer.

The book emphasises the significance of having a good night's sleep without a feeling of uneasiness, or guilt of laziness. Walker defines insomnia as a disorder usually related to an overwrought, commiserating nervous system that's usually caused by being anxious. He goes on to address the PTSD victims' nightmares, stating that their dreams' ability to heal them by easing the emotions connected to a distressing memory, is affected by a larger quantity of noradrenaline being created. Walker also believes that dreams carry information regarding fundamental emotions, while admitting that they can be quite apparent, resulting in no explanations required to describe them.

The values of sleep and the consequences of sleep deprivation are also brought up. One particular research was conducted where people volunteered to sleep for only six hours in a span of 10 nights. This resulted in the volunteers being "cognitively impaired" along with their brains being heavily damaged, regardless of the three week eight-hour sleep schedule they received later. Actions carried out by sleep-deprived people, such as answering emails at every hour of a day, are brought to question in the book. Walker wrote that research proves that sleeping after studying allows for "memory, integration and retention benefits" to occur. He further wrote that sleeping has the ability to retain memories and amend the abilities of human learning. Many organizations who value creativity, productiveness and resilient workers, give them a "sleep bonus", with the amount of extra sleep received being determined through electronic monitoring. Walker noted that companies are changing their workplaces by allowing more "flexible working" and comfort zones for people to rest.

Walker's research on what impacts sleep is discussed, with temperature's influence being one. A five-step guideline is included that explains how to prevent "self-euthanasia" due to missing sleep. The guideline also brings up "individual-level transformation" and a reformation of society. The book teaches the basics of the neurological and biological function of sleep. The impact of caffeine on sleep is in the book, with Walker noting its effects on the adenosine that allows people to fall asleep. It is further explained that caffeine takes more time to exit the body as we age, with younger people having the ability to break caffeine down faster.

Walker wrote the book in a "reader-friendly" way in areas such as discussing neuroscientific techniques and how they were created. The book ends with Walker's advice for better sleep through 12 tips, with one of them to have a single eight-to-nine hour period of sleep.

== Critical reception ==
Why We Sleep has garnered a generally positive reception from critics. The book would go on to make Walker famous in his field of expertise. The book became an international bestseller, including a #1 on the Sunday Times Bestseller in the UK, and a #8 on the New York Times Bestseller. It received numerous other reviews, including the Guardian, BBC, NPR, Financial Times, UC Berkeley and Kirkus Reviews. Critics praised the book for Walker's convincing studies on the importance of sleep and its impact on society.

Seithikurippu R. Pandi-Perumal praised Walker's structuring of the book, calling it informative, organised and intelligibly written while noting its informative yet reader-friendly nature. In a review from Bill Gates, he noted that the book teaches about the importance of sleeping, despite some points in the book not being convincing. He also noted that the book aided him in sleeping better, pointing out that it took a longer time to finish the book as he followed Walker's word on putting the book down to go to sleep. Kylie O'Brien's review described the book as "beautifully written" and filled with scientific facts that clarifies the question its title asks.

A review by Christopher Torrens in The Physiological Society described the book as informative and helpful, noting the book's evidence related to the consequences of having little to no sleep. He praised the book's style and formatting of being able to be read "from cover to cover or by cherry-picking chapters in whatever order you choose". Ruth Armstrong wrote that the book was loaded with recent research towards sleep, noting the change in his sleeping patterns.

Criticism surrounding the book involved concern about statistical errors in the book and the alarmism it generated in some readers. A review from Alexey Guzey, an independent researcher, criticized the book in an essay entitled Matthew Walker's "Why We Sleep" Is Riddled with Scientific and Factual Errors. The criticism was discussed on the BBC series More or Less. Guzey's criticism was also discussed by Andrew Gelman, a statistician at Columbia University. In a later post on Columbia's statistics blog, Gelman indicated that Walker's purported removal of a bar from a graph could be a "smoking gun," commenting that it entered "research misconduct" territory. Walker posted his responses to these and other criticisms in 2019 on his own blog.

The book's failure to answer its own title 'Why We Sleep' has been criticised, with renowned sleep researcher William Dement commenting that people only need sleep due to the sleepiness accumulated. Anu Valtonen found fault in the book naming neuroscience as "the science that provides the knowledge of sleep and dreams" and its overlooking of other disciplinary areas related to sleep. She also criticised the book for lacking certain information on sleep, such as the "social aspects" of sleep or "socio-historical" route of sleep hygiene. Rosa Breed criticised Walker's lack of references when writing the book, noting that there was no proof in certain statements made by him, such as Walker's suggestion of sleeping for eight hours as a necessity. Jonathan Hawken felt that some of the book's contents were rather selective, criticising the book's lack of in-depth analysis towards the effect of sleep apnea.

== Controversies ==
The book has spawned controversy related to Walker's belief that the amount of sleep received worldwide has decreased. A researcher on sleep, Jim Horne, disagreed with the idea regarding how people are weighed down by a lack of sleep and that everybody was required to sleep for at least eight hours. Bill Gates wrote that he did not "buy into" Walker's claim that sleep and Alzheimer's disease have a strong connection to each other. Anu Valtonen voiced her concern regarding the speculation the book makes when taking a neuroscientific stance on the main insights into how sleep and dreams function.

Some critics felt that Walker's way of writing made the book feel similar to a horror story. Rosa Breed felt that some ideas brought up by Walker in the book were thought to be disturbing, noting Walker's suggestion for having people's sleeping behaviours be measured by "health insurance companies" to be prying. Some of Walker's claims were based on laboratory studies without supporting real-world evidence, making them questionable to critics.
