= Thumb sucking =

Behavior where a person uses their mouth to suck on their thumb

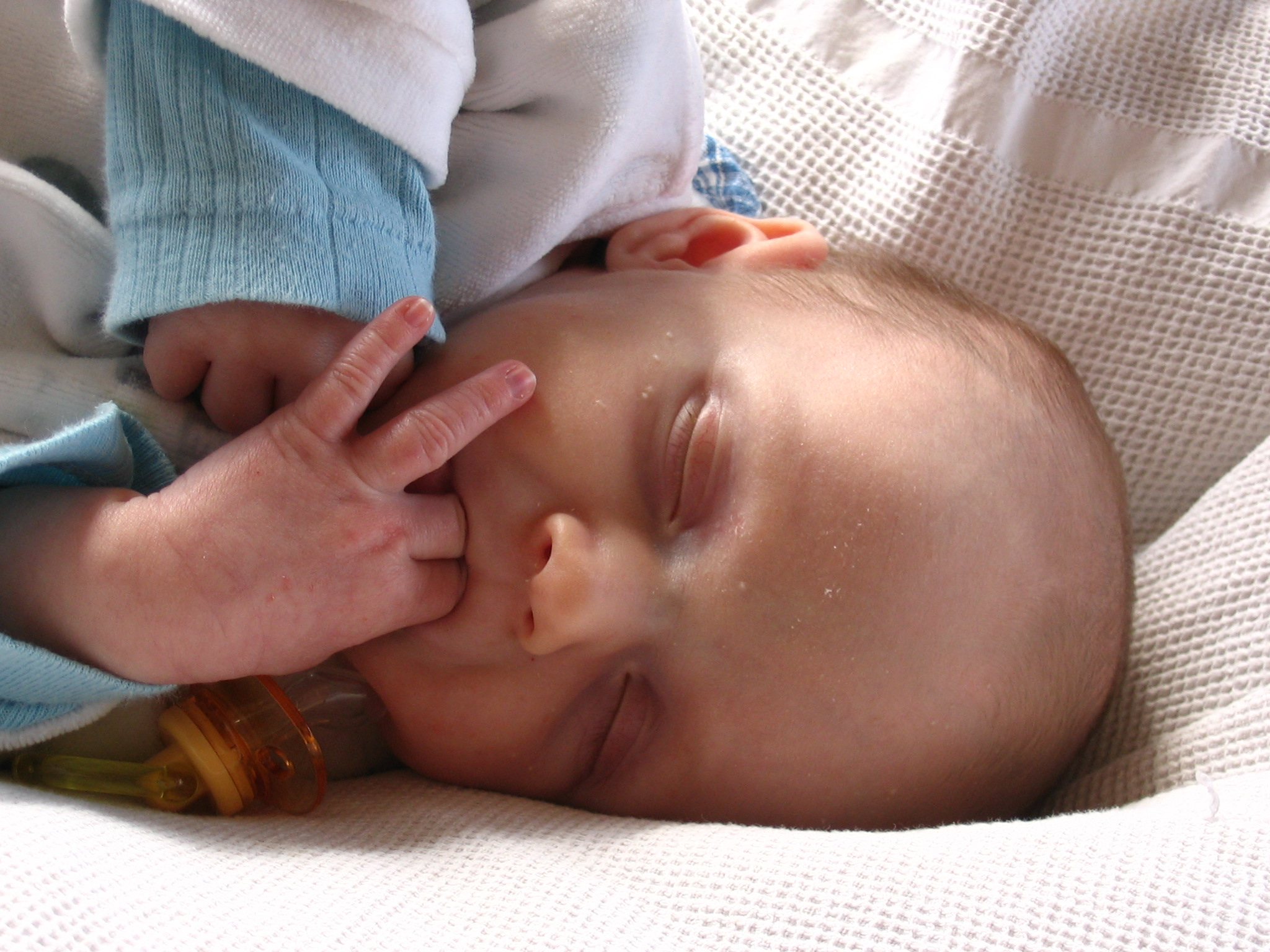
Infants may use pacifiers or their thumb or fingers to soothe themselves

Newborn baby thumb sucking

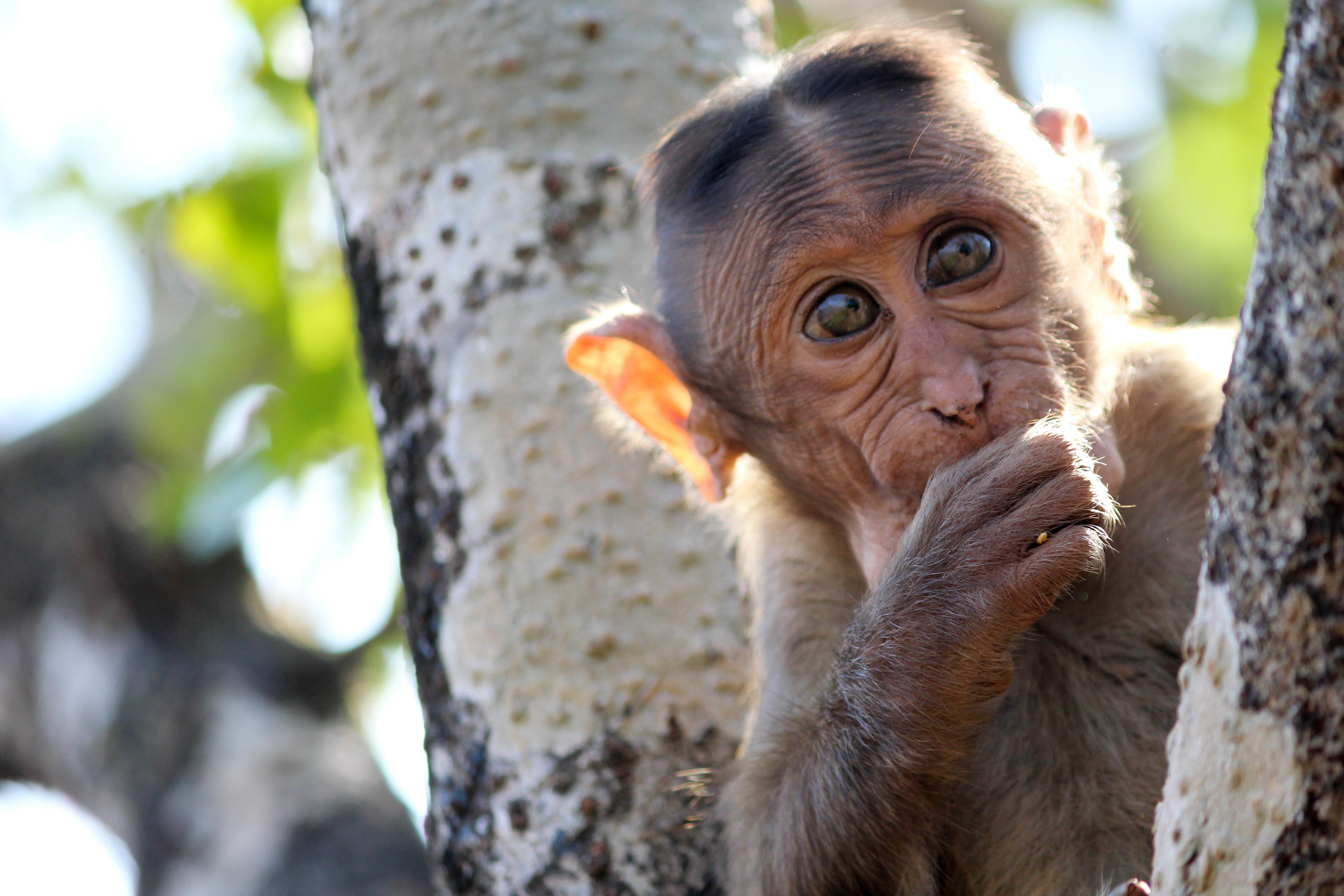
A bonnet macaque thumb sucking

Thumb sucking is a behavior found in humans, chimpanzees, captive ring-tailed lemurs, and other primates. It usually involves placing the thumb into the mouth and rhythmically repeating sucking contact for a prolonged duration. It can also be accomplished with any organ within reach (such as other fingers and toes) and is considered to be soothing and therapeutic for the person. As a child develops the habit, it will usually develop a "favourite" finger to suck on.

At birth, a baby will reflexively suck any object placed in its mouth; this is the sucking reflex responsible for breastfeeding. From the first time they engage in nutritive feeding, infants learn that the habit can not only provide valuable nourishment, but also a great deal of pleasure, comfort, and warmth. Whether from a mother, bottle, or pacifier, this behavior, over time, begins to become associated with a very strong, self-soothing, and pleasurable oral sensation. As the child grows older, and is eventually weaned off the nutritional sucking, they can either develop alternative means for receiving those same feelings of physical and emotional fulfillment, or they can continue experiencing those pleasantly soothing experiences by beginning to suck their thumbs or fingers. This reflex disappears at about 4 months of age; thumb sucking is not purely an instinctive behavior and therefore can last much longer. Moreover, ultrasound scans have revealed that thumb sucking can start before birth, as early as 15 weeks from conception; whether this behavior is voluntary or due to random movements of the fetus in the womb is not conclusively known.

Thumb sucking generally stops by the age of 4 years. Some older children will retain the habit, which can cause severe dental problems. While most dentists would recommend breaking the habit as early as possible, it has been shown that as long as the habit is broken before the onset of permanent teeth, at around 5 years old, the damage is reversible. Thumb sucking is sometimes retained into adulthood and may simply be due to habit continuation. Using anatomical and neurophysiological data a study has found that sucking the thumb is said to stimulate receptors within the brain which cause the release of mental and physical tension.

== Dental problems and prevention ==
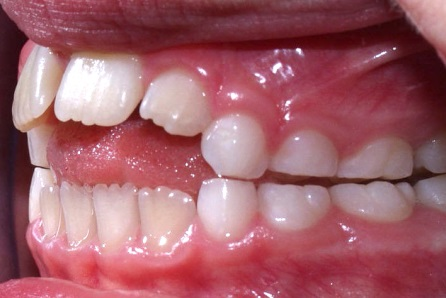
Alveolar prognathism, caused by thumb sucking and tongue thrusting in a 7-year-old girl.

Percentage of children who suck their thumbs (data from two researchers)

Age	Kantorowicz	Brückl
0–1	92%	66%
1–2	93%	66%
2–3	87%	–
3–4	86%	25%
4–5	85%	25%
5–6	76%	25%
Over 6	—	9%

Most children stop sucking on thumbs, pacifiers or other objects on their own between 2 and 4 years of age. No harm is done to their teeth or jaws until permanent teeth start to erupt. The only time it might cause concern is if it goes on beyond 6 to 8 years of age. At this time, it may affect the shape of the oral cavity or dentition. During thumbsucking the tongue sits in a lowered position and so no longer balances the forces from the buccal group of musculature. This results in narrowing of the upper arch and a posterior crossbite. Thumbsucking can also cause the maxillary central incisors to tip labially and the mandibular incisors to tip lingually, resulting in an increased overjet and anterior open bite malocclusion, as the thumb rests on them during the course of sucking. In addition to proclination of the maxillary incisors, mandibular incisors retrusion will also happen. Transverse maxillary deficiency gives rise to posterior crossbite, ultimately leading to a Class II malocclusion.

Children may experience difficulty in swallowing and speech patterns due to the adverse changes. Aside from the damaging physical aspects of thumb sucking, there are also additional risks, which are present at all ages. These include increased risk of infection from communicable diseases, due to the simple fact that non-sterile thumbs are covered with infectious agents, as well as many social implications. Some children experience social difficulties, as often children are taunted by their peers for engaging in what they can consider to be an "immature" habit. This taunting often results the child being rejected by the group or being subjected to ridicule by their peers, which can cause understandable psychological stress.

Methods to stop sucking habits are divided into 2 categories: Preventive Therapy and Appliance Therapy.

Examples to prevent their children from sucking their thumbs include the use of bitterants or piquant substances on their child's hands—although this is not a procedure encouraged by the American Dental Association or the Association of Pediatric Dentists. Some suggest that positive reinforcements or calendar rewards be given to encourage the child to stop sucking their thumb.

The American Dental Association recommends:

- Praise children for not sucking, instead of scolding them when they do.
- If a child is sucking their thumb when feeling insecure or needing comfort, focus instead on correcting the cause of the anxiety and provide comfort to your child.
- If a child is sucking on their thumb because of boredom, try getting the child's attention with a fun activity.
- Involve older children in the selection of a means to cease thumb sucking.
- The pediatric dentist can offer encouragement to the child and explain what could happen to the child's teeth if he/she does not stop sucking.
- Only if these tips are ineffective, remind the child of the habit by bandaging the thumb or putting a sock/glove on the hand at night.
- Other orthodontics for appliances are available.

The British Orthodontic Society recommends the same advice as ADA.

A Cochrane review was conducted to review the effectiveness of a variety of clinical interventions for stopping thumb-sucking. The study showed that orthodontic appliances and psychological interventions (positive and negative reinforcement) were successful at preventing thumb sucking in both the short and long term, compared to no treatment. Psychological interventions such as habit reversal training and decoupling have also proven useful in body focused repetitive behaviors.

Clinical studies have shown that appliances such as TGuards can be 90% effective in breaking the thumb or finger sucking habit. Rather than use bitterants or piquants, which are not endorsed by the ADA due to their causing of discomfort or pain, TGuards break the habit simply by removing the suction responsible for generating the feelings of comfort and nurture. Other appliances are available, such as fabric thumb guards, each having their own benefits and features depending on the child's age, willpower and motivation. Fixed intraoral appliances have been known to create problems during eating as children when removing their appliances may have a risk of breaking them. Children with mental illness may have reduced compliance.

Some studies mention the use of extra-oral habit reminder appliance to treat thumb sucking. An alarm is triggered when the child tries to suck the thumb to stop the child from this habit. However, more studies are required to prove the effectiveness of external devices on thumb sucking.

== Children's books ==
- In Heinrich Hoffmann's Struwwelpeter, the "thumb-sucker" Konrad is punished by having both of his thumbs cut off.
- There are several children's books on the market with the intention to help the child break the habit of thumb sucking. Most of them provide a story the child can relate to and some coping strategies. Experts recommend to use only books in which the topic of thumb sucking is shown in a positive and respectful way.

== See also ==
- Stereotypic movement disorder
- Prognathism
