= Orofacial myofunctional disorders =

Muscle disorder

Orofacial myofunctional disorders (OMD) (sometimes called “oral myofunctional disorder", and “tongue thrust”) are muscle disorders of the face, mouth, lips, or jaw due to chronic mouth breathing.

Recent studies on the incidence and prevalence of tongue thrust behaviors are not available. However, according to previous research, 38% of various populations have OMD. The incidence is as high as 81% in children exhibiting speech/articulation problems (Kellum, 1992).

== Indications ==
OMD refers to the abnormal resting posture of the orofacial musculature, atypical chewing, and swallowing patterns, dental malocclusions, blocked nasal airways, and speech problems. OMD are patterns involving oral and/or orofacial musculature that interferes with normal growth, development, or function of structures, or calls attention to itself. OMD are found in both children and adults. OMD that are commonly seen in children include tongue thrust that is also known as swallowing with an anterior tongue posture. OMD also refers to factors such as nonnutritive sucking behaviors, such as thumb sucking, clenching, bruxing, etc. that led to abnormal development of dentition and oral cavity. OMD in adult and geriatric populations are due to various neurological impairments, oral hygiene, altered functioning of muscles due to aging, systemic diseases, etc.

Tongue thrusting is a type of orofacial myofunctional disorder, which is defined as habitual resting or thrusting the tongue forward and/or sideways against or between the teeth while swallowing, chewing, resting, or speaking. Abnormal swallowing patterns push the upper teeth forward and away from the upper alveolar processes and cause open bites. In children, tongue thrusting is common due to immature oral behavior, narrow dental arch, prolonged upper respiratory tract infections, spaces between the teeth (diastema), muscle weakness, malocclusion, abnormal sucking habits, and open mouth posture due to structural abnormalities of genetic origin. Large tonsils and adenoids also contribute to tongue thrust swallowing.

From the dental perspective, teeth move in relation to the balance of the soft tissue; the normal relationship of teeth lies in occlusion; and any deviation from the normal occlusion can lead to dental distress. Tongue posture plays an important role in swallowing and dentofacial growth. In case of tongue thrust swallowing, the tip of the tongue can come against or between the dentition; the midpoint may be collapsed or extended unilaterally or bilaterally; or the posterior part of the hard palate. In these conditions, there are chances of abnormal dentofacial growth and other concerns regarding the development of the craniofacial complex.

There are pertinent symptomatic questions that can be considered for the diagnosis of tongue thrust swallow. Some of these questions are geared toward tongue protrusion and an opening of lips when the client is in repose; habitual mouth breathing; digit sucking; existence of high and narrow palatal arch; ankyloglossia (tongue-tie); malocclusions, (Class II, III); weak chewing muscles (masseter); weak lip muscles (orbicularis oris); overdeveloped chin muscles (mentalis); muscular imbalance; abnormal dentition.

Tongue thrusting and speech problems may co-occur. Due to unconventional postures of the tongue and other articulators, interdental and frontal lisping are very common. The alveolar sounds /s/ and /z/ are produced more anteriorly thus leading to interdental fricative like sounds, /th/.

== Causes ==
1. Upper airway constrictions (e.g., deviated nasal septum) or obstructions (e.g., enlarged tonsils) or infections (e.g., rhinitis)
2. General hypotonia or low body tone
3. Low-lying resting posture of the tongue
4. Imbalance in dental growth
5. Inadequate development of facial and cranial bones
6. Inappropriate development of muscles in the head and neck areas

While identifying the causes of tongue thrust, it is important to remember that the resting posture of the tongue, jaw, and lips are crucial to the normal development of the mouth and its structures. If the tongue rests against the upper front teeth, the teeth may protrude forward, and adverse tongue pressure can restrict the development of the oral cavity. The tongue lies low in the mouth or oral cavity and is typically forwarded between upper and lower teeth. If tongue thrust behavior is not corrected, it may affect the normal dental development. The teeth may be pushed around in different directions during the growth of permanent teeth.

== Consequences of tongue thrust ==
1. Lisping (e.g., saying “thun” for sun)
2. Imprecise articulation of speech sounds
3. Open-mouth posture
4. Open bite
5. Abnormal eruption of teeth and dental arch
6. Abnormal tone of facial muscles
7. Prolonged meal times due to ineffective chewing and swallowing
8. Spillage of food/fluid from the anterior mouth
9. Negative cosmetic effects
10. Lower self-esteem
11. Problems with the fitting of dentures in future

== Open mouth posture ==
The adaptation from nasal to mouth breathing takes place when changes such as chronic middle ear infections, sinusitis, allergic rhinitis, upper airway infections, and sleep disturbances (e.g., snoring) take place. In addition, mouth breathing is often associated with a decrease in oxygen intake into the lungs. Mouth breathing can particularly affect the growing face, as the abnormal pull of these muscle groups on facial bones slowly deforms these bones, causing misalignment. The earlier in life these changes take place, the greater the alterations in facial growth, and ultimately an open mouth posture is created where the upper lip is raised and the lower jaw is maintained in an open posture. The tongue, which is normally tucked under the roof of the mouth, drops to the floor of the mouth and protrudes to allow a greater volume of air intake. Consequently, an open mouth posture can lead to malocclusions and problems in swallowing. Other causes of open-mouth posture are the weakness of lip muscles, overall lack of tone in the body or hypotonia, and prolonged/chronic allergies of the respiratory tract.

== Treatment ==
An orofacial myofunctional therapist reeducates the movement of muscles including teaching the client how to breathe properly, restore correct swallowing patterns, and establish adequate labial-lingual postures. An interdisciplinary nature of treatment is always desirable to reach functional goals in terms of swallowing, speech, and other aesthetic factors. A team approach has been shown to be effective in correcting orofacial myofunctional disorders. The teams include an orthodontist, dental hygienist, certified orofacial myologist, general dentist, otorhinolaryngologist, and a speech-language pathologist.

=== Goals/benefits of therapy ===
1. Eliminate mouth breathing and open-mouth posture
2. Improve nasal breathing patterns
3. Reinforce and establish a resting posture of the tongue away from the teeth, against the hard palate
4. Establish appropriate oral, lingual, and facial muscle patterns that promote correct gestures for chewing and eating
5. Retrain oral, lingual, and facial muscles to facilitate correct resting posture of tongue, lips, and jaw
6. Establish mature swallowing patterns
7. Prevent relapses after orthodontic treatment
8. Improve the relationship between dental arches; reduce open bite and overjet
9. Maintain overall facial muscle tone needed for chewing, swallowing, and speech
10. Create an oral environment that creates favorable conditions for the development of dentition
11. Eliminate dry mouth condition or xerostomia
12. Improve oral hygiene
13. Eliminate digit-sucking behaviors to facilitate normal growth of the palatal arch

== See also ==
- Breath: The New Science of a Lost Art
- Mouth breathing
- Obligate nasal breathing
