= Mouth breathing =

Breathing method in humans

Mouth Breathing
- Other names: Chronic oral ventilation
- Symptoms: Snoring, dry mouth, hoarse voice, bad breath, fatigue, sleep apnea
- Causes: Chronic nasal congestion
- Treatment: Treatment of the underlying cause of nasal congestion if present, building a habit to breathe through the nose

Mouth breathing, medically known as chronic oral ventilation, is long-term breathing through the mouth. It often is caused by an obstruction to breathing through the nose, the innate breathing organ in the human body. However, by the early 20th century, the term "mouth-breather" had developed a pejorative slang meaning in the United States connoting a stupid person.

== Etymology ==
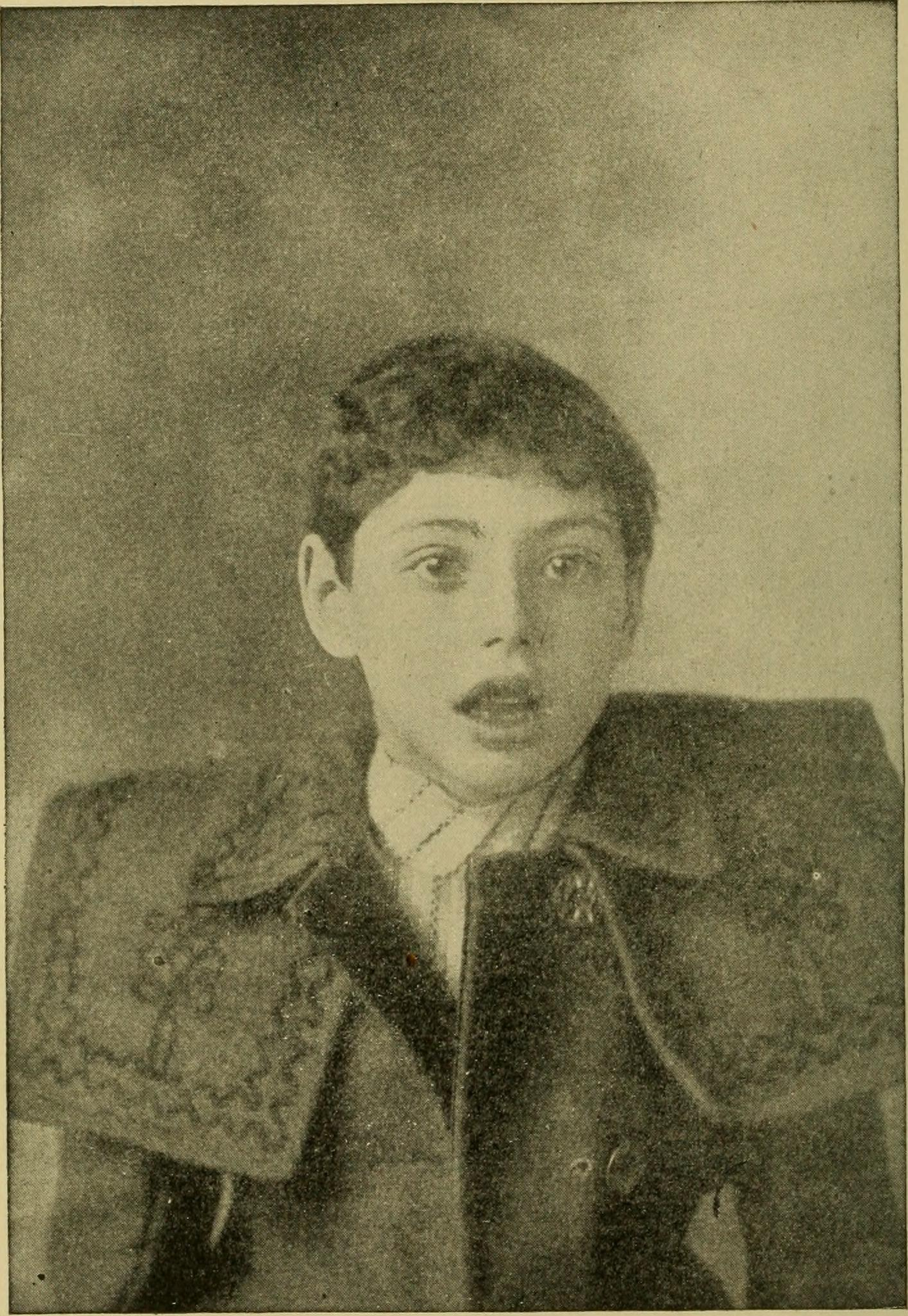
Image 23 from the 1903 book by William F. Barry, M.D., The Hygiene of the Schoolroom. Barry describes this child as having "the typical face of a mouth-breather".

In the early 20th century, "mouth-breather" was a technical term used by doctors to describe children who were breathing through their mouths due to an underlying medical condition. English lexicographer Jonathon Green notes that by 1915, the phrase "mouth-breather" had developed a pejorative connotation within English slang, defined as a "stupid person." Currently, the Oxford English Dictionary notes that the term "mouth-breather" is "North American Slang" used to denote "A stupid person."

== Causes ==
In about 85% of cases, it is an adaptation to nasal congestion, which may lead to mouth breathing during sleep. More specialized causes include: antrochoanal polyps; a short upper lip which prevents the lips from meeting at rest (lip incompetence); and pregnancy rhinitis, which tends to occur in the third trimester of pregnancy.

== Potential effects ==
Chronic mouth breathing may trigger a localized immune response in the upper airway. The nasal passage regulates airflow, temperature, humidity, and microbial filtration Mouth breathing increases direct exposure of the nasopharyngeal mucosa to irritants and pathogens. This results in additional mechanical and immunological stress on the tissue. The increased stress may promote inflammation and hypertrophy of adenoid tissue, secondary lymphoid organs central to mucosal immunity, which are rich in T cells and IgA - producing B cells. As the adenoids enlarge, they can obstruct airflow and worsen sleep quality by contributing to snoring or sleep-disordered breathing, while the reduced efficiency of nasal filtration continues to increase pathogen exposure Repeated stimulation from unconditioned airflow can sustain adenoid activation and enlargement, potentially creating a cycle of immune-driven chronic mouthbreathing

The impact of chronic mouth breathing on health is a research area within orthodontics (and the related field of myofunctional therapy) and anthropology. It is classified into three types: obstructive, habitual, and anatomic.

There is a noted order of cause and effect leading to airway dysfunction related to mouth breathing. This first starts with an inflammatory reaction then leading to tissue growth in the area which leads to airway obstruction and mouth breathing and then finally an altered face structure.

Nasal breathing produces nitric oxide within the body, while mouth breathing does not. In addition, the Boston Medical Center notes that the nose filters out particles that enter the body, humidifies the air we breathe and warms it to body temperature. In contrast, however, mouth breathing "pulls all pollution and germs directly into the lungs; dry cold air in the lungs makes the secretions thick, slows the cleaning cilia, and slows down the passage of oxygen into the bloodstream". As a result, chronic mouth breathing may lead to illness.

Conditions associated with mouth breathing include cheilitis glandularis, anterior open bite, tongue thrusting habit, cerebral palsy, ADHD, sleep apnea, and snoring. In addition, gingivitis, gingival enlargement, and increased levels of dental plaque are common in persons who chronically breathe through their mouths. The usual effect on the gums is sharply confined to the anterior maxillary region, especially the incisors (the upper teeth at the front). The appearance is erythematous (red), edematous (swollen) and shiny. This region receives the greatest exposure to airflow during mouth breathing, and it is thought that the inflammation and irritation is related to surface dehydration, but in animal experimentation, repeated air drying of the gums did not create such an appearance.

Breathing through the mouth decreases saliva flow. Saliva has minerals to help neutralize bacteria, clean off the teeth, and rehydrate the tissues. Without it, the risk of gum disease and cavities increases.

Chronic mouth breathing in children may affect dental and facial growth. It may also lead to the development of a long, narrow face, sometimes termed long face syndrome. Conversely, it has been suggested that a long thin face type, with corresponding thin nasopharyngeal airway, predisposes to nasal obstruction and mouth breathing.

== Additional approaches to mouth breathing ==
=== George Catlin ===
George Catlin was a 19th-century American painter, author, and traveler, who specialized in portraits of Native Americans in the Old West. Travelling to the American West five times during the 1830s, he wrote about, and painted portraits that depicted, the life of the Plains Indians. He was also the author of several books, including The Breath of Life (later retitled as Shut Your Mouth and Save Your Life) in 1862. It was based on his experiences traveling through the West, where he observed a consistent lifestyle habit among the Native American communities he encountered: a preference for nose breathing over mouth breathing. He also observed that they had perfectly straight teeth. He repeatedly heard that this was because they believed that mouth breathing made an individual weak and caused disease, while nasal breathing made the body strong and prevented disease. He also observed that mothers repeatedly closed the mouth of their infants while they were sleeping, to instill nasal breathing as a habit.

=== Yoga ===
Yogis such as B. K. S. Iyengar advocated both inhaling and exhaling through the nose in the practice of yoga, rather than inhaling through the nose and exhaling through the mouth, using the phrase, "the nose is for breathing, the mouth is for eating."

=== Mouth taping ===
Mouth taping is the practice of keeping the lips shut while sleeping with a strip of surgical tape. This is intended to prevent mouth breathing during sleep. The health effects of mouth taping have been little researched.

== In non-human animals ==
Lambs are noted to only switch to mouth breathing when the nasal passages are completely obstructed, with hypoxaemia having developed also as a result.

== See also ==
- Control of ventilation – Breathing control
- Nasal congestion – Partial or complete blockage of nasal passages
- Nasal septum deviation – Disorder of the nose
- Obligate nasal breathing
- Rhinoplasty – Surgical procedure to enhance or reconstruct a human nose
