= Obligate nasal breathing =

Obligate nasal breathing describes a physiological instinct to breathe through the nose (or other forms of external nasal passages, depending on the species) as opposed to breathing through the mouth.

== Definition ==
The term may be misleading, as it implies that the organism has no choice but to breathe through its nose; however, it is also used to describe cases where effective breathing through the mouth is possible but not preferred. Alternatively, the term has been defined by some as the ability to breathe through the nose while swallowing. While this ability is a common trait of obligate nasal breathers, the definition does not require that nasal breathing is necessary for the animal. Even in obligate nasal breathers such as horses, rabbits, and rodents, there is a potential patent path for air to travel from the mouth to the lungs which can be used for endotracheal intubation. It has been suggested that obligate nasal breathing is an adaptation especially useful in prey species, as it allows an animal to feed while preserving their ability to detect predators by scent.

== Animals ==
Horses are considered obligate nasal breathers. The respiratory system of the horse prevents horses from breathing orally. The epiglottis rests above the soft palate while the animal is not swallowing, forming an airtight seal. Oral breathing can only occur with significant anatomical abnormalities or pathological conditions. For example, denervation of the pharyngeal branch of the vagus nerve results in the dorsal displacement of the soft palate (DDSP), and it has been suggested that this leads to a clinical syndrome which may include oral breathing. However, significant respiratory dysfunction including airway obstruction is observed with DDSP, and the animal cannot function normally in this state.

Rabbits and rodents are also obligate nasal breathers. Like horses, the normal anatomical position of the epiglottis causes it to be engaged over the caudal rim of the soft palate, sealing the oral pharynx from the lower airways. Air entering the mouth will not fully make it to the lungs. Even so, rabbits with advanced upper airway disease will attempt to breathe through their mouths.

Many other mammals, such as adult dogs and humans, have the ability to breathe indefinitely through either the oral or nasal cavity. Cats are preferential nasal breathers.

== Humans ==
Some doctors claim that humans have evolved to breathe through the nose from birth. This is because it is the job of the nose to filter out all of the particles that enter the body, as well as to humidify the air we breathe and warm it to body temperature. In addition, nasal breathing produces nitric oxide within the body while mouth breathing does not. Mouth breathing also leads to dry mouth, throat infections, a reduced sense of taste, and other chronic conditions. Nasal breathing is a research interest in orthodontics (and the related field of myofunctional therapy) and for biological anthropologists.

=== Infants ===
Human infants are commonly described as obligate nasal breathers as they breathe through their nose rather than the mouth. Most infants, however, are able to breathe through their mouth if their nose is blocked. There are however certain infants with conditions such as choanal atresia in which deaths have resulted from nasal obstruction. In these cases, there are cyclical periods of cyanosis. The infant initially attempts to breathe through the nose, and is unable to; hypercapnia occurs, and many babies instinctively begin to cry. While crying, oral ventilation occurs and cyanosis subsides. There is variation in the length of time until a baby begins oral breathing, and some will never cease attempts at nasal breathing. It has also been suggested that infants may not be able to sustain oral breathing for significant lengths of time, because of the weakness of the muscles required to seal the nasal airway and open the oral airway. One study employing monitored anatomical occlusion concluded that human infants are not obligate nasal breathers: its sample of nineteen infants, ranging in age from 1 day to 7.5 months, reliably transitioned from nose to mouth breathing after nasal occlusion, providing evidence that infants possess the physiological capability to mouth breathe.

=== Exercise ===
Some authors argue that nasal breathing offers a greater advantage over mouth breathing during exercise.

== Additional people and activities ==
=== George Catlin ===
George Catlin was a 19th-century American painter, author, and traveler, who specialized in portraits of Native Americans in the Old West. Travelling to the American West five times during the 1830s, he wrote about the life of the Plains Indians, and painted portraits that depicted them. He was also the author of several books, including The Breath of Life (later retitled as Shut Your Mouth and Save Your Life) in 1862. It was based on his experiences traveling through the West, where he observed a consistent lifestyle habit among the Native American communities he encountered: a preference for nose breathing over mouth breathing. He also observed that they had perfectly straight teeth. He repeatedly heard that this was because they believed that mouth breathing made an individual weak and caused disease, while nasal breathing made the body strong and prevented disease. He also observed that mothers repeatedly closed the mouth of their infants while they were sleeping, to instill nasal breathing as a habit.

=== Yoga ===
Yogis such as B. K. S. Iyengar advocate both inhaling and exhaling through the nose in the practice of yoga, rather than inhaling through the nose and exhaling through the mouth. They tell their students that the "nose is for breathing, the mouth is for eating."

== See also ==
- Aerophagia
- Breath-holding spell
- Hiccup
