= List of orthodontic functional appliances =

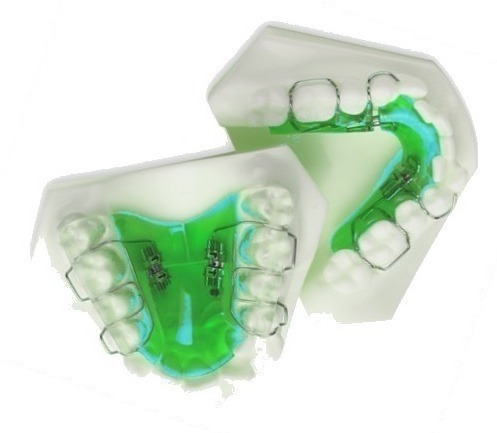
Upper and Lower Jaw Functional Expanders

This is a comprehensive list of functional appliances that are used in the field of orthodontics. The functional appliances can be divided into fixed and removable. The fixed functional appliances have to be bonded to the teeth by an orthodontist. A removable functional appliance does not need to be bonded on the teeth and can be removed by the patient. A removable appliance is usually used by patients who have high degree of compliance with their orthodontic treatment. Fixed appliances are able to produce very accurate movement in the teeth

Both fixed and removable functional appliances can be used to correct a malocclusion in three planes: Anterior-Posterior, Vertical and Transverse.

In the Anterior-Posterior dimension, appliances such as Class II and Class III are used. Appliances used in transverse dimension are utilized to expand either the maxillary or the mandibular arch. Appliances used in the vertical dimension are used to correct open or deep bite.

== History ==
Initially, dento-facial Orthopaedics was mainly done in Europe. The United States was introduced to Fixed Orthodontics by Edward Angle. Norman William Kingsley was the first person to show "jumping the bite" by using an anterior bite plate. Hotz then developed the Vorbissplate which was a modification of Kingsley's plate. Wilhelm Roux is credited with being the first person who studied the effects of functional forces on Orthodontics in 1883. His workings were then used by other dentists studying dental orthopaedics. His teachings became known as Roux Hypothesis, which Karl Haupl later expanded upon. The Monobloc was developed by Pierre Robin (surgeon) in 1902 and is considered to be one of the first functional appliances in Orthodontics. The Monobloc was a modification of Ottolengui's removable plate. In 1908, Viggo Andersen developed the Activator appliance. This was the first functional appliance to be widely accepted, especially in Europe. This appliance became the "Norwegian" system of treatment in Orthodontics in the early 1900s.

In addition, in 1905 the Herbst Appliance was introduced by Emil Herbst. This appliance did not go through much evolution until the 1970s when Hans Pancherz revived interest in it. In the 1950s, Wilhem Balters modified Andersen's Activator appliance and gave the new appliance the name Bionator Appliance, which was designed to produce forward positioning of the mandible. The Positioner Appliance was developed by Harold Kesling in 1944 in order to aid the orthodontic treatment during the finishing stage. The Frankel appliance were developed by Rolf Frankel in 1957 for treatment of Class I, II, III Malocclusions . William Clark also developed Twin Block Appliance in 1978 which resembled Artur Martin Schwarz double plates that he developed in the 1950s.

== Fixed appliances ==
=== Distalization appliances ===
- "New" Distalizer
- Pasin-Pin-System
- Barrel Fixed 3-Way
- Beneslider
- CD Distalizer Nance Appliance with Coil Springs
- Carriere Motion 3D
- Crickett Appliance
- Crozat Appliance
- Distal Jet
- Fast Back Appliance
- First Class Appliance
- Greenfield Molar Distalizer (Piston Appliance)
- Intraoral Body Molar Distalizer (IBMD)
- Jones Jig
- Keles Slider
- Korn Lip Bumper
- K Loop Appliance
- Lokar Appliance
- Mandibular Anterior Repositioning Appliance (MARA)
- Molar Distalization Bow
- Multi-Distalizing Arch
- Pendulum appliance
- P-Rax Molar Distalizer
- Simplified Molar Distalizer (FROG)
- T-Rex
- Veltri's Distalizer
- Vertical Holding Appliance
- Wilson's Bimetric Distalizing Arch

=== Class II appliances ===
- Amoric Torsion Coil
- Herbst Appliance
  - MiniscopeTM Telescoping Herbst
  - Malu Herbst Appliance
- MARA Appliance
- Jasper Jumper
- Eureka Spring
- Carriere Motion 3D Appliance
- Twin Force Bite Corrector
- Churro Jumper
- Klapper Super Spring
- Scandee Tubular Jumper
- Magnetic Telescopic Device
- Bionator Appliance
- Higgins Xbow
- PowerScope 2
- Forsus Appliance
- Ventral Telescope
- IST Appliance
- Biopedic Appliance
- LM-Activator
- BioBiteCorrector
- Fixed Lingual Mandibular Growth Modificator (FLMGM)

=== Class III appliances ===
- Quick Fix
- Modified Tandem Appliances (MTA)
- Class III Tandem Bow
- Carriere® Motion™ Appliance for Class III Correction
- Face Mask

=== Intrusion appliances ===
- Rapid Molar Intruder

=== Mesialization appliances ===
- Mesial Jet
- T Bar Appliance

=== Vertical Dimension appliances ===
- Thurow Appliance
  - Modified Thurow Appliance

== Removable Appliances ==
=== Components ===
Some of the components of removal appliances are retentive in nature. They are usually connecting by an acrylic component known as baseplate. The majority of the appliances include components such as Labial Bow and Adams Clasp, both of these components are passive in nature. Labial bow is a wire attached to the baseplate which goes around the incisor teeth to provide retention of those teeth. Labial bow usually have U-Loops at the end to allow it to activate more. Adams clasps are used for retention of these removable appliances and are usually fabricated in the molar areas. They are usually manufactured from 0.7mm hard stainless steel wire (HSSW), or 0.6mm HSSW when planned for deciduous teeth. Removal of the appliance is usually performed by holding the bridge of this clasp. Other clasps that are usually used are C clasps on canines, Southend Clasp (on anteriors), Ball-ended clasp (primarily for use with the Twin Block system in the lower anteriors) and Plint clasp.

Active components of removable appliances include springs which provides light forces on a tooth to move it orthodontically. Components such as Palatal Finger Springs, Buccal Canine Retractor, Z-Spring, T-Spring, Coffin Spring, Active Labial Bows (Mill's Bow or Roberts retractor), Screws and Elastics are all considered to be active components of the removable functional appliances. If a spring is moving one tooth it is made of 0.5mm thick stainless steel wire. The thickness increases to 0.6 or 0.7mm wire if it is to move more teeth or a larger/multi rooted tooth.

- Palatal Finger Spring - These springs are used to move teeth buccally or lingually.
- Buccal Canine Retractor - These springs are used to bring a buccally placed canine more lingual.
- Z-Spring - This spring is used to move one or two teeth labially
- T-Spring - This spring is used to move teeth labially.
- Coffin Spring - This spring is used for expansion and can be substituted instead of a screw in an expansion device. They apply heavy forces and is activated by flattening the spring.

=== Class II Appliances ===
- Twin-Block Appliance
- Frankel II
- Mono-Bloc Appliance
- Rickonator
- Dynamax Appliance
- R-Appliance
- Anterior Inclined Bite Plate (AIBP)
- Schwarz Double Plate
- Activator appliance
  - Split Activator (Bow activator)
  - Eschler's Modification
  - Harvold - Woodside Activator
  - Herren's Activator (1953)
  - Occlus-o-Guide®, Nite-Guide®, and Ortho-T® preformed activators/positioners
  - H-Activator
  - Klammt Activator
  - LM-Activator
  - LSU Activator
  - V-Activator
  - Schwarz Activator
  - Medium Opening Activator
- Expansion and labial segment alignment appliance (ELSAA)
- PAM - Guias Póstero-Anterior Marinho (Brasil)
- Propulsor de Rossi (Brasil)
- Simões Network - SN (Brasil)

=== Class III Appliances ===
- Eganhouse Class III Appliance
- Frankel III
- PAM - Guias Póstero-Anterior Marinho (Brasil)
- Simões Network - SN (Brasil)

=== Transverse Appliances ===
- Frankel I, II, IV
- PAM - Guias Póstero-Anterior Marinho (Brasil)
- Simões Network - SN (Brasil)

=== Distalization Appliances ===
- Acrylic Cervical Occipital Anchorage Appliance (ACCO)
- Removable Molar distalization splint

== Orthodontic/Deprogramming Splints ==
- Dorsal Splint
- Superior Repositioning Splint
- Farrar Splint
- Maxillary Anterior Deprogrammer
- Maxillary Flat Plane
- Stack Bionator
- Luco Splint
- Gelb Splint/MORA
- Modified Gelb Splint
- Tanner Repositioning Splint
- Pull Forward Splint
- Flat Occlusal Plane Splint
- Mini Deprogrammer
- "B" Splint (Wilkerson Style)
- Cranham Deprogrammer
- Kois Deprogrammer
- Full Contact Splint with Anterior Guidance
  - Pankey Style
  - Brucia/FACE Style
  - Dawson Style
  - Spear Style

== See also ==
- List of palatal expanders
- Molar distalization
- Palatal expansion
- Mandibular expansion or lower jaw expansion
- Functional appliances
