= Artur Martin Schwarz =

Austrian orthodontist

- Born: 27 June 1887; Austria
- Education: University of Vienna Medical School
- Known for: developing Schwarz Double plates
- Medical career
- Profession: Dentist, Medical
- Institutions: Vienna Polyclinic
- Sub-specialties: Orthodontics

Artur Martin Schwarz (1887–1963) was an Austrian orthodontist who is credited for developing Schwarz double plates in 1956. His appliance later served as a basis for the development of the Twin Block Appliance, which promotes growth of the lower jaw, for example to treat overbite.

== Life ==
Schwarz received his medical degree from Medical University of Vienna in 1913. He served as a military surgeon in World War I. After the war, he studied and practiced otorhinolaryngology under Neumann until 1924. In 1928, Schwarz became the leader of the School Dental Service of Vienna Dental Society after he was introduced to the practice by Gottlieb. Schwarz then became Director of Kieferorthopaedia of Vienna Polyclinic in 1939. At the same time, Schwarz worked with Hans Peter Bimler whom he taught until 1941. Under Schwarz, the orthodontic service was expanded to cover 3000 patients at that place and in 1951, he received the Professor Extraordinary award from the Polyclinic.

== Orthodontics ==
Artur Schwarz wrote more than 160 scientific papers on the genesis of anomalies, tissue changes related to tooth movement, and orthodontic diagnosis and treatment. He wrote Lehrgang der Gebiss-Regelung, a two volume periodic literature. (A third edition was published in 1961 by Urban and Schwarzenberg).

His double active plate tried to combine the effect of an activator appliance and dental plates by creating two separate plates for each arch. These double plates resembled activators in two pieces.
