= Hans Peter Bimler =

German orthodontist

- Born: 10 December 1916; Germany
- Died: 28 June 2003 (aged 86)
- Known for: Developed first Roentgenphotogramm in the world, developed Bimler Appliance and Bimler Cephalometric Analysis
- Medical career
- Profession: Dentist
- Sub-specialties: orthodontics otolaryngology

Hans Peter Bimler (10 December 1916 – 28 June 2003) was a German orthodontist who was known for developing the Bimler appliance. He also developed the first Roentgenphotogramm in 1939. Hans also developed the elastic bite former during World War II.

== Life ==
He was born to Walter Bimler who was a dentist in Silesia, Germany. Hans enrolled himself in the medical faculty in Breslau, Germany in 1935. Then in 1939, he went to Vienna, Austria to study under Artur Martin Schwarz. Two years later, due to WWII, Hans returned to Germany to work with his father. He was also part of German military. He was once captured by the British army and later released as a prisoner of the war. After his release, he specialized in otolaryngology and worked in Hamburg for Schuchardt. Hans developed the Roentgenphotogramm in 1939 and presented his findings to European Orthodontic Society in 1939 in Wiesbaden, Germany. This roentgenphotogramm showed a picture where skull, teeth, soft tissue, x-ray and a photograph was superimposed on each other. After WWII, Hans and his family moved to the West. Bimler eventually developed the Bimler Cephalometric Analysis.

As a surgeon during WWII, he treated a patient who lost part of his mandible, and Hans ended up using an appliance which allowed the rest of the mandible to be inserted into the appliance. This eventually lead to the development of the Bimler Appliance.

In 1953, he married his wife Erika. They had a daughter named Barbara Bimler who is also an Orthodontist. He died on 28 June 2003.

== Bimler Appliance ==
Hans worked with the Activator appliance in his father's office. He did not like the rigidity and the bulkiness of this appliance. Therefore, slowly Hans started testing out a new type of appliance where he slowly replaced acrylic with wire made of stainless steel. His appliance came to known as the "Elastic Oral Adaptor" or the "Bimler Appliance".

== See also ==
- Activator appliance
- List of orthodontic functional appliances
