= Frankel appliance =

Orthodontic functional appliance

The Frankel appliance or Frankel functional regulator is an orthodontic functional appliance which was developed by Rolf Fränkel in 1950s for treatment to patients of all ages (more so for adults in orthotropics). This appliance primarily focused on the modulation of neuromuscular activity in order to produce changes in jaw and teeth. The appliance was opposite to the Activator appliance and Bionator appliance.

== History ==
It was developed by Rolf Fränkel in Germany in 1950s. In his practice, Fränkel had used the activator functional appliance and experienced mixed results with this appliance. He believed that a treatment outcome is more stable if the functional deviations of muscles are also corrected along with dentition. Therefore, through his work he developed an approach which allowed the maxillary and mandibular muscles to play an important part in an orthodontic treatment. He achieved that through development of functional regulator appliances. These appliances allowed him to train and reprogram the musculature around the mouth. He published around 70 articles which stressed the importance of his appliance in expanding the dental arches.

He first introduced his functional orthopedic approach in 1966 at a meeting for European Orthodontic Society.

== Philosophy ==
Fränkel's philosophy mirrored that of Melvin Moss. Their philosophy was that the functional performance of the muscular portions of the oral capsule influence the developing functional spaces. Fränkel also thought that the functional spaces are influenced by the atmospheric pressure. He believed that the perioral muscles had restraining effect on the dental arches and that the insertion of appliance expands the capsule and allows new functional adaptation of the muscle.

== Types ==
Frankel Appliance I (FR 1)

This appliance had Type A, B and C. The difference between A and B was the lower lingual loops in one and lower lingual shield in another. This was mainly used for Class 1 and Class 2 Division 1 malocclusion.

- Acrylic Components
  - Buccal Shield - They were about 2.5mm thick and their goal was to expand the soft tissue capsule in the back.
  - Lip Pads - They are tear drop shaped acrylic pads which were placed in the vestibule of the lower arch.
  - Lingual Shield - This allows mandibular muscles to overcome their poor posture.
- Wire components
  - Palatal bow - This rests on maxillary molar and has a stabilizing action for the appliance.
  - Cross over wire - They run between 1st and 2nd premolars and are responsible for movement of the buccal segments.
  - Lower lingual wires - They prevent the lingual movement of lower incisors.
  - Labial bow -
  - Canine loop - Used for guided eruption of canine and also for intermaxillary anchorage.

Frankel Appliance II (FR II)

This was used primarily in Class 2 Division 1 and 2.

Frankel Appliance III (FR III)

Used in patients with Class 3 malocclusion. In this appliance the lip pads are used in the maxillary arch to allow the maxilla to grow. The mandibular arch does not have pads in the anterior to allow the soft tissue forces to act on the mandible.

Frankel Appliance IV (FR IV)

Used in patients with open bite and bimaxillary protrusion cases.

Frankel Appliance V (FR V)

This appliance can be used with headgear in patients with high mandibular plane angle and vertical maxillary excess.

== Modifications ==
- Otton (1992) - Capped Frankel Appliance.
- Owen (1985) - Modified functional regulator for Vertical Maxillary Excess.
- Chate (1986) - Angulation of Cross Wires was changed.
- Kingston - He modified the buccal shields.
- Haynes (1986) - He modified appliance to have continuous buccolabial shield palatal acrylic support.

== See also ==
- Herbst appliance
- Pendulum appliance
