= Orthodontic technology =

Specialty of dental technology

Orthodontic technology is a specialty of dental technology that is concerned with the design and fabrication of dental appliances for the treatment of malocclusions, which may be a result of tooth irregularity, disproportionate jaw relationships, or both.

There are three main types of orthodontic appliances: active, passive and functional. All these types can be fixed or removable.

== Active appliances ==
An active appliance is a device used to apply forces to the teeth to change the relationship of the teeth.

=== Removable active appliances ===
Removable active appliances are intended for simple tipping movements. Use of removable appliances in modern orthodontics is much more limited than in the past due to their various shortcomings.

- Expansion and labial segment alignment appliance (ELSAA)

=== Fixed active appliances ===
Edward Angle, regarded as the father of American orthodontics, developed many universal fixed active appliances, unifying orthodontic practice.

- Begg lightwire appliances
- Pre-adjusted edgewise appliances
- Self-ligating edgewise appliances
- Bi helix
- Tri helix
- Quad helix
- Palatal expander/rapid maxillary expansion appliance (RME)
- Tip-edge appliance

== Functional appliances ==
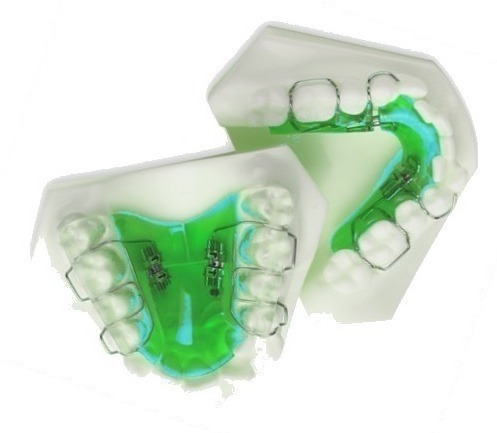
Upper and Lower Jaw Functional Expanders

There is a totally different orthodontics approach without extraction and pain, is called functional orthodontics, the functional orthodontic technology is different and called functional appliance, that is an appliance that produces all or part of its effect by altering the position of the mandible/maxilla. Also known as dentofacial orthopaedic appliances, these appliances utilize the muscle action of the patient and responses of nervous system to produce orthodontic or orthopaedic forces. Various functional appliances have been described. There is a list of orthodontic functional appliances.

Functional appliances are orthodontic appliances that are used to correct a malocclusion by avoiding mouth breathing and utilising, eliminating or guiding muscle function forces, tooth eruption and growth. Although there are many different types (fixed and removable), the majority work by via forward mandibular posturing to promote mandibular growth in growing patients. They are mostly used to reduce the projection of the front teeth (increased overjet) in patients with class II malocclusion. These appliances are not very effective at correcting dental irregularities or improving alignment and so are usually followed by treatment with fixed appliances. Whilst functional appliances have been suggested for treatment of Class III malocclusion, their limited success has been superseded by substantially improved treatment results with protraction headgear.

=== Orthodontic headgear ===
Headgear

Orthodontic headgear is a type of appliance attached to dental braces that aids in correcting more severe bite problems.

Headgear is an orthodontic appliance for the correction of Class II correction, typically used in growing patients to correct overbites by holding back the growth of the upper jaw, allowing the lower jaw to catch up.

The headgear can also be used to make more space for teeth to come in. The headgear is then attached to the molars (via molar headgear bands & tubes), and helps to push or draw them backwards in the mouth, opening up space for the front teeth to be moved back using braces and bands.

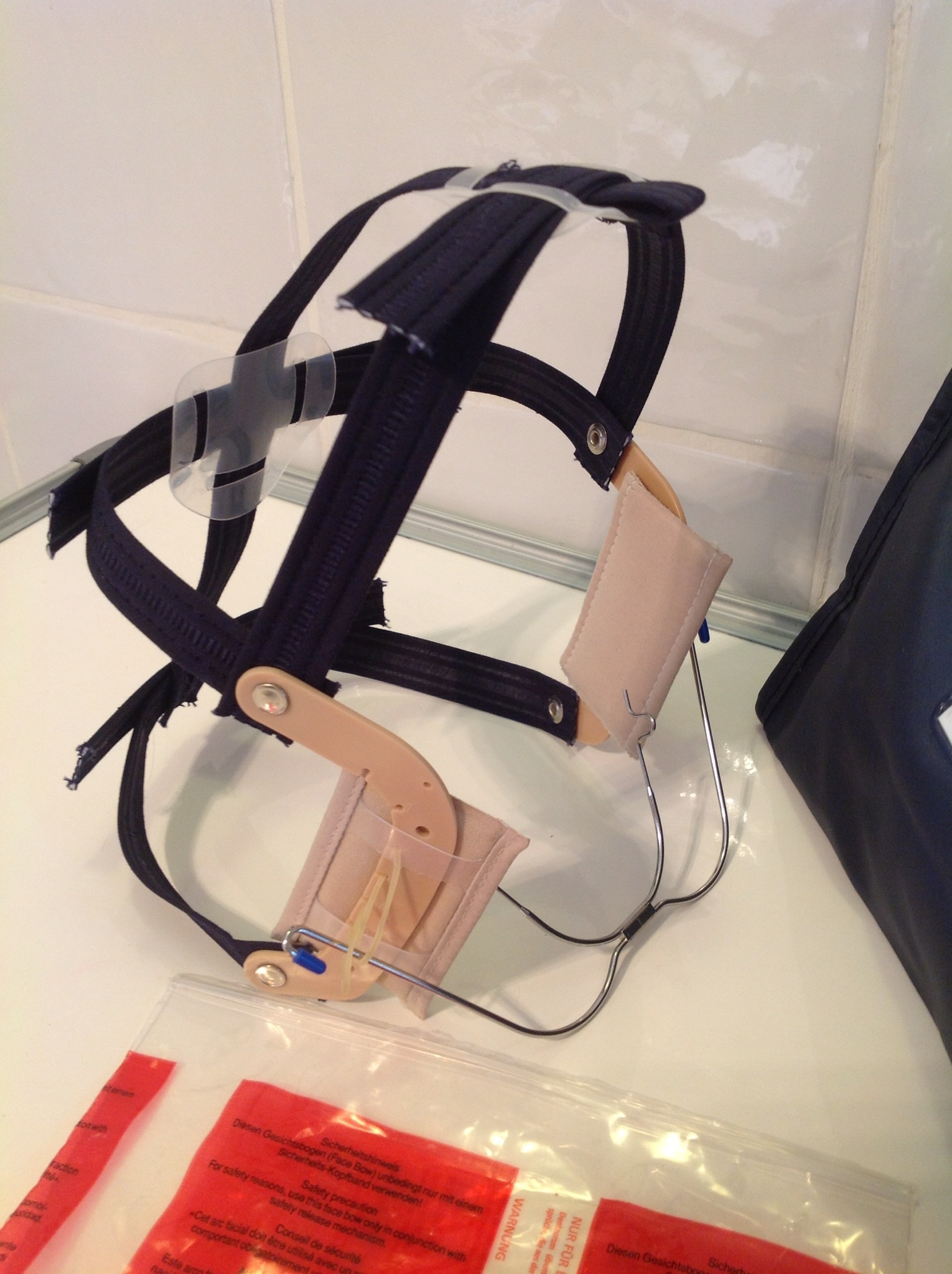
Full orthodontic headgear with headcap, fitting straps, facebow, and elastics

Headgear needs to be worn approximately 12 to 22 hours a day to be truly effective in correcting the overbite, and treatment is usually anywhere from 6 to 18 months in duration, depending on the severity of the overbite and how much a patient is growing.

==== Orthodontic facemask and reverse-pull headgear ====
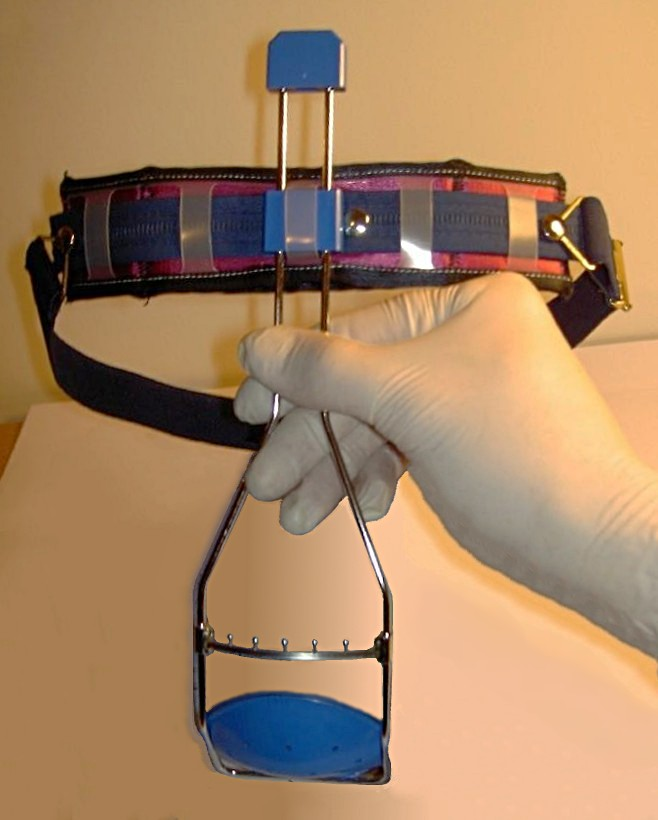
Facemask

Facemask or reverse-pull headgear is used to control the growth of the maxillary and mandibular bones during orthodontic treatment.

The appliance is used in growing patients to correct under bites (known as a Class III orthodontic problem) by pulling forward and assisting the growth of the upper jaw, allowing the upper jaw to catch up.

Facemasks or reverse-pull headgear needs to be worn approximately 12 to 22 hrs to be truly effective in correcting the under bite, usually anywhere from 6 to 18 months depending on the severity of the bite and how much a patient is growing.

The appliance normally consists of a frame or a centre bars that are strapped to the patients head during a fitting appointment. The frame has a section which is positioned in front of the patients mouth, which allows for the attachment of elastic or rubber bands directly into the mouth area. These elastics are then hooked onto the child's braces (brackets and bands) or appliance fitted in his or her mouth.

This creates a forward 'pulling' force to pull the upper jaw forward.

=== Fixed functional appliances ===
- Herbst appliance: A Herbst appliance corrects overbites by realigning the jaw. Typically used in children, this device attaches rings glued to the top and bottom teeth. This metal appliance is often worn at the same time as braces.
- Twin block appliance: The twin block appliance is a removable appliance, and its high comfort level allows you to wear it 24 hours a day. This appliance actually is made up of two separate appliances that work together as one. The upper plate includes an optional expansion screw to widen your upper arch, if needed, as well as pads to cover your molars. The lower plate includes pads to cover your lower bicuspids. These two appliances interlock at an angle, and they move your lower jaw forward and lock it into the ideal position when you bite together. This new position, while temporary, will eventually become the permanent corrected position.
- Fixed Lingual Mandibular Growth Modificator (FLMGM): The FLMGM consists of two separate and fixed parts. The upper one is palatally positioned but buccally clipped to traditional upper molars bands, while the lower is lingually welded to traditional lower molars bands. Maxillary part: It has the following components: Acrylic button, two retention wires: one in each side, two retention hooks and advancement loops. Mandibular part: It is made in a similar manner to a standard lingual arch with 1.0 mm stainless steel hard wire welded to the lingual aspect of fi rst molars bands. From a clinical perspective, the FLMGM offers the following advantages:

1) Permanent effect, independent of patient compliance, as it is fixed. 2) Esthetics, as it is small and lingually located. 3) Eliminates the need for two separate treatment phases, as it is suitable for use in parallel with complete multibracket appliance in both arches. 4) Flexibility in treatment timing, as it can be used anytime during the mixed and permanent dentition. 5) No interference with occlusal development. 6) Wide and comfortable range of mastication movements, as the appliance consists of two separate parts with no permanent and physical intermaxillary connection.

=== Treatment Timing ===
Timing of treatment with functional appliances is crucial as they must be used whilst the patient is still growing in order to achieve maximum benefit. It has been suggested that the best time to prescribe one of these appliances is in alignment with the pubertal grown spurt.

=== Types ===
There are many different types of fixed and removable functional applications. Only a few of the most common are discussed below.

The most popular functional appliance is the Twin-block appliance as it has been found to be the most "patient-friendly". This consists of upper and lower removable appliances that each have bite blocks posturing the mandible into a forward position. However, patient compliance can sometimes be an issue with this appliance as the bulky acrylic blocks can cause issues with eating and speaking and patients can easily remove them. Removable Twin-blocks have been found to be as effective as the fixed Herbst appliance.

The Herbst appliance is a fixed-functional appliance. It consists of sections attached to the upper and lower posterior teeth that are attached by a rigid arm pushing the mandible forwards. The fact that it is a fixed appliance eliminates the patient compliance issues that accompany the Twin-block appliance. O'Brien et al. (2003) found that treatment the Herbst appliance displayed a lower failure-to-complete treatment rate (12.9%) than Twin-block appliances (33.6%). However, the Herbst application still remains the less popular choice than the Twin-blocks due to a higher breakage rate and increased cost of appliance manufacture and clinical time.

A myriad of other functional appliance have been invented including the standard activator, the medium opening activator (MOA), Bionator and Frankel. The MOA is a single piece functional appliance that allows for greater patient comfort with minimal acrylic than any of the other single-piece removable functional appliances but compliance with all of these can be limited due to these paradoxically limiting normal mandibular function during wear. All of these appliances allows selective eruption of the lower posterior teeth which is useful for reducing a deep overbite whilst correcting the Class II malocclusion.

=== Additional benefits ===
Tulloch et al. (1998) found that functional appliances reduce the need for orthognathic surgery. The use of functional appliances to correct Class II malocclusion can also have psychological benefits. O'Brien at el. (2003) found that early treatment using Twin-block appliances increased the patient's self-esteem and resulted in reduced negative social encounters.

== Digital Orthodontic Technology ==
There are 7 parts to an orthodontic assessment: case history, clinical examination, model analysis, functional analysis, cephalometric analysis, radiographic analysis of the teeth, and photographic analysis.

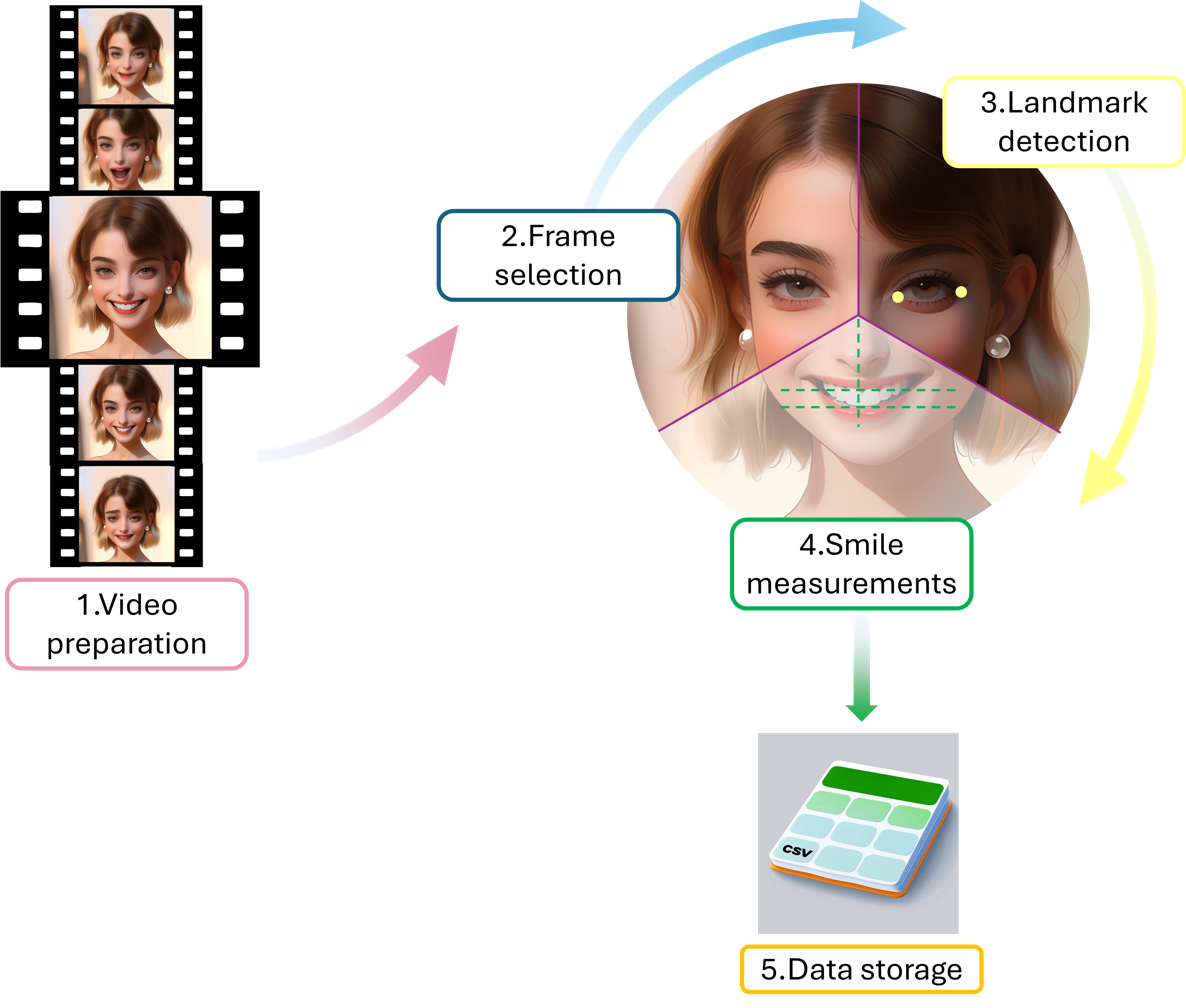
The workflow of Dynasmile software.

To focus specifically on radiographic and photographic analysis, recent advances leverage digital technology such as AI-powered software for automated smile analysis in orthodontics.

=== Radiography ===
Radiography has been used in dental offices for decades, but as digital technology expands there are various benefits to using digital radiography compared to conventional film. Digital radiography: decreases environmental burdens, improves accuracy in image processing, decreases time and increases efficiency, reduces radiation, and improves diagnosis and treatment planning for professionals.

3D radiography is also becoming more prevalent in dental offices as well and provides numerous benefits for assessing and locating positions of various diagnosis such as TMJ problems, impacted teeth, and tooth eruptions.

=== Digital Scanners ===
One of the most noticeable changes in digital dental technology is the adaptation of digital scanners in dental and specialty offices. A big change for patients specifically, is the transition from plaster model impressions to digital scanners. It provides more accurate impressions and is noticeably more comfortable for patients. Digital scanners are also used as way for dental offices to manufacture aligners and retainers directly from their office. This allows for improved collaboration between offices through the ability to transfer scans electronically and it allows a direct removal of defects in the scan before being printed.

== See also ==
- List of orthodontic functional appliances
