= Rolf Fränkel =

German Orthodontist

Rolf Fränkel (29 March 1908 – 9 September 2001) was a German Orthodontist who is known for developing the Frankel appliance.

== Life ==
Fränkel was born in Leipzig in 1908. He received his dental degree in Leipzig in 1930. He started working on Orthodontic patients in 1928. After that, he was part of an OMFS department in a Hospital in Essen after which he worked in a private practice in Zwickau until 1942. Fränkel was drafted in World War II and after the war he returned to his private practice in Zwickau. The town then became part of East Germany which isolated Fränkel from the world in the West. In 1961, Fränkel became the head of HeinrichBraun Regional Hospital in Zwickau. He stayed on that position until his retirement in 1978. Fränkel's initial work was in German and therefore he wasn't recognized much in the Orthodontic world. One notable exception to this is Dr John Mew, who shared Fränkel's interest in the aetiology of malocclusion. Mew visited Fränkel in 1968 and had Fränkel to stay in the UK in 1971. After Fränkel learned English, T.M. Graber invited him to speak at a Lecture in University of Michigan School of Dentistry, through which his popularity in the English-speaking Orthodontic community increased.

He died in Zwickau, Germany, at the age of 93 years. He is survived by his wife, Else. Fränkel and his wife had two children, Christine Fränkel and Sibylle Fränkel.

== Functional activator appliance ==
In his practice, Fränkel had used the activator functional appliance and experienced mixed results with this appliance. He believed that a treatment outcome is more stable if the functional deviations of muscles are also corrected along with dentition. Therefore, through his work he developed an approach which allowed the maxillary and mandibular muscles to play an important part in an orthodontic treatment. He achieved that through development of functional regulator appliances. These appliances allowed him to train and reprogram the musculature around the mouth. He published around 70 articles which stressed the importance of his appliance in expanding the dental arches.

He first introduced his functional orthopedic approach in 1966 at a meeting for European Orthodontic Society. Fraenkel appliances were never used in practice among orthodontists, except in Eastern Germany in the seventies and eighties of the last century. Although Fränkel became very popular in orthodontic science. The rising of popularity is the outcome of his successful public relations work at meetings and in leading orthodontic journals.

== Awards ==
- University of Erfurt, Professor of Medicine, 1973
- Humboldt University of Berlin, Honorary Doctorate, 1990
- Royal College of Surgeons of England Fellow, 1992
- Albert H. Ketcham Award, 1995

== Also ==
- Frankel appliance
