= Herbst appliance =

Orthodontic appliance

The Herbst appliance is an orthodontic appliance used by orthodontists to correct class 2 retrognathic mandible in a growing patient, meaning that the lower jaw is too far back. This is also called bitejumping. Herbst appliance parts include stainless steel surgical frameworks that are secured onto the teeth by bands (steel rings that go around teeth) or acrylic bites. These are connected by sets of telescoping mechanisms that apply gentle upward and backward force on the upper jaw, and forward force on the lower jaw. The original bite-jumping appliance (Herbst appliance) was designed by Dr. Emil Herbst and reintroduced by Dr. Hans Pancherz using maxillary and mandibular first molars and first bicuspids. The bands were connected with heavy wire soldered to each band and carried a tube and piston assembly that allowed mandibular movement but permanently postured the mandible forward. The appliance not only corrected a dental Class II to a dental Class I but also offered a marked improvement of the classic Class II facial profile.

== History ==
It was developed by Emil Herbst in the early 1900s and was reintroduced in 1979 by Hans Pancherz, it is largely established in today's orthodontics for Class II therapy. Many designs of this appliance have since been developed such as Sabbagh Spring, Powerscope, and Cantilever Bite Jumper (CBJ)

== Mechanism of Action ==
The Herbst appliance serves as an effective solution for correcting a class II malocclusion, where the lower jaw is positioned too far back in relation to the upper jaw. To address this misalignment, the Herbst appliance is typically affixed to the last molar on the upper teeth and the first premolar on the lower teeth. Attachment methods may include bands, acrylic bites, or stainless steel crowns. Central to its function is a telescoping rod that permits the patient to open their mouth, while maintaining a fixed distance when closed. This fixed retraction pushes the lower jaw forward and repositions the upper arch, thereby rectifying the bite issue. The appliance's gradual adjustment mechanism also facilitates tooth movement, with the rod exerting pressure to push the upper teeth backward and the lower teeth forward. Orthodontists may incorporate bushings to extend the fixed length of the rod, aiding in the progressive correction of the malocclusion.

== Modifications ==
There are 4 major modifications in the design of Herbst appliances known as Herbst 1, Herbst 2, Herbst 3 and Herbst 4. There are several variants of the Herbst appliance, including cast Herbst appliance and acrylic splint Herbst appliance. Some of the other variations include;

- Utilization of a Herbst appliance with a ball joint for cases requiring larger lateral movements, facilitating enhanced jaw mobility.
- Seamless integration of the Herbst appliance with a palatal expander to widen the upper arch and optimize orthodontic outcomes.
- Implementation of a lower archwire to exert pressure on all lower teeth, rather than just one, to improve grip and treatment efficacy.

== Indications ==
The Herbst appliance is indicated for the noncompliant treatment of Class II skeletal malocclusions with retrognathic mandible b) and in high angle patients due to the increase in sagittal condylar growth, c)in patients with deep anterior overbite d)in cases of mandibular midline deviation e) n mouth breathers due to the lack of interference while breathing.

The removable Acrylic Herbst Appliance can also be used in patients suffering from obstructive sleep apnea, in order to improve the clinical symptoms. Herbst treatment is also good in postadolescent patients who have passed their peak pubertal growth, as the appliance can take advantage of the residual growth.

== Treatment timing ==
The appropriate skeletal maturation period to initiate Herbst treatment is considered as a critical parameter for successful results. Herbst treatment before the pubertal peak of growth has led to a normal skeletal and soft tissue morphology at a young age. However, this early approach needs retention of the treatment results until the eruption of all the permanent teeth into a stable relationship. By starting treatment in the permanent dentition at or just after the pubertal growth peak, the larger increase in the condylar growth and the shorter retention phase required have led to a more stable occlusion and reduced posttreatment relapse. However, some researchers have found that Herbst treatment was giving equal results in prepubertal and postpubertal patients although greater anchorage loss is to be anticipated in postpubertal patients.

== Advantages ==
- Continuous 24-hour functionality of the Herbst appliance leads to shorter treatment durations, typically lasting 6 to 8 months, compared to 2 to 4 years with removable alternatives.
- Elimination of the need for patient compliance due to the fixed nature of the appliance, reducing the risk of treatment interruptions and enhancing overall effectiveness.
- Promotion of proper jaw alignment by the Herbst appliance can help prevent the need for tooth extractions and improve the patient's facial profile as the jaw moves forward.
- Customizable design allows for modifications tailored to individual patient needs, contributing to enhanced patient tolerance and treatment outcomes.

== Disadvantages ==
- Potential for undesired spacing in the upper arch as teeth are repositioned during treatment with the Herbst appliance.
- Initial discomfort or difficulty chewing may be experienced by patients during the first few weeks of wearing the appliance, though this typically resolves as they acclimate to its presence.

== Treatment Time ==
The duration of treatment with a Herbst appliance can vary depending on the severity of the case, but typically ranges from 6 to 8 months. In instances of more pronounced underbites, treatment may extend to as long as a year.
