= Twin block appliance =

Type of removable orthodontic device

A twin block appliance is a type of removable orthodontic device used to correct Class II malocclusion, where the lower jaw is positioned too far back compared to the upper jaw.

== Introduction ==
=== Malocclusion ===
Malocclusion often involves misalignments between the upper and lower jaws, leading to poor tooth-to-tooth contact and improper biting function. This can hinder the natural growth and development of the jaw.

In Angle's classification system for malocclusion, a Class II bite (Figure 1) occurs when the lower jaw (mandible) is positioned more behind relative to the upper jaw (maxilla). This misalignment means that when the teeth come together, the lower teeth bite significantly behind the upper teeth creating a large horizontal gap between upper and lower teeth. It is defined as increased overjet, which is measured from the labial surface of the tips of the upper incisors to the labial surface of the lower incisors horizontally.

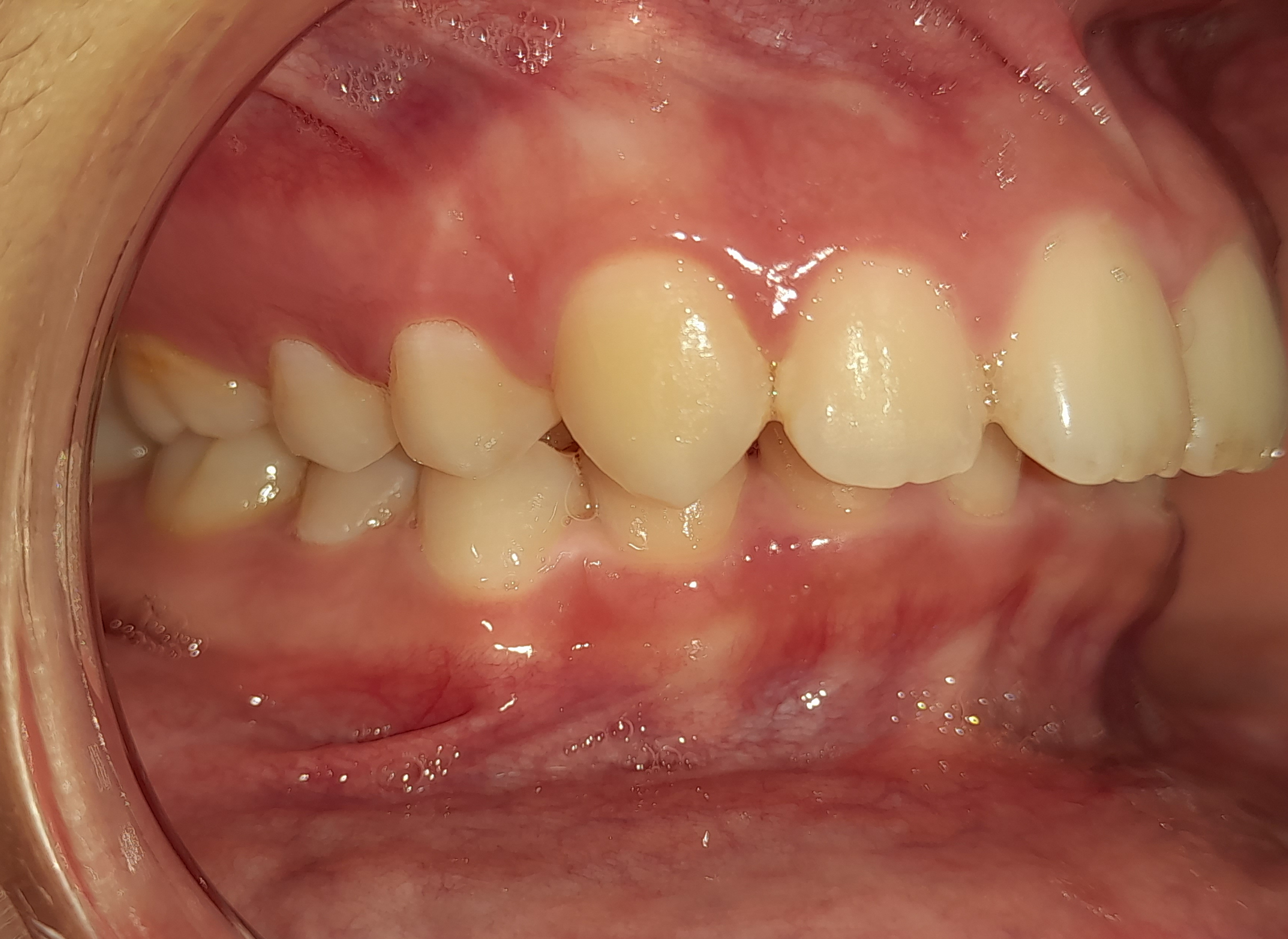
Figure 1: Image depicting Angle's Class II division 1 malocclusion

== Twin Block Appliance ==
Functional appliance therapy is a treatment approach designed to correct these issues. By addressing factors that impede jaw growth and enhancing the muscle function surrounding the teeth. Functional appliances aim to improve the functional relationship of the tooth and facial structures by eliminating unfavourable developmental factors and improving the muscle environment.

By making changes to the position of the teeth and supporting tissues, functional appliance therapy can establish a new, healthier biting pattern that promotes optimal jaw growth and development.

Twin block appliances are simple, full-time bite blocks designed to treat skeletal Class II malocclusion by encouraging the lower jaw to move forward. The goal of this treatment approach is to maximise the growth response of the lower jaw while ensuring patient comfort and aesthetic appeal.

These appliances such as seen in Figure 3 work by enhancing forward growth of the mandible, which helps to correct the misalignment between the upper and lower jaws. This functional approach to treatment is designed to be efficient and effective in addressing Class II malocclusion. Reverse Twin Block appliance can be used in addressing Class 3 malocclusion.

== History ==
Twin block appliance was introduced by Dr William Clark. It is composed of interlocking upper and lower bite blocks which position the mandible forward for overjet correction. Overjet is measured from the labial surface of the tips of the upper incisors to the labial surface of the lower incisors horizontally.

The Twin Block appliance was developed due to an incident involving a young patient, the son of a dental colleague, who had completely knocked out the upper central incisor because of a fall such as seen in Figure 5. Luckily, the tooth was preserved as he was treated within a few hours after the incident. Reimplantation of the tooth was done and a temporary splint was constructed to hold the tooth.

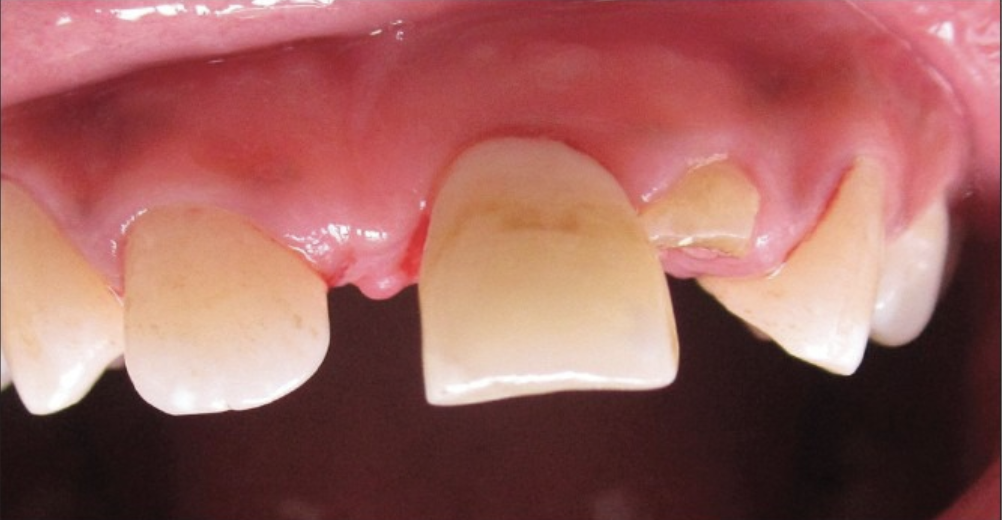
Figure 2: Image depicting traumatized upper central incisor and fractured lateral incisor

The occlusal relationship was classified as Class II division 1, with a 9mm overjet, and the lower lip was positioned behind the upper incisors. This unfavourable lip positioning lead to mobility and root damage of the reimplanted incisor. To prevent the lip from getting trapped in the overjet as seen in Figure 6, it was essential to create an appliance that could be worn full-time to hold the mandible in a forward position. Since no such appliance existed at the time, simple bite blocks were developed to fulfil this purpose.

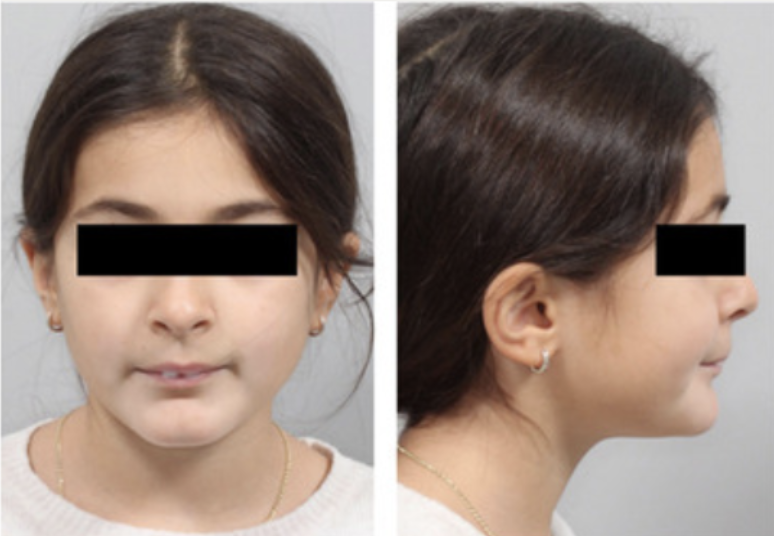
Image taken from Figure 3: Lip trap: The lower lip either rests against or partially tucks behind the upper front teeth

The appliance is designed to utilise occlusal forces to correct the distal occlusion and reduce the overjet without exerting direct pressure on the upper incisors. The upper and lower bite blocks made contact mesial to the first permanent molars at a 90° angle to the occlusal plane when the mandible is positioned forward. This alignment brought the incisors edge-to-edge with a 2mm vertical gap to keep them out of occlusion (interlocking). The patient was required to actively move the mandible forward to occlude the bite blocks in a protrusive bite.

The first Twin Block appliances were fitted on September 7, 1977, when the patient was 8 years and 4 months old. The bite blocks were comfortable to wear, and treatment progressed smoothly, with the distal occlusion improving and the overjet decreasing from 9mm to 4mm within 9 months.

=== Evolution in Angulation of the Inclined Planes ===
The earliest Twin Block appliances were designed with bite blocks that angulated at 90° to the occlusal plane, requiring the patient to consciously occlude in a forward position. However, some patients struggled to maintain this forward posture and would often return to move the mandible back to its original distal occlusal position, causing the bite blocks to stack on top of each other due to their flat occlusal surfaces. This issue became apparent early in treatment when it was observed that the patient was not consistently adopting a forward posture. Biting on the blocks in this manner resulted in a significant posterior open bite such as seen in Figure 9, a complication that occurred in about 30% of the initial Twin Block cases. To address this, the angulation of the bite blocks was modified to 45° to the occlusal plane, effectively guiding the mandible forward. This adjustment immediately resolved the issue.

As the technique developed, the angle of the inclined plane was adjusted from 90° to 45° to the occlusal plane, eventually settling at 70° to the occlusal plane. For patients who struggle to maintain a forward mandibular posture, a 45° angle can still be utilised.

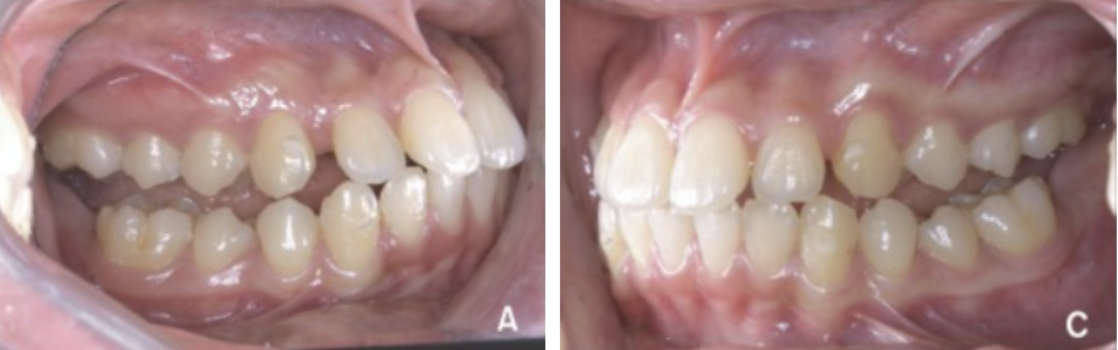
Figure 4: Posterior open bite

An angle of 45° to the occlusal plane provides an equal downward and forward force to the lower dentition. The occlusal force on the inclined planes promotes a corresponding downward and forward growth stimulus. After utilising a 45° angle on the blocks for 8 years, the angulation was ultimately adjusted to a steeper 70° to introduce a more horizontal force component. It was believed that this change might encourage greater forward growth of the mandible. However, if the patient experiences difficulty in maintaining a forward posture, it is advisable to decrease the angulation of the inclined planes back to 45° to help guide the mandible forward and facilitate easier maintenance of the forward position.

== Design of twin block ==
The design of dental appliances must prioritise comfort and aesthetics to encourage patient cooperation and compliance throughout treatment. "Patient-friendly" designs can motivate patients to actively participate in their care and follow their treatment plan.

Twin block appliances offer versatility in design, making them suitable for treating a wide range of malocclusion cases in growing patients. The separate upper and lower arch components allow for individualised adjustments using screws, springs, or bows to address specific dental issues like crowding or irregularity.

== Standard twin block ==
Standard Twin Block appliances are a widely used method in orthodontics for treating Class II division 1 malocclusions. These appliances are particularly effective when the dental arches are well-formed and there is enough overjet (horizontal distance between upper incisors and lower incisors) to allow the lower jaw to move forward freely. The goal of the treatment is to correct the bite by bringing the jaws into a Class I relationship, which ensures proper alignment of the back teeth.

=== Components ===
- The Delta Clasp

The Delta clasp was developed to improve retention in Twin Block appliances. It is based on the Adams clasp shown in Figure 10 A) but includes features that increase durability and reduce the likelihood of breakage. The Delta clasp in Figure 10 B) has closed loops, which can be triangular, circular, or oval in shape. These closed loops maintain their form better than the open U-shaped loops of the Adams clasp, resulting in fewer adjustments and a reduced risk of breakage.

This clasp design is particularly effective in securing the Twin Block appliance on lower premolars and other posterior teeth. Its improved durability allows it to retain its shape through repeated insertion and removal, contributing to a stable and long-lasting fit. In a study by Clark & Stirrups (1979–1993), the failure rates of the delta clasp and the Adams clasp were compared through statistical analysis of two patient groups (69 and 72 patients, respectively) treated with Twin Block appliances. The findings revealed that the delta clasp demonstrated a significantly lower breakage rate (1%) compared to the modified arrowhead (Adams) clasp, which had a breakage rate of 10%. The delta clasp's design can be modified based on the best area of retention, either by following the curvature of the tooth into mesial and distal undercuts, making it suitable for teeth with favourable shapes and well-defined undercuts.

Clasp Construction Methods

The Delta clasp can be constructed in different ways, depending on the shape of the patient's teeth. If the teeth have adequate undercuts (spaces that the clasp can grip), the clasp loop is angled to follow the contour of the tooth and fit into the mesial (front) and distal (back) undercuts. If the teeth do not have sufficient undercuts, the clasp is constructed with the loop directed between the teeth (interdentally) to gain retention from adjacent teeth.

In permanent dentition, Delta clasps are commonly placed on the upper first molars and lower first premolars. They can also be used on deciduous (baby) molars. Additional clasps, such as ball-ended, or C-shaped clasps, may be added for extra retention and to prevent unwanted tooth movements, such as tipping.

- Ball-ended clasp

The ball-end clasp in Figure 11 is a type of wire component used in removable orthodontic appliances, including the Twin Block appliance, to help keep the device securely in place. It consists of a thin metal wire that ends in a small, rounded ball, which rests against a tooth to provide gentle but firm retention. In the Twin Block appliance, the ball-end clasp is usually placed between the lower canines and premolars, where it grips onto the undercuts of the teeth without causing discomfort. Its smooth, rounded shape prevents irritation to the soft tissues while ensuring the appliance stays in position during wear. This clasp is particularly useful because it allows for easy insertion and removal of the appliance while still offering reliable retention, making it an effective choice for maintaining stability throughout treatment.

- Base Plate

The base plate of the Twin Block appliance can be made from either heat-cured or cold-cured acrylic. Heat-cured acrylic offers better strength and precision, which is essential for maintaining the appliance's effectiveness during treatment. By modelling the appliance in wax first, the bite blocks can be shaped with greater accuracy.

Cold-cured acrylic is quicker and more convenient to use but tends to be less durable. This can become an issue in the later stages of treatment, especially when the bite blocks are trimmed to allow for tooth eruption. The inclined planes (sloped surfaces) of the bite blocks may wear down if a softer, cold-cured acrylic is used.

To overcome the limitations of cold-cured acrylic, some orthodontists opt for preformed bite blocks made from high-quality heat-cured acrylic. These preformed blocks ensure a consistent angle for the bite planes and offer greater durability, making the appliance more effective over the long term.

- Lower incisor capping

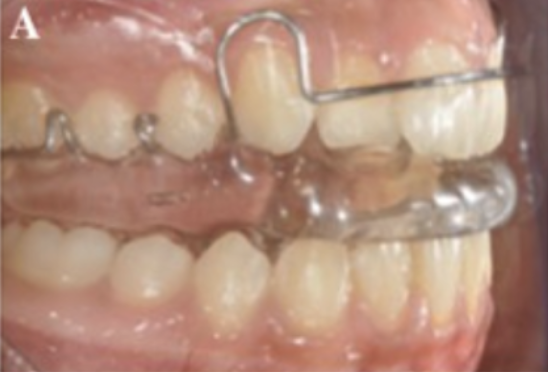
Figure 5: Image depicting a with acrylic capping of lower incisors

Lower incisor capping in a Twin Block appliance is a modification introduced to help control the forward tipping (proclination) of the lower incisors during functional therapy. Initially, it was believed that adding acrylic capping as seen in Figure 12, over the lower incisors could prevent this movement. However, studies have shown that even without capping, a slight 5-degree proclination may occur during the active treatment phase, but the incisors tend to return to an upright position during the support phase. Additionally, research indicates that acrylic capping does not provide a significant restraining effect on incisor inclination. Instead, proclination is primarily influenced by the lingual pressure of the appliance components as the mandible naturally rebounds to its resting position. Another drawback of incisor capping is the potential for decalcification at the tips of the lower incisors, raising concerns about enamel health. Given these findings, the effectiveness of lower incisor capping in preventing proclination remains questionable, and its clinical benefits should be carefully weighed against potential risks.

- Labial Bow

Earlier designs of the Twin Block often incorporated a labial bow, a wire running across the front teeth to assist in positioning as depicted in Figure 13. However, it was discovered that if the labial bow engaged with the upper front teeth too early in the treatment, it could overcorrect the position of the teeth, pulling them too far back. This would hinder the forward movement of the lower jaw, which is a key aspect of the treatment.

To prevent this, the labial bow is usually adjusted to avoid contact with the front teeth or omitted entirely, unless there is a need to upright severely angled upper teeth. Even in such cases, the labial bow should not be activated until the lower jaw has moved into the correct position, and the molars are aligned in a Class I relationship. Premature activation of the labial bow can limit the functional correction by preventing full mandibular advancement.

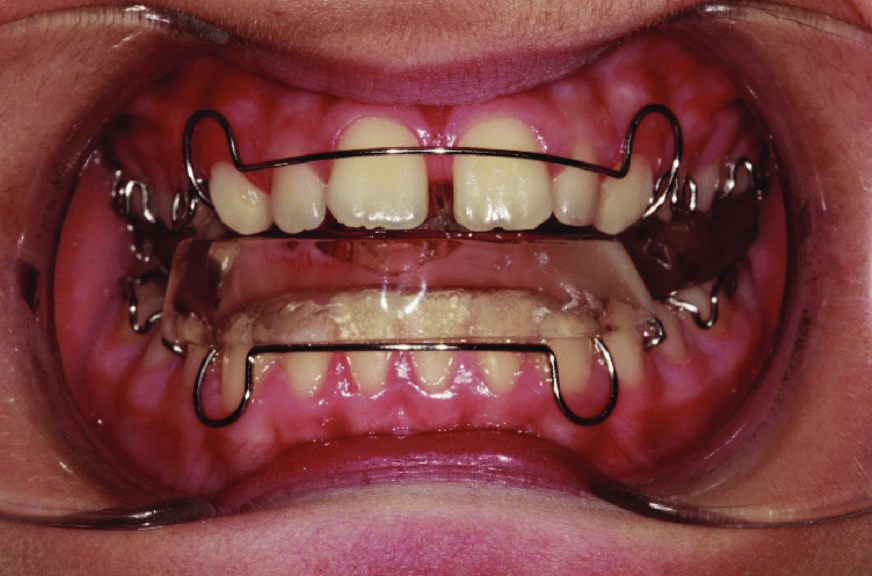
Figure 6: Image depicting a frontal view of labial bow

A good lip seal naturally forms while the patient is wearing the appliance during normal activities like eating and drinking. This lip pressure is often enough to upright the upper teeth, making a labial bow unnecessary in many cases. The absence of a labial bow can also improve the aesthetic appearance of the appliance without sacrificing its effectiveness.

Some variations in Twin Block designs include an acrylic pad placed in front of the lower front teeth to provide additional retention and control. This design modification enhances the appliance's stability during treatment.

Construction of Twin Blocks

The construction of a Twin Block appliance is highly personalised based on the specific needs of the patient. The orthodontist must provide detailed instructions to the laboratory, including any springs or screws needed for individual tooth movements or arch adjustments. These details help in achieving accurate transverse (side-to-side) or sagittal (front-to-back) corrections.

A simple request for "Twin Blocks" does not provide enough information for the lab to construct an effective appliance. The lab requires high-quality dental impressions and a precise record of the patient's bite, which is usually taken with modelling wax or bite registration paste that maintains its shape after being removed from the mouth. Excess material must be trimmed to ensure the models fit properly into the bite registration.

Once the models are sent to the lab, they are mounted on an articulator, which replicates the movement of the patient's jaw. This allows the technician to construct the bite blocks in the correct position. Some labs use plasterless articulators with adjustable screws to ensure precise positioning of the models and bite blocks.

== Modifications ==
The twin block appliance, which was invented by Clark, is one of the popular dental appliances to fix class II malocclusions. The parts of a standard twin block appliance consists of:

- the maxillary and mandibular base plates with 70° inclination of occlusal bite planes.
- a ball-end clasp on the lower incisors
- Delta clasps on the upper and lower posterior teeth
- midline expansion screw

Nevertheless, the usual twin block was unable to meet each patient's unique needs. Over time, a number of modifications have been implemented to address this issue.

- Class II Div II twin block modification (as shown in Figure 14 and 15)

The components are the similar to the standard twin block with some changes:

- Adam's retentive clasps on the upper posterior teeth
- An anterior screw with torquing spurs on the upper incisors
- Double cantilever spring positioned at the front surface of the central incisors
- Concorde facebow twin block (shown in Figure 16)

It is used when the misalignment of the jaws is serious and in the treatment of maxillary and mandibular retraction and imbalance in vertical growth of the jaws. Even in situations where malocclusions are severe, this treatment can quickly correct malocclusions. There is an addition of a hook that curves back towards the front surface of the teeth. It is worn with extraoral straps.

- Twin block for stepwise overjet reduction

It is used for the gradual reduction of overjet. The maxillary appliance block includes advancement screws which are engaged by placing acetyl resin spacers shaped in cylinders of different thicknesses as seen in Figure 17. With the usual 12mm advancement screws, bite activations of up to 7mm are easily accomplished.

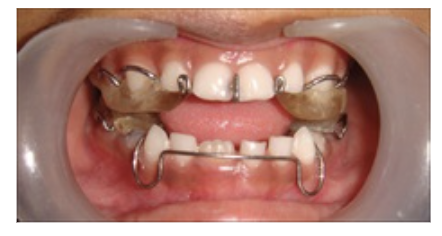
Figure 7: Image depicting reversed twin block

- Reverse Twin Block appliances

The Reverse Twin block appliance in Figure 18 is used for the treatment of Class III malocclusion, where the lower jaw protrudes too far forward. The design of these appliances is reversed compared to standard Twin Blocks, allowing for the application of appropriate forces to correct the misalignment by restricting further growth of the lower jaw.

== Stages of treatment ==
According to Clark the clinical management of class II malocclusion using Twin block Appliance (TBA) is done through two stages.

Stage 1 - Active Phase

- In the first stage -the active phase, in cases of severe skeletal discrepancy, a device called a concordance face bow is used in combination with the TBA in order to fix the skeletal misalignment. The face bow works by exerting a horizontal traction force extraorally and on the maxilla to speed up the process of correcting the alignment.
- The patient has to wear the appliance for 3 days and only remove it when eating in order to adjust to the resolve initial discomfort. Many reported feeling pain during this initial step especially when moving the lower jaw inwards (retracting) due to alteration of the jaw muscles.
- According to Nayak et al., this initial stage would take a minimum of 7 to 9 months of full time wearing. After the initial three day period, patients are expected to comply in wearing the appliance continuously even during meal times.
- A reduction of about 2mm in overjet may be expected at 6-week intervals over the first six months of TBA, depending on how severe the initial issue was.
- Additionally, a midline expansion screw like the one seen in Figure 8 is typically included in the upper appliance, allowing for some maxillary jaw expansion. Depending on how many turns are recommended, this permits expansion of the upper jaw at a rate of 0.2 to 0.5mm every week. This creates space and widens the upper jaw allowing the lower jaw to move ahead easily.
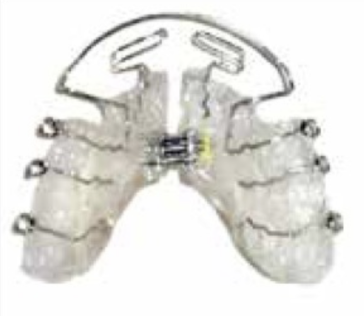
  Figure 8: Image shows the upper component of the Modified TBA with the midline expansion screw.
- Every 7 to 10 days, the midline screw must be turned by one-quarter until the width of the upper jaw can properly fit the lower jaw correctly, which moves ahead.
- The dentist will necessitate the trimming of the inner portion of the lower TBA specifically the area behind the lower front teeth in order to alleviate any pain on the tissue.
- During the expansion phase, the acrylic behind the upper front teeth may also be trimmed to provide a limited amount of spontaneous alignment or uprighting of the front teeth due to lower lip pressure on the front surface of the teeth.
- It is recommended to trim the upper block posteriorly by 1mm to allow the lower first molars to erupt following overjet correction and reducing the deep bite (vertical overlap of lower front teeth by upper front teeth).This is because a lower first molar that erupts differently than the lower second premolar could potentially reduce the amount of space available for the second premolar, making it more likely that it would be displaced and subject to localised crowding.

Stage 2 - Support phase

- The objective of this stage is to maintain the corrected incisor positioning of both upper and lower jaw during active phase.This phase will take up to 4 to 6 months with the additional 3 to 6 months of use in order to fully allow the teeth and jaw bones to reorient. During this phase, an upper Hawley-type removable appliance with an inclined guide plane is used to bring the teeth occlusion into the desired position.

The final treatment would be through the introduction of a fixed orthodontic appliance. This is required to help settle and retain the teeth and skeletal changes.

== Response to twin block treatment ==
The twin block appliance enhances the sagittal intermaxillary relationship of the maxilla and mandible (upper and lower jaw) in a sagittal plane and helps reduce overjet (the protrusion of the upper teeth).

The muscles of the mandible (masseter and temporalis) show increased tightening of the masseter and the rise in the number of contractions of the anterior temporalis. This shows that the twin block appliance contributes to the stretch of the mandibular muscles that leads to the increase in the number of contractions.

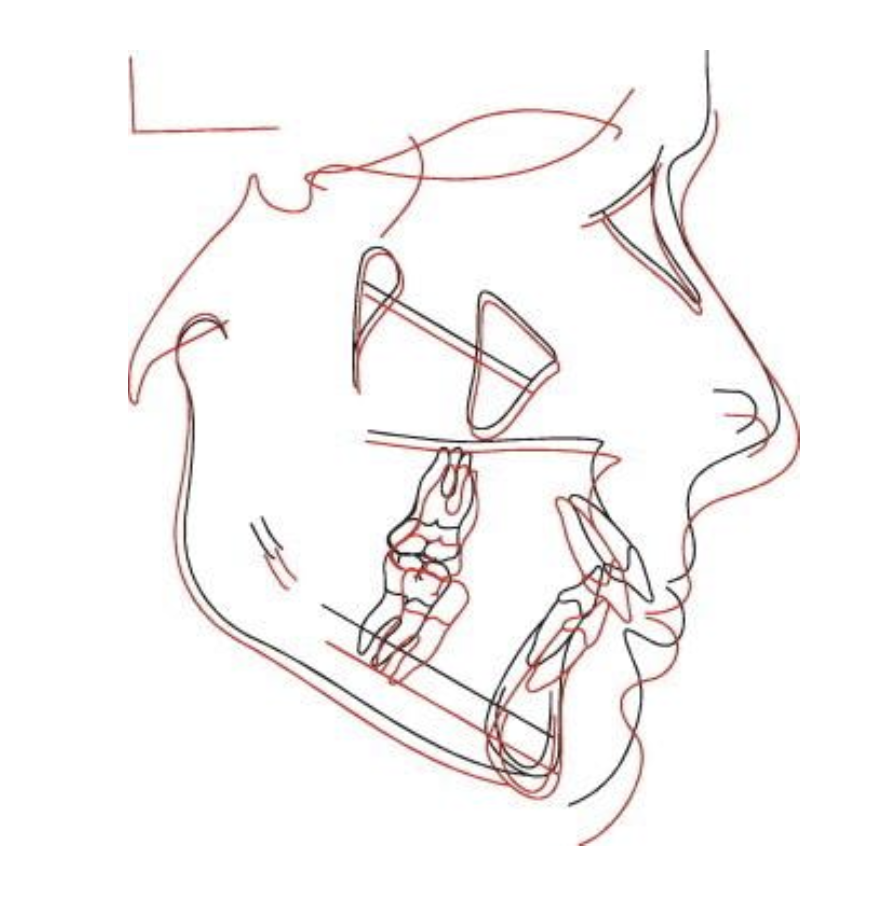
Figure 9: Cephalometric changes: pre-treatment (black lines), pre-debond (red lines)

With the help of CBCT which produces detailed 3D images, the skeletal effects of the condyle (the curved part of the mandible which fits into the TMJ) was recorded.

The size of the condyle, distance between the two condyles, and the length of the mandible increased. The twin block appliance enabled the growth of the condyle in a backwards and upwards direction. Based on cephalometric analysis, as given in Figure 21, the angle of SNB (the position of the mandible to the base of the skull) increased, and the angle of SNA (the position of the maxilla to the base of the skull) and ANB (anteroposterior relationship between the maxilla and mandible) decreased thus reducing the Class II skeletal malocclusion.

The twin block appliance is used with the goal of treating class II malocclusion and enhancing one's facial structure by promoting the growth of the mandible. The appliance should be worn for full time wear for the treatment to be a success.

== Skeletal changes ==
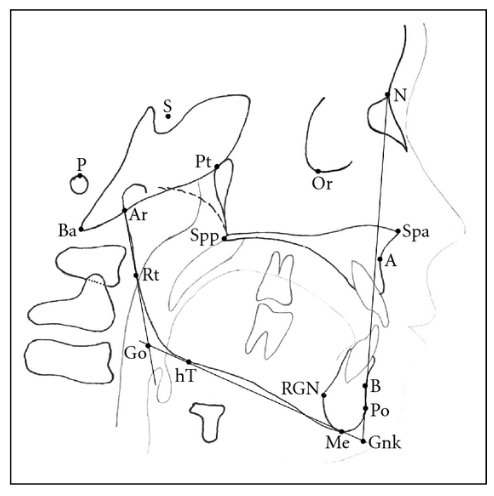
Figure 10: Cephalometric landmarks of the facial skeleton and skull base.

Twin Block treatment was found to contribute to Class II correction, with 49.88% of skeletal changes. The cephalometric landmarks of the facial skeleton and skull base have been shown in Figure 22. Males exhibit greater skeletal changes compared to females.

Effects on the maxilla

- SNA angle exhibits minimal reduction after functional treatment.
- Indicate that the forward growth of maxilla is restricted and a headgear effect is produced.

Effects on the mandible

- There is an increase in the mandibular length.
- There is a reduction in the articular angle (S-Ar-Go), indicating mandibular forward repositioning, leading to opening of the bite to improve the deep bite.

Maxillo-mandibular changes

- Increased length of mandible and restricted maxillary growth in sagittal plane lead to an increase in SNB angle.
- This increased SNB angle results in improvement of ANB angle.
- Reduction in ANB angle indicates that the anteroposterior relationship between maxilla and mandible is improved.
- There is also a reduction in the distance from nasion perpendicular to the pogonion point (N perpendicular to point Pg).
- This depicts that the change in mandible position can lead to the change in maxillomandibular relationship.

== Dental changes ==
Mandibular Length Increase and Growth Control:

- Baccetti et al. demonstrated that the Twin Block appliance leads to significant increases in mandibular length, primarily through stimulation of condylar growth and remodelling of the mandible. The increase in mandibular length results in an improved jaw relationship and aids in correcting the Class II misalignment.

Overjet and Overbite Reduction:

- Several clinical trials, including those conducted by O'Brien et al. and Jena et al., have shown that the Twin Block appliance results in significant reductions in overjet and overbite. These dental improvements are primarily due to a combination of skeletal and dental changes, including the forward positioning of the mandible and retraction of the upper incisors. Overjet reductions of up to 73% were observed, which contributes to a more functional and aesthetic occlusion.

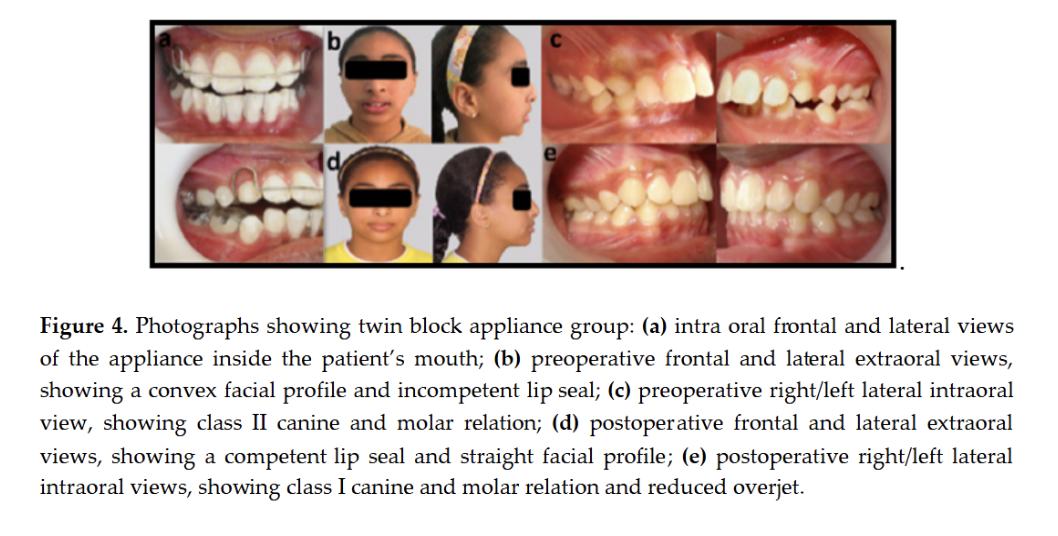
Figure 11: Twin Block appliance groups

Incisor Tipping:

- The research by Ehsani et al. and Mills and McCulloch indicated that proclination of the lower incisors and retroclination of the upper incisors are common dental changes associated with the Twin Block appliance. These dental movements help in correcting the anterior-posterior misalignment between the upper and lower jaws, effectively reducing the overjet and improving bite alignment. However, the proclination of the lower incisors should be monitored to avoid excessive tipping.

Molar Movements:

- Twin Block appliances also cause distal movement of the upper molars and mesial movement of the lower molars, as found by Mills and McCulloch. These movements help in creating a Class I molar relationship, which is crucial for the long-term stability of the occlusion. This repositioning of the molars supports the correction of the Class II malocclusion.

Vertical Dimension Adjustments:

- Jena et al. reported that the Twin Block appliance can lead to an increase in vertical facial height, particularly in patients with deep bites. By promoting molar eruption and controlling vertical jaw growth, the appliance improves the bite and enhances facial harmony. The vertical dimension control can be customised by adjusting the appliance's bite blocks.

== Advantages ==
- Effective Class II Correction and Facial Aesthetics

As per the studies by Baccetti et al., the Twin Block appliance is highly effective for correcting Class II malocclusions. By positioning the mandible forward, it encourages both skeletal and dental adaptations, which significantly improve the relationship between the jaws. The research shows that the appliance can bring about profound changes in the mandibular position, leading to improved occlusal relationships and facial aesthetics.

- Improved Emotional health:

Lund and Sandler's research found that patients using the Twin Block appliance often show a noticeable improvement in their facial profile. The forward positioning of the mandible reduces the prominence of the upper incisors and enhances jaw symmetry, providing a more balanced and harmonious facial appearance. This aesthetic improvement is particularly beneficial for patients with a retrusive mandible.

In addition, studies by O'Brien et al. emphasise the substantial psychological benefits associated with orthodontic treatment, particularly through appliances such as the Twin Block. For adolescent patients, improving facial aesthetics can lead to significant gains in self-esteem and overall psychological well-being. Given the heightened sensitivity of adolescents to their physical appearance, addressing malocclusions and facial profile concerns not only enhances their outward appearance but also positively influences their emotional health. As self-confidence improves, adolescents often experience enhanced social interactions, reduced social anxiety, and greater mental well-being, underscoring the importance of orthodontic interventions in promoting both physical and psychological development during this critical period of growth.

- High Patient Compliance:

O'Brien et al. and McNamara reported that the Twin Block appliance is favoured by both patients and practitioners for its comfort and ease of use. Because the appliance is removable, patients find it more convenient, which encourages better compliance compared to fixed appliances. Better compliance with wear leads to more effective treatment outcomes.

Sandler et al. also confirmed that the design of the appliance, with its ability to be removed during meals and oral hygiene practices, contributes to the higher satisfaction rates reported by patients.

- Improvement in Airway Function:

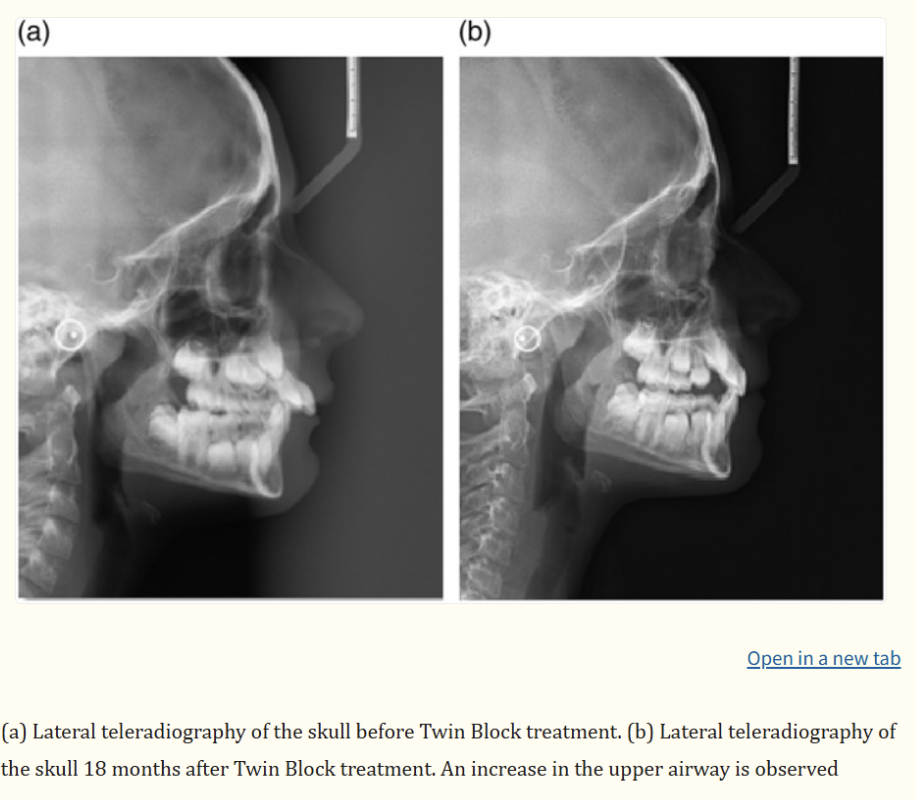
Figure 12

Singh et al. found that the Twin Block appliance can improve airway function by increasing the posterior airway space. This advancement in the mandible can be particularly beneficial for patients suffering from obstructive sleep apnea (OSA) or other breathing difficulties, as it helps to reduce airway obstruction during sleep. This makes the appliance useful not only for orthodontic correction but also for improving overall health and breathing.

- Early and Efficient Correction:

Research by Mills and McCulloch emphasises that the Twin Block appliance is highly effective when initiated early in the patient's growth phase. It allows for efficient Class II correction over a shorter duration compared to other orthodontic methods. Early treatment ensures that skeletal growth can be utilised, preventing the need for more invasive procedures later in life like premolar extractions or orthognathic surgery in severe cases.

== Indications ==
=== Visual Treatment Objective ===
Before the commencement of the functional appliance therapy, a Visual Treatment Objective (VTO) must be done. According to Ricketts, VTO is a visual plan to forecast the normal growth of the patient and anticipated influences of treatment, to establish individual objectives that are to be achieved for that patient.

When planning Twin Block treatment, establishing a positive visual treatment objective (VTO) is crucial to determine if the appliance is suitable for the patient's specific needs such as shown in Figure 23 A) and B). The VTO involves assessing both dental and facial aesthetics to ensure that advancing the mandible will result in a harmonious profile and optimal alignment of teeth.

If the initial evaluation reveals that mandibular advancement worsens the patient's profile or leads to excessive proclination of the lower incisors, this suggests that Twin Block therapy may not be appropriate.

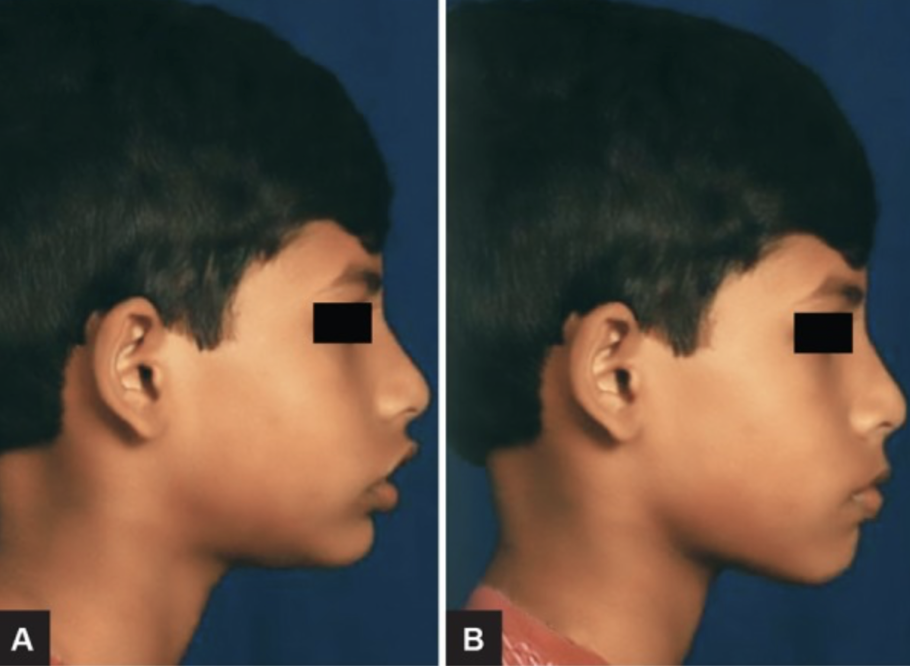
Figure 13: Image A) and B) showing profile view for the VTO of a patient prior to treatment with TBA. B) Indicates a positive VTO as the facial profile has improved.

In such cases, alternative orthodontic approaches, such as extraction followed by fixed appliances, may be more effective in achieving balanced facial aesthetics and dental alignment.

Properly utilising the VTO during diagnosis helps prevent complications associated with overcorrecting the mandibular position and ensures that the chosen treatment aligns with the patient's overall facial profile goals.

Several areas of the head and jaw regions shown in Figure 24 will be calculated in order to predict the growth and outcome of treatment. Those areas include:

1. Prediction of the base of the skull

2. Lower jaw growth prediction

3. Upper jaw growth prediction

4. Occlusal plane position

5. Location of the teeth (dentition)

6. Soft tissue of the face

In case of TBA, this VTO will help in figuring out whether orthodontic or surgical treatment can achieve the desired outcome of fixing the Class II Malocclusion.

=== TBA Indications ===
According to Salloum et al. twin block appliances are indicated for children and growing adolescents. The treatment phase depends on their growth spurt whereby it is said to be more successful in girls around the ages 10 to 13 years old and boys being in their 11 to 14 years of age.

Salloum et al. recommended the treatment with TBA to be timed to match the pubertal growth spurt of growing adolescents. However, this treatment does not guarantee the complete correction of a Class II Div 1 malocclusion, most of the time patients require a second phase of braces together with teeth extractions if mandated.

Starting treatment too early during the mixed dentition period would lead to a longer treatment period compared to delaying until teen years.

Furthermore, certain characteristics should be met before the commencement of treatment under twin block appliances.

In particular:

- Class II skeletal discrepancy which are mild and moderate with facial symmetry and low or average frankfort-mandibular plane angle.
- Both of arches of the jaw should not be crowded.
- The upper incisors should be positioned in forward (proclined).
- The lower incisors should either be slightly tilted inwards (retroclined) or upright in position.
- The molars should have a slight misalignment that makes the top molar positioned slightly in front from the bottom ones ( half unit or greater class II molar relation).

== Contraindications ==
While Twin Block appliances are effective for many Class II malocclusions, there are some specific cases where they may not be suitable. The success of this treatment hinges on selecting the right cases, and certain factors—particularly related to tooth structure—can make it less effective or even inadvisable. The following are the key reasons why Twin Block appliances might not be appropriate:

- Severe Crowding in the Teeth If a patient has significant crowding, especially in the lower arch, Twin Block treatment might not work well. When there is not enough space for the teeth, simply advancing the mandible will not solve the problem. For example, if the incisors are already pushed forward (proclined), moving the jaw forward would only worsen the alignment. In these cases, removing some teeth (extractions) is often needed to create space, and fixed braces are needed to straighten the teeth.
- Vertical Growth Patterns Patients with a vertical growth pattern, where the lower face is longer, often do not respond well to Twin Block treatment. This is because moving the mandible forward does not reduce the lower facial height or fix the tooth alignment. Instead, their profile and teeth might stay misaligned even after treatment. For these patients, it is usually better to consider other orthodontic options, to fix the alignment and improve their appearance or Twin Block needs to be worn with high pull headgear extraorally.
- Protruding Teeth and Profiles When a patient's incisors are already sticking out too far, Twin Block treatment can be problematic. If the lower front teeth are already far ahead (proclined) of their ideal position, moving the mandible forward will not help align the teeth properly—it could actually make things worse. Similarly, if advancing the jaw during diagnosis does not improve how the profile looks (negative VTO), it is a sign that Twin Block treatment might not be right. For these cases, removing some teeth and using fixed braces tends to work better for straightening the teeth and improving the overall profile.
- Strongly Forward-Positioned Mandible Some patients naturally have a mandible that is already quite far forward (prognathic), and in these cases, advancing the jaw any further would only make the facial features more imbalanced. For these individuals, the better approach is to focus on aligning the upper teeth with braces rather than attempting to move the jaw forward. Correcting the upper teeth can provide the desired improvement without altering the jaw position.
- Imbalances Between the Jaw and Teeth Twin Block appliances are most effective when the relationship between the jaws and teeth is relatively balanced. However, in cases where there is a big mismatch—such as a small and retrusive lower jaw with a vertical growth pattern—the appliance may not work as hoped. In these situations, a more tailored treatment plan, involving tooth extractions and braces, is often needed to address both the tooth and jaw alignment issues.

== Comparison with other appliances ==
=== Frankel 2 appliance versus Modified Twin Block appliance ===
- The Frankel Regulator 2 (FR2) shown in Figure 25 A) is the only functional appliance that relies on soft tissue support, whereas the Twin Block Appliance (TBA) in Figure 25 B) and its modifications (MTB) are widely used tooth-borne alternatives.
- In 11–14-year-old patients with Class II division 1 malocclusion, Phase 1 treatment duration, number of appliance breakages, occlusal outcomes, and feedback from both patients and parents were similar between the FR2 and MTB.
- However, in the study setting, the FR2 was twice as expensive as the MTB, making cost a key factor in appliance selection.
- A study also suggested that the FR-2 appliance mainly produced a skeletal effect, while the TBA is capable of making skeletal and dentoalveolar changes.

Figure 15: A) FR2 and B) MTB

=== Dynamax appliances versus Twin-block ===
- Dynamax appliance shown in Figure 26 was introduced in 2003 for treating Class II malocclusion. Its design aims to:
  1. enable easy incremental mandibular advancement by the operator.
  2. combine the functional phase with the fixed appliance phase for the mandibular arch.
  3. control mandibular incisor proclination and maxillary incisor retroclination.
  4. minimise any increase in lower facial height.
- An interim analysis at 18 months found that the Twin-block appliance was more effective in reducing overjet than the Dynamax appliance.
- Dynamax appliance had a higher rate of breakages and adverse events. Due to these issues, treatment with the Dynamax was discontinued, and patients transitioned to the Twin-block or a fixed appliance.

Figure 16: Dynamax appliance

=== Herbst appliance versus Twin Block appliance ===
- Treatment with the Herbst appliance shown in Figure 27 had a lower failure-to-complete rate (12.9%) compared to the Twin-block in Figure 28 (33.6%).
- Both of them required a similar overall treatment duration. However, the Herbst appliance required more repair appointments due to frequent debonding and component breakage.
- Skeletal and dental outcomes were similar between the two appliances, but girls showed better treatment responses than boys.
- The Herbst appliance seen in Figure 28 offers better compliance than the Twin Block but comes at a higher cost due to its construction and the need for additional repair visits.
- Herbst appliance was also determined to be more effective on the movement of the mandibular bone than the twin block appliance. However, TBA yielded more promising results in enhancing the facial aesthetics and the molar relationships.

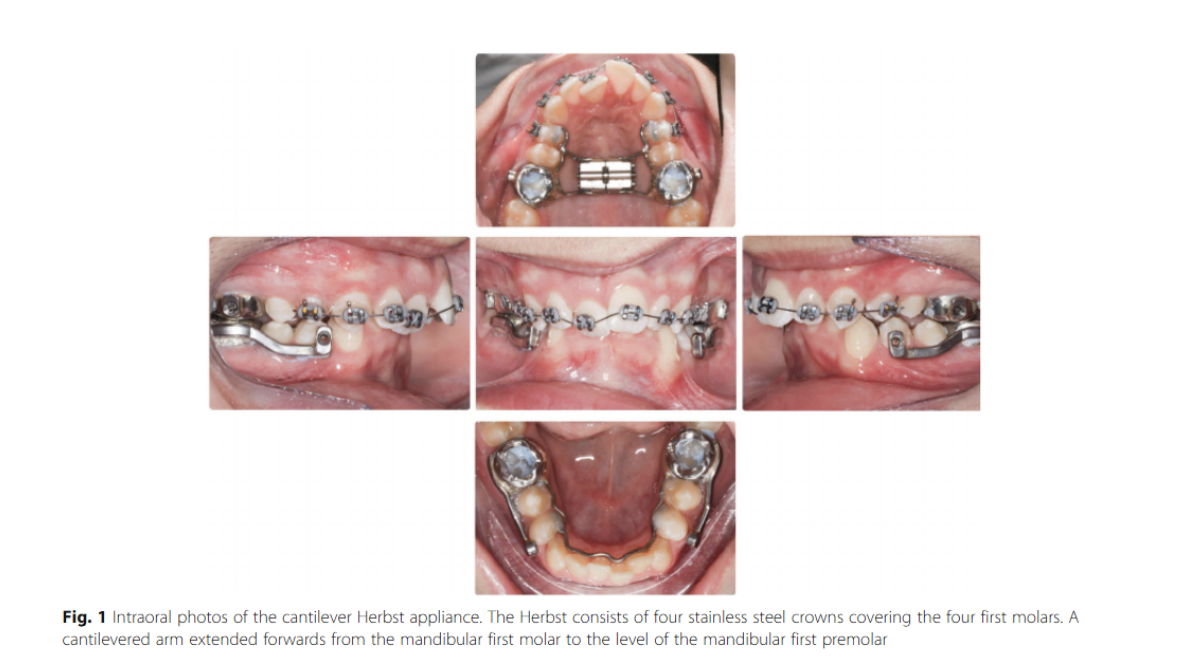
Figure 14: Design of Herbst appliance

=== Twin-block versus bionator appliance ===
- Both the Twin-block and bionator appliances effectively corrected molar relationships and reduced overjet in children with Class II Division 1 malocclusion.
- While neither appliance restricted maxillary forward growth, but both promoted mandibular growth, with the Twin-block inducing greater advancement.
- Both appliances limited forward movement of maxillary molars but facilitated mesial movement of mandibular molars, with the Twin-block being slightly more effective.
- Both appliances restricted forward movement of maxillary incisors but promoted forward movement of mandibular incisors.
- Overall, both appliances were effective, but the Twin-block appliance was better than the bionator in molar correction and overjet reduction.

=== Functional appliances versus extraoral traction ===
- Both the functional appliances (twin block) and extraoral traction enhances the sagittal relationship of the maxilla and mandible.
- However, the twin block shows an effect on the mandible and shows an improvement in overjet reduction whereas the extraoral traction presents a huge effect on the maxilla and there is less improvement in overjet.

Videos on:

Twin block appliance:

https://www.youtube.com/watch?v=BdGRj_KY054

Tips & tricks:

https://www.youtube.com/watch?v=e30SPayJF8Y
