= Activator appliance =

Orthodontics appliance

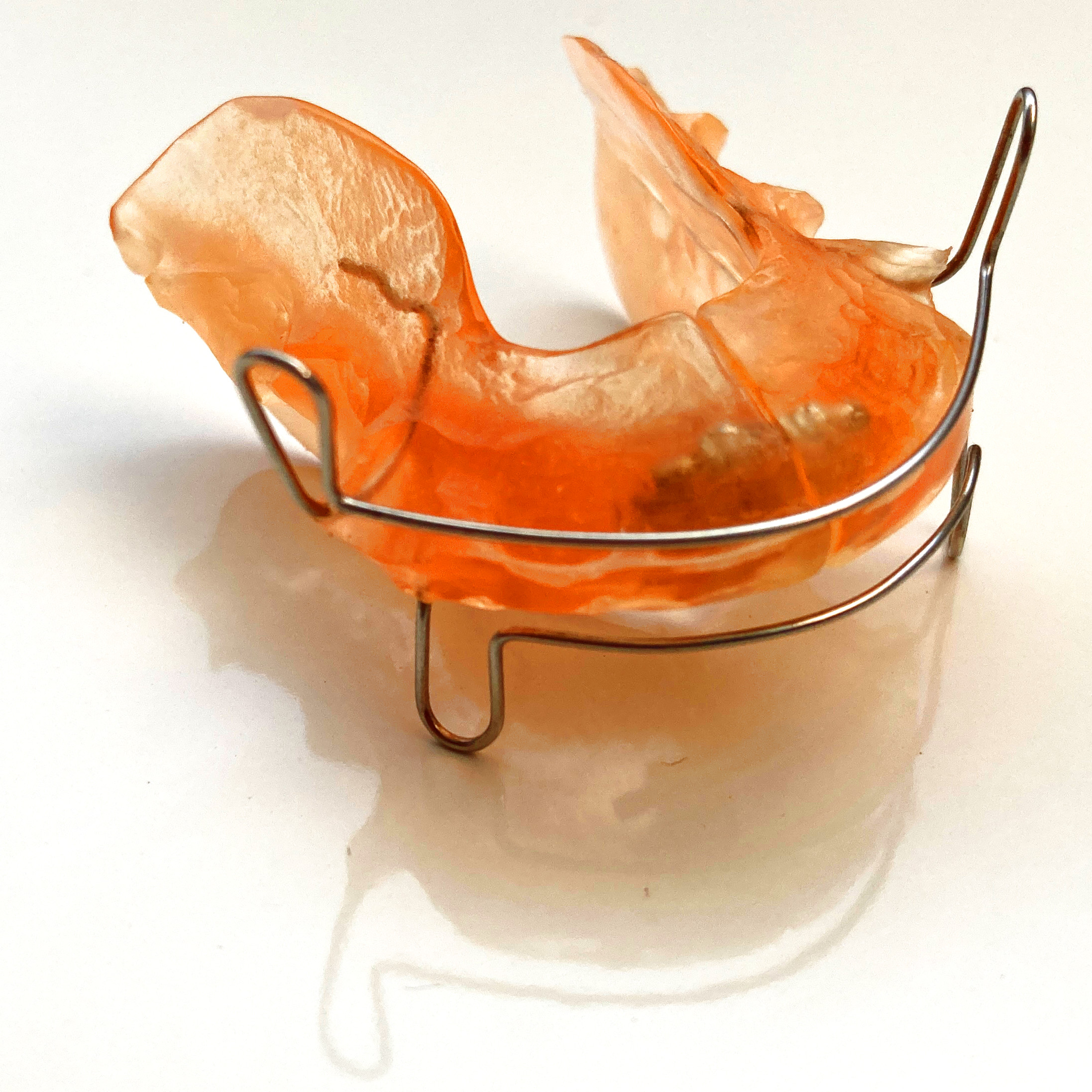
Activator appliance with expansion screw

Activator Appliance is an Orthodontics appliance that was developed by Viggo Andresen in 1908. This was one of the first functional appliances that was developed to correct functional jaw in the early 1900s. Activator appliance became the universal appliance that was used widely throughout Europe in the earlier part of the 20th century.

== History ==
Viggo Andersen first used this appliance on his daughter's mandibular teeth in the summer of 1908. He took the mechanical braces off from his daughter, and he had her wear the "Biofunctional Retainer" throughout the summer in the mandibular arch. The maxillary arch received Hawley retainer. After a while, Viggo realized that her daughter's occlusion remained the same. He then started using his retainer in his own private practice on his patients, and he saw similar results. Viggo, who was born in Denmark, moved to Norway in the 1920s. There he met Karl Haupl with whom Viggo devised the name "Activator" to describe his appliance. Haupl and Andersen worked closely together and published many textbooks pertaining to the Activator Appliance. The name Activator was first used in their first edition of textbook in the 1920s. Haupl believed that "Shaking of Bone Hypothesis" by Wilhelm Roux was the functional concept that described how the appliance would work. Their way of working with this appliance was named as the "Norwegian System". The original activator was tooth-borne, passive appliance which was indicated to be loose-fitting.

== Indications ==
Activator appliance was initially indicated in patient's who are growing. Therefore, young adolescents with growth potential showed the best results of this appliance. In addition, an adolescent or adult patient with retrognathic mandible, well aligned maxillary and mandibular dentition were also other indications of this appliance. Some of the malocclusions that can be treated with this appliance included Class II Division I, Class II Division II, Class III and Open Bites.

== Mode of Action ==
1st View - The mode of action for this appliance involved many different views throughout the existence of appliance. The initially theory consisted of Haupl-Andersen's ideas who believed that Isometric Muscular Contraction caused by Myotatic reflex activity was the primary way functional adaptation of the appliance took place. The functional adaptation led to a new way of mandibular closing pattern. This view was later supported by Alexandre Petrovic (1984) and McNamara (1973). Petrovic, in the 1970s, performed studies which found that Lateral pterygoid muscle played an important role on Mandibular condyle cartilage growth.

2nd View - This view was presented by Egil Peter Harvold (1974), Donald Woodside (1973) and Selmer-Olsen, Herren (1953). This view completely disregarded the Myotatic reflex as the basis to describe the functional adaptation. Proponents of this view believed that Viscoelastic Properties of Muscle and stretching of soft tissues was the primary way of functional adaptation. They believed in creating the construction bite opening which was beyond the postural rest position. They believed that the mandible would be engaged more if the bite is opened more.

== Components ==
Activator consists of acrylic components and wire components.

=== Acrylic ===
Activator appliance initially started out as one block of acrylic which fit in both maxillary and mandibular arch. The lower arch would see the horseshoe shaped lingual plate acrylic extending from distal of the last erupted molar. In the upper arch, initially the anterior portion is covered from canine to canine, but that was later modified, as seen with appliances such as Bionator Appliance which placed its emphasis on the tongue function.

=== Wire ===
The wire components of activator included a labial bow which was usually placed 1mm away from the front incisors and extended from canine to canine. The bow would be 0.9 - 0.8mm thick. Additional wire elements were later added to stabilize the appliance.

== Construction Bite ==
The construction bite of Activator can consist of two types: Horizontal (H) Activator and Vertical (V) Activator.

=== H Activator ===
This type of construction bite involves significant changes in the sagittal or Anterio-Posterior dimension. Therefore, the mandible is brought forward by 6-7mm and it is opened 3-4mm. the vertical opening follows an individual's normal postural rest position.

=== V Activator ===
This type of construction bite involves significant changes in the vertical dimension. Thus mandible is only brought forward by 2-3mm but vertically the bite is opened by at least 7-8mm.

== Types ==
=== Kinetor Activator (1951) ===
This type of activator was developed by Hugo Stockfish. This appliance had latex tubing between the upper and lower parts to stimulate function. This appliance was again modified for a longer usage for patients.

=== Bow Activator of A.M Schwarz (1956) ===
Schwarz modified the original activator appliance by making activator a two part appliance and connecting it with elastic bow. He said that the bow allows periodic adjustment of sagittal relationship of activator over time. This modification allowed transverse mobility, which was not present in previous modifications, and Schwarz believed that this provided additional stimulus for functional development. However, one of the disadvantages of this modification was that the appliance was easily distortable.

=== Herren's Activator (1953) ===
Herren modified the Activator appliance by including clasps on the appliance. He stated that the clasps allowed the activator to attach to the maxillary dentition, and thus make it more stable. He worried that slight movement of mandible during sleeping will allow the activator to fall out. He also extended the acrylic towards the floor of the mandible to restrict the movement of mandible. He believed in maximal sagittal advancement of the construction bite with 8-10mm vertical opening.

=== LSU or Shaye Activator ===
This type of activator was modification of the Herren's Activator. Robert Shage from LSU modified activator by having lower incisors bite on a plane formed by acrylic to impede the growth in occlusal direction. The occlusal acrylic on the posterior teeth was grounded away to assist in eruption of the molars, premolars. Therefore, he wanted to level the occlusal plane this way.

=== Elastic Open Activator of G. Klammt (1960) ===
This modification was developed by G. Klammt. This appliance was modified to include reduced acrylic for the purpose of patient compliance. The acrylic was replaced with wires which increase the flexibility of the appliance. This appliance resembled the Bionator Appliance.

=== Nite-Guide®/Occlus-o-Guide®/Ortho-T® Activators ===
Constructed from an elastomeric material, these original preformed activators are used in the primary to adult dentition but ideal for use in the early through late mixed dentition (these studies utilized Ortho-Tain's Nite-Guide® and/or Occlus-o-Guide®). Along with their activator properties, ideal for correction of class II malocclusion, being based on tooth size, these appliances aptly coined EGAs (Eruptive Guidance Appliances) also function as a positioner along with correcting overbite and mild to moderate crowding.

=== Harvold/Woodside Activator (1971) ===
Their modification included creating construction bite which allowed the bite to open around 10-15mm beyond the postural rest position of the mandible. They believed that viscoelastic properties of soft muscles and elasticity of soft tissues were predominating ways of how muscular adaptation and changes in form happened. Their sagittal opening remained around 3-5mm distal to the maximum protrusion of one's jaw.

=== Palate Free Activator (1974) ===
This modification was proposed by shaMohammed to combine the advantages of bionator and activator. The palatal area in this modification remains free of acrylic, making the appliance more convenient for patients and them being able to wear it for longer periods of time. The mandibular part of this appliance was same as the original mandibular part of activator, only the maxillary modification was added.

=== Propulsor (1980) ===
This modification had no wire connecting the upper and lower parts. Acrylic connected the upper and lower part with acrylic flanges. This type of activator was designed by Muhlemann and refined by Hotz. This appliance is sometimes known as the hybrid appliance because it has features of vestibular screen and monobloc.

=== U Bow Activator ===
This modification was made by Karwetzky. In this modification, the maxillary and mandibular active plates are joined at the 1st permanent molar region using a U-shaped bow. The bow is made up of 1 mm SS wire. The short leg is embedded in the upper plate and long leg is embedded in the lower plate.

=== Wunderer Activator ===
Wunderer made a modification of the activator to be used for the patients with Class III malocclusions. The appliance was split horizontally into an upper and lower part and a screw connect the two pieces of appliance. The occlusal surface of incisors in both arches are covered with acrylic. The screw used is named as Weise Screw. Turning the screw lead to the maxillary arch to move anteriorly and a back thrust of the mandible

=== Hamilton Expansion Activator ===
This type of activator was designed by Hamilton who used the expansion of an arch in this approach. The appliance has a screw in the middle for expansion. The activator is bonded to the maxillary arch and the forward guidance of the mandible can happen due to the lingual flanges of the appliance. This type of appliance is used in non-compliant patients.

=== Cybernator or Reduced Activator ===
The acrylic in this type of activator is reduced. However, the labial bow is retained in this type of activator. A feature of this appliance is Coffin Spring which is used in the maxillary arch which may help with expansion of the upper arch.

=== LM-Activator ===
This type of activator is particularly suitable for treatment in the early mixed dentition but can also be used in other stages of dental development. In addition to guiding the mandible to a Class I relationship, it can also be used to align teeth and to correct crowding. The LM-Activator is made of silicone.

== Headgear and Activator Therapy ==
=== Stockli-Teuscher Approach ===
In this type of approach, we can see that the inner bows are completely embedded in the labial side of the maxillary splint. The outer arms are bent upwards depending on the angle that is desired for the occlusal plane.

=== Hickam Approach ===
He placed the hooks on the labial bow to receive the J hook headgear.

== See also ==
- Hans Peter Bimler
- List of orthodontic functional appliances
