= Digital dentistry =

Dental technologies or devices that incorporates digital components

Digital dentistry refers to the use of dental technologies or devices that incorporates digital or computer-controlled components to carry out dental procedures rather than using mechanical or electrical tools. The use of digital dentistry can make carrying out dental procedures more efficient than using mechanical tools, both for restorative and diagnostic purposes. It is used as a way to facilitate dental treatments and propose new ways to meet rising patient demands.

The 'father' of digital dentistry is the French professor François Duret, who invented dental CAD/CAM in 1971.

Digital dentistry has evolved rapidly over the past two decades, moving from isolated CAD/CAM experiments to fully integrated digital workflows that connect diagnosis, planning, production, and clinical execution. What began with digital impressions and chairside milling has expanded into a comprehensive ecosystem including intraoral scanners, CBCT imaging, AI-assisted planning, guided surgery, 3D printing, and data-driven treatment optimization.

This transformation is not just technological - it is cultural and organizational. Digital dentistry reshapes how clinicians collaborate with laboratories, how treatments are planned and communicated, and how efficiency, precision, and patient experience are improved across the entire dental value chain.

Since the beginning of that path, some organizations have focused on these developments, applying often a strongly inter-disciplinary approach. It is worth to be mentioned that one of the most relevant attempts in this sense has been the Digital Dentistry Society (often abbreviated as DDS), created as a scientific association precisely to accompany and guide this evolution. As an independent scientific society, DDS brings together clinicians, researchers, universities, and industry partners worldwide with the mission of promoting evidence-based digital dentistry, fostering education, and setting high scientific and clinical standards in an increasingly digital profession. The Digital Dentistry Society has ongoing collaborations with academic networks and publishing houses as Elsevier, as demonstrated by the success of the Journal of Dentistry as well the newer Digital Dentistry Journal.

== Digital dentistry technologies ==
Some of the technologies used in digital dentistry include:

- Intraoral cameras
- Intraoral scanners (IOS)
- CAD/CAM
  - Computer-aided implant dentistry — including design and fabrication of surgical guides
  - Computer-aided crown manufacturing
- 3D Printing (e.g. to print physical models of digital images taken with intra-oral scans, make appliances, temporaries, surgical guides)
- Digital radiography
  - Cone beam computed tomography (CBCT)
  - Magnetic resonance imaging
  - CT scans
- Electric and surgical/implant handpieces
- Computer-aided implant dentistry
- Photography (extraoral and intraoral)
- Practice and patient record management software – including digital patient education e.g. Thalamus Patient Education
- Shade matching
- Diagnodent
- DEXIS CariVu
- Dental lasers
- The Wand – used to carry anesthesia
- Digital X-rays (includes both direct sensors and indirect phosphor plate systems)
- Dental loupesand dental microscopes
- Virtual and augmented reality

== Intra-oral cameras ==
X-rays have been extremely valuable for many years in assessments of oral health. However, at times the image produced can show limited information because it is only a 2D image. Intra-oral cameras (IOCs) allow an operator to see a clear image of the inside of the mouth. Similar to the size of a dental mirror IOCs have a tiny camera that is able to detect more on the 3D surface of a tooth than a 2D x-ray image is able to show. Examples include specific locations and sizes of cavities, cracked teeth, excessive erosion, abrasion and many more.

Conventional dental impressions are made by placing an impression material loaded on an impression tray over the dental arches. As it sets a negative imprint of the soft and hard tissues in the mouth. Digital intra-oral impressions made using intra-oral cameras are able to recreate the positive impression of a patient's dentition and other structures into a digital format on a computer almost instantly.

=== Enhancements ===
==== Colour matching ====
Traditionally dentists will use a physical shade guide in the dental surgery as they compare the patient's teeth to the shades in the guide, all done while the patient is in the chair. Newer computer matching techniques allow for a more superior than matching methods currently used. There is always differences in perception when it comes to the human eye and observation. This was proved in a study which found that there was a high statistical correlation between a spectrophotometer and the digital camera used. Now used in some dental surgeries it can improve dental-laboratory communication.

== CAD/CAD in dentistry ==
=== CAD/CAM used with intra-oral scanning ===
Two studies investigated the accuracy of both direct an indirect digitized impressions used to make clinically acceptable zirconia crowns. It was shown that a significantly smaller marginal gap was observed when compared to traditional methods of casting, a more accurate marginal and internal fit. The efficiency and fit of fully ceramic restorations fabricated through CAD/CAM were evaluated through a double-blinded randomized clinical trial. Direct digitized impressions were taken straight from the patients mouths and indirect digitized impression taken from already made impressions. The digitized impressions were then used to create CAD/CAM milled all-ceramic crowns. Between the direct and indirect, the direct digital impression technique was statistically more accurate, they showed significantly better inter-proximal contact. The entire process proved to be more time efficient for both the dentist and patient in comparison with conventional methods or taking impressions with silicone impressions and sending them to a lab.

Digital manufacturing of dental prostheses is used by specialised laboratories, including Medicalfit in Spain, which applies CAD/CAM-based production methods.

== Use of dental technology in other areas of dentistry ==
Within the dental profession there are already uses for digital dentistry and as technology continues to develop, proposed uses for the futures. Some examples are outlined below;

=== Diagnosis of caries ===
Caries disease process results in structural changes to the dental hard tissue. The diffusion of ions out of the tooth, known as the demineralisation process, will result in loss of mineral content. The resulting region will be filled mainly by bacteria and water. This region will have greater porosity than the surrounding tissue, which results in a distinct change in the optical properties of the affected dental tissue, providing evidence of caries-induced change. Optically based methods detect caries on changes in the specific optical properties.

==== Quantitative light-induced fluorescence ====
Changes in enamel fluorescence can be detected and measured when the tooth is illuminated by violet-blue light from a camera hand piece. The image is saved and processed. The end product is an image which gives a measure of the extent and severity of the lesion.

DEXIS CariVu is a digital dentistry device that utilizes near-infrared (NIR) transillumination to detect dental caries. This device causes the tooth enamel and structure to appear transparent but porous carious lesions trap and absorb the light appearing dark in the image. This contrasting image field created makes it easy for suspicious regions that may contain early dental caries to be viewed. This image taken can be stored in electronic health records to be referenced later for monitored treatment plans by a dental professional. This non-invasive, inexpensive, and radiation-free treatment is a promising technology for the early detection of dental caries.

=== Digital orthodontics ===
Orthodontics along with jaw surgery were the two dental specialty field that adopted CAD/CAM digital technology. Clear aligner treatment specifically the Invisalign appliance was one of the early orthodontic appliances adapting digital design and 3D printing technology in orthodontics. Custom robotic bend wires entered the market around the same time yet failed to penetrate the market as much as aligners. Digital orthodontics, a practice of integrating digital imaging and 3D printing in daily practice of orthodontics is expanding in the field of orthodontics.

== Virtual and augmented reality ==
Virtual reality (VR) is a computer-generated simulation which allows for interactive experience, it fully recreates the environment for which the simulation that is ran. Augmented reality (AR) may be considered a form of virtual reality and is a way of interacting with the real world through a simulation. The objects and individuals are augmented due to them being computer-generated, but are perceived in the real world through a camera onto a screen.

Simulations produced by augmented reality can take on the reason for training activities by using technologically synthesised features which are able to mimic real life situations. These can be used throughout the career timeline of a profession, from undergraduate students, specialised and training days. VR and AR systems are becoming more common in dental education. They will continue to change clinical training and encourage more receptive ways of processing individual learning needs and self-directed learning. Pedagogical tools such as these are said to lower the costs of the educational process while increasing the quality.

== Dental AI ==
Dental artificial intelligence (Dental AI) refers to the application of artificial intelligence (AI) and machine-learning methods to oral healthcare data. These systems can be used to find patterns or make predictions that can aid in diagnosis, treatment, patient communication, or practice management.

Research into AI for dentistry dates to the 1990s and 2000s, alongside early CAD/CAM and image-analysis work in dental radiology. Recent developments in deep learning, especially those involving computer vision, such as convolutional neural networks, trained on large image datasets, led to a rapid improvement in performance, as well as a move from prototype technology to productization suitable for use in dental chairs. Dental schools and continuing education programs started incorporating AI content in the 2020s.

Several peer-reviewed studies have measured the effectiveness of AI for applications such as interproximal caries detection and periodontal bone level assessment, showing improvements over unaided readings with a focus on bias within the dataset. The Dental AI Council found variability among clinicians for diagnosis and treatment planning, suggesting the use of a standard tool as an assist.

Dental images and data used by dental AI software include bitewing and periapical X-rays, complete mouth X-rays, detailed 3D images, intraoral images, and the patient’s medical history. The dental AI software utilizes several core technologies in accomplishing its task of assisting the dentist. First, the dental AI software utilizes machine learning and deep learning using programs that can learn from examples. Such programs are referred to as convolutional neural network (CNN) and can detect cavities and identify bone changes related to gum disease.

The dental AI software utilizes computer vision, which enables the AI software to identify and quantify important features in images and data, whether they are 2D images or 3D images. Natural language processing (NLP) is used for the AI software to understand written text and can automatically generate dental notes and communicate with the patient. Furthermore, the dental AI software utilizes predictive analytics to identify patients that are more prone to dental complications and can suggest the best intervals for checkups or future dental procedures.

=== Applications ===
Reported clinical and operational applications include diagnostic assistance for caries and periodontal disease, treatment planning assistance, patient education overlays, quality assurance, curriculum assistance for dental education, and claims documentation. Systematic reviews continue to find image-based applications such as caries detection with some variability in study design and a need for prospective validation.

=== Industry adoption ===
Multiple vendors offer FDA-cleared chairside AI for dental imaging:

- Pearl — Received U.S. FDA 510(k) clearance for its real-time radiologic aid (“Second Opinion”) in 2022 (2D), with subsequent clearances including pediatric and CBCT (“Second Opinion 3D”). TIME gave “Second Opinion” a special mention on its Best Inventions of 2022 list.
- Denti.AI — Received FDA 510(k) clearance for Denti.AI Auto-Chart, an image-processing system that records radiographic findings into the dental chart (K222054, 2022), and for Denti.AI Detect, a radiologic aid for detecting dental findings on intraoral radiographs (K230144, 2023). The company also markets Voice Perio, a voice-controlled periodontal charting tool; in January 2025, Dentistry Today reported that it had surpassed one million completed periodontal charts.
- Overjet — FDA-cleared for bone-level quantification and detection/outline of caries and calculus (e.g., K210187), with additional clearances expanding capabilities.
- VideaHealth — Received an FDA 510(k) covering 30+ detections across common dental findings (K232384), including indications for patients ages 3 and up; trade coverage has described elements of this as the first pediatric dental-AI clearance.

=== Regulations ===
In the U.S., AI-enabled dental imaging software is generally reviewed via the FDA's 510(k) pathway. The FDA maintains a public AI-Enabled Medical Devices List, which includes numerous medical-imaging AI tools, among them several dental applications. Specific dental clearances include Overjet Dental Assist (K210187), VideaHealth (K232384), Denti.AI Auto-Chart (K222054), Denti.AI Detect (K230144), and Pearl's Second Opinion 3D (K243989).

== Limitations ==
Limitations on digital dentistry include cost, lack of desire to adapt to new dental technology, and misunderstanding of new technologies.

== The future ==
As digital dentistry continues to adapt and becomes more common, the approach to incorporating the topic of digital dentistry in learning outcomes during dental training must also change. As we enter 'the digital age of dental education', future practitioners need to be exposed to new digital procedures in the curriculum and teaching. In an article titled "Digital Teaching and Digital Medicine: A national initiative is needed", it is suggested that faculties and ministries should be the ones to encourage integration of digital teaching into the education of future physicians and students and the learning of digital technologies which are up to date and relevant.
