= Ibex Global =

American business process outsourcing company

ibex
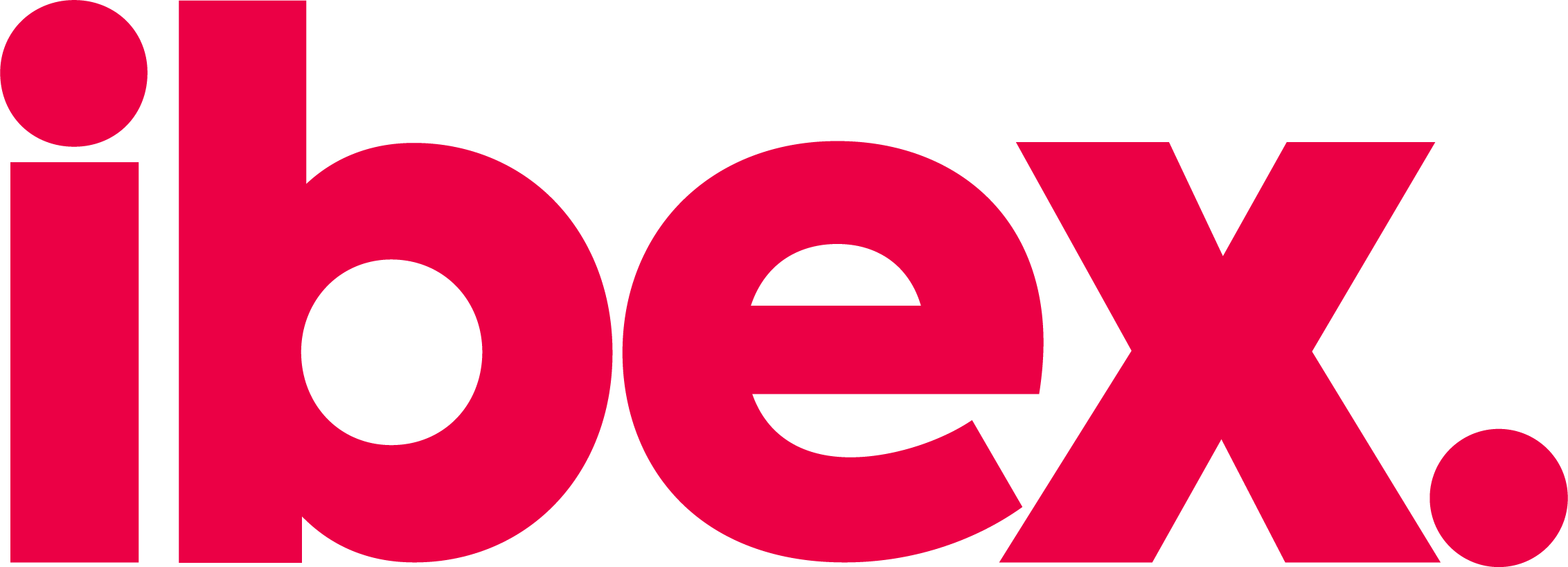
- Company type: Public
- Traded as: Nasdaq: IBEX
- Industry: Business process outsourcing Customer experience
- Founded: 2002; 24 years ago
- Founders: Zia Chishti
- Headquarters: Washington, D.C., United States
- Area served: Worldwide
- Key people: Mohammed Khaishgi (Chairman); Bob Dechant (CEO)
- Products: ibex Wave iX platform
- Services: Customer service outsourcing Technical support Customer acquisition Customer experience
- Revenue: US$558.3 million (2025)
- Number of employees: 33,000+
- Website: ibex.co

ibex Holdings Limited, formerly known as ibex Global and TRG Customer Solutions, is an American business process outsourcing and customer experience technology company headquartered in Washington, D.C. The company provides outsourced contact-centre services, digital customer acquisition, and customer engagement technology.

== History ==
=== 2002–2013: Early history ===
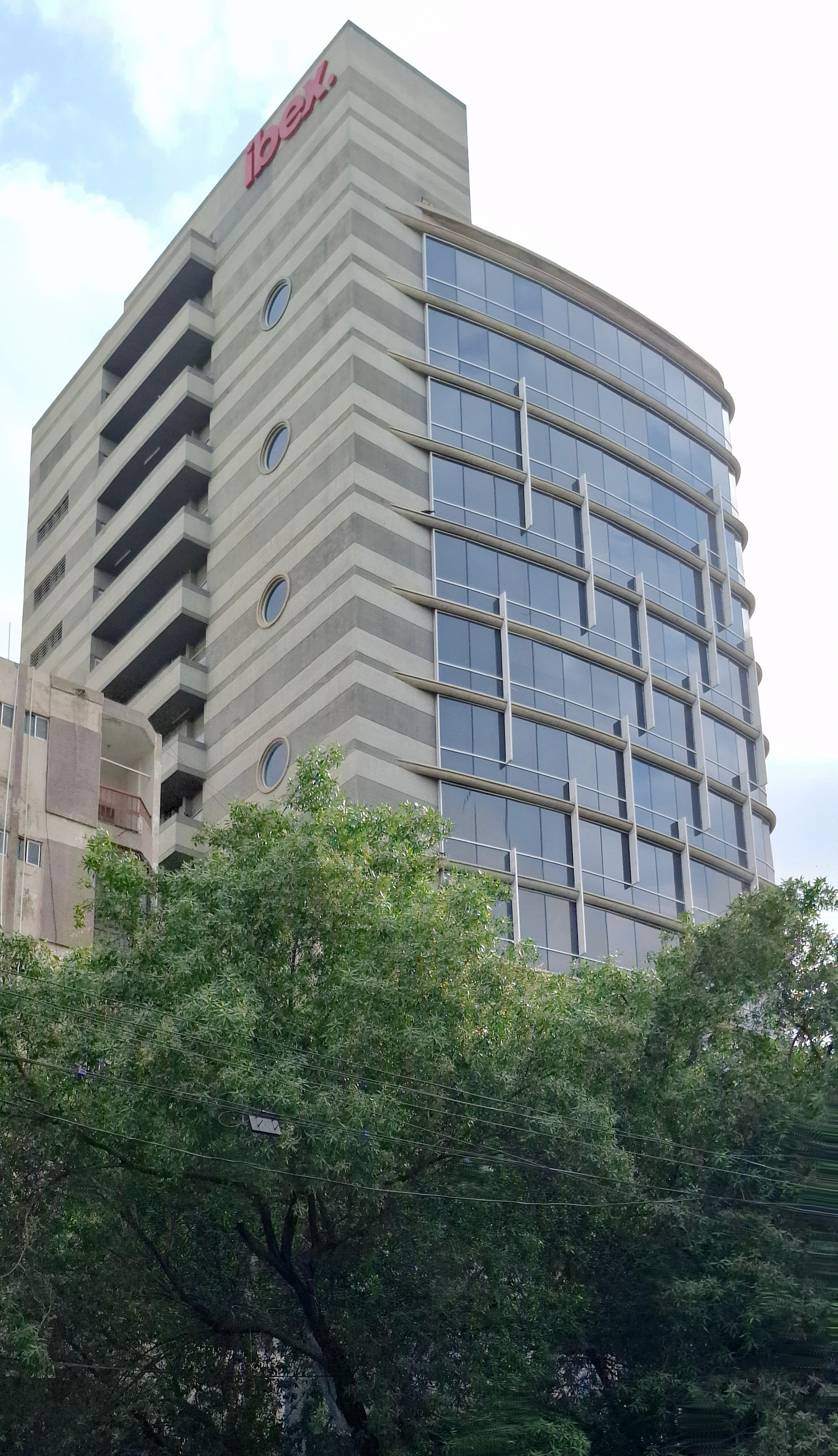
Ibex Tower, Karachi

ibex was developed within The Resource Group, a venture capital and investment holding company founded in the early 2000s by Zia Chishti to make acquisitions in the business process outsourcing industry. The predecessor to ibex's customer experience division was acquired by TRGI in 2004, and a separate customer acquisition business was established as a TRGI subsidiary in 2008.

=== 2013–present: Consolidation, listing, and growth ===
In March 2013, TRG combined its contact-centre assets in the United States, United Kingdom, Pakistan, and Senegal into a single holding company, IBEX Global Solutions plc, which was admitted to trading on the London Stock Exchange's Alternative Investment Market (AIM) on 28 June 2013. In 2014, ibex opened a call centre in Spring Hill, Tennessee, which the company occupied for over a decade. Robert Dechant joined the company in 2015 and later became chief executive officer.

In 2016, after a takeover by TRGI, ibex was delisted from AIM, and the following year the group was reorganised under a new Bermuda-incorporated parent, IBEX Limited, which consolidated TRGI's customer-experience and customer acquisition businesses, including AIM-listed predecessor Digital Globe Services. In 2018, ibex closed a call centre in Indiana, Pennsylvania, laying off 105 employees after losing a client contract. The company filed an initial public offering with the U.S. Securities and Exchange Commission in March 2018, before withdrawing it later that year.

In 2020, ibex refiled for a public listing and on 7 August 2020 began trading on the Nasdaq Global Market. Following the offering, TRGI retained a controlling stake of approximately 64% of outstanding common shares.

After its listing, ibex expanded its nearshore and offshore operations. In 2021, the company opened additional sites in the Philippines and the United States, and entered Honduras with a new call center in Tegucigalpa developed in joint venture with local real estate group, Grupo Karim's. In April 2023, ibex closed its Bend, Oregon call centre, ending more than two decades of operations in the city after losing a customer support contract and laid off 100 employees. In 2024, the company closed two of its six Jamaica sites and three onshore U.S. sites.

== Operations ==
ibex operates call centers across the United States, the Philippines, Jamaica, Nicaragua, Honduras, Pakistan, and Senegal. Its services include voice and digital customer service outsourcing, technical support, inbound and outbound sales, business intelligence and analytics, digital demand generation, and customer experience survey and feedback analytics.
