= PlusDental =

German teledentistry company

- Company type: Private
- Industry: Teledentistry
- Founded: 2017 in Berlin, Germany
- Founders: Constantin Bisanz; David Khalil; Peter Baumgart; Lukas Brosseder
- Headquarters: Berlin, Germany
- Area served: Europe
- Products: Clear aligners
- Number of employees: 200 (2020)
- Website: plusdental.de

PlusDental is a German teledentistry company headquartered in Berlin. It produces clear aligners for patients seeking minor dental adjustments. It is available in Germany, Austria, the United Kingdom, and several other European countries.

== History ==
PlusDental was founded in Berlin, Germany by Constantin Bisanz, David Khalil, Peter Baumgart, and Lukas Brosseder in 2017 and was originally known as Sunshine Smile. Early investors included Holtzbrinck Ventures, Roman Kirsch, Christian Vollman, Lakestar, and others. Its initial business model involved sending customers kits to make impressions of their teeth at home and creating a series of increasingly corrective, custom clear aligners based on the resultant 3D models. No visit to a dentist was required at that time. In October 2019, however, PlusDental changed its business model (and its name) and began referring patients to one of 29 partner dental practices throughout Germany, Austria, and Switzerland. From that point, customers were required to see a dentist at least once for an oral cavity scan to create the 3D model of their teeth and jaw. Customers still received their corrective aligners through the mail.

At the end of 2019, PlusDental began entering into non-German speaking markets, including the United Kingdom and Spain. In May 2020, the company announced the closing of a €32-million series C funding round led by the Ping An Global Voyager Fund. In November of that year, it received further investment from Cadence Growth Capital. At that point, the company had expanded its number of partner dentists to 110. In March 2021, co-CEO Eva-Maria Meijnen stated that PlusDental is on its "way to becoming Germany’s first female-led unicorn. By next year at the latest, that will be the case.” In May 2022, DrSmile acquired PlusDental for €131-million, slightly more than the total funding that had flown into the company.

== Products and services ==
PlusDental produces clear dental aligners for patients requiring minor dental adjustments. It creates the aligners at its laboratory in Berlin. Patients must visit one of 110 partner dental practices in Germany, Austria, Switzerland, the United Kingdom, Spain, and other locales in order to undergo an oral cavity scan and produce a 3D model of their jaw and teeth. They then receive the aligners through the mail until the adjustments are complete. Customers may also consult remotely with orthodontists on staff at PlusDental throughout the process, which usually takes between four and 12 months.

PlusDentals services are being criticised by orthodontists all over Europe, because PlusDentals services, as the services of other direct-to-consumer clear aligner companys - are supposed to lack decent diagnostics and sufficient treatment controls.
