= Krishan Kumar Sharma =

Indian zoologist

- Born: 1 January 1954 (age 72)
- Citizenship: India

Academic work
- Discipline: Zoology
- Institutions: Maharshi Dayanand Saraswati University, University of Rajasthan

Krishan Kumar Sharma (born January 1, 1954) is an Indian educator, scientist, and snake educator from Ajmer, India. He has served as a Professor, Dean and Vice-Chancellor of Maharshi Dayanand Saraswati University. He has been working to reduce fatalities from snake bites by educating people, particularly in rural India.

== Early life and education ==
Krishan Kumar Sharma was born in Rajgarh of the district Alwar. His wife, Yashodhara Sharma, has served in a government college in Rajasthan. The family has a daughter and a son. Krishan did his schooling and graduation in Rajgarh. He earned a Master's (1975–1977) and a doctoral degree (1977–82) from the University of Rajasthan, Jaipur.

== Career ==
Sharma with a snake as an ophiologist

Krishan was a postdoctoral researcher at University of Cologne, Germany during (1984–86). He started his teaching career as assistant professor at the University of Rajasthan (1979–1990). He joined as an associate professor at Maharshi Dayanand Saraswati University, Ajmer, and later became a professor in 1995. Later, he served as a Dean, director of the School of Science, and as a vice-chancellor of this university. He has done research on retinoids and limb regeneration, identification of animal species based on sound, and sonotaxonomy. Presently, he spends his time on the advancement of snake awareness to prevent snakebite deaths in rural India.

== Publications ==
Snake awareness program at Jammu

Krishan has published significant research on retinoid and limb regeneration, herpetofauna diversity in the Thar Desert and the central Aravalli Range, and sound-based species identification (sonotaxonomy). After retiring from regular service, he has devoted himself to saving human lives from snake bites through the "Sarp Shiksha Abhiyan" (IPR protected Trade Mark No 6760837, Trade Marks Registry, Government of India). He has more than 50 research publications in peer-reviewed journals.

== Awards and recognition ==
In the 9th World Congress on Alternatives and Animal Use in the Life Sciences (WC9) at Prague, Czech Republic, the International Exchange Committee of the Japanese Society for Alternatives to Animal Experiment (JSAAE) honoured Prof. Sharma with the Best Poster Award for the promotion of Replacement, Reduction, and Refinement (3R) of animal use in scientific research and testing.
