= SmileDirectClub =

Teledentistry company (2014–2023)

SmileDirectClub, LLC
- Company type: Public
- Traded as: OTC Pink: SDCCQ (since 2023); Nasdaq: SDC (2019–2023)
- Industry: Teledentistry
- Founded: 2014
- Founders: Jordan Katzman; Alex Fenkell
- Defunct: December 11, 2023
- Fate: Bankruptcy and liquidation; assets acquired by SmileSet
- Successor: SmileSet
- Headquarters: Nashville, Tennessee, United States
- Revenue: ▲$750 million (2019)
- Number of employees: 6,300
- Website: smiledirectclub.com

SmileDirectClub was an American teledentistry company. The company was co-founded in 2014 by Jordan Katzman and Alex Fenkell. It was based in Nashville, Tennessee, United States. SmileDirectClub was shut down in December 2023 and was liquidated, less than three months after filing for Chapter 11 bankruptcy. The company's assets and technology were later acquired by SmileSet, a company that was established as a successor to SmileDirectClub.

== Products ==
SmileDirectClub produced 3D-printed clear aligners. SmileDirectClub aligners were a competitor of traditional braces and clear alignment companies like Invisalign.

Communication with licensed orthodontic professionals and other SmileDirectClub staff took place virtually. Impression kits were sent to customers, after which teeth molds were reviewed by dentists or orthodontists who oversaw the treatment process. The company reportedly worked with 225 licensed professionals.

While most business and dentistry was conducted online, the company had 300 retail locations across the United States, Canada, Australia and the United Kingdom.

== History ==
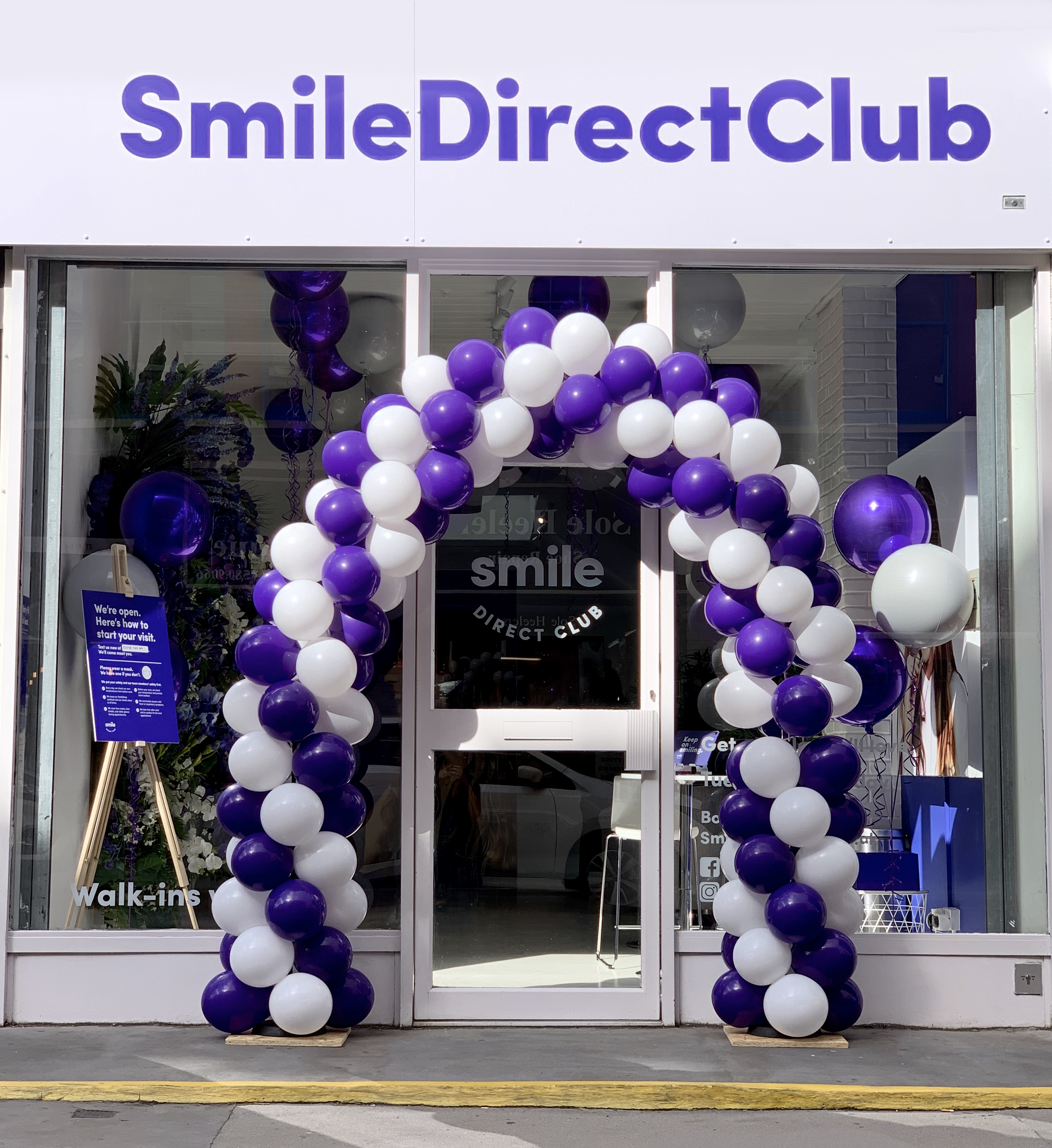
Entrance to a SmileDirectClub SmileShop

The company initially partnered with Align Technology as an exclusive third-party distributor for its aligners. After a dispute over violation of a non-compete clause claiming Align "misused confidential SmileDirectClub information and violated its fiduciary duties," Align was ordered by an arbitrator to close its retail locations and return its ownership stake in SmileDirect. Align filed an additional arbitration to recoup amount the value of the ownership stake. In 2021, the arbitrator ordered SmileDirectClub to pay Align $43.4 million (plus $2.1 million in interest) for the ownership stake.

In October 2018, SmileDirectClub raised $380 million in an investment round led by Clayton, Dubilier & Rice and Kleiner Perkins, for a $3.2 billion valuation according to Bloomberg. SmileDirectClub was initially funded by Camelot Venture Group. NBA player Draymond Green was an early investor in the company, investing in 2015 after personally using its products.

The company expanded into Canada in November 2018, and expanded into the UK and Australia in 2019.

During the 61st Annual Grammy Awards, SmileDirectClub announced a collaboration with singer Shawn Mendes on a campaign to show "that confidence is gained with an amazing smile."

In April 2019, CVS announced that the company would add SmileDirectClub locations to hundreds of CVS stores. In May 2019, HP and SmileDirectClub announced a partnership to produce over 20 million 3D-printed molds over the following year.

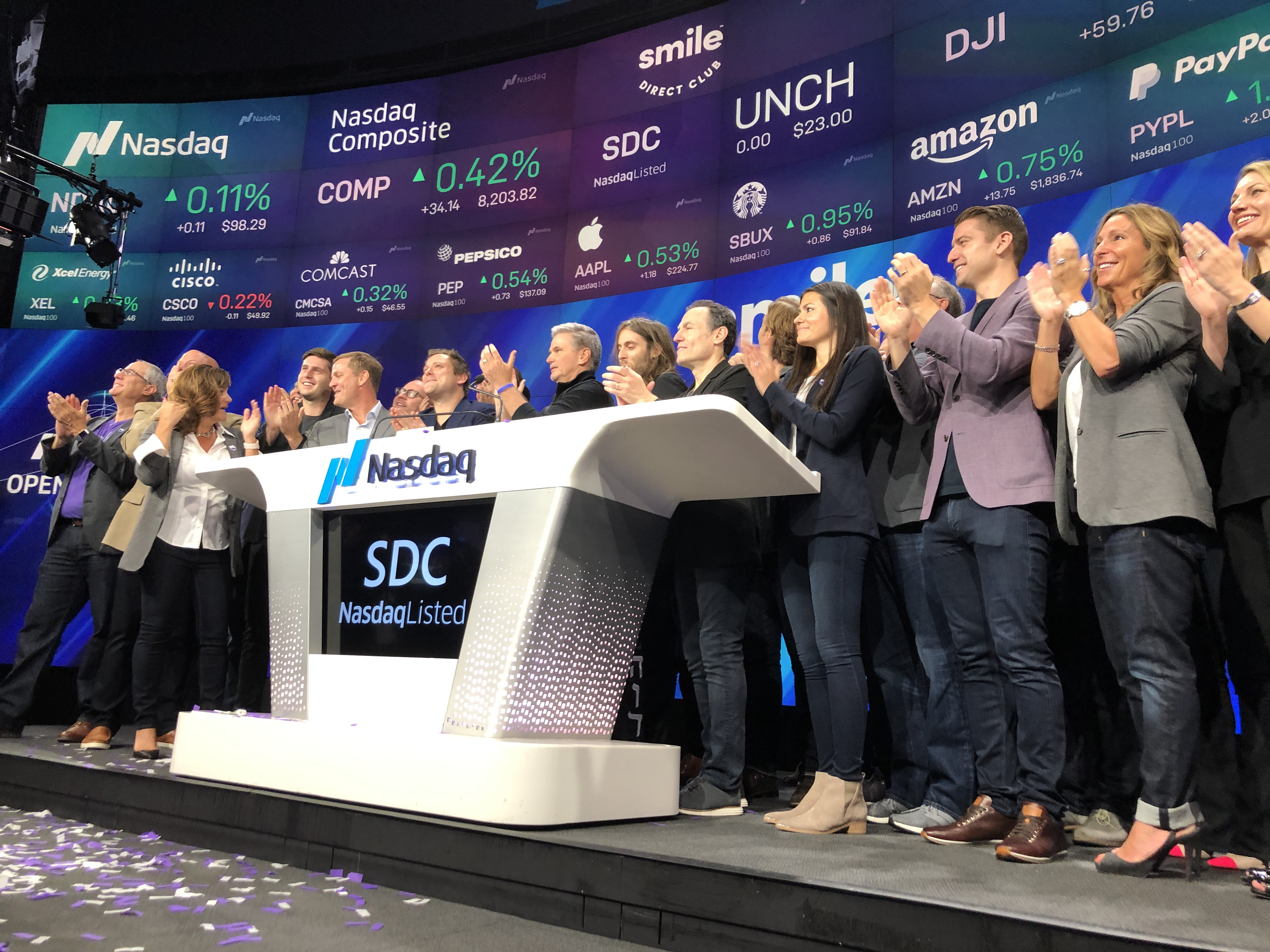
SmileDirectClub celebrating the company's IPO listing on NASDAQ

In August 2019, the company filed S-1 paperwork to go public. On September 12, 2019, the company went public by offering initial shares at $23, above the expected price of $19–22 per share. SDC's IPO opened at $20.55 and closed at $16.67 after the first day, a 28% loss from the initial shares offering. After the loss, the CFO of the company has stated that the focus of the company will remain the same despite market evaluations.

SmileDirectClub was awarded a business model patent on the process used for plastic aligners for customers on April 28, 2020. SmileDirectClub sued a competitor, Candid Care, calling it "a copycat model". U.S. District Judge Colm Connolly invalidated the patent.

On April 14, 2021, the company was the subject of a cyberattack. In a filing, SmileDirectClub reported that they were "able to successfully block the attack, no ransom was paid, and the Company's systems and operations are back online and performing normally." The estimated cost was $10 million to $15 million in revenue "from the cyberattack and the associated downtime in treatment planning and manufacturing."

On August 3, 2021, a workplace shooting occurred at the company's manufacturing facility in Nashville. Two security guards and a manager were injured by the gunman, 22-year-old employee Antonio DeQuan King, who was then shot and killed by responding police officers. SmileDirectClub released a statement after the shooting, saying it was saddened by the events. The assailant was armed with a .45 caliber handgun with an extended magazine, and he fired more than 20 times, and then he was shot five times, including three shots in the legs, one in the arm, and one in the chest.

On September 29, 2023, SmileDirectClub filed for Chapter 11 bankruptcy. During the bankruptcy procedure, the company expected to continue operations normally. However, on December 8, 2023, after a failed last-ditch sale that would help the company to exit bankruptcy, SmileDirectClub announced that it would cease operations, effective immediately and convert their Chapter 11 bankruptcy into a Chapter 7 bankruptcy liquidation. SmileSet, another Nashville based company, later acquired the assets and technology of SmileDirectClub, incorporating their innovative patents and manufacturing systems into the company. SmileDirectClub converted their Chapter 11 case into Chapter 7 on January 26, 2024.

== Criticisms ==
The American Association of Orthodontists (AAO) has filed complaints with 36 state dental boards, alleging that SmileDirectClub violates regulatory standards. According to SmileDirectClub representatives, 12 of the cases have been closed and no adverse legal action has been taken against the company. The AAO has stated that only five states confirmed closed cases.

In September 2019, a group of customers filed a class-action lawsuit against the company, claiming SmileDirectClub engaged in false advertising and violating FDA regulations. Due to a clause in SmileDirectClub's consent forms that require disputes to be resolved via arbitration, all but two plaintiffs in the lawsuit withdrew.

In January 2020, the New York Times published an article revealing SmileDirectClub's usage of non-disclosure agreements worked to limit information about customers' dissatisfaction with its products, including medical concerns. The company sued Lifehacker's parent company for defamation and libel after the site published an article outlining the risks of its products. It also sued state dental boards after making it harder for SmileDirectClub to operate. SmileDirectClub's chief legal officer defended the company's actions, stating, "When we believe that there is an organized campaign to damage our reputation amongst consumers, dentists, or investors, we will defend ourselves and our mission to democratize access to care every chance we get."

In March 2020, CBC News's Marketplace released an investigative report where they found the company had made misleading claims about their aligners and gave questionable treatment plans. Marketplace sent four potential customers wearing hidden cameras to SmileDirectClub locations in the Toronto area. While SmileDirectClub approved all four patients for treatment plans, orthodontists asked to review the treatment plan and said that none should have been approved. In one case, the orthodontist said the proposed treatment plan could increase the likelihood of chips and wear. SmileDirectClub disputed this assessment and stated that the treatment plans would all result in an improved smile appearance. Following the investigative, SmileDirectClub released a list of changes that they were making to the company, including increased training, changes to their forms so customers better understand they need to visit a dentist six months before starting treatment, and making the contact information for treating doctor available as soon as they are approved for treatment.

SmileDirectClub filed a $2.8 billion lawsuit against NBC News in May 2020, accusing the news organization of broadcasting a story with errors. The NBC Nightly News story cited patients who complained of pain after receiving SmileDirectClub's treatment. One patient featured in the report said her orthodontist diagnosed her with a crossbite "possibly caused by" the company's aligners. Another patient gave testimony that his dentist said SmileDirectClub's aligners "moved his teeth so fast that it caused some of them to detach from the bone." SmileDirectClub's lawsuit claims the story contained more than 40 false and misleading statements. An NBC News spokesperson responded in a statement about the case, "We stand by our reporting and believe this is a meritless claim." In December 2021, the lawsuit was dismissed after a court ruled SmileDirectClub failed to meet its burden under the Tennessee Public Participation Act, the state's anti-SLAPP law.
