= Georgia School of Orthodontics =

- Atlanta, Georgia

Information
- Established: 2016
- School board: Dr. Ricky Harrell (Program Director); Dr. John Stockstill (Director of Research); Dr. Randy Kluender (President & Chairman)
- Website: bracestoday.com

Georgia School of Orthodontics (GSO) is an orthodontic school located in Atlanta, Georgia, United States. It was established in 2016 and offers a 36 month Advanced Specialty Education Program in Orthodontics & Dentofacial Orthopedics. In response to GSO's growth, the school opened another location in Georgia in 2017.

== History ==
GSO was founded in 2016 and is accredited by the Commission on Dental Accreditation. At its opening, the school was approved to enroll 18 students per class. In 2020, the school enrolled 36 residents per class. GSO has become the nation's largest orthodontic residency program.

GSO opened its Sandy Springs clinic in 2016, with a focus on providing braces and Invisalign to patients at close to half the cost of private orthodontists.

== Academics ==
The 36 month Residency Program consists of didactic, clinical, and research components that are taught using advanced technology and material.

As a part of the curriculum, the orthodontic residents review current orthodontics-related research literature. At the conclusion of their coursework, residents are required to complete the American Board of Orthodontist's written examination during the second year of their residency program.

== Philanthropy ==
GSO created its Gift of a Smile program in 2016 to commemorate its grand opening. The program pledged to give $100,000 of complimentary orthodontic treatment to children in the Atlanta area. As of late 2020, over 20 children in the Atlanta area have received complimentary orthodontic care through the program.

GSO has invested over $100,000 into complimentary orthodontic care for Purple Heart recipients' children, and is expanding per year. GSO launched its Gift of a Smile Heroes initiative in 2021.

GSO is the creator of the Books & Braces gift card giveaway, where two teachers who receive the most votes in Gwinnett County win a $200 gift card to use toward school supplies for their classrooms.

== Campuses ==
GSO offers two locations in Georgia. The main campus is in Atlanta, with the other location in Duluth. Each location offers dental residents hands-on training, working directly with patients in a clinical setting.

The Gwinnett campus is over 9,000 square feet and includes classrooms, research areas, and faculty offices.
