= Intraoral camera =

Device used to take photos of the inside of a patient's mouth

An intraoral camera is a small imaging device designed to capture detailed images of the oral cavity, aiding in diagnosis and treatment planning. It is an essential tool for documenting before-and-after images of dental procedures and maintaining accurate patient dental records. This device allows dentists to share real-time visuals of a patient's oral condition on a computer screen, as the camera, located at the tip of the intraoral wand, transmits live video footage. By providing patients with clear visuals of their oral health condition, the intraoral camera helps them better understand the need for the recommended treatments by their dentists. Overall, it enhances patient communication and education while serving as a valuable tool for documentation and clinical review.

== How does it Work? ==
The device includes a tiny digital camera paired with LED lights. The LEDs illuminate the area, ensuring clear and focused imaging. Advanced models allow magnification up to 100x for intricate details. The camera is placed inside the mouth, capturing images of the teeth and gums. Rotatable camera heads, up to 90 degrees provide flexibility, helping dentists view hard-to-reach areas. The images are transmitted in real time to a connected monitor. This allows both the dentist and the patient to see what is being examined, improving communication and understanding of oral health issues. The captured images can be saved digitally, integrated into the patient's medical records, or shared for further consultation. This facilitates accurate tracking of dental conditions over time. The visual evidence supports clear diagnosis, treatment planning, and discussions with patients. It also aids in submitting claims to insurance providers by offering visual proof of conditions.

== When is it Used? ==
The intraoral camera is a versatile tool that plays a crucial role in modern dentistry by enhancing diagnosis, treatment planning, and patient communication. Its compact size allows it to navigate and capture detailed images of hard-to-reach areas within the oral cavity, revealing hidden problems such as early-stage cavities, fractures, or periodontal issues that might not be easily visible during a standard visual examination. By providing high-resolution images in real-time, it eliminates diagnostic uncertainty, enabling precise treatment planning tailored to the patient's needs. Applications of intraoral cameras can be categorised into direct clinical uses before, during and after treatment, as well as indirect remote uses such as diagnosing, monitoring, and preventive maintenance.

In regards to operative dentistry, intra oral cameras can be used to diagnose cavities and decay. Intraoral cameras enable dentists to detect cavities at their earliest stages, even before they become visible to the naked eye or show up on X-rays. This early detection allows for less invasive treatments, such as small fillings, which can prevent the need for more extensive procedures like root canals or crowns. These cameras can capture intricate details of the tooth surfaces, identifying microfractures, pits, and fissures where decay might start. This level of detail is crucial for accurate diagnosis and effective treatment planning.

For instance in orthodontics, the intraoral camera is instrumental in monitoring progress, capturing subtle changes over time, and ensuring the treatment is on track. Additionally, it is valuable in patient education, allowing individuals to view their oral conditions firsthand, fostering a deeper understanding and more informed decisions regarding their care. The images can also be stored for future reference or shared with specialists, ensuring more reliable dental records and enhancing collaborative treatment approaches. Its use supports preventive dentistry by helping to detect issues early, ultimately contributing to improved oral health outcomes.

Intraoral cameras also play a role in cosmetic dentistry. Patients can be shown a visual of what can be done to modify their smiles with various cosmetic dental procedures like veneers or dental implants.

These cameras can also be used for endodontic cases as well. Intraoral cameras assist in diagnosing and planning root canal treatments by providing details images of the tooth structure and extent of the infection or damage. This precision helps in ensuring that the entire root canal system is thoroughly cleaned and sealed. Post treatment monitoring can too be done to monitor healing and detect any potential complications early.

== Types of Intraoral Camera ==
Intraoral cameras are essential tools in modern dentistry, enabling better visualization of the oral cavity to enhance diagnosis, treatment, and patient education. Over the years, the technology behind these cameras has evolved, giving rise to various types that cater to different clinical needs. While the fundamental function of these cameras is to capture detailed images of the mouth, different types of intraoral cameras vary in their features, applications, and technological sophistication. The variety of intraoral cameras can be classified based on factors such as image quality, connectivity, and additional technologies integrated into the devices.

=== Intraoral Wand Camera ===
An intraoral wand camera is a compact, handheld device specifically designed for capturing real-time images or videos inside the patient's mouth (see Figure 1).

The wand-like shape of most intraoral cameras makes them lightweight and ergonomic, reducing hand strain during prolonged use. Most intraoral cameras are portable and compact, allowing for easy handling and maneuverability inside the patient's mouth, especially in hard-to-reach areas like the back molars and gum lines. Their ergonomic design ensures that dental professionals can capture images efficiently, without causing discomfort to the patient or requiring complex movements

Modern intraoral cameras are designed to seamlessly integrate with dental management systems and other tools, allowing for efficient workflow and enhanced patient care. Many models use USB ports for easy connection to computers, while Wireless models are available for greater flexibility and freedom of movement. This allows for direct image transfer to the dentist's computer or a cloud-based system. Some intraoral cameras have cloud storage integration, allowing images and patient data to be stored securely and accessed remotely. This is particularly useful in teledentistry, enabling dentists to consult with patients and colleagues from a distance.

Some advanced intraoral cameras are equipped with 3D scanning technology, allowing them to create three-dimensional models of the oral cavity (see Figure 2). These cameras capture digital impressions of the teeth and gums in 3D, providing a comprehensive view of the patient's mouth. These detailed images are critical in procedures such as restorations, crowns, and orthodontic treatment planning. 3D intraoral cameras can be integrated with CAD/CAM systems, which allow for the design of restorations like crowns, bridges, and dentures. This integration ensures greater accuracy in treatment planning and the creation of dental prosthetics.

The integration of artificial intelligence (AI) into intraoral cameras is a cutting-edge development that offers dentists enhanced diagnostic capabilities. AI-enhanced cameras can analyze captured images and automatically detect dental issues such as caries, cracks, and gum disease. The AI system highlights areas of concern, making it easier for the dentist to make quick and accurate decisions. AI tools improve diagnostic efficiency by offering real-time insights, which may help identify issues that could be missed during a manual examination.

The image resolution offered by intraoral cameras can vary significantly, with more advanced models offering higher-quality imaging that is critical for diagnosing dental issues with precision. Many intraoral cameras feature HD or higher resolutions (1080p or more), which provide clear, sharp images that are necessary for identifying issues such as cavities, cracks, and plaque. Some cameras come with autofocus technology, which automatically adjusts the lens to ensure that images are captured at the highest clarity. Zoom features allow dentists to focus on smaller areas of concern, such as fissures or minute dental cracks

In addition to capturing still images, many intraoral cameras are capable of real-time video recording. This feature allows dentists to show patients ongoing procedures or provide dynamic images of dental conditions.

=== Single Reflex Lens (SRL) Dental Intraoral Camera ===
The SLR (Single-Lens Reflex) intraoral camera is a cutting-edge dental imaging tool that captures high-quality photographs of the oral cavity, revolutionizing diagnostics, treatment planning, and patient communication. Equipped with high-resolution sensors, often exceeding 20 megapixels, these cameras provide detailed images that highlight enamel cracks, early carious lesions, and soft tissue abnormalities, enhancing diagnostic accuracy. Advanced sensors like CMOS and CCD ensure superior image clarity compared to standard intraoral cameras.

A key feature of SLR intraoral cameras is their interchangeable lens system, allowing dentists to switch lenses for macro close-ups or other specialized views, offering flexibility for comprehensive documentation. Manual control over settings such as aperture, shutter speed, and ISO enables customized imaging based on lighting conditions, ensuring optimal exposure and eliminating shadows.

Integrated ring lights or external flashes ensure uniform illumination, reducing shadows and enhancing image clarity. LED-based ring flashes are particularly effective. Many models also feature wireless connectivity for seamless transfer of images to computers or cloud systems, streamlining workflow and patient record management.

SLR intraoral cameras are ergonomically designed to be lightweight and compact, minimizing user fatigue and allowing easy maneuvering in tight spaces. Their durable construction ensures they withstand daily clinical use, making them a reliable and cost-effective option for dental practices.

These cameras are invaluable for diagnostic imaging, creating detailed treatment plans, and enhancing patient understanding through visual evidence of conditions and treatment progress. They are also essential for insurance claims, referrals, and legal documentation. Compared to conventional intraoral cameras, SLR models offer higher resolution, interchangeable lenses, advanced lighting systems, wireless capabilities, and greater durability.

Future advancements are expected to integrate artificial intelligence (AI) and augmented reality (AR), enabling automated diagnostics and real-time overlays, further improving their utility.

== See also ==
- IOC (disambiguation)
- Otoscope
- Digital dentistry
- Dental instrument
