= Clear aligners =

Transparent dental braces

Clear Aligner
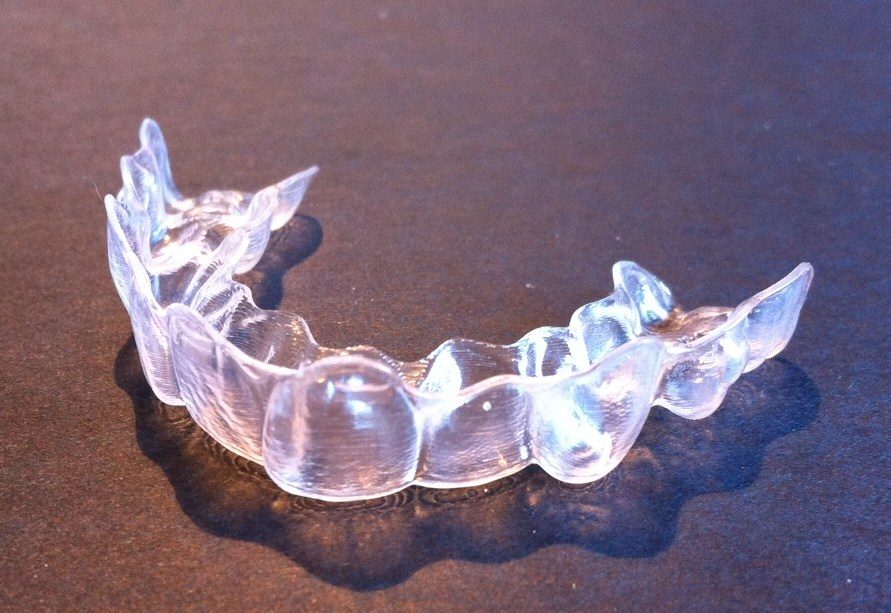
- An Invisalign aligner

Clear aligners are orthodontic devices that are a transparent, plastic form of dental braces used to adjust teeth.

Clear aligners have undergone changes, making assessment of effectiveness difficult. A 2014 systematic review concluded that published studies were of insufficient quality to determine effectiveness. Experience suggests they are effective for moderate crowding of the front teeth, but less effective than conventional braces for several other issues (Note: Daniel A. Kuncio (The New York State Dental Journal), 2014: "Invisalign has been proven to resolve moderate anterior tooth crowding predictably, but treatment outcome studies have highlighted Invisalign's weaknesses compared to conventional braces in treating anterior-posterior discrepancies, large rotational movements and the extrusion of teeth. More post-treatment relapse of anterior dental alignment has also been found in Invisalign cases.") and are not recommended for children. In particular they are indicated for "mild to moderate crowding (1–6 mm) and mild to moderate spacing (1–6 mm)", in cases where there are no discrepancies of the jawbone. They are also indicated for patients who have experienced a relapse after fixed orthodontic treatment.

Clear-aligner treatment involves an orthodontist or dentist, or with home-based systems, the person themselves, taking a mold of the patient's teeth, which is used to create a digital tooth scan. The computerized model suggests stages between the current and desired teeth positions, and aligners are created for each stage. Each aligner is worn for 22 hours a day for one or two weeks. These slowly move the teeth into the position agreed between the orthodontist or dentist and the patient. The average treatment time is 13.5 months. Despite patent infringement litigation, no manufacturer has obtained an injunction against another manufacturer.

== Uses ==
A 2014 systematic review concluded that there is insufficient evidence to determine the effectiveness of these clear aligners. The general opinion is that they are likely useful for moderate front-teeth crowding. In those with teeth that are too far forward or backward, or rotated in the socket, the aligners are likely not as effective as conventional braces. More cases of relapse of the anterior teeth have been found with clear aligners compared with conventional braces. A 2013 Cochrane review found no high-quality evidence with respect to the management of the recurrence of lower-front-teeth misalignment following treatment.

Clear aligners are more noticeable than lingual braces, but they can be removed, which makes cleaning of the teeth easier, and they are faster for the dentist to apply.

=== Application ===
3D representation of a person's teeth in the Invisalign software

Treatment begins with taking x-ray and photographs for diagnostic purposes, followed by capturing the patient's bite, teeth, and gums via a bite registration and polyvinyl siloxane impressions or an intra-oral digital scanner. The latter method has greatly increased in popularity in recent years as digital scanning technology has improved. The dentist/orthodontist completes a written evaluation that includes diagnosis and treatment plan. Dental impressions are scanned in order to create a digital 3D representation of the teeth. Technicians move the teeth to the desired location with the program Treat, which creates the stages between the current and desired teeth positions. Anywhere from six to eighty aligners may be needed during the first set of aligners. Each aligner moves teeth .25 to .33 millimeters. Additional and subsequent rounds of aligners, known as "Refinements", may be necessary to achieve desired tooth positions as clear aligners do not always achieve full movement in the first round.

A computer graphic representation of the projected teeth movements, created in the software program ClinCheck, is provided to the doctor and patient for approval or modification before aligners are manufactured. The aligners are modeled using CAD/CAM (computer-aided-design and computer-aided-manufacturing) software and manufactured using a rapid prototyping technique called stereolithography. The molds for the aligners are built in layers using a photo-sensitive liquid resin that cures into a hard plastic when exposed to a laser. The aligners are made from an elastic thermoplastic material that applies pressure to the teeth to move into the aligner's position. Patients that need a tooth rotated or pulled down may have a small, tooth-colored composite attachment bonded onto certain teeth. Since the form-fitted plastic used in clear aligners is not as rigid as the metal used in traditional braces, sometimes the flexibility in the materials need to be compensated in the areas that require movement. Alternatively, attachments may be used to facilitate movement by changing the shape of the tooth. More attachments can make the aligners less aesthetically pleasing. Interproximal reduction (IPR, also called reproximation or, colloquially, filing or drilling) is sometimes used at the contacts between teeth to allow for a better fit.

Each aligner is intended to be worn an optimal 22 hours a day for one to two weeks. On average the treatment process takes 13.5 months, although treatment time varies based on the complexity of the planned teeth movements. The aligner is removed for brushing, flossing and eating. As clear aligners are made from plastic, they can be warped by hot liquids. While undergoing treatment one should limit their intake of hot liquids to protect the shape of the aligners and stop them from becoming stained. Once the treatment period has concluded, the patient is advised to continue wearing a retainer at night for the foreseeable future.

When the Invisalign system was first developed, many of the aligner manufacturing processes were carried out by hand, and computer technicians had to modify each tooth in the computerized model individually.

== Brands ==
=== Invisalign ===
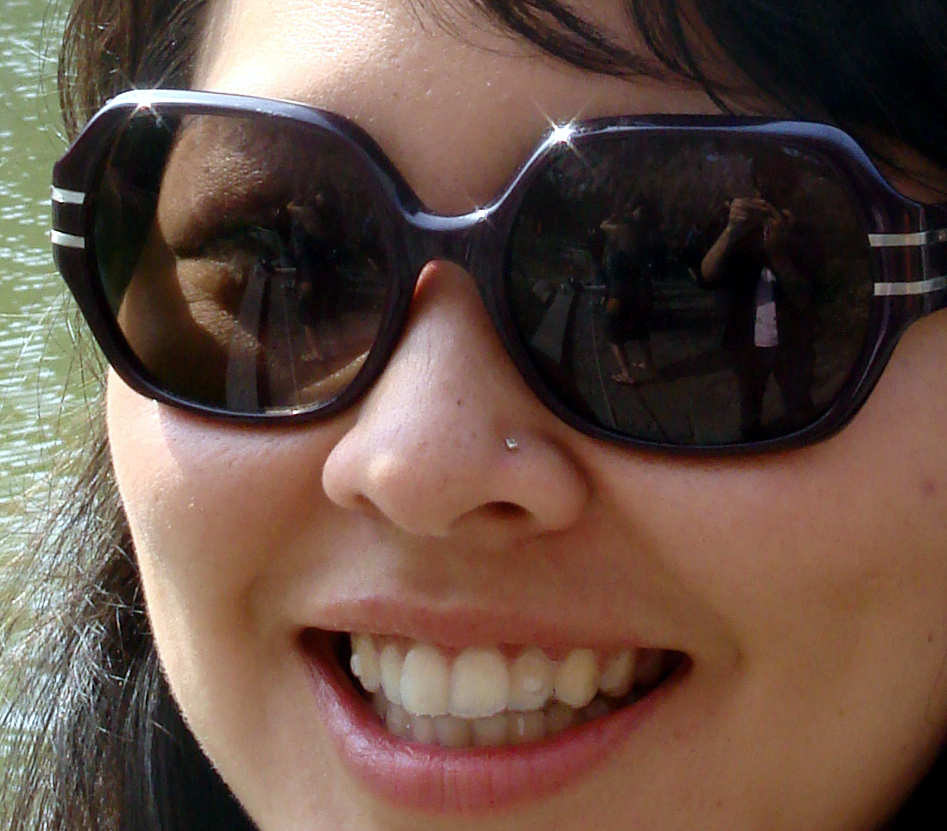
Woman wearing an Invisalign clear aligner

Invisalign is manufactured by Align Technology, an American multinational medical-device company. The company's clear align system has been used to treat more than 12.2 million patients.

The company was founded in 1997 by Zia Chishti. Chishti conceived of the basic design of InvisAlign while an adult orthodontics patient. During his treatment with a retainer intended to complete his treatment, he posited that a series of such devices could effect a large final placement in a series of small movements.

Sales began in the U.S. in 1999.

Orthodontists were resistant to adopting Invisalign at first, in particular because the founders had no orthodontic credentials or expertise, but the product became popular among consumers. As of 2014, 80,000 dentists had been trained how to use it.

=== Orthoclear ===
Zia Chishti was ousted from Align Technology in 2002. In 2005 he developed Orthoclear, a similar product, which resulted in several legal disputes involving allegations of patent infringement, false advertising, defamation and trademark infringement. The case was settled in 2006. Align paid OrthoClear $20 million and OrthoClear agreed to end its operations.

=== ClearCorrect ===
ClearCorrect, LLC, based in Round Rock, Texas, was established in 2006. The company distributes its product throughout the United States, and in 2011 was named the fastest-growing health company in America by Inc. magazine. It has been reported that in 2017 its clear align system had been used to treat about 80,000 patients.

ClearCorrect was founded in Houston, Texas, by Willis Pumphrey, Jr., a dentist. In 2001, Pumphrey started using Invisalign. He decided to switch to OrthoClear, because of the way OrthoClear manufactured its aligners and because of its reduced lab fees. When manufacture of Orthoclear ceased, Pumphrey had 400 patients in treatment. With no other options available, he started his own company to complete his patients' clear aligner treatment.

In 2017, ClearCorrect was acquired by Swiss company Straumann.

== Direct-to-consumer brands ==
=== SmileDirectClub ===
SmileDirectClub, based in Nashville, Tennessee, was launched in 2014 as an alternative to in-office clear aligners. The company offered direct-to-consumer clear aligner service which can be used from home, without having to see a dentist. This allowed them to price aligners at half of the other competitors. Unlike Invisalign or traditional clear aligners competitors, no brackets were placed on patient's teeth in office and the teeth were expected to move via the plastic aligner alone. The company faced criticism from the orthodontic community because of no involvement of a physical dentist. Similar startups have also launched in different parts of the world. In September 2023, SmileDirectClub filed for bankruptcy, before shutting down completely in December 2023, leaving thousands of customers without any support.

=== Smile White ===
Smile White is a UK-based company that offers clear aligners. In June 2023, the brand was acquired by dentists Hussein and Hassan Dalghous, known on TikTok as TwinDentists.

=== Direct to consumer clear aligner services ===
Following SmileDirectClub, multiple companies provide aligner treatment to patients by mailing their aligners and monitoring the treatment through a digital platform. The American Association of Orthodontists, the largest society representing orthodontists in the United States and abroad, released consumer alert explaining potential risks associated with such services.

== Litigation ==
=== Lawsuits ===
The litigious history in the clear aligner market prompted ClearCorrect to be proactive in addressing patent issues between itself and Align Technology. Align had previously filed a complaint with the U.S. International Trade Commission against OrthoClear Inc. In the end an agreement was made between Align and OrthoClear in which Align paid OrthoClear $20 million for its intellectual property and OrthoClear agreed to stop accepting cases in the United States.

In 2009, Align Technology began to require that doctors prescribing Invisalign complete at least ten cases per year and ten hours of training in order to maintain their Invisalign provider status. In January 2010, 20,000 doctors had their certification suspended for not meeting the requirements, but a class action lawsuit regarding providers that paid for training under the original rules resulted in some certifications being re-instated.

In February 2009, ClearCorrect filed a declaratory judgment against Align Technology. ClearCorrect claimed that some of Align's patents were invalid, and thus ClearCorrect's product did not infringe on Align's patents. ClearCorrect voluntarily dismissed the suit in April 2009, after Align stated to the court that it had no intention of suing ClearCorrect for patent infringement.

On February 28, 2011, Align Technology filed two lawsuits against ClearCorrect. Align alleged that under California's Unfair Practices Act, that ClearCorrect sold products for a price below the average production cost, with the purpose of "destroying competition in the market for clear aligner systems". Align also claimed that ClearCorrect infringed eight of Align's patents.

On May 12, 2011, ClearCorrect filed a countersuit against Align Technology, denying allegations that it is infringing on Align patents. In the countersuit, ClearCorrect alleged that Align's allegations are invalid and accused Align of patent misuse and double patenting. The countersuit cited much of the evidence raised in Align's previous patent case against Ormco, which resulted in a federal court ruling that 11 of Align's patent claims were invalid.

In September 2023, SmileDirectClub filed for bankruptcy. While SmileDirectClub initially sought Chapter 11 bankruptcy protection to restructure its finances, it was unable to secure the necessary funding and ultimately shut down its operations in December 2023.

In October 2024, Dentsply Sirona voluntarily suspended the sale and marketing of its Byte clear aligners and impression kits as it conducts a review of regulatory requirements.

== Costs ==
The cost of clear aligners is typically lower than their all-metal counterparts because of the materials and technology used. Prices are rarely impacted by factors such as the duration of the treatment and the extent of the issues requiring correction, as much as specific details of the treatment plan, time/age of treatment, location, the experience of the orthodontist. In countries such as Australia, Canada, United States and United Kingdom prices are fairly similar across providers at circa $2,000/£1,500.
