= Afiniti =

American software and data company

- Type: Private
- Industry: Software development
- Genre: Artificial intelligence
- Founded: 2005 in Washington, D.C., United States
- Founders: Zia Chishti
- Headquarters: Hamilton, Bermuda
- Area served: Worldwide
- Key people: Jerome Kapelus (CEO)
- Number of employees: 1,300 (2021)
- Website: afiniti.com

Afiniti is a multinational company specializing in artificial intelligence applications for customer experience optimization in contact centers, founded in 2005. The company develops technologies that use machine learning to match customers with call center agents, with applications in sectors including telecommunications, financial services, healthcare, and insurance.

== History ==
=== 2006–2010: Early history ===
In 2006, Afiniti was founded in Washington, D.C. by Zia Chishti, a former Morgan Stanley investment banker who had previously co-founded Align Technology, with the help of his partners at The Resource Group (TRG), Hasnain Aslam and Mohammed Khaishgi of the Kheshgi family. In 2008, the company submitted several patents related to matching caller data with computer models, which were granted in 2014.

=== 2011–2020: Growth period ===
In late 2016, the company confidentially filed for a potential future initial public offering (IPO). Around that time, Afiniti also introduced software to run phone numbers "through a variety of databases prior to when a call center agent picks up the phone." The system referred to around 100 databases to gather information on callers, including from public profiles such as Twitter. According to Fortune magazine, the system operated on "the idea that it's possible, using thousands of call records, to determine which agents perform best with certain type of customers."

According to The Wall Street Journal, by January 2017, the company had installed its artificial intelligence software in around 150 call centers for several dozen companies, among them Caesars Entertainment Corporation and Sprint. In 2017, the company closed a fourth round of venture funding, bringing in $80 million from investors such as GAM, McKinsey & Co, Elisabeth Murdoch, and John Browne. The round brought the company's total funding raised since its inception to $100 million. Afiniti signed a deal with Huawei in September 2017 and Avaya in April 2018.

In January 2018, Fortune magazine included Afiniti on its list of the 100 companies "leading the way in A.I." By June 2018, Afiniti had been active in 18 countries and had 1,000 employees.

=== 2021–2024: Resignation of Zia Chishti and bankruptcy ===
In November 2021, Zia Chishti stepped down as chairman, chief executive officer and director following allegations of sexual assault to an employee made in testimony to the United States House Committee on the Judiciary. The former UK prime minister David Cameron left his role as chair of Afiniti's advisory board following the allegations. The board appointed Larry Babbio as interim CEO to lead the company through the transition.

On September 27, 2023, the board named Hassan Afzal as CEO, succeeding Babbio, citing Afzal's experience in scaling technology businesses and his prior role as an Afiniti board member since 2021.

Facing mounting financial pressures, including over $580 million in liabilities, Afiniti entered restructuring proceedings in September 2024, securing a support agreement with 100% of its secured lenders and initiating provisional liquidation in Bermuda for debt reorganization and asset transfer to a new entity.

=== 2025–present: Post restructuring ===
On February 10, 2025, Jerome Kapelus was appointed CEO, replacing Afzal, who transitioned to a strategic advisory role.

== Leadership and Advisory Board ==
Afiniti hired a number of individuals from prominent political and business families, including Princess Beatrice, Prince Harry's friend Tom Inskip and Winston Churchill's great grandson in the UK, Wyatt Roy in Australia, a nephew of Lee Kuan Yew in Singapore, the son of former Spanish Prime Minister José María Aznar in Spain, the son of French business leader Henri de Castries in France and the daughter of banker António Horta-Osório in the US.

Afiniti also maintained a Senior Advisory Board, which the Telegraph described as resembling "the annual guest list of the Bilderberg Meeting".

Members included political figures such as former UK Prime Minister David Cameron, former French Prime Minister François Fillon, former U.S. Treasury Secretary John W. Snow, and former Australian Foreign Minister Julie Bishop.

It also included former CEOs from major global corporations, such as Thomson Reuters' Tom Glocer, BP’s John Browne, Sony’s Nobuyuki Idei, Unicredit’s Federico Ghizzoni, Air France's Alexandre de Juniac, and Hutchison Whampoa’s Simon Murray.

== Services and technology ==
According to Afiniti, its software uses AI to improve call center efficiency by "predicting interpersonal behavior" between the callers and agents. VentureBeat explains that "when a customer calls into a call center, Afiniti matches their phone number — either landline or cellphone — with any information tied to it from up to 100 databases. These databases carry purchase history, income, and other demographic information." Data on customers is collected from the customers and from data brokers. Afiniti does not charge for the software or service itself, but instead takes a percentage of any proven revenue increases resulting from use of the software.
