= TRG Pakistan =

Pakistani venture capital firm

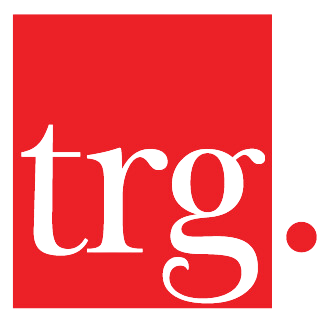
- Type: Public
- Traded as: PSX: TRG; KSE 100 component
- Industry: Venture capital
- Founded: 2003; 23 years ago
- Founder: Hasnain Aslam; Zia Chishti; Mohammed Khaishgi
- Headquarters: Karachi, Pakistan
- Key people: Mohammed Khaishgi (Chairman); Hasnain Aslam (CEO)
- Net income: ▲ Rs. 4.647 billion (US$17 million) (2025)
- Total assets: ▲ Rs. 46.688 billion (US$170 million) (2025)
- Total equity: ▲ Rs. 33.286 billion (US$120 million) (2025)
- Owner: Greentree Holdings (28.54%) Js bank (29.33%)
- Number of employees: 6 (2025)
- Subsidiaries: TRG International Limited (45.3%)
- Website: trg.com.pk
- Footnotes; Financials as of 30 June 2025

TRG Pakistan Limited, originally The Resource Group, is a Pakistani venture capital and investment holding company that specialises in investments in business process outsourcing, technology, and telecommunications companies. It is based in Karachi.

== History ==
TRG was founded in 2003 by Hasnain Aslam, Zia Chishti, Mohammed Khaishgi, following Chishti's departure from Align Technology, the Invisalign manufacturer he had co-founded. The company's initial operations were built around the former Pakistani back-office of Align Technology in Lahore, which became the basis for a planned call center platform.

In July 2003, TRG was listed on the Karachi Stock Exchange following an initial public offering at a strike price of PKR 10 per share. In November 2003, TRG acquired a 40 percent stake in Centratel LLC, a provider of call center and telephone answering services in Bend, Oregon. Previously, it made an investment in Los Angeles–based Alert Communications.

In May 2004, TRG acquired iSKY Inc., a company providing customer care and marketing services provider with operations in North America and Europe. The following month, TRG's subsidiary Alert Communications acquired DCS Inc., a South Dakota–based call center operator. In 2005, TRG made a seed investment in Afiniti, a Washington, D.C.-based software firm developing artificial intelligence for use in customer contact centers.

In October 2007, TRG sold its shareholding in Central Voice, LLC to Endicott Communications for $1.75 million. By the 2010s, TRG had reorganised itself as an investment holding company with its assets held through TRG International Limited, an offshore vehicle whose principal portfolio companies included Afiniti, Ibex, and eTelequote.

In 2020, TRG's portfolio company ibex was listed on the Nasdaq.

In November 2021, co-founder Zia Chishti resigned from his roles at Afiniti following allegations of sexual misconduct made in testimony to the United States House Committee on the Judiciary, and later that month stepped down from all positions at TRG and its affiliates. In December 2021, the boards of TRG Pakistan and TRG International appointed Mohammed Khaishgi as chief executive of TRG International and Hasnain Aslam as chief executive of TRG Pakistan; both had managed substantial portions of the operating portfolio since 2016.

On May 21, 2026, JS Bank executed the enforcement of a security pledge to acquire an additional 14.92% stake for PKR 5.1 billion, raising its consolidated group holding alongside concert parties to a dominant 29.33%. This places the JS Group as one of the single largest voting blocks.

== Operations ==
TRG Pakistan operates as an investment holding company whose principal asset is a non-controlling stake of approximately 45.3 percent in TRG International Limited, a Bermuda-incorporated vehicle that in turn holds equity positions in TRG's operating portfolio.

As of 2026, TRG's two principal operating assets are Ibex, a Nasdaq-listed BPO and customer experience technology firm headquartered in Washington, D.C. (held at approximately 28.8 percent through TRG International), and Afiniti, a privately held artificial-intelligence software firm focused on contact-center optimisation (held at approximately 17.2 percent through TRG International).

== Legal issues ==
In June 2025, the Sindh High Court delivered a 52-page judgment in J.C.M. No. 12 of 2025, holding that the affairs of TRG Pakistan Limited had been conducted in a manner that was "unlawful, fraudulent and oppressive". The court found that Greentree Holdings had acquired nearly 30 percent of TRG Pakistan's shares using funds originating from TRG Pakistan, in violation of Section 86(2) of the Companies Act, 2017. The court also ruled that Greentree's proposed tender offer for additional shares was unlawful, declared Greentree's shareholding invalid, and ordered immediate board elections.

In May 2026, the Supreme Court of Pakistan dismissed appeals filed by Greentree Holdings Limited, The Resource Group International Limited, and TRG Pakistan Limited against the Sindh High Court judgment. In a short order, the Supreme Court granted leave to appeal, converted the petitions into appeals, and dismissed them, thereby leaving the Sindh High Court's rulings in place pending the issuance of detailed reasons.
