= Orthoclear =

- Industry: Orthodontics
- Founded: 2005
- Founder: Zia Chishti
- Headquarters: Dublin, Ireland (CC Lab Technology Limited); Berlin, Germany (Smile Aid GmbH)
- Area served: Europe
- Products: Clear aligners
- Website: https://ortho-clear.com

Orthoclear is a brand of clear aligners designed for cosmetic teeth straightening in adults. It was originally launched in the United States in 2005 by Zia Chishti, the inventor of Invisalign. Since 2018, the brand name has been reintroduced in Europe, registered by CC Lab Technology Limited (based in Dublin, Ireland) and commercially operated by Smile Aid GmbH (based in Berlin, Germany).

== History ==
=== United States (2005–2006) ===
Orthoclear was founded in 2005 by Zia Chishti, co-founder of Align Technology, the company behind Invisalign. The company positioned itself as a more affordable and user-friendly alternative to Invisalign and quickly gained over 3,000 orthodontist partners.

In May 2006, Align Technology filed a complaint against Orthoclear with the U.S. International Trade Commission (ITC), alleging patent infringement and misuse of proprietary information. Orthoclear filed a counterclaim alleging abuse of market dominance.

A settlement was reached in October 2006: Align paid $20 million, acquired Orthoclear's intellectual property, and Orthoclear ceased its global operations. The consent order was officially filed with the ITC.

In a 2017 article, Forbes confirmed that Align's $20 million acquisition of Orthoclear's IP helped it remove a major competitor from the market.

=== Europe (2018–present) ===
In 2018, the Orthoclear brand was re-registered in the European Union by CC Lab Technology Limited (EUIPO TM017991755). A second registration followed in 2020 for broader product categories (TM018403135).

Smile Aid GmbH, based in Berlin, manages the commercial rollout through a direct-to-consumer platform. According to its privacy policy, data is jointly processed by CC Lab, Smile Aid GmbH, and Clear Technology Inc. Aligners are manufactured in Germany and Ireland, with treatment planning outsourced to a U.S. partner.

== Products and positioning ==
Orthoclear offers custom-made aligners for aesthetic teeth alignment, aimed at mild to moderate corrections. Patients begin with a 3D scan at a local practice, followed by a digital treatment plan and home delivery. The treatment uses no attachments and is designed for visual improvement.

The brand positions itself as a boutique alternative to larger competitors such as Invisalign and SmileDirectClub.

== See also ==
- Invisalign
- Align Technology
- Zia Chishti
