= D-list =

D-list could refer to

- D-list, a status on the Ulmer scale of fame and "bankability", meaning very minor celebrity
  - Kathy Griffin: My Life on the D-List, a reality television show
- Difference list, in computer science, a data structure for representing lists with efficient append operations

== See also ==
- Delisting (disambiguation)
