= Lahore American School =

- لاہور امریکن سکول

Location
- 15 Canal Bank Road, Upper Mall; Lahore, Punjab; Pakistan
- Coordinates: 31°32′48.5″N 74°21′13.2″E

Information
- School type: Private; Independent
- Mottoes: Excellence in Education
- Established: 1956
- Grades: Pre School-12
- Enrollment: 400 total 200 Preschool-grade 5; 200 middle 100 high
- Campus: Suburban
- Colors: Blue and Gold
- Mascot: Water buffalo
- Affiliation: Middle States Association of Colleges and Schools; Near East South Asia Council of Overseas Schools
- Website: www.las.edu.pk

Lahore American school (commonly shortened to LAS) (Urdu: لاہور امریکن اسکول) is an American high school based in Lahore, Punjab, Pakistan. It is one of the few international schools in the city. LAS is a co-educational school.

== About ==
The Lahore American School (LAS) is a school that offers a program for students preschool aged through grade 12. The school is open to any and all nationalities. Selective admission is based on prior academic achievement, standardized test scores, a writing sample, and a personal interview. Founded to serve overseas American students, LAS is an international institution following an American college preparatory program. The curriculum is standards-based as consistent with contemporary curricula in the United States.

The school closely follows the American school system in social terms as well as academia, and hosts over 400 students of various nationalities. (Note: Enrolment was 461 at the start of the 2006/2007 school year) The teachers are from diverse national backgrounds and highly experienced in overseas education.

Of the 2007-2008 intake, 4% are American citizens, 92% are Pakistani citizens and 3% are Korean citizens 1% are citizens from other nations.

The main language of instruction at LAS is English, while French, Urdu, and Mandarin Chinese are taught as foreign languages. The academic calendar runs on a two-semester basis, the first going from August to December and the second from January to May. Due to the diverse nature of the student population, both local and international holidays are observed and the school is respectively closed.

== History ==
The school was founded in 1956 by a parent group to offer American college-preparatory education for students. Since June 1985, Lahore American School is accredited by the Middle States Association of Colleges and Schools.

== Notable alumni ==
- Mohsin Hamid
- Daniyal Mueenuddin
- Zia Chishti
- Moonis Elahi

== See also ==
- Americans in Pakistan
