= DrSmile =

German dentistry brand

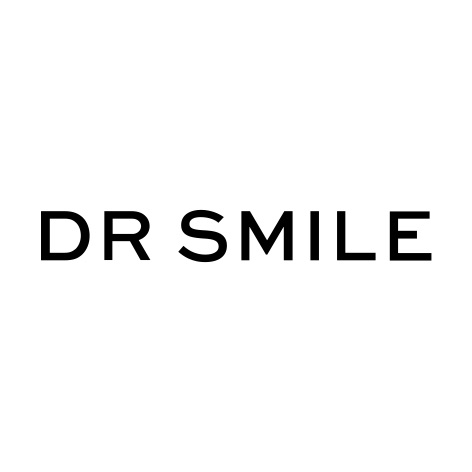
- Type: GmbH
- Industry: Dental
- Founded: 2016
- Founder: Jens Urbaniak, Christopher von Wedemeyer
- Headquarters: Berlin, Germany
- Area served: Germany
- Products: Invisible Aligners for teeth
- Number of employees: 500 (2022)
- Parent: Urban Technology GmbH
- Website: https://www.drsmile.de/

DrSmile is a dentistry brand by German startup Urban Technology GmbH based in Berlin.

== History ==
DrSmile was founded in 2016 in Berlin by Jens Urbaniak and Christopher von Wedemeyer. Urbaniak worked for Rocket Internet and is a co-founder of Go Butler, and von Wedemeyer previously worked as an investment banking analyst. In July 2020, it was announced that Swiss dental implant manufacturer Straumann bought a majority stake in the start-up for 110 million CHF and secured an option on the remaining shares. In May 2022, DrSmile acquired the start-up PlusDental for €131 million. In August 2024 Straumann announced the sale of its DrSmile aligner business. Straumann said it had signed an agreement to sell DrSmile to Barcelona-based clear aligner provider Impress Group.

== Company ==
DrSmile has locations in Berlin, Düsseldorf, Frankfurt, Hamburg, Cologne, Munich, Nuremberg, Stuttgart and Hannover. The company works with a partner network of dentists and orthodontists.

== Treatment ==
DrSmile focuses on aesthetic dental treatments with invisible aligners that correct minor and medium malpositions of teeth. Aligners are produced using 3D printer technology.

== Controversy ==
The company has been criticized for its level of medical consultation and examination, as well as for having patents take impressions of their teeth at home without seeing a dentist. DrSmile claimed that it works in cooperation with dentists and orthodontists and distances itself from procedures that do not involve professional medical consultation. In 2019, a German court ruled that certain dental standards were not met. In March 2024, the company was fined PLN 2,782,817 for actions violating the collective interests of consumers by the Polish Office of Competition and Consumer Protection. Another fine of PLN 674,622 was imposed for using a prohibited contractual clause, but this decision is not yet final.

Besides controversy about the lack of medical consultation and examination, DrSmile has a significant number of negative reviews. These show a lot of issues with aggressive sales techniques and lack of communications. Customers of DrSmile enter into a contract with DZK Deutsche Zahnklinik GmbH, which appears to be a mailbox clinic. The Ordnungsamt (Public Office) has started an investigation.
