= IOC (disambiguation) =

IOC most commonly refers to the International Olympic Committee.

IOC or IoC may also refer to:

== Computing ==
- IBM Open Class, IBM C++ product
- Indicator of compromise, an artifact likely indicating a computer intrusion
- Inversion of control, a software design pattern

== Organizations ==
- Imperial Orange Council, international council of the Orange Order
- Indian Ocean Commission
- Indian Oil Corporation, large Indian oil and gas company
- Indian Orthodox Church, Kerala, India
- International Olive Council
- Initiative on Cities, urban research institute at Boston University
- Initiatives of Change, international organisation "building trust across the world's divides" (formerly Moral Re-Armament)
- Intergovernmental Oceanographic Commission of Unesco
- International Ornithological Committee, former name of the International Ornithologists' Union
- International Order of Characters, an organization dedicated to improving the fields of aviation and aerospace
- Iron Ore Company of Canada

== Other uses ==
- Icon of Coil, Norwegian electronic music band
- Immediate or cancel, a type of order used on some stock exchanges
- Index of coincidence, the technique in cryptography of counting the number of times that identical letters appear
- Initial operating capability, minimum level of deployment, especially in the US military
- Intraoral camera, a device used to take photos of the inside of a patient's mouth
- Italian organized crime
