= Tom Glocer =

American businessman

Thomas H. Glocer
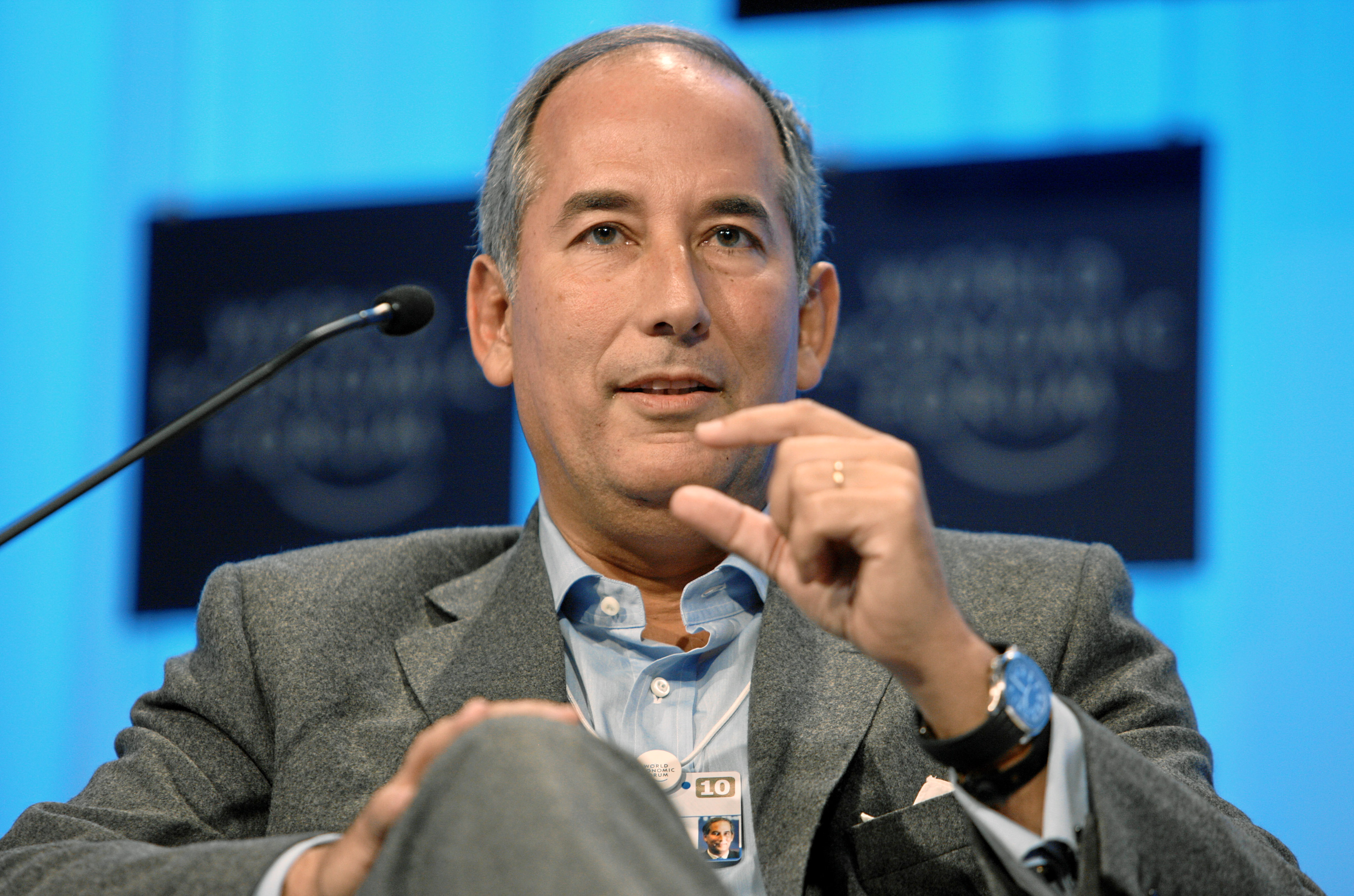
- Glocer at the World Economic Forum annual meeting in Davos, 2010
- Born: October 8, 1959 (age 67); New York City, New York, U.S.
- Education: Columbia University (BA); Yale Law School (JD)
- Occupations: Former CEO of Thomson Reuters and Reuters
- Spouse: Maarit
- Children: 2

Tom Glocer (born October 8, 1959) is an American business executive and the former CEO of Thomson Reuters and Reuters.

== Biography ==
He is a co-founder and executive chairman of BlueVoyant and Capitolis, as well as cyber defense and fintech start-ups. He is also a partner in Communitas Capital, an early-stage venture fund focusing on investments in financial technology and marketplaces, and the Chairman of ISTARI, a new type of cyber risk management company.

Glocer is a director of Merck & Co., Morgan Stanley (Lead Director), and Publicis Groupe; a member and former director of the Council on Foreign Relations; a trustee of the Cleveland Clinic; a member of, the President's Council on International Activities at Yale University, the Yale Law School Executive Committee, the Yale School of Management Council, the Columbia University Global Center (Paris) Board, the Atlantic Council, the International Tennis Hall of Fame Board, the European Business Leaders Council, and the Madison Council of the Library of Congress.

Glocer stepped down from Thomson Reuters at the end of 2011 and is now managing partner of Angelic Ventures, LP, a family office investing in fintech, media, “big data”, and healthcare, e.g., Windward. He is also an advisory board member of Afiniti, an American big data and artificial intelligence business. He held a number of senior leadership positions at Reuters, including president of Reuters LatAm and Reuters America, before being named CEO of Reuters Group PLC in July 2001. Before joining Reuters, initially the legal department in 1993, he had worked as a merger and acquisitions lawyer for American law firm Davis Polk & Wardwell in New York, Paris, and Tokyo.

Glocer holds a bachelor's degree in political science from Columbia University and a J.D. from Yale Law School. He is married to Finnish model Maarit Glocer (née Leso) with two children and lives in New York City.
