= IPR =

IPR may refer to:

== Law ==
- Intellectual property rights
- Inter partes review, US procedure for challenging patents

== Media ==
- Independent Public Radio network, Minnesota, US
- Indie Press Revolution, a sales network for role-playing games
- WBST (Indiana Public Radio), a public radio network in east central Indiana
- Interlochen Public Radio, Michigan, United States
- Iowa Public Radio, US

== Organisations ==
- Institute for Plasma Research, India
- Institute of Pacific Relations (1925–1960)
- Institute for Policy Research and Catholic Studies, Washington, DC
- Institute for Public Relations, University of Florida
- Northwestern University Institute for Policy Research, Evanston, IL
- Mikael Ter-Mikaelian Institute for Physical Research, Armenia
- Prague Institute of Planning and Development, Czech Republic

== Science and mathematics ==
- Indirect potable reuse of reclaimed water
- Interproximal reduction, an orthodontic treatment
- Inverse Participation Ratio, measure of localization or purity of a quantum mechanical state

=== Chemistry ===
- i-Pr or ^{i}Pr, abbreviations for the isopropyl group in organic chemistry
- IPr, an N-heterocyclic carbene, see IMes

== Others ==
- Indicação de Proveniência Regulamentada (Indication of Regulated Origin), Portuguese wine designation
