= SureSmile =

SureSmile is a type of customized orthodontic arch wires used by orthodontists to straighten teeth. The technique utilizes 3-D imaging, treatment planning software and a robot to create the wires. The technique is reported to decrease the time required to complete orthodontic treatment by 34% and increase the precision of the results.

Early design of wire

== Design ==
The orthodontist uses digital images of a patient's mouth and teeth from either a white light scanner or cone beam computed tomography (CBCT). The software takes the teeth and individually aligns them to the proper position.

Once the orthodontist has virtually designed the smile and bite, the SureSmile software plans a route for moving the teeth into the proper place and sends this information to a robot that bends and shapes the wires to the patient's configurations. The customized wire is then sent back to the orthodontist to be placed on the patient.

== Lingual braces ==
SureSmile has a lingual or behind teeth braces option called SureSmile QT. With lingual braces, brackets are adhered to the underside of the teeth on the top arch, bottom arch or both arches. Most patients choose lingual braces for aesthetic reasons, as they cannot be seen. Orthodontists that offer lingual braces will often suggest putting lingual braces on the upper teeth and clear ceramic braces on the bottom though patients can choose to have lingual braces on both arches.

== History ==
The SureSmile technology was developed and is owned by OraMetrix, a company founded in 1998 by Friedrich (Fritz) Riemeier and Dr. Rohit Sachdeva, through the merger of two medical technology companies, one U.S. based and the other, German. The company was launched globally in 1999 with the help of a $150,000 investment from STARTech Early Ventures LLC. Other key investors include Brentwood Venture Capital, CenterPoint Ventures, Rho Ventures and STAR Ventures.

The SureSmile System received 510(k) marketing clearance from the U.S. Food and Drug Administration (FDA) in November 2000. In 2003, OraMetrix relocated its U.S. corporate headquarters from Dallas to a larger, 25,000-square-foot facility in Richardson, Texas.

In 2018, Dentsply acquired SureSmile from Orametrix.
