= Intraoral scanner =

Digital dental scanners

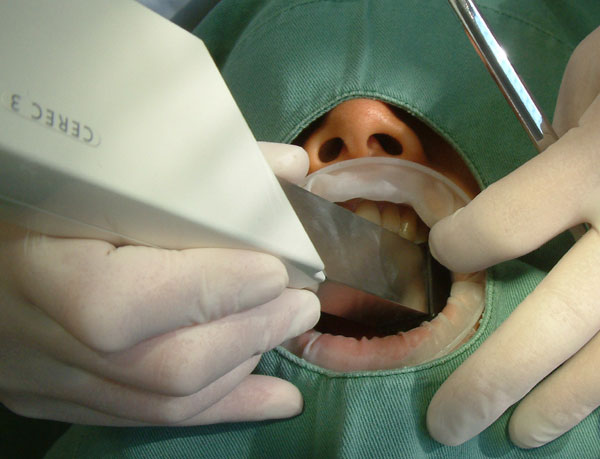
Intraoral scanner inside a patients mouth

An intraoral scanner is a handheld device that generates digital impression data of the oral cavity. The scanner's light source is projected onto the scan items, such as whole dental arches, and a 3D model processed by the scanning software is then shown in real-time on a touch screen.

== Types of intraoral scanners ==
Intraoral scanners in dentistry come in various types, each with unique features. Here are some common types:

1. Optical Scanners: Use light to capture images of the oral cavity. Examples include the iTero and 3Shape TRIOS.
2. Laser Scanners: Utilise laser technology for precise measurements and can provide high-resolution 3D images..
3. Video Scanners: Capture continuous video footage, which is then processed to create a 3D model.
4. Hybrid Scanners: Combine multiple technologies (e.g., optical and laser) to enhance accuracy and speed.

Features of an intraoral scanner:

1. Accuracy:
  1. Essential for minimising errors and reducing the need for retakes.
  2. Higher accuracy leads to better fitting restorations and fewer patient visits.
2. Speed:
  1. Fast scanning improves patient comfort and decreases lab turnaround times.
  2. Example: Primescan can complete a full arch scan in under a minute.
3. Ease of Use:
  1. User-friendly scanners require minimal training and integrate smoothly into existing workflows.
4. Price:
  1. Prices have become more competitive, making scanners more accessible.
  2. Consider long-term savings and return on investment when comparing costs.
5. Integration with Existing Workflows:
  1. The scanner should enhance efficiency by reducing repeat impressions and improving treatment times.
6. Software Compatibility:
  1. Look for scanners with open software that easily connects with your lab's systems.
  2. Primescan supports connections to major lab CAD software for seamless data sharing.

What do patients think about intraoral scanners:

Based on 9 studies, Participants generally reported more positive experiences with intraoral scanners regarding smell, taste, sound, vibration, nausea, and queasiness, leading to a preference for digital methods in terms of comfort. However, there was no significant difference in anxiety levels between the two approaches. The studies also showed mixed results when it came to how participants perceived the time taken for each method.

== How does it work? ==
With the use of high-resolution cameras, the intra-oral scanner can record dental arches, implants, and their dimensions by projecting a light beam—either structured light or laser—onto the surface of the teeth. It can also record the distortion that occurs when the beam strikes these structures. This is made possible by the distortion that occurs when the instrument's beam strikes the different structures inside the oral cavity. The cameras record this distortion, which is then emphasised in the 3D model using specialised software.

A physical representation of the scanned material will be produced by first creating a sort of tracing of points from which a triangulation between these points, or mesh, will be built. The final 3D model that will be formed will represent the virtual structure of the patient's oral cavity in both shape and size.

Digital intraoral scanners, which are built and manufactured in compliance with ANSI/IEC 60601-1 requirements, are classified as Class I medical electrical devices. A computer monitor to enter prescriptions, approve scans, and review digital files; a wireless mobile workstation to facilitate data entry; and a portable camera wand to gather scan data in the patient's mouth are the three main parts of every scanner. Energy from either laser or white light is projected from the wand onto an item and reflected back to a sensor or camera inside the wand in order to collect surface data points Tens or hundreds of thousands of measurements are made every inch using algorithms, producing a three-dimensional (3D) representation of the object's shape.

The scanner's measurement speed, resolution, and accuracy are determined by the technology the wand uses to collect surface data. There are now four different kinds of imaging technologies in use:

Using projected laser light, triangulation, which is employed in CEREC4, calculates the angles and separations from known sites. Both the angle between the laser and the sensor and the distance between the laser source and the sensor are known. According to the Pythagorean theorem, the system calculates the angle of reflection when light bounces off the item, and consequently, the distance between the laser source and the object's surface. The target tissue must be covered with a thin layer of opaque powder in order for this technology to produce consistent and reliable light dispersion.

Laser light is projected onto the target tissue via a filtering pinhole in parallel confocal imaging. Any light coming from above or below the plane of focus is blocked by a tiny aperture in front of the sensor, which is positioned at the confocal (in-focus) imaging plane in relation to the target. The accuracy of the scan is maximised because only focused light that reflects off the target tissue will pass through the filter and reach the sensor for processing; out-of-focus light, or faulty data, is removed. The "point-and-stitch reconstruction" method uses a parallel confocal system to tomographically slice the object and stitch together thousands of slices of data to get a whole image. Accordion fringe interferometry (AFI) projects three "fringe patterns" of light using two light sources on the tooth and tissue.

Depending on the object's particular curvature, a fringe design will distort and take on a different pattern as it touches the surface. "Fringe curvature" is the term used to describe this distortion in the fringe pattern. An HD video camera, positioned approximately 30° away from the projector, records surface data points of the fringe curvature. Changes in tooth colours and materials have no effect on the differential measurement since the distance is determined by the discrepancies between the three precision optical readings.

An HD video camera with trinocular imaging—three tiny video cameras at the lens—captures three exact views of the tooth for three-dimensional in-motion video. Behind the cameras, a complementary metal-oxide semiconductor (CMOS) sensor transforms light energy into electrical signals.

The 3D data, which are recorded in a video series and modelled in real time, are determined by concurrently calculating the distances between two data points from two angles. In contrast to the heavier coating needed for triangulation, only a little dusting is necessary to capture surface data points. Unlike the slower point-and-stitch reconstruction of surface data, both AFI and 3D in-motion video imaging use HD video cameras instead of a sensor to quickly acquire images in real time. Because of their greater dynamic range of luminosity, AFI scanners can scan reflective objects without the need for powder coating.

=== Basic principles ===
Intraoral scanning is a digital dentistry technique that creates precise 3D models of the mouth's hard and soft tissues. The process consists of several key steps, each contributing to the final digital model used for treatment planning and manufacturing.

1. Scanning Process: The scanning process begins with the intraoral scanner capturing real-time data through a light source, such as a laser or structured light, which projects patterns onto the tooth surface. As the scanner moves around the mouth, the reflected light is recorded, creating a continuous stream of data. This allows the clinician to obtain a digital representation of the oral cavity quickly.

2. Data Acquisition: The scanner continuously gathers data points as it moves around the oral cavity, recording the surface details of the teeth and soft tissues, providing the foundational data for creating the 3D model. The real-time data acquisition allows the clinician to view the scanning progress and make adjustments if needed.

3. 3D Model Generation: Once the data is captured, specialised software processes the data points and assembles them into a high-resolution 3D model of the patient's dental anatomy. This model includes detailed representations of the teeth, gums, and surrounding tissues, allowing for precise analysis and planning. The 3D model can be rotated and zoomed in on, providing a detailed view for clinical examination.

4. Editing and Validation: After generating the 3D model, it is edited and validated in real-time. Clinicians can refine areas that may have been inadequately captured or check for errors in the data. Some scanners have built-in validation tools that automatically detect incomplete scans or inaccuracies, helping to ensure a complete and accurate model.

5. Application in CAD/CAM: The validated 3D model is then imported into computer-aided design (CAD) software, where it can be used for designing restorations such as crowns, bridges, or orthodontic appliances. The digital model can be sent directly to computer-aided manufacturing (CAM) systems.

=== Laser-Based Triangulation in Intraoral Scanners ===
The triangulation method is a commonly used imaging technology in intraoral scanners. This technique involves projecting a fringe pattern onto the surfaces within the oral cavity . The system calculates the 3D coordinates by measuring the angles and distances between multiple points, typically using a light source and two or more detectors. As the scanner collects data from multiple angles, it constructs a digital model by identifying the exact position of each point. Triangulation-based scanners have become essential in digital dentistry workflows, allowing for accurate measurements and detailed 3D representations of dental structures, aiding in procedures such as prosthetic design and orthodontic assessments.

The triangulation method operates on the geometric principles of triangulation, which involves using the positions of two known points and the angles between them to calculate the location of a third, unknown point. In the context of intraoral scanning, a light source projects a structured pattern, such as a grid or stripe, onto the surface of the teeth. The scanner then uses two or more sensors or cameras positioned at specific angles relative to the light source to capture how this pattern deforms over the three-dimensional surface of the teeth and gums. By analysing these deformations, the scanner software can precisely calculate the coordinates of each point on the tooth surface, creating a highly accurate 3D representation of the dental structures

== Intraoral scanners vs conventional way of taking impression ==
The use of digital impressions has changed prosthodontics, enabling a more precise and faster method for recording intraoral information. Digital scanners: Though first marketed in the early 2000s, technology developments from the late 1980s have now made digital scanners much smaller, more economical, and omnipresent. The significant benefits of this approach include increased precision, decreased patient anxiety, quicker restoration time and an improvement in the communication protocols with colleagues in different fields as well as digital sharing with patients for better interactive learning. There has been a significant change in processes that have enabled the streamlining of workflows and providing efficient treatment.

The advantages and disadvantages of optical impressions with respect to conventional physical impressions (i.e. impressions made with trays and materials) are presented below and summarized in the table below:

| Advantages | Disadvantages |
|---|---|
| Less patient discomfort | Difficulty detecting deep marginal lines of prepared teeth |
| Time efficient | Learning curve |
| Simplified clinical procedures | Purchasing and managing costs |
| Better communication with the dental technician | |
| Better communication with patients | |
| No more plaster casts | |

=== Are optical impressions as accurate as conventional impressions? ===
Accuracy is the most important aspect of an IOS scanner. It should detect correct impressions. Accuracy in metrics and engineering refers to the degree of agreement between a measured quantity and its true value. Accuracy is a combination of trueness and precision. Trueness, often known as bias, refers to the degree of agreement between expected test or measurement results and actual values. Precision refers to the degree of agreement between repeated measurements of the same thing under certain conditions. Ideally, an IOS should have great trueness, closely matching reality.An IOS should accurately detect impression details and create a virtual 3D model that closely resembles the actual model, with minimal deviations. To determine the accuracy of an IOS, it must be compared to a reference scan from a powerful industrial machine, such as an industrial optical scanner, articulated arm, or coordinate measurement machine. After overlapping the pictures and models, reverse-engineering tools can provide colorimetric maps that show the micrometric discrepancies between the IOS and reference model surfaces.

Precision may be easily evaluated by combining many scans/models acquired with the same IOS at different times and assessing the distances/differences at the micrometric level. An IOS can have high trueness but low precision, and vice versa. Unsatisfactory optical impressions have a negative impact on the prosthetic workflow, as the prosthodontist's main objective is to reduce the marginal gap. Trueness and precision are primarily dependent on the scanner acquisition/processing software, which handles the most challenging task: 'creating' the 3D virtual models. The sensitivity of an instrument depends on its resolution, which refers to the least difference it can measure. However, this is dependent on the scanner's powerful cameras. Optical impressions are clinically acceptable and comparable to traditional impressions for single-tooth restorations and fixed partial prosthesis with up to 4-5 elements, according to current scientific literature. Optical impressions for short-span restorations provide equal accuracy and precision to traditional impressions.

However, when it comes to long-span restorations like full-arch prostheses on natural teeth or implants or partial fixed prostheses with more than five parts, optical impressions don't seem to be as accurate as traditional impressions. The fabrication of long-span restorations, for which traditional imprints are still recommended, does not seem to be compatible with the inaccuracy produced during intraoral scanning of the complete tooth arch.

== How different specialities use intraoral scanner ==
=== Prosthodontists ===
Intraoral scanners (IOS) have become integral to modern prosthodontics by enabling precise digital impressions of the dentition and surrounding tissues. These devices replace traditional impression materials, streamlining workflows, enhancing accuracy, and improving patient experience. Prosthodontists benefit significantly from IOS through better case planning, efficient prosthesis design, and improved communication with dental laboratories and interdisciplinary teams.

Applications in Prosthodontics

- Fixed Prosthodontics: IOS are widely used for designing crowns, bridges, inlays, and onlays. High-resolution scans help capture fine margins and occlusal anatomy with precision.
- Removable Prosthodontics: While challenging, IOS is increasingly used for partial dentures and complete dentures by combining with facial scanners and functional impression techniques.
- Implant Prosthodontics: Digital impressions taken with scan bodies allow for precise capture of implant positions, essential for fabricating abutments and prostheses.
- Occlusal Analysis and Articulation: IOS can be paired with jaw tracking devices or virtual articulators for accurate bite registration and occlusion mapping
- Treatment Planning and Simulation: Digital data aids in designing full-mouth rehabilitations and aesthetic smile makeovers, offering patients virtual previews.

Advantages of IOS in Prosthodontics

- Precision and Detail: Digital impressions reduce distortion and allow for precise margin capture and better-fitting restorations
- Improved Efficiency: IOS shortens chairside time, speeds up lab communication, and reduces turnaround for prostheses
- Patient Comfort: Eliminates the discomfort of impression trays and materials, particularly beneficial for patients with gag reflexes
- Enhanced Collaboration: Data can be easily shared with labs, technicians, and other specialists for seamless interdisciplinary work
- Digital Archiving: IOS scans are stored and reused for future planning, saving time and improving long-term care.

Challenges and Limitations

- Subgingival Margin Capture: It remains difficult to capture margins below the gingival level accurately with IOS.
- Removable Prosthodontics: Capturing movable soft tissue and functional borders remains a challenge for complete denture fabrication.
- Learning Curve and Cost: Adapting to digital workflows requires training, and initial equipment investment can be substantial for smaller practices.
- Reflective and Metallic Surfaces: IOS may struggle with reflective materials or pre-existing metallic restorations, causing scan errors.

Future Directions

- Improved Soft Tissue Capture: Next-gen IOS devices aim to better capture mobile tissue and subgingival details for improved prosthesis fit.
- AI Integration: Automated margin detection, smile design, and prosthetic planning using AI could streamline workflows
- Full-Digital Denture Workflow: Advancements are underway to make complete denture fabrication fully digital, including border moulding and functional impressions.
- Interoperability and Open Systems: Efforts to improve compatibility between scanner systems and CAD/CAM software will allow greater flexibility in lab workflows

=== Orthodontists ===
Advanced computerised equipment called intraoral scanners (IOS) have completely changed dental workflows in a number of specialities, but especially in orthodontics. Clinicians can diagnose, plan, and treat patients more accurately and efficiently thanks to these technologies' ability to produce incredibly precise 3D images of the intraoral environment. Their use in orthodontics has revolutionised the field, greatly enhancing both clinical results and patient experience.

Diagnosis and Treatment Planning

Orthodontists use intraoral scanners to create detailed 3D digital models of patients' teeth and oral structures. These models are used to analyse malocclusions, tooth crowding, spacing issues, and jaw relationships. The digital workflow allows orthodontists to simulate and visualise treatment outcomes before initiating therapy, enhancing diagnostic accuracy and patient communication

Digital Impressions for Appliances

Intraoral scanners replace traditional impressions, which can be uncomfortable and less accurate. Orthodontists now rely on IOS for designing custom orthodontic appliances such as clear aligners, retainers, and indirect bonding trays. This process ensures better-fitting devices and reduces the number of adjustments needed during treatment.

Integration with Clear Aligner Therapy

A significant application of intraoral scanners in orthodontics is their integration with clear aligner therapy systems like Invisalign. After capturing a digital scan of the teeth, orthodontists can collaborate with aligner manufacturers to develop personalised treatment plans. The use of IOS ensures faster turnaround times for aligner delivery compared to traditional impressions.

Progress Monitoring

IOS facilitates real-time monitoring of treatment progress. Orthodontists can compare digital scans taken at different stages of treatment to ensure teeth are moving as planned. This capability enhances treatment predictability and allows for timely intervention if necessary.

Patient Education and Engagement

By visualising digital models and treatment simulations, orthodontists can help patients understand their dental condition and the benefits of proposed treatments. This improves patient satisfaction and compliance, as they are more involved in their care process.

Advantages of Intraoral Scanners in Orthodontics

- Improved Accuracy: Digital impressions are highly accurate, reducing errors in appliance fabrication.
- Patient Comfort: IOS eliminates the need for traditional impression materials, which some patients find uncomfortable or intolerable.
- Time Efficiency: Faster data acquisition and integration with digital workflows save chair time.
- Eco-Friendly: The elimination of physical impression materials and plaster models reduces waste.
- Data Storage and Sharing: Digital scans are easily stored and shared electronically, facilitating interdisciplinary collaboration and second opinions.

Challenges and Limitations

Despite their benefits, intraoral scanners face some limitations in orthodontic practice:

- Cost: High initial investment and maintenance costs can be a barrier for smaller clinics.
- Learning Curve: Orthodontists and staff may require training to use IOS effectively.
- Complex Cases: In cases involving severe malocclusions or extensive dental crowding, capturing accurate scans may be challenging.

Future Directions

As technology evolves, the role of intraoral scanners in orthodontics is expected to expand further. Advances in artificial intelligence and machine learning could enable automated diagnosis and treatment planning, while improved scanner designs will likely make them more accessible to practitioners worldwide

=== Periodontists ===
Intraoral scanners (IOS) are advanced digital devices that capture three-dimensional (3D) images of the oral cavity. These images can be used for diagnosis, treatment planning, and communication in various dental specialties, including periodontics. By replacing traditional impression techniques with digital workflows, intraoral scanners have improved patient comfort, reduced clinical errors, and enhanced procedural efficiency. IOS can be used for diagnosing, treatment planning, customised restorations and documentations.

Periodontal Diagnosis and Assessment:

- Mapping gingival contours and tissue levels.
- Monitoring disease progression with 3D imaging of soft and hard tissues.
- Measuring periodontal pockets using adjunctive tools.

Treatment Planning for Surgical Procedures:

- Precise evaluation of bone defects for guided bone regeneration (GBR).
- Planning for flap designs and soft tissue grafting.
- Integration with CBCT scans for implant placement in periodontally compromised patients.

Fabrication of Customized Restorations:

- Scanning for provisional restorations in cases with soft tissue involvement.
- Supporting crown-lengthening procedures through digital modeling.

Documentation and Patient Communication:

- Visualizing treatment progress with sequential scans.
- Educating patients using detailed 3D images of their periodontal condition.

Advantages of Intraoral Scanners in Periodontics

- Precision and Accuracy: High-resolution images allow accurate mapping of soft tissue and gingival margins.
- Non-invasive Workflow: Eliminates the discomfort associated with traditional impressions, especially for patients with periodontal sensitivity.
- Efficiency and Speed: Faster capture of impressions reduces chairside time for both patients and practitioners.
- Integration with Digital Technology: Combines with software for surgical guides, orthodontic planning, and prosthetic design; enhances multidisciplinary collaborations.
- Reduced Errors: Minimizes distortions common in traditional impressions.

Challenges and Limitations

- Soft Tissue Management:Difficulty in scanning areas with inflamed or bleeding gums; challenges in capturing subgingival margins accurately.
- Learning Curve: Requires time and training for clinicians to adapt to new workflows.
- Cost of Equipment: Initial investment in scanners and software can be prohibitive for smaller practices.
- Data Integration Issues: Compatibility challenges with certain software systems.
- Limitations in Severe Periodontal Cases: In cases with significant mobility, gingival recession, or complex anatomy, traditional methods may still be preferred.

Future Directions

- Improved Scanning Capabilities: Development of scanners capable of capturing subgingival areas more precisely.
- AI Integration: AI algorithms for automated diagnosis of periodontal disease using digital scans
- Real-time Gingival Health Monitoring: Wearable or portable intraoral scanners for tracking periodontal health.
- Reduced Costs and Accessibility: Advances in technology making IOS more affordable and accessible to smaller clinics.
- Enhanced Software Integration: Seamless integration with treatment planning platforms and diagnostic tools.

=== Endodontist ===
Intraoral scanners (IOS) have revolutionized dental workflows by providing precise 3D digital impressions of the oral cavity. For endodontists, these devices offer unique advantages in diagnosis, treatment planning, and communication. IOS enhances procedural accuracy by integrating with advanced imaging systems, enabling detailed visualization of the complex anatomy involved in endodontic treatments

Applications in Endodontics

Diagnosis and Assessment:

- Creating detailed 3D models of teeth to assess fractures, caries, and anatomical complexities.
- Visualizing coronal restorations and marginal integrity before initiating endodontic procedures

Treatment Planning and Documentation:

- Integrating IOS data with CBCT imaging for enhanced visualization of root canal anatomy and periapical lesions
- Designing access cavity preparations virtually
- Monitoring treatment outcomes with sequential scans

Restorative Procedures Following Root Canal Therapy:

- Designing and fabricating post-endodontic restorations, including crowns and onlays, with high precision.
- Capturing post-space impressions for custom posts.

Guided Endodontics:

- Utilizing IOS for creating templates for guided access cavity preparation, especially in calcified canals.
- Enhancing accuracy in minimally invasive endodontic treatments.

Patient Communication and Education:

- Using visual models to explain procedural steps and post-treatment outcomes.

Advantages of Intraoral Scanners in Endodontics

- Precision and Accuracy: Captures fine details of coronal anatomy and restoration margins, crucial for post-endodontic restorations. Facilitates the design of guided access preparations.
- Seamless Integration with Digital Tools: Combines with CBCT data for comprehensive treatment planning. Streamlines workflows for CAD/CAM restorations
- Non-invasive and Time-efficient: Replaces traditional impression materials, offering greater comfort to patients. Reduces chairside time by expediting restorative workflows.
- Improved Documentation: Provides digital records for tracking treatment progress and archiving case details.
- Enhanced Communication: Facilitates interdisciplinary collaboration with prosthodontists and general practitioners.

Challenges and Limitations

- Subgingival Margin Capture: Difficulty in accurately scanning deep subgingival areas or inflamed tissues.
- High Initial Costs: Investment in IOS and compatible software may be financially burdensome for smaller practices.
- Steep Learning Curve: Requires time for clinicians to adapt to digital workflows and master the technology.
- Data Accuracy in Complex Cases: Limited ability to capture fine details in patients with restricted mouth opening or excessive saliva.
- Compatibility Issues: Integration challenges with existing endodontic software or systems

Future Directions

- Enhanced Subgingival Scanning Capabilities: Development of IOS with improved sensors and algorithms for capturing subgingival areas.
- AI-Powered Diagnostics: Leveraging AI to analyze scans for detecting cracks, fractures, and lesions.
- Portable and Cost-effective Devices: Innovation in making IOS accessible for smaller clinics and mobile practices.
- Integration with Augmented Reality (AR): AR overlays for real-time guidance during access cavity preparation and canal shaping.
- Improved Workflow Integration: Seamless compatibility with CBCT systems, CAD/CAM technology, and guided surgical tools.

=== Examination & Diagnosis ===
Intraoral scanners (IOS) are digital devices that capture 3D images of the oral cavity, offering an alternative to traditional impression techniques. In the context of general examination and diagnosis (E&D), IOS enables clinicians to gather detailed, accurate data for identifying dental and oral conditions. This technology enhances visualization, improves patient comfort, and integrates seamlessly with digital workflows for treatment planning and communication.

Applications in General Examination and Diagnosis

Initial Patient Assessment:

- Provides a baseline 3D model for tracking oral changes over time.
- Identifies anomalies such as caries, attrition, fractures, and malocclusion

Caries Detection:

- Combined with adjunct tools for early detection of carious lesions, especially on occlusal and proximal surfaces.

Periodontal Health Assessment:

- Maps gingival margins and assesses periodontal pocket depths when integrated with other diagnostic tools.
- Monitors gum recession and soft tissue changes.

Oral Cancer Screening and Lesion Mapping:

- Captures detailed images of suspicious areas for better evaluation and documentation.

Occlusion and Bite Analysis:

- Provides accurate digital models to evaluate occlusion, detect bite issues, and monitor changes in temporomandibular joint (TMJ) function.

Monitoring Progression of Conditions:

- Sequential scans allow clinicians to track disease progression or healing after treatment.

Advantages of Intraoral Scanners in General E&D

Enhanced Precision: High-resolution imaging allows for detailed visualization of the oral cavity. Facilitates early diagnosis of subtle dental issues.

Time-Efficient Workflow: Rapid image capture reduces time spent on data collection. Immediate digital models allow for faster treatment planning and patient discussions.

Non-Invasive and Comfortable: Eliminates the need for traditional impressions, improving the patient experience. Particularly beneficial for patients with gag reflexes or oral sensitivities.

Improved Communication: Real-time visualizations help educate patients about their oral health. Facilitates interdisciplinary communication with other specialists

Digital Records: Provides an accurate and reproducible record of the oral cavity for long-term tracking

Challenges and Limitations

Soft Tissue Interference: Difficulty in accurately capturing details of mobile or inflamed soft tissues.

Subgingival Visualization: Limited ability to capture subgingival areas, which are crucial for periodontal and restorative diagnostics

High Initial Investment: The cost of purchasing and maintaining IOS devices can be a barrier for some practices

Learning Curve: Clinicians may require training to use the technology effectively and integrate it into existing workflows.

Limitations in Complex Cases: Challenges arise in patients with restricted mouth opening, excessive saliva, or extensive restorations that reflect light

Future Directions

1. Enhanced Diagnostic Capabilities: Development of IOS with improved subgingival imaging and higher resolution for soft tissue capture.
2. Artificial Intelligence (AI) Integration: AI-powered diagnostics to automatically detect caries, fractures, and other anomalies from scans.
3. Cost Reduction: Advancements in technology to make IOS devices more affordable for general practitioners.
4. Integration with Wearable Technology: Portable IOS for routine monitoring in remote or underserved areas
5. Real-time Data Analytics: Scanners providing immediate risk assessment for caries, periodontal disease, and other conditions.
6. Improved Workflow Compatibility: Seamless integration with diagnostic tools, electronic health records (EHR), and treatment planning systems.
