= Zia Chishti =

Pakistani–American investor and business executive

- Born: Wilson Lear; 1971 (age 54–55); Bar Harbor, Maine, US
- Education: Lahore American School; Columbia University; Stanford University
- Occupation: Business executive
- Known for: Orthoclear, Afiniti
- Spouse: Sarah Pobereskin (m. 2020)
- Awards: Sitara-e-Imtiaz for IT (2018)

Muhammad Ziaullah Khan Chishti (né Wilson Lear; born 1971) is a Pakistani-American investor and business executive. He is the co-founder of Align Technology and TRG Global. He is also the co-founder of Afiniti.

After starting his career as a Morgan Stanley investment banker, Chishti invented the medical device Invisalign and co-founded Align Technology to market the product in 1997. He was CEO of Align until 2003, when he founded the investment fund The Resource Group. In 2005 he co-founded both Orthoclear and Afiniti, the latter of which develops artificial intelligence for use in customer call centers. Chishti was a named inventor on around 150 issued patents by 2018, and had co-founded three unicorn startup companies. In 2021, he resigned after accusations of sexual harassment and violence in his career were made public.

== Early life and education ==
Zia Chishti was born as Wilson Lear in 1971 in Bar Harbor, Maine. His father, George Lear, was an American while his mother was Pakistani. After his father's suicide in 1974, he and his mother moved to Lahore, Pakistan. At that time, his name was legally changed to Zia Chishti to avoid anti-Christian sentiment in Pakistan at that time. After graduating from the Lahore American School, his mother sent him back to his American roots. In 1988 he moved to New York City to begin attending Columbia University, where he earned a BA in computer science and economics in 1992.

Chishti subsequently became an investment banker at Morgan Stanley, working in New York and London on mergers and acquisitions. He also worked for McKinsey & Company as a management consultant in London. In 1997 he graduated from Stanford University in California with an MBA.

== Career ==
=== Invisalign Technology ===
Undergoing a course of orthodontic treatment in his early twenties, Chishti envisioned clear plastic appliances instead of metal braces. Working on the project in his dorm room at Stanford University, his invention, Invisalign, allowed computers to customize plastic retainers to gradually shift patient's teeth. As founding CEO and chairman, in 1997 he co-founded the medical device company Align Technology in Sunnyvale, California. The Food and Drug Administration granted Align Technology approval to sell and market Invisalign in 1998. Chishti secured funding from Kleiner Perkins Caulfield & Byers, and the company had raised around $140 million in venture capital by 2000. Align Technology listed on the NASDAQ in January 2001 with a valuation of $1 billion. Chishti left Align Technology in 2003 and sold his shares in the company.

=== The Resource Group and Orthoclear ===
After leaving Align Technology, Chishti co-founded Pakistani private equity firm The Resource Group (TRG) with his two partners, his relative Hasnain Aslam and investor Mohammed Khaishgi of the Kheshgi family. TRG started off by operating 2 distinct private equity entities under the same name, one in Pakistan known as TRG Pakistan and the other in the United States known as TRG International. Chishti was made TRG Pakistan's CEO while Khaishgi led TRG International in the United States. TRG's first acquisition was the Pakistani operations of Align Technology in Lahore, which Align had shed in 2001. Chishti "took the abandoned office filled with laid-off workers and asked them to trust his vision for a call-center empire." Chishti listed TRG Pakistan on the Karachi Stock Exchange in July 2003. By 2005, the company had operations in Karachi and Lahore and was supporting and acquiring American call centers.

In 2005, Chishti and several former Align Technology employees founded the medical device company Orthoclear. The company settled a patent infringement lawsuit filed by Align in 2006, with Align purchasing Orthoclear's intellectual property for $20 million. Chishti subsequently returned his attention to TRG.

=== Afiniti and unicorn valuations ===
In 2005 Chishti founded Afiniti in Washington, D.C., with TRG holding approximately half of the startup's stock. As CEO and chairman, Chishti wrote the first draft of Afiniti's software on his dining room table in 2006. The product uses artificial intelligence to help companies increase call center efficiency. Afiniti had a valuation of $1.6 billion by 2017 and was considered a unicorn, which are companies valued at over $1 billion. Chishti continued as Afiniti's CEO and chairman of the board, which also included directors such as John W. Snow and José Maria Aznar.

By 2017, The Resource Group was operating as an equity vehicle with a number of subsidiaries, for example the offshore company TRG International. It primarily invested in "business process outsourcing (BPO) and related technology companies," according to Chishti. He was awarded the Sitara-e-Imtiaz Award for IT by Pakistani President Mamnoon Hussain in March 2018. That April, Chishti was also a recipient of the MIT AI Innovator Award.

== Views on artificial intelligence ==
Chishti has been a critic of the "hype" surrounding artificial intelligence, arguing in 2018 that society is headed for another AI winter. He has stated that the benefits of artificial intelligence are evolutionary, rather than revolutionary, and current successful use cases of the technology revolve around the identification of patterns within complex data, including medical image anomaly detection, hydrocarbon detection, consumer behavioral predication and fraud detection.

== Sexual assault accusations ==
On November 16, 2021, a former female employee of Afiniti, Tatiana Spottiswoode, testified before the United States House Committee on the Judiciary. She testified that she had first met Chishti through her father's business ties when she was 12 or 13; that she began working at Afiniti in 2016 under an employment agreement that included arbitration and confidentiality; and that over the following roughly 18 months he alternately pressured her for sex and, when she refused, ignored or humiliated her at work in ways that made her fear losing her job. She said she told him repeatedly—including in writing—that she did not consent to a sexual relationship, and that in a January 2017 email she wrote that he had behaved inappropriately "with my explicit nonconsent" on three occasions. She further testified that he refused to speak to her for months after she declined a trip to Cuba with him; that during a work trip to Dubai he put his hand inside her pants and grabbed her buttocks in front of coworkers without the company taking action on her behalf; that he called her a "bitch" in front of coworkers when she refused to hold his hand; that shortly before a September 2017 performance review involving her work on Brazilian accounts he sent two pornographic emails describing a rape fantasy including strangulation; and that during a 2017 business trip to Brazil he sexually assaulted and beat her in a hotel room, responding "Good" when she said he was hurting her, after which she sought medical care for cuts, bruising, and possible concussion.

On November 18, 2021, Chishti left his roles at Afiniti. On November 28, 2021, he resigned from all roles at TRG and its affiliates.

In December 2022, Chishti filed a federal defamation lawsuit against Spottiswoode, saying she had "weaponized" a "consensual love affair" and had lied under oath. The lawsuit was criticized as a disincentive to speak against rich abusers who could afford to bully witnesses with the threat of expensive litigation. A week later, the House Judiciary Committee that Spottiswoode had testified to entered a 2019 arbitration tribunal ruling into the Congressional Record in support of the veracity of Spottiswoode's claims. Journalist Michael Schaffer called the document "utterly devastating for Chishti": the arbitrator and his investigation had found that Chishti's conduct was "outrageous in character and extreme in degree, going beyond all possible bounds of decency"; that Chisti had groped Spottiswoode in front of colleagues, insulted her, brutally beat her, and had then lied about his activities after the fact; that Chishti had harassed other young female Afiniti employees and they had received monetary settlements in addition to Spottiswoode; and that the company had taken no action to attempt to prevent similar conduct from occurring in the future. It is speculated that Spottiswoode could not release the document herself without breaking the confidentiality requirements and imperiling her settlement, hence why the Judiciary Committee did it instead.

Chishti lost a mandatory arbitration case on the dispute in which he was ordered to pay over $5 million to Spottiswoode. He subsequently lost, in October 2024, a defamation court case against Spottiswoode in the Washington DC District Court, which the court stated was a "thinly veiled attempt to undo the outcome of an arbitration that rejected Chishti’s account of events and ruled in Spottiswoode’s favour".

In March 2025, The Daily Telegraph apologised and paid substantial damages in a libel settlement with Chishti in England, for its repeated reporting from November 2021 to February 2023 of sexual misconduct allegations made by Spottiswoode.

== Personal life ==
In July 2001, People Magazine listed Chishti among the top 50 bachelors in the United States. Chishti works out of Washington, D.C. He is an avid chess player and skier.

In 2020, Chishti married Sarah Pobereskin in Bermuda.
