= Delisting =

Delisting may refer to:

- Delisting (Canadian medicare), the removal of medical coverage for a certain operation by Canadian medicare
- Delisting (listed building), the removal of protected status from a listed building
- Delisting (stock), the removal of a stock from a stock exchange
- Vendor de-listing, withdrawal of a supplier or their products from a company's supply chain
