= Interproximal reduction =

Orthodontic treatment

Interproximal reduction (IPR, also called interproximal enamel reduction (IER), slendering, air rotor stripping (ARS) or reproximation) is the practice of mechanically removing enamel from between the teeth to achieve orthodontic ends, such as to correct crowding, or reshape the contact area between neighboring teeth. After reducing the enamel, the procedure should also involve anatomic re-contouring and the protection of interproximal enamel surfaces.

== History ==
In 1944, Murray L. Ballard was the first to advocate for the stripping of the lower anterior teeth due to crowding in a paper published in The Angle Orthodontist. Other authors also advocated about slenderizing the teeth for next 40 years but it was not until the 1980s when John J. Sheridan's Air Rotor Stripping (ARS) technique for interproximal reduction captured significant interest. He published two papers in the Journal of Clinical Orthodontics in which he explained his technique. He stated that the IPR procedure could be used as an alternative to procedures of extraction or expansion of teeth during orthodontic treatment. In 2004, Zachrisson stated that IPR can be used to improve the esthetics of anterior teeth. When a crowded arch is aligned, "black triangles" form which can be removed with IPR of the anterior teeth.

Some evidence suggests that modern diets of soft and processed foods have resulted in a significant decrease in natural interproximal wear, making dental crowding more prevalent in modern populations.

== Application ==
IPR is an irreversible procedure and can be an alternative to dental extraction. Indications for the procedure include mild to moderate crowding (4–8mm), black triangles in anterior teeth, enhancing retention and stability after orthodontic treatment, and correction of the Curve of Spee. IPR is contraindicated for patients with a high risk for caries, poor oral hygiene, active periodontal diseases, multiple restorations, greater than 8mm of crowding per arch, hypersensitivity to cold, and large pulp chambers.

== Amount ==
About 50% of proximal enamel can be stripped without causing any dental or periodontal problems. According to Sheridan, 2.5mm of space from IPR of five anterior contacts and 6.4mm of space from IPR from eight posterior contacts can be obtained. Due to individual anatomical variations and as a general recommendation, reduction for incisors should be limited to a maximum of 0.2mm per proximal surface or 0.4mm per tooth and measurements should be taken prior to substantial IPR.

== Techniques ==
IPR may be carried out using abrasive metal strips, diamond coated disks, or air-rotor stripping burs and abrasive coated strips. Metal strips may be more appropriate than disks for rotated teeth. Diamond disks must be used properly so as not to leave undercuts on the enamel or come into contact with the patient's soft tissue. When using air-rotor burs, it is recommended that the tips be squared-off so that they do not leave furrows. Burs also tend to produce a rough finish on the enamel surface.

The further study compared mechanical oscillating strips and IPR burs. It highlighted that diamond-coated IPR burs produce consistent enamel reduction with minimal thermal effects, provided adequate cooling measures are taken.

== Side effects ==
Excessive heat is known to cause damage to the pulp of the tooth. Therefore, to protect pulp against potential heat damage, both Sheridan and Zachrisson recommend that water be used during IPR to reduce effects on the dental pulp. IPR has also been known to cause caries and periodontal disease. However, the association has been a topic of debate. In fact, an observational study done by Zachrisson which looked at 61 subjects who went through IPR 10 years post-operatively, found that there were no signs of gingival recession or thinning of the labial gingiva in 93% of the patients.

It is recommended that to limit any side effects of IPR, topical fluoride application on the treated teeth or part-time wear of a thermoformed fluoride varnish-infused retainer. In a study where participants received fluoride after IPR, it was determined that this group had lesser chances of developing caries on the tooth surfaces treated with IPR than the group who did not receive any fluoride.
