= Anchorage (orthodontics) =

Way of resisting tooth movement in orthodontics

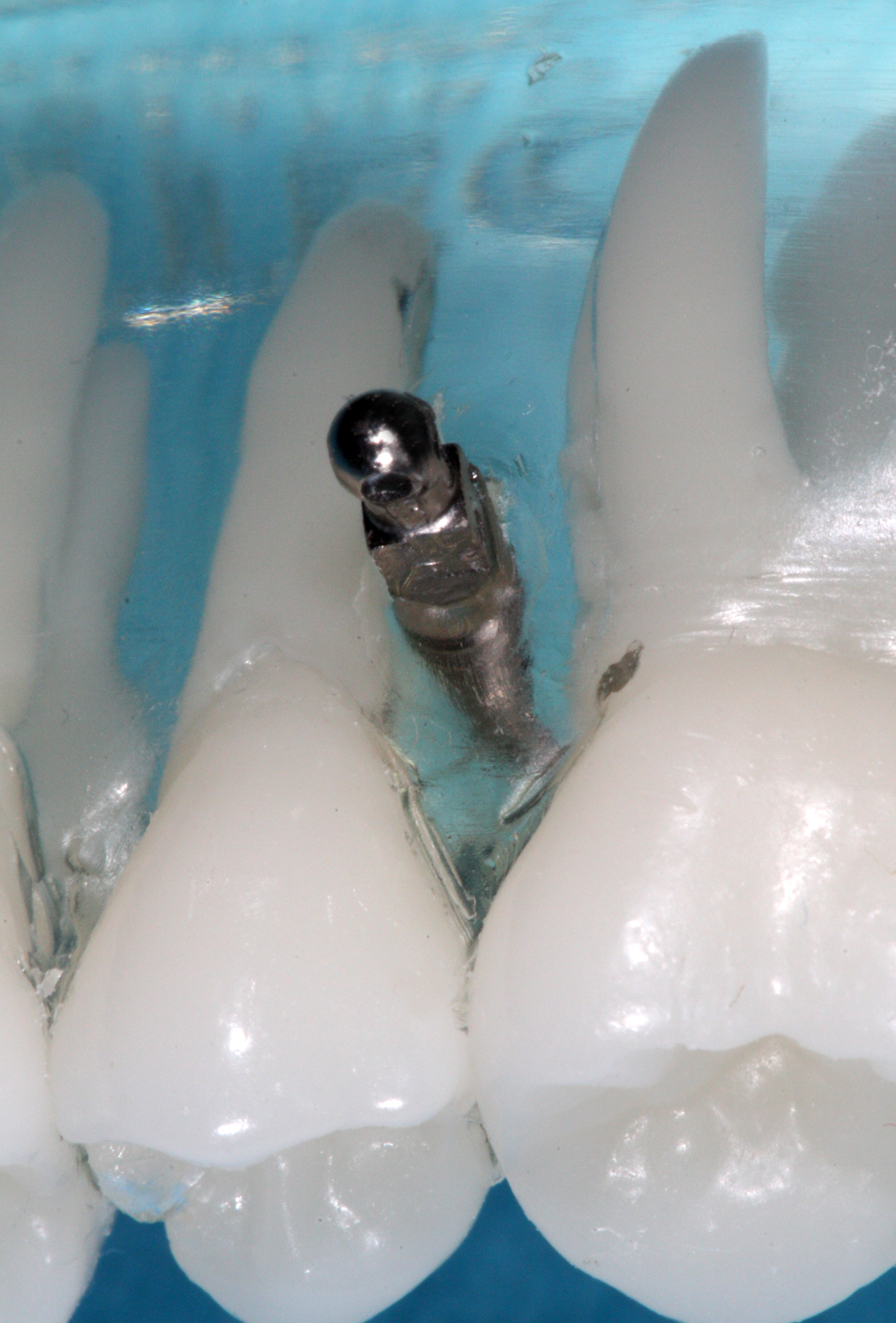
Temporary Anchorage Device

Anchorage a medical term in orthodontics is defined as a way of resisting movement of a tooth or number of teeth by using different techniques. Anchorage is an important consideration in the field of orthodontics as this is a concept that is used frequently when correcting malocclusions. Unplanned or unwanted tooth movement can have dire consequences in a treatment plan, and therefore using anchorage stop a certain tooth movement becomes important. Anchorage can be used from many different sources such as teeth, bone, implants or extra-orally.

Certain factors related to the anatomy of teeth can affect the anchorage that may be used. Multi-rooted, longer-rooted, triangular shaped root teeth usually provide more anchorage than the single-rooted, short-rooted and ovoid rooted teeth.

== History ==
One of the earliest uses of anchorage came from Henry Albert Baker for his use of the intermaxillary anchorage or Baker's Anchorage. This type of anchorage involves using elastics from one jaw to the other, in the form of either Class 2 elastics (moving upper teeth back) where lower molar teeth serve as anchors, or Class 3 elastics (moving lower teeth back) where upper molars serve as anchors. Intramaxillary anchorage is also used in the form of E-chain, when elastics are used from the back molar teeth to the front teeth in the same jaw to move teeth back of the mouth.

== Classification based on site ==
- Intraoral – This type of anchorage is established within the mouth. This involves primary and compound anchorage.
- Extraoral – This type of anchorage is established outside the mouth. This involves using headgear or face masks. One of the disadvantages of using extraoral anchorage is that the anchorage is away from the site of the tooth movement. In addition, in wearing orthodontic headgear, the compliance of patients is usually lower with adolescent patients, although good success is achieved with pre-teenage patients using headgear. The patient wears the appliance for less time, and thus less effects are seen. However, many studies have proved the headgear to be useful in providing anchorage during tooth movement. Extraoral anchorage can be divided into 3 different types.

Orthodontic headgear will usually consist of three major components:

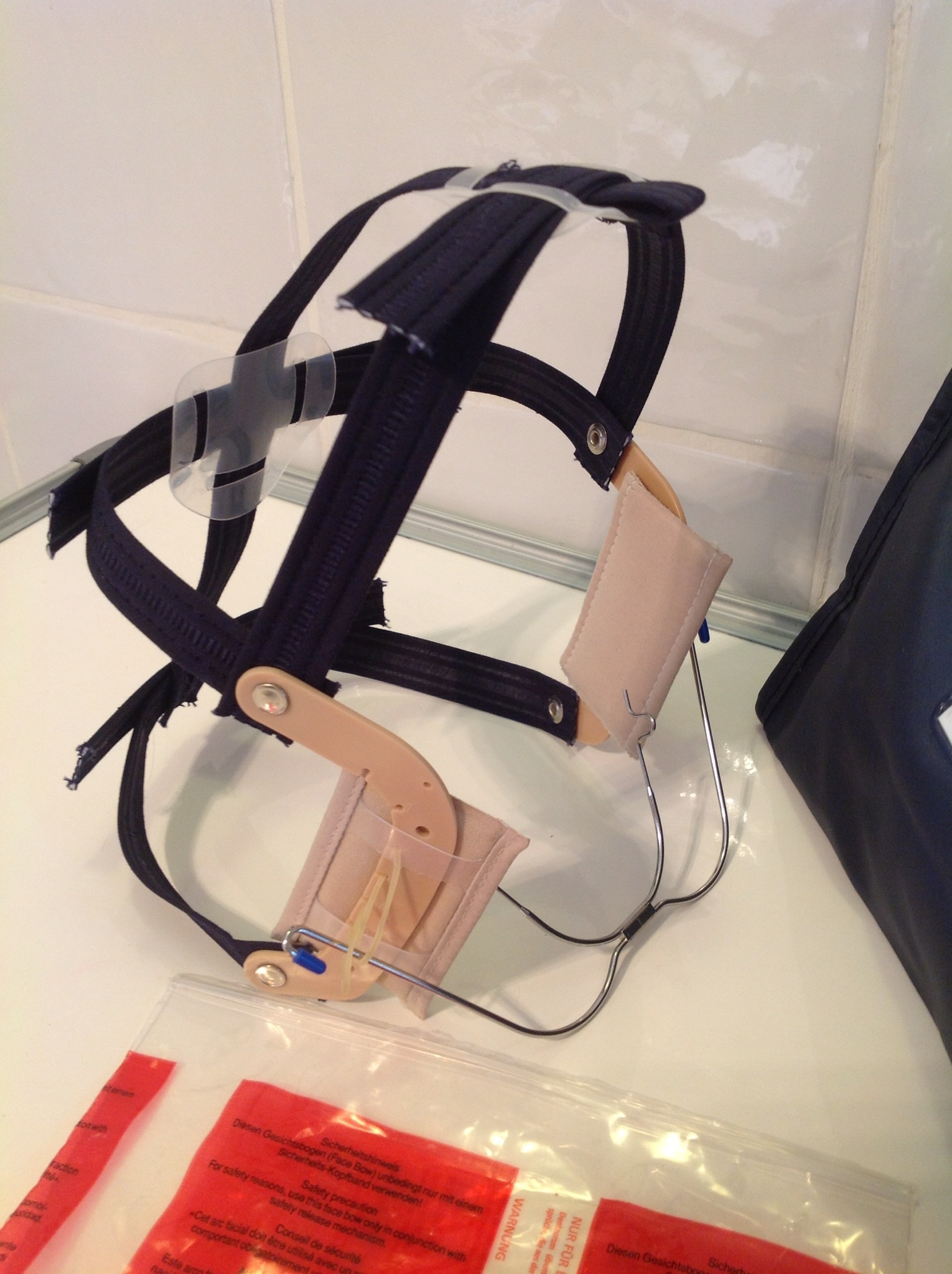
Full combination orthodontic headgear with headcap, fitting straps, facebow and elastics

  - Occipital – Used with headgear to use the occipital bone and surrounding area to move teeth
  - Cervical – Used with headgear to use the neck and surrounding area to move teeth
  - Combination – Used with headgear to use a combination of both occipital and cervical bones to move teeth in a linear fashion.
- Muscular – This type of anchorage involves using muscles and can involve a vestibular shield on some appliances.

== Classification based on number of teeth ==
Robert Moyers defined the classification of anchorage in the number of units.

- Simple/primary – Anchorage using one tooth
- Compound – Anchorage using two or more teeth
- Reinforced – Anchorage that uses additional teeth or any other appliances to reinforce the primary anchorage. This can involve extraoral or muscular anchorage. A reinforced anchorage based on appliances can use
  - Transpalatal Arch
  - Nance Appliance
  - Lower Lingual Holding Arch
- Reciprocal – Type of anchorage when two units of teeth move towards each other with equal distance.
- Stationary – Type of anchorage where the teeth move in a translation manner, not tipping.

== Classification based on space closure ==
Ravindra Nanda and Charles J. Burstone described three types of anchorages that are based on the need during a treatment where space closure is needed. In some orthodontic cases, teeth have to be removed in order to either relieve dental crowding or reduce a large overjet or overbite. Therefore, the space created after removing teeth is usually closed during an orthodontic treatment. A space can be closed by either moving back teeth forward or front teeth backward.

=== Group A Anchorage ===
This type is considered critical anchorage, which involves 75% movement of anterior teeth and 25% posterior teeth into the space created by extraction. Thus the expectation in this type of anchorage is to bring front teeth back.

=== Group B Anchorage ===
This type of anchorage is considered moderate, which involves 50% movement of both anterior and posterior teeth into the extraction space. The expectation in this type of anchorage is to see posterior teeth moving forward equally as compared to anterior teeth moving backwards.

=== Group C Anchorage ===
This type of anchorage is considered non-critical, which involves posterior teeth moving forward 75% of the time and front teeth moving backwards 25% of the time into the extraction space. Greater movement of back teeth is seen in this case.

=== Absolute Anchorage ===
This type of anchorage is needed in a treatment when there is 0% movement of posterior teeth forward and 100% movement of anterior teeth backwards. This type of anchorage is usually produced by using mini-implants or temporary anchorage devices.

== Classification based on implant ==
Orthodontic mini-implants can be used for the purpose of anchorage in an orthodontic treatment. The implants can be used to provide either direct or indirect anchorage.

=== Direct Anchorage ===
In this type of setup, orthodontic force is applied directly from the implant to one or multiple teeth. In this type of anchorage, the location of the implant plays a very important role due to different force vectors being affected.

=== Indirect Anchorage ===
In this type of setup, an implant is used to stabilize one or multiple teeth into a unit. An orthodontic force is then used against this unit to move single or multiple teeth. In this setup, the location of the implant is not as important as long as the implant is stable.

== Classification based on bone ==
=== Cortical Anchorage ===
Cortical bone is known to resorb slower than the medullary bone. Therefore, cortical anchorage is used in orthodontics to allow for slower movement of teeth, especially molars in the posterior dentition. A clinician may produce a movement which allows the buccal roots of the permanent molars to move buccally (outside), eventually contacting the cortical bone. It is claimed that by using cortical bone against posterior teeth, mesial movement of posterior teeth can be prevented which helps in anchoring the posterior teeth in the back of the jaw.

Idea of cortical bone anchorage is intensively used in Bioprogressive Therapy of Robert M. Ricketts who recommended using the cortical bone to slow the movement of the molar teeth in high anchorage cases.
