= Self-ligating bracket =

Permanent dental brace

Self-ligating brackets are defined as "a dental brace, which generally utilizes a permanently installed, moveable component to entrap the archwire". Self-ligating brackets have also been designed which do not require a movable component to hold the wire in place. Self-ligating braces may be classified into two categories: Passive and Active.

These braces were typically made from stainless steel but, in some cases, are available in ceramic or polycarbonate.

== History ==
The first patent for Self-ligating bracket was filed by Charles E. Boyd in 1933. Willam F. ford in 1951 introduced another self-ligating bracket under Johnson Twin wire technique. In 1971, A. J. Wildman introduced the Edgelok bracket which was the first type of self-ligating bracket that enjoyed commercial success. All these brackets were passive in type so far. In 1970s, a new system called SPEED appliance was introduced into the market. This was introduced by Dr. G. Herbert Hanson of Hamilton, Ontario, Canada. This bracket was considered revolutionary in the field of orthodontics because it was an active type of self-ligating bracket. SPEED stood for Spring-Loaded, Precision, Edgewise, Energy and Delivery. Then in 1986, Erwin Pletcher introduced the Activa Self-Ligating bracket. This bracket had a curved arm that rotated occluso-gingivally around the bracket. In 1995, Time Self-Ligating Bracket was introduced. A year later in 1996, Damon Bracket was introduced as Damon SL1 Bracket. A.J. Wildman introduced another bracket called Twinlock bracket. This bracket was named as Damon 2 bracket. In 2004, Damon 3 bracket was introduced which was a hybrid of metal and composite material.

== Comparison to Conventional Brackets ==
=== Elastic Ligature & Oral Hygiene ===
One of the most significant differences from conventional dental braces is the absence of elastic ligature (bands or ties). Self-ligating braces typically are smaller and more aesthetic since a metal door is required to hold wires in place. They also tend to stand off the teeth further toward the lips and cheeks. Proponents of self-ligating brackets say that patients with self-ligating brackets have better oral hygiene than patients with conventional brackets. The hygiene is related to the use of Elastic Ligature which serves as another factor for having plaque being retained. A systematic review and a meta-analysis study done by Yang et al. in 2016 stated that self-ligating brackets do not outperform conventional brackets in reliving discomfort or promoting oral health in clinic. Another systematic review published by Do Nascimento et al. stated that there is no evidence for a possible influence of the design of the brackets (conventional or self-ligating) over colony formation and adhesion of Streptococcus mutans.

=== Periodontal Status ===
A systematic review and meta-analysis done in a study by Arnold et al. in 2016 stated that differences in the periodontal status of adolescents undergoing orthodontic treatment with either conventional or self-ligating brackets were detected were non-significant. Therefore, there is no difference between using self-ligating bracket and conventional bracket in patients with periodontal problems.

=== Treatment Time ===
A systematic review published by Chen et al. in 2010 stated that shortened chair time and slightly less incisor proclination appear to be the only significant advantages of self-ligating systems over conventional systems that are supported by the current evidence. On the other hand, a study published by Papageorgiou et al. stated that their analysis showed treatment time being longer when self ligated orthodontic brackets are used compared to conventional orthodontic brackets.

=== Friction ===
A systematic review done by Ehsani et al. in 2009, stated that self-ligating brackets produce lower friction when coupled with small round archwires in the absence of tipping and/or torque in an ideally aligned arch. However, sufficient evidence was not found to claim that with large rectangular wires, in the presence of tipping and/or torque and in arches with considerable malocclusion, self-ligating brackets produce lower friction compared with conventional brackets. Other studies also agree that round wires produce less friction than the rectangular wires. They also stated that most of the evaluated studies agreed that friction of both self-ligated and conventional brackets increased as the archwire size increased. However, a study done by Pizzoni et al. stated that self-ligating brackets had a markedly lower friction than conventional brackets at all angulations.

== Active vs. Passive brackets ==
Self-ligating brackets can be of two types. Active self-ligating brackets have a clip that works to press on the archwire and a wire bracket interaction is observed. A passive self-ligating bracket has a door, which when closed, does not lead to any pressure on the archwire. Examples of active types include In-ovation, SPEED and Timelock brackets. Examples of passive types include Damon, eLock and SmartClip.

=== Friction ===
A study published by Pacheco et al. stated that when tested with rectangular wires, active self-ligating brackets showed significantly higher friction than passive self-ligating brackets, with results statistically similar to conventional brackets using same caliber archwires. These results were agreed upon by another study published in 2010 by Stefanos et al. which stated that Passive self-ligating brackets have lower static and kinetic frictional resistance than do active self-ligating brackets with 0.019 × 0.025-in stainless steel wire.

== Evolution of Self-ligating brackets ==
Below is the list of brackets that have been designed over past 80 years.

Company Name	Bracket Name	Year Manufactured
Russell Lock	Lock	1935
Ormco	Edgelock	1971
Forestadent	Mobil-Lock	1980
Orec	SPEED	1980
‘A’ Company	Activa	1986
Adenta	Timelock	1994
Ormco	Twinlock	1998
Ormco	Damon 2	2000
GAC	In-Ovation	2000
GAC	In-Ovation R	2002
Adenta	Evolution LT	2002
IOS	Pactive	2015
American Orthodontics	Empower 2	2016
