= Elastics (orthodontics) =

Rubber bands used in dentistry

Elastics are rubber bands frequently used in the field of orthodontics to correct different types of malocclusions. The elastic wear is prescribed by an orthodontist or a dentist in an orthodontic treatment. The longevity of the elastic wear may vary from two weeks to several months. The elastic wear can be worn from 12 to 23 hours a day, either during the night or throughout the day depending on the requirements for each malocclusion. The many different types of elastics may produce different forces on teeth. Therefore, using elastics with specific forces is critical in achieving a good orthodontic occlusion.

The term intermaxillary elastics is used when elastics can go from the maxillary to the mandibular arch. Intra-maxillary elastics are elastics used in one arch only, either mandibular or maxillary. People using elastics for orthodontic correction change their elastics three to four times during the day. Elastic wear is recommend to be used in a rectangular wire to minimize side effects. Elastic wear depends on the compliance of the patient. A non-compliant patient should never be instructed to continue wearing elastics, for whom other options may be considered.

== History ==
Natural rubber, used by the Incan and Mayan cultures, was the first known elastomer. Charles Goodyear developed the process of vulcanization, after which the use of natural rubber increased. Henry Albert Baker is the first person known to have used elastics to correct the position of teeth. In the late 1800s he named his elastic wear the Baker Anchorage. Others, including Edward Angle, the father of orthodontics, suggest that Calvin Case was the first to use intermaxillary elastics.

Natural rubber is known to absorb water, and its elasticity deteriorates fairly quickly. Therefore, latex elastics became prominent in orthodontic usage in the early 1900s. Later synthetic elastics developed in the 1960s superseded other types of elastics for use in orthodontic correction.

== Elastic forces ==
Elastics are available in many different type of forces. Following is the list of forces that can be found in different elastics. The forces and the labelling of the forces may depend on different manufacturers and types of elastics used. These forces pertain to intermaxillary elastics.

Force Rating	Force (oz.)	Force (g)
Light	2 oz.	56.7 g
Medium-Light	3 1/2 oz.	99.2 g
Medium	4 oz.	113.4 g
Medium-Heavy	5 1/2 oz.	155.9 g
Heavy	6 oz.	170.1 g
Extra Heavy	8 oz.	226.8 g

== Class II elastics ==
Class 2 elastics are used from the lower first molar to the upper canine tooth. They can be used for many different reasons, such as Class 2 malocclusions, to reinforce anchorage in a case where an extraction has been done, to allow the maxillary incisors to move backwards, and to correct midline deviation and allow buccal movement of backward-tipped lower incisors. Orthodontists generally use 12-16 oz elastics (3/16") in extraction cases or 2× 6 oz elastics on either side of the mouth (3/16"), but in non extraction cases 16-20 oz elastics (3/16") or 2× 8 oz elastics are used. It is very important to know the side effects of Class II elastics before using them in an orthodontic treatment. The following are the effects of Class 2 elastics:

- Extrusion of upper incisors
- Extrusion of lower first molar
- Flaring of the lower incisors
- Distal movement of the upper teeth and mesial movement of the lower teeth
- Steepening of the occlusal plane

=== Effect on Class II Malocclusion ===
A systematic review done by Janson et al. looking at the effect of Class 2 elastics in correcting class II malocclusions concluded that Class II elastics are effective in correcting Class II malocclusions and that their effects are primarily dento-alveolar.

== Class III elastics ==
Class 3 elastics are used when the molar relationship is close to Class 1 malocclusion. Class 3 malocclusions due to skeletal discrepancy (mandibular prognathism) cannot be corrected with Class 3 elastics. It is important to evaluate soft tissue and hard tissue esthetics of a patient before attempting to use Class 3 elastics. Elastic wear will only produce changes in dentition, with no documented changes produced in soft and hard tissue. The following are the side-effects of Class 3 elastics:

- Distal movement of the lower teeth and mesial movement of the upper teeth
- Flaring of the upper incisors
- Extrusion of the lower incisors
- Extrusion of the upper first molar
- Flattening of the occlusal plane

== Elastic ligatures ==
The small elastic band used to affix the archwire to the bracket is called a ligature. Usually changed at each adjustment, these come in many varied colours, including transparent. A series of ligatures connected to each other and used to pull teeth together with more strength is called a power chain. Ligatures can also be made of wire. Self-ligation makes use of a bracket with a sliding or rotating mechanism to ligate an archwire. This type of bracket replaces traditional elastic ligatures and typically cuts orthodontic appointment times drastically. Currently, self-ligating brackets make up about 10 percent of total bracket sales worldwide.

== See also ==
- Anchorage (orthodontics)
- Dental braces
