= Dental braces =

Form of orthodontics

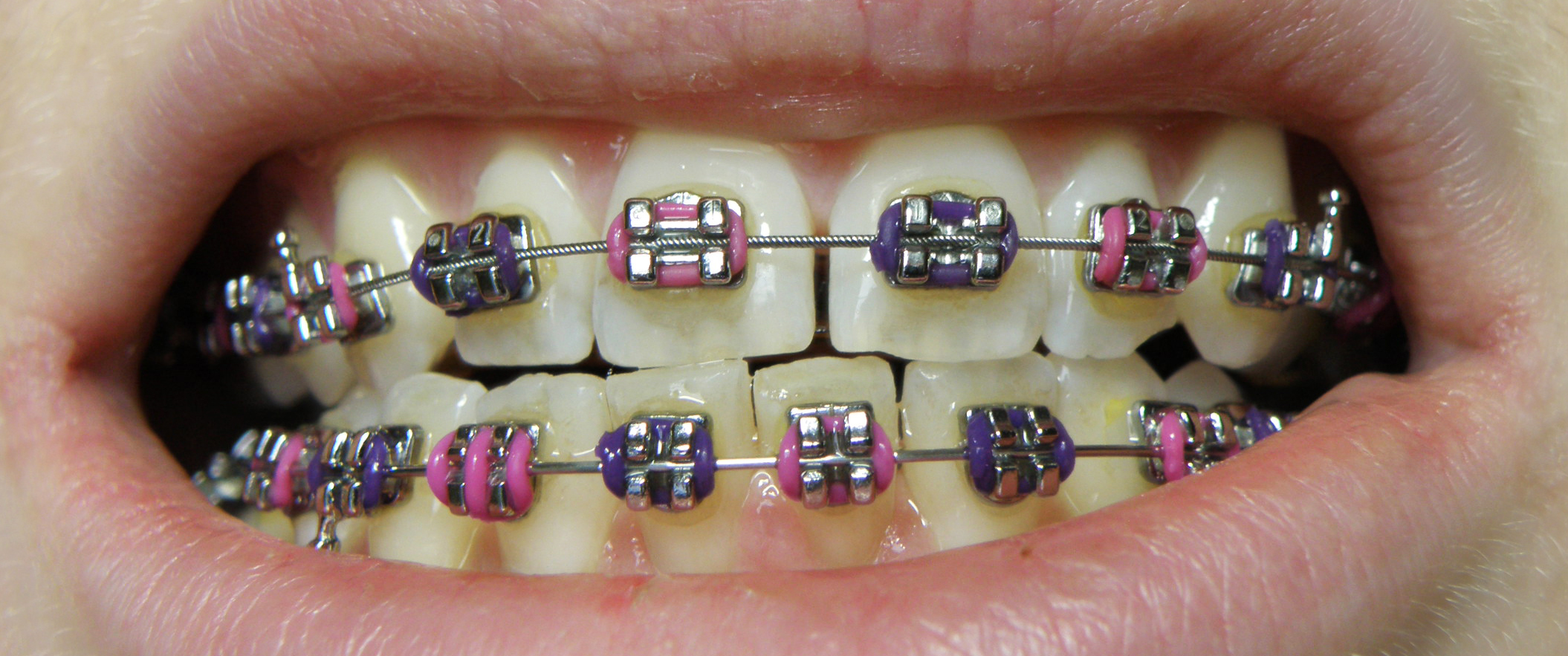
Dental braces

Dental braces (also known as orthodontic braces, or simply braces) are devices used in orthodontics that align and straighten teeth and help position them with regard to a person's bite, while also aiming to improve dental health. They are often used to correct underbites, as well as malocclusions, overbites, open bites, gaps, deep bites, cross bites, crooked teeth, and various other flaws of the teeth and jaw. Braces can be either cosmetic or structural. Dental braces are often used in conjunction with other orthodontic appliances to help widen the palate or jaws and to otherwise assist in shaping the teeth and jaws.

Braces are an orthodontic device. They are to make the teeth straight, and to correct problems in a person's bite. There are many natural problems which occur to the way teeth fit together, but not everyone needs or will need braces.

However, the use of braces is quite common, even when they are not medically necessary. Their cosmetic use is more common in countries with first world economies. To overcome the visibility of traditional metal braces, there are now nearly transparent braces.

The application of braces moves the teeth as a result of force and pressure on the teeth. Traditionally, four basic elements are used: brackets, bonding material, arch wire, and ligature elastic (also called an "O-ring"). The teeth move when the arch wire puts pressure on the brackets and teeth. Sometimes springs or rubber bands are used to put more force in a specific direction.

Braces apply constant pressure which, over time, moves teeth into the desired positions. The process loosens the tooth after which new bone grows to support the tooth in its new position. This is called bone remodelling. Bone remodelling is a biomechanical process responsible for making bones stronger in response to sustained load-bearing activity and weaker in the absence of carrying a load. Bones are made of cells called osteoclasts and osteoblasts. Two different kinds of bone resorption are possible: direct resorption, which starts from the lining cells of the alveolar bone, and indirect or retrograde resorption, which occurs when the periodontal ligament has been subjected to an excessive amount and duration of compressive stress. Another important factor associated with tooth movement is bone deposition. Bone deposition occurs in the distracted periodontal ligament. Without bone deposition, the tooth will loosen, and voids will occur distal to the direction of tooth movement.

== Types ==
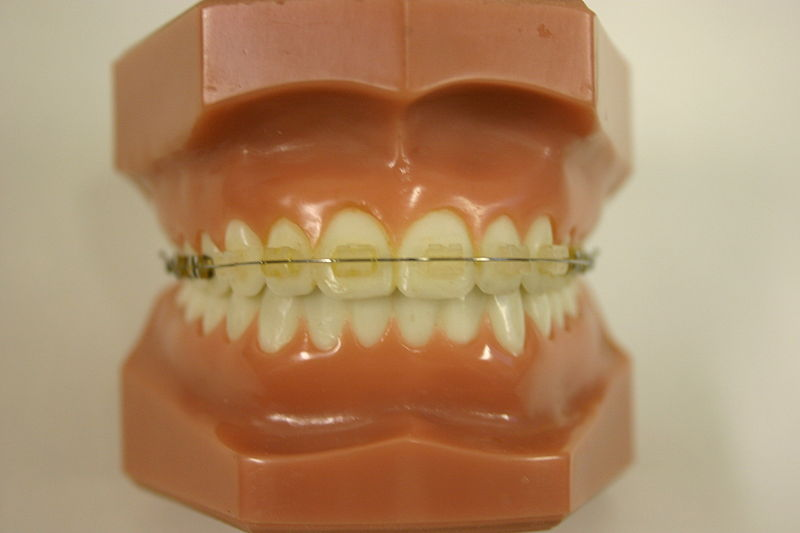
"Clear" braces

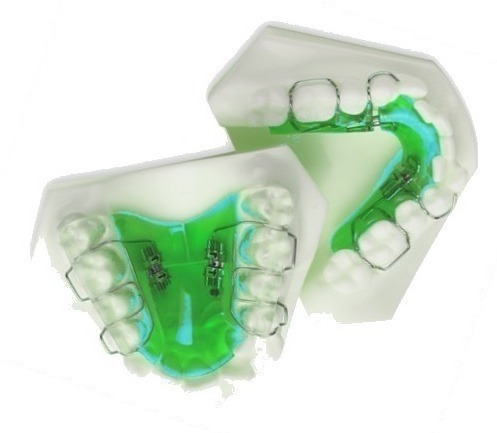
Upper and Lower Jaw Functional Expanders

- Traditional metal wired braces (also known as "train track braces") are stainless-steel and are sometimes used in combination with titanium. Traditional metal braces are the most common type of braces. These braces have a metal bracket with elastic ties (also known as rubber bands) holding the wire onto the metal brackets. The second-most common type of braces is self-ligating braces, which have a built-in system to secure the archwire to the brackets and do not require elastic ties. Instead, the wire goes through the bracket. Often with this type of braces, treatment time is reduced, there is less pain on the teeth, and fewer adjustments are required than with traditional braces.
- Gold-plated stainless steel braces are often employed for patients allergic to nickel (a basic and important component of stainless steel), but may also be chosen for aesthetic reasons.
- Lingual braces are a cosmetic alternative in which custom-made braces are bonded to the back of the teeth making them externally invisible.
- Titanium braces resemble stainless-steel braces but are lighter and just as strong. People with allergies to nickel in steel often choose titanium braces, but they are more expensive than stainless steel braces.
- Customized orthodontic treatment systems combine high technology including 3-D imaging, treatment planning software and a robot to custom bend the wire. Customized systems such as this offer faster treatment times and more efficient results.
- Progressive, clear removable aligners may be used to gradually move teeth into their final positions. Aligners are generally not used for complex orthodontic cases, such as when extractions, jaw surgery, or palate expansion are necessary.

== Fitting procedure ==
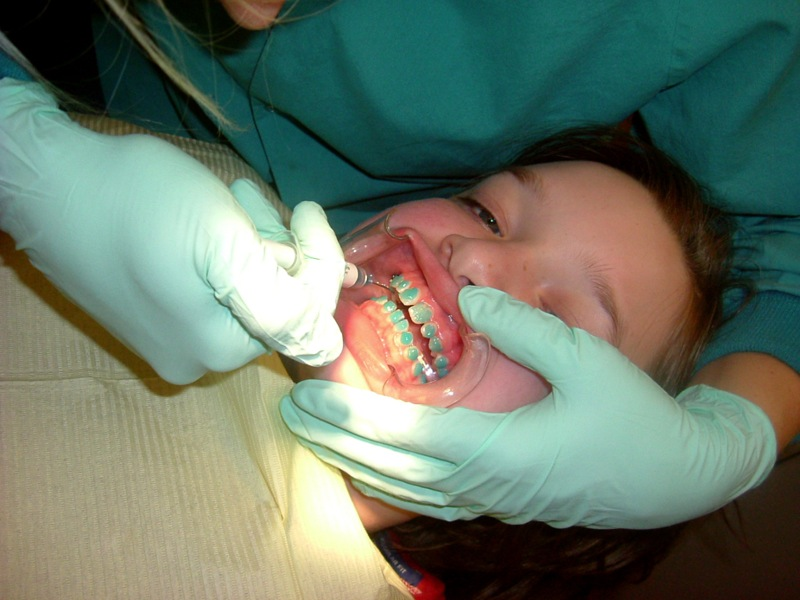
A patient's teeth are prepared for the application of braces.

Orthodontic services may be provided by any licensed dentist trained in orthodontics. In North America, most orthodontic treatment is done by orthodontists, who are dentists in the diagnosis and treatment of malocclusions—malalignments of the teeth, jaws, or both. A dentist must complete 2–3 years of additional post-doctoral training to earn a specialty certificate in orthodontics. There are many general practitioners who also provide orthodontic services.

The first step is to determine whether braces are suitable for the patient. The doctor consults with the patient and inspects the teeth visually. If braces are appropriate, a records appointment is set up where X-rays, moulds, and impressions are made. These records are analyzed to determine the problems and the proper course of action. The use of digital models is rapidly increasing in the orthodontic industry. Digital treatment starts with the creation of a three-dimensional digital model of the patient's arches. This model is produced by laser-scanning plaster models created using dental impressions. Computer-automated treatment simulation has the ability to automatically separate the gums and teeth from one another and can handle malocclusions well; this software enables clinicians to ensure, in a virtual setting, that the selected treatment will produce the optimal outcome, with minimal user input. Braces are known to cause discomfort after adjustments. In fact, some orthodontists recommend certain types of gum to help relive the pain that is caused.

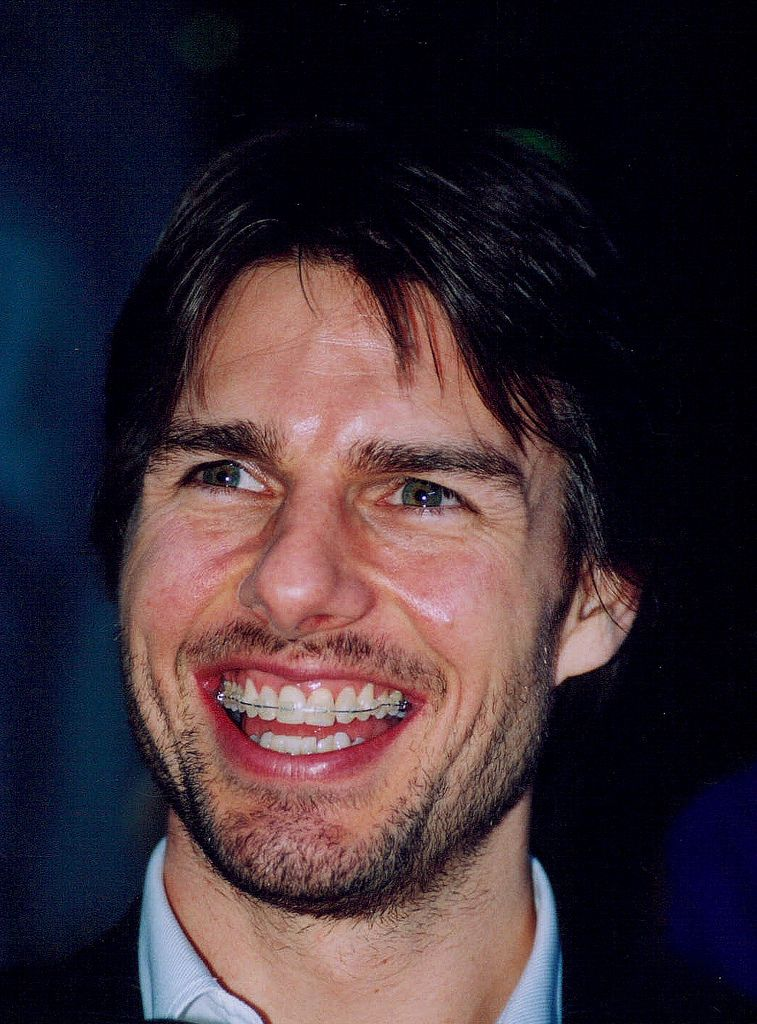
American actor Tom Cruise pictured with braces in 2002

Typical treatment times vary from six months to two and a half years depending on the complexity and types of problems. Orthognathic surgery may be required in extreme cases. About 2 weeks before the braces are applied, orthodontic spacers may be required to spread apart back teeth in order to create enough space for the bands.

Teeth to be braced will have an adhesive applied to help the cement bond to the surface of the tooth. In most cases, the teeth will be banded and then brackets will be added. A bracket will be applied with dental cement, and then cured with light until hardened. This process usually takes a few seconds per tooth. If required, orthodontic spacers may be inserted between the molars to make room for molar bands to be placed at a later date. Molar bands are required to ensure brackets will stick. Bands are also utilized when dental fillings or other dental works make securing a bracket to a tooth infeasible. Orthodontic tubes (stainless steel tubes that allow wires to pass through them), also known as molar tubes, are directly bonded to molar teeth either by a chemical curing or a light curing adhesive. Usually, molar tubes are directly welded to bands, which is a metal ring that fits onto the molar tooth. Directly bonded molar tubes are associated with a higher failure rate when compared to molar bands cemented with glass ionomer cement. Failure of orthodontic brackets, bonded tubes or bands will increase the overall treatment time for the patient. There is evidence suggesting that there is less enamel decalcification associated with molar bands cemented with glass ionomer cement compared with orthodontic tubes directly cemented to molars using a light cured adhesive. Further evidence is needed to withdraw a more robust conclusion due to limited data.

An archwire will be threaded between the brackets and affixed with elastic or metal ligatures. Ligatures are available in a wide variety of colours, and the patient can choose which colour they like. Arch wires are bent, shaped, and tightened frequently to achieve the desired results.

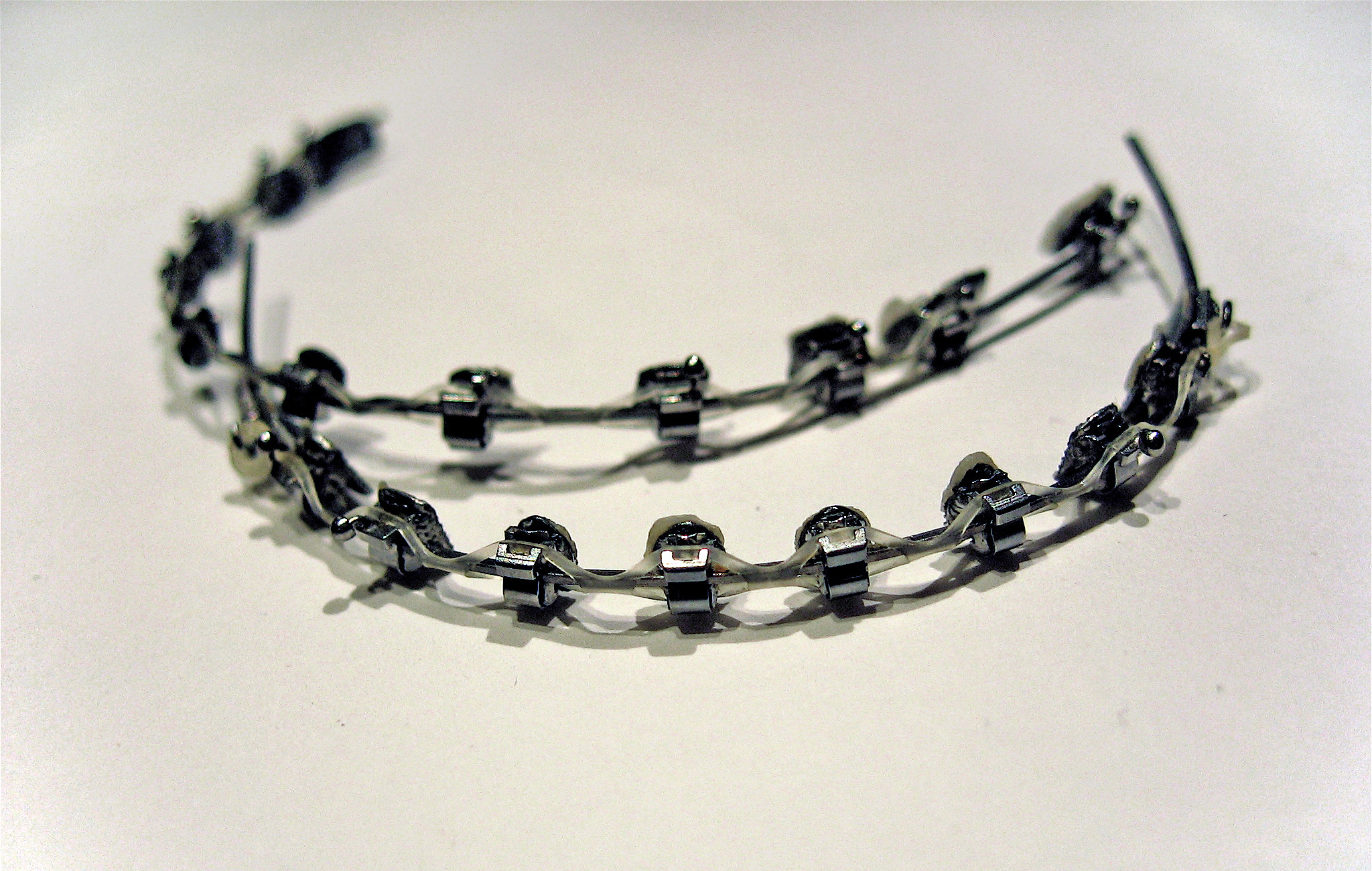
Dental braces, with a transparent power chain, removed after completion of treatment.

Modern orthodontics makes frequent use of nickel-titanium archwires and temperature-sensitive materials. When cold, the archwire is limp and flexible, easily threaded between brackets of any configuration. Once heated to body temperature, the arch wire will stiffen and seek to retain its shape, creating constant light force on the teeth.

Brackets with hooks can be placed, or hooks can be created and affixed to the arch wire to affix rubber bands. The placement and configuration of the rubber bands will depend on the course of treatment and the individual patient. Rubber bands are made in different diameters, colours, sizes, and strengths. They are also typically available in two versions: Coloured or clear/opaque.

The fitting process can vary between different types of braces, though there are similarities such as the initial steps of moulding the teeth before application. For example, with clear braces, impressions of a patient's teeth are evaluated to create a series of trays, which fit to the patient's mouth almost like a protective mouthpiece. With some forms of braces, the brackets are placed in a special form that is customized to the patient's mouth, drastically reducing the application time.

In many cases, there is insufficient space in the mouth for all the teeth to fit properly. There are two main procedures to make room in these cases. One is extraction: teeth are removed to create more space. The second is expansion, in which the palate or arch is made larger by using a palatal expander. Expanders can be used with both children and adults. Since the bones of adults are already fused, expanding the palate is not possible without surgery to separate them. An expander can be used on an adult without surgery but would be used to expand the dental arch, and not the palate.

Sometimes children and teenage patients, and occasionally adults, are required to wear a headgear appliance as part of the primary treatment phase to keep certain teeth from moving (for more detail on headgear and facemask appliances see Orthodontic headgear). When braces put pressure on one's teeth, the periodontal membrane stretches on one side and is compressed on the other. This movement needs to be done slowly or otherwise, the patient risks losing their teeth. This is why braces are worn as long as they are and adjustments are only made every so often.

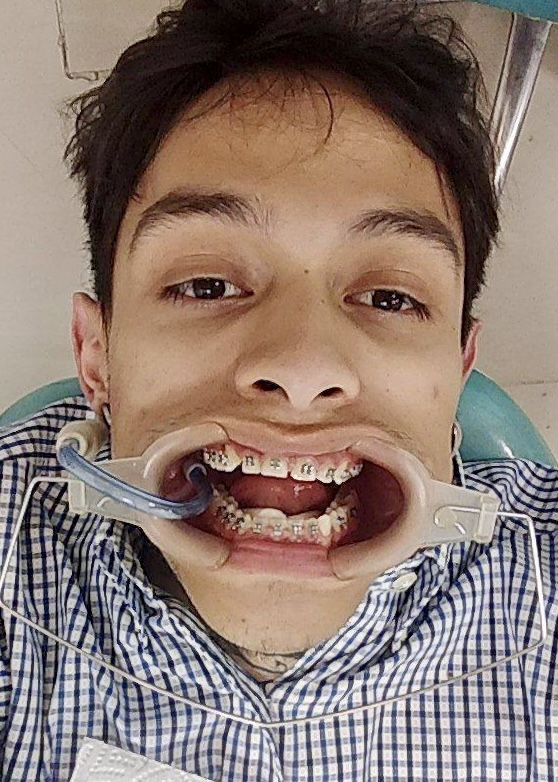
Young Colombian man during an adjustment visit for his orthodontics

Braces are typically adjusted every three to six weeks. This helps shift the teeth into the correct position. When they get adjusted, the orthodontist removes the coloured or metal ligatures keeping the arch wire in place. The arch wire is then removed and may be replaced or modified. When the archwire has been placed back into the mouth, the patient may choose a colour for the new elastic ligatures, which are then affixed to the metal brackets. The adjusting process may cause some discomfort to the patient, which is normal.

== Post-treatment ==
Patients may need post-orthodontic surgery, such as a fiberotomy or alternatively a gum lift, to prepare their teeth for retainer use and improve the gumline contours after the braces come off. After braces treatment, patients can use a transparent plate to keep the teeth in alignment for a certain period of time. After treatment, patients usually use transparent plates for 6 months. In patients with long and difficult treatment, a fixative wire is attached to the back of the teeth to prevent the teeth from returning to their original state.

=== Retainers ===
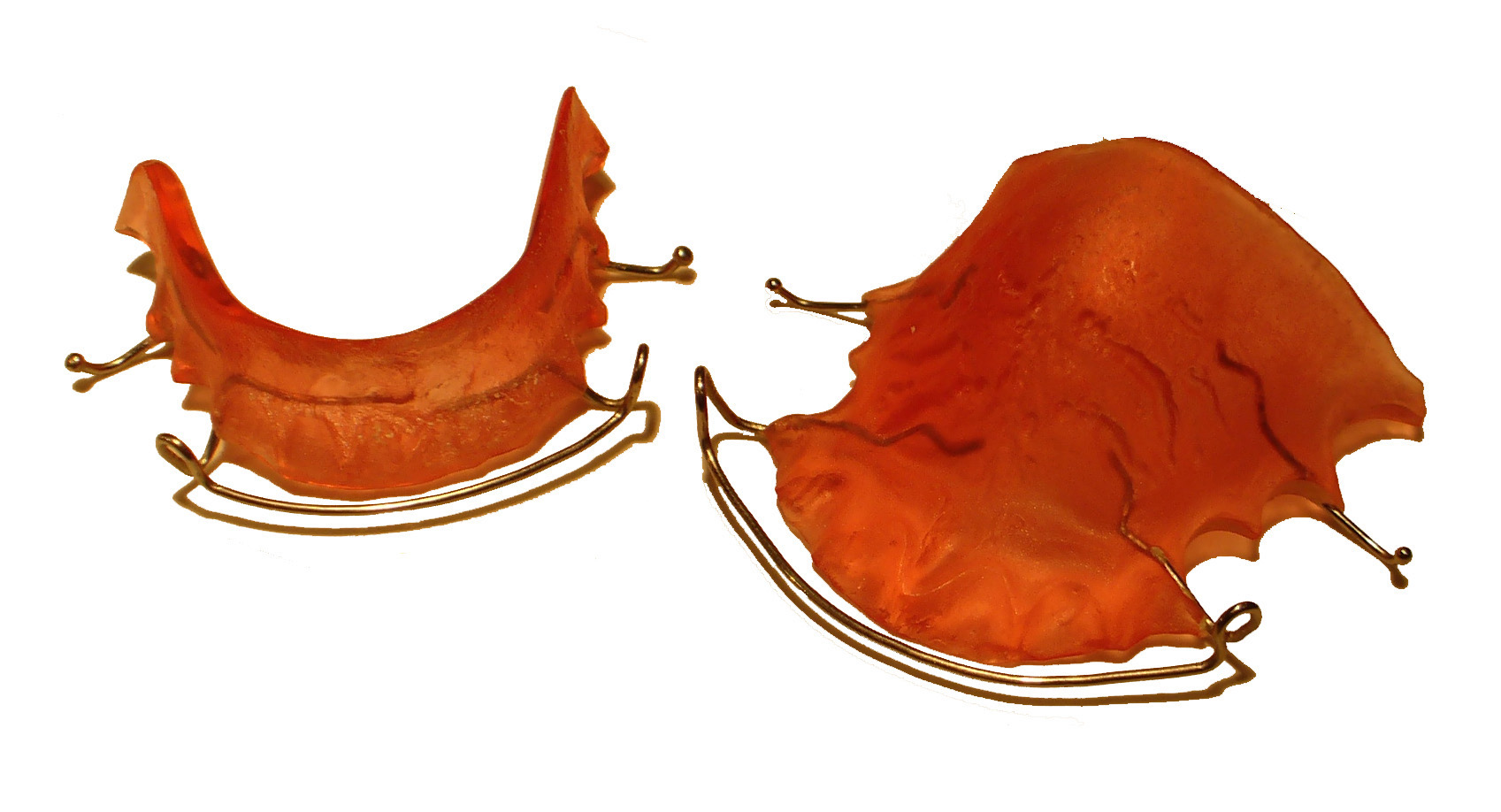
Hawley retainers are the most common type of retainers. This picture shows retainers for the top (right) and bottom (left) of the mouth.

In order to prevent the teeth from moving back to their original position, retainers are worn once the treatment is complete. Retainers help in maintaining and stabilizing the position of teeth long enough to permit the reorganization of the supporting structures after the active phase of orthodontic therapy. If the patient does not wear the retainer appropriately and/or for the right amount of time, the teeth may move towards their previous position. For regular braces, Hawley retainers are used. They are made of metal hooks that surround the teeth and are enclosed by an acrylic plate shaped to fit the patient's palate. For Clear Removable braces, an Essix retainer is used. This is similar to the original aligner; it is a clear plastic tray that is firmly fitted to the teeth and stays in place without a plate fitted to the palate. There is also a bonded retainer where a wire is permanently bonded to the lingual side of the teeth, usually the lower teeth only.

=== Headgear ===
Headgear needs to be worn between 12 and 22 hours each day to be effective in correcting the overbite, typically for 12 to 18 months depending on the severity of the overbite, how much it is worn and what growth stage the patient is in. Typically the prescribed daily wear time will be between 14 and 16 hours a day and is frequently used as a post-primary treatment phase to maintain the position of the jaw and arch. Headgear can be used during the night while the patient sleeps.

Orthodontic headgear usually consists of three major components:

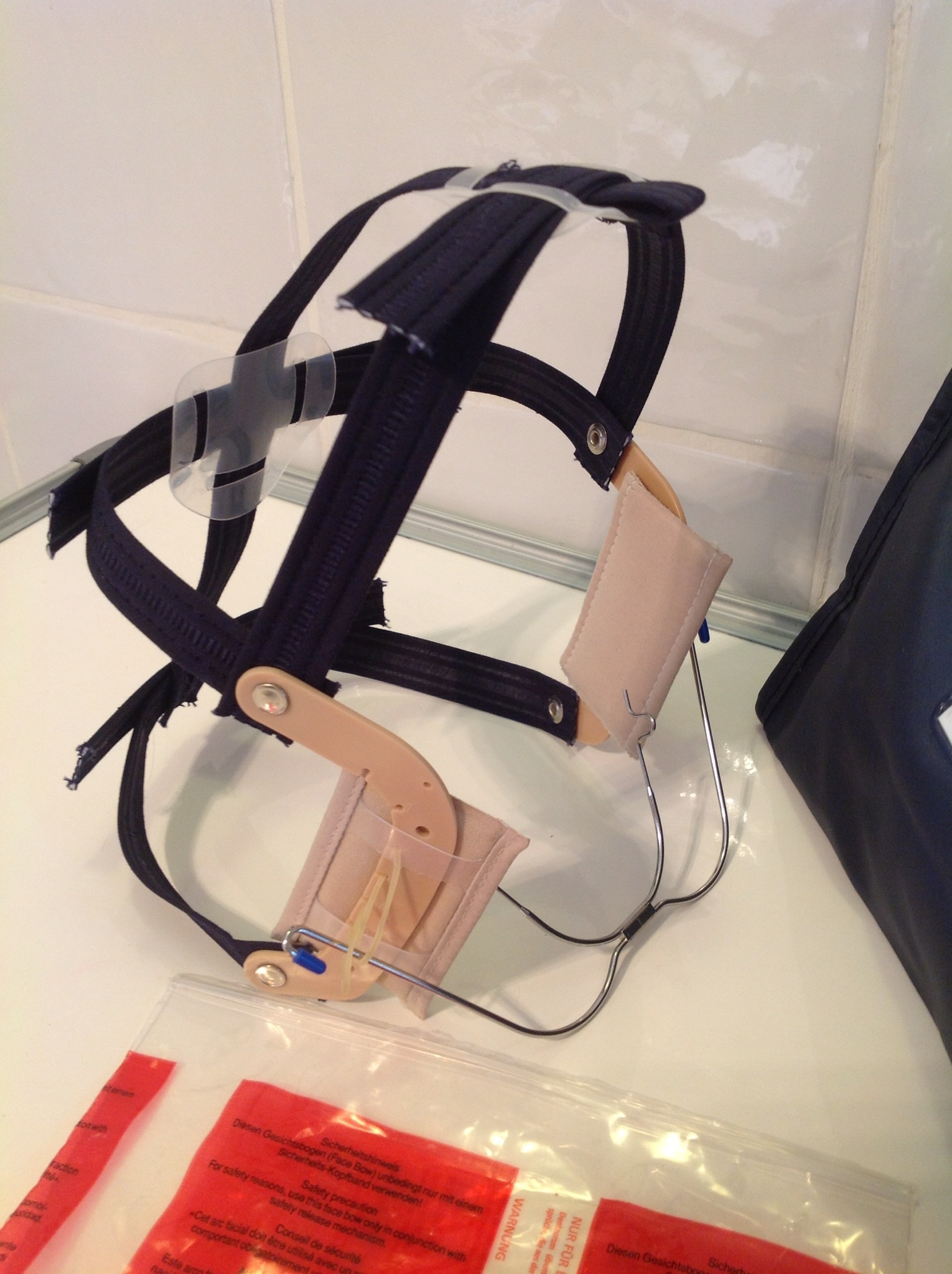
Full orthodontic headgear with head cap, fitting straps, facebow and elastics

1. Facebow: the facebow (or J-Hooks) is fitted with a metal arch onto headgear tubes attached to the rear upper and lower molars. This facebow then extends out of the mouth and around the patient's face. J-Hooks are different in that they hook into the patient's mouth and attach directly to the brace (see photo for an example of J-Hooks).
2. Head cap: the head cap typically consists of one or a number of straps fitting around the patient's head. This is attached with elastic bands or springs to the facebow. Additional straps and attachments are used to ensure comfort and safety (see photo).
3. Attachment: typically consisting of rubber bands, elastics, or springs—joins the facebow or J-Hooks and the head cap together, providing the force to move the upper teeth, jaw backwards.

The headgear application is one of the most useful appliances available to the orthodontist when looking to correct a Class II malocclusion. See more details in the section Orthodontic headgear.

=== Pre-finisher ===
The pre-finisher is moulded to the patient's teeth by use of extreme pressure on the appliance by the person's jaw. The product is then worn a certain amount of time with the user applying force to the appliance in their mouth for 10 to 15 seconds at a time. The goal of the process is to increase the exercise time in applying the force to the appliance. If a person's teeth are not ready for a proper retainer the orthodontist may prescribe the use of a preformed finishing appliance such as the pre-finisher. This appliance fixes gaps between the teeth, small spaces between the upper and lower jaw, and other minor problems.

== Complications and risks ==
A group of dental researchers, Fatma Boke, Cagri Gazioglu, Selvi Akkaya, and Murat Akkaya, conducted a study titled "Relationship between orthodontic treatment and gingival health." The results indicated that some orthodontic treatments result in gingivitis, also known as gum disease. The researchers concluded that functional appliances used to harness natural forces (such as improving the alignment of bites) do not usually have major effects on the gum after treatment. However, fixed appliances such as braces, which most people get, can result in visible plaque, visible inflammation, and gum recession in a majority of the patients. The formation of plaques around the teeth of patients with braces is almost inevitable regardless of plaque control and can result in mild gingivitis. But if someone with braces does not clean their teeth carefully, plaques will form, leading to more severe gingivitis and gum recession.

Experiencing some pain following fitting and activation of fixed orthodontic braces is very common and several methods have been suggested to tackle this. Pain associated with orthodontic treatment increases in proportion to the amount of force that is applied to the teeth. When a force is applied to a tooth via a brace, there is a reduction in the blood supply to the fibres that attach the tooth to the surrounding bone. This reduction in blood supply results in inflammation and the release of several chemical factors, which stimulate the pain response. Orthodontic pain can be managed using pharmacological interventions, which involve the use of analgesics applied locally or systemically. These analgesics are divided into four main categories, including opioids, non-steroidal anti-inflammatory drugs (NSAIDs), paracetamol and local anesthesia. The first three of these analgesics are commonly taken systemically to reduce orthodontic pain.

A Cochrane Review in 2017 evaluated the pharmacological interventions for pain relief during orthodontic treatment. The study concluded that there was moderate-quality evidence that analgesics reduce the pain associated with orthodontic treatment. However, due to a lack of evidence, it was unclear whether systemic NSAIDs were more effective than paracetamol, and whether topical NSAIDs were more effective than local anaesthesia in the reduction of pain associated with orthodontic treatment. More high-quality research is required to investigate these particular comparisons.

The dental displacement obtained with the orthodontic appliance determines in most cases some degree of root resorption. Only in a few cases is this side effect large enough to be considered real clinical damage to the tooth. In rare cases, the teeth may fall out or have to be extracted due to root resorption.

== History ==
=== Ancient ===
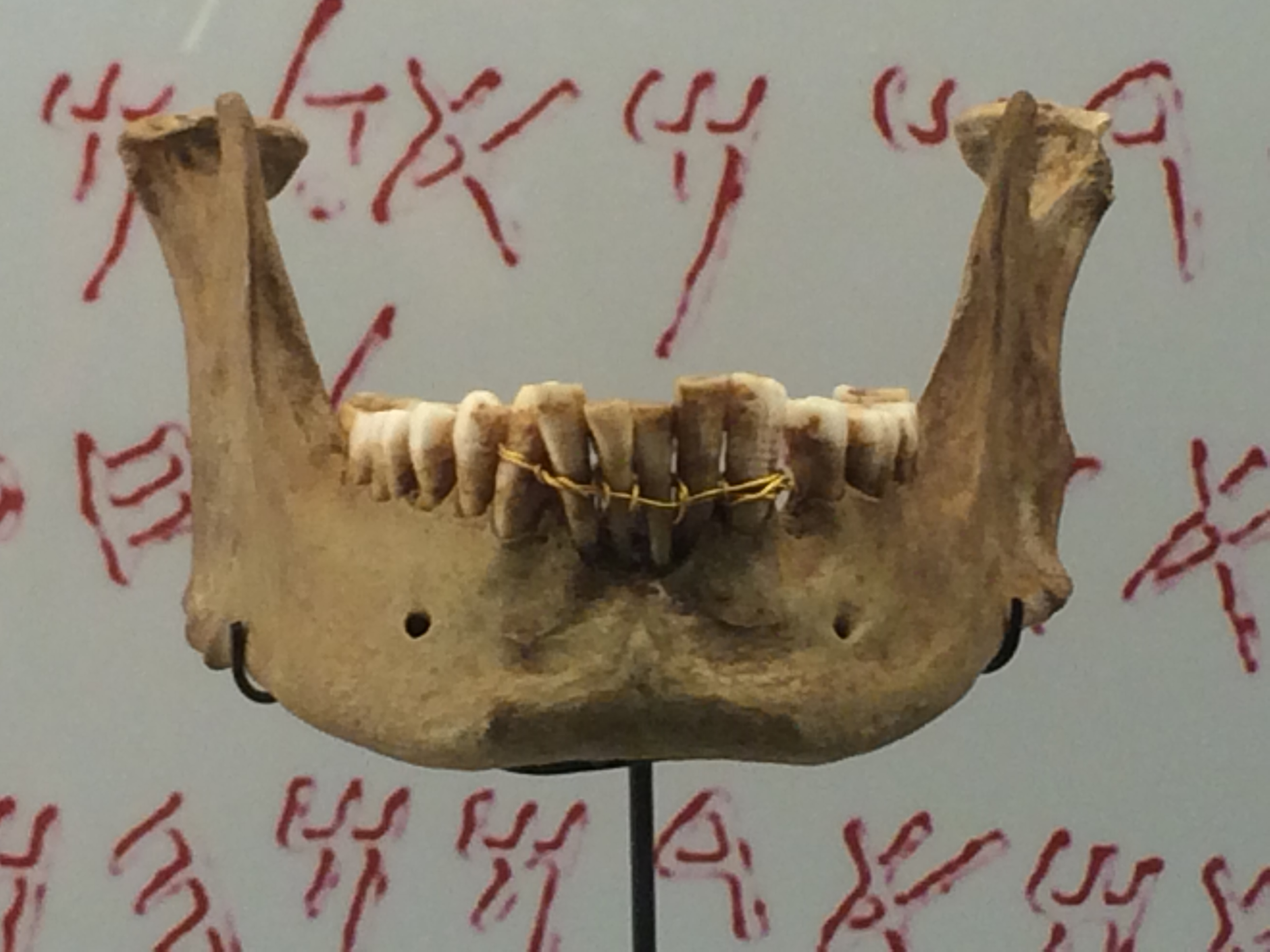
Old Braces at a museum in Jbeil, Lebanon

Around 400–300 BC, Hippocrates and Aristotle contemplated ways to straighten teeth and fix various dental conditions. Archaeologists have discovered numerous mummified ancient individuals with what appear to be metal bands wrapped around their teeth. Catgut, a type of cord made from the natural fibres of an animal's intestines, performed a similar role to today's orthodontic wire in closing gaps in the teeth and mouth.

The Etruscans buried their dead with dental appliances in place to maintain space and prevent the collapse of the teeth during the afterlife. A Roman tomb was found with a number of teeth bound with gold wire documented as a ligature wire, a small elastic wire that is used to affix the arch wire to the bracket. Even Cleopatra wore a pair. Roman philosopher and physician Aulus Cornelius Celsus first recorded the treatment of teeth by finger pressure. Unfortunately, due to a lack of evidence, poor preservation of bodies, and primitive technology, little research was carried out on dental braces until around the 17th century, although dentistry was making great advancements as a profession by then.

=== 18th century ===
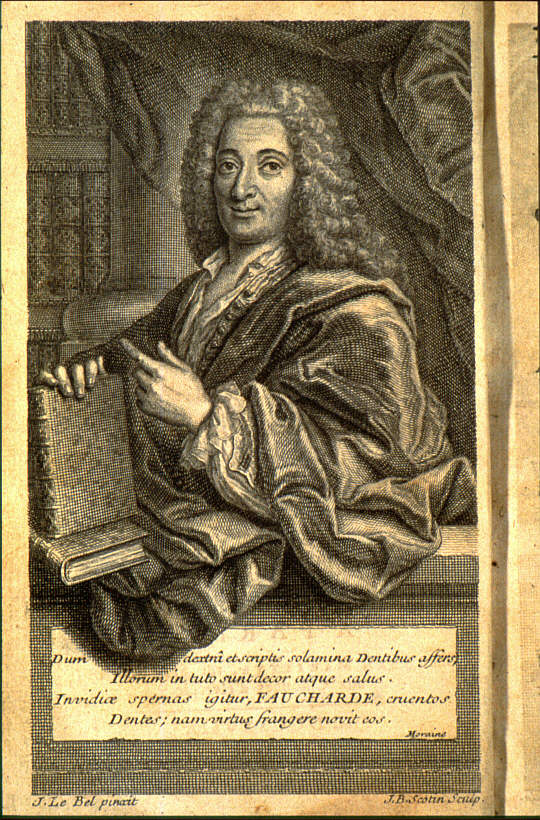
Portrait of Fauchard from his 1728 edition of "The Surgical Dentist".

Orthodontics truly began developing in the 18th and 19th centuries. In 1728, French dentist Pierre Fauchard, who is often credited with inventing modern orthodontics, published a book entitled "The Surgeon Dentist" on methods of straightening teeth. Fauchard, in his practice, used a device called a "Bandeau", a horseshoe-shaped piece of iron that helped expand the palate. In 1754, another French dentist, Louis Bourdet, dentist to the King of France, followed Fauchard's book with The Dentist's Art, which also dedicated a chapter to tooth alignment and application. He perfected the "Bandeau" and was the first dentist on record to recommend extraction of the premolar teeth to alleviate crowding and improve jaw growth.

=== 19th century ===
Although teeth and palate straightening and/or pulling were used to improve the alignment of remaining teeth and had been practised since early times, orthodontics, as a science of its own, did not really exist until the mid-19th century. Several important dentists helped to advance dental braces with specific instruments and tools that allowed braces to be improved.

In 1819, Christophe François Delabarre introduced the wire crib, which marked the birth of contemporary orthodontics, and gum elastics were first employed by Maynard in 1843. Tucker was the first to cut rubber bands from rubber tubing in 1850. Dentist, writer, artist, and sculptor Norman William Kingsley in 1858 wrote the first article on orthodontics and in 1880, his book, Treatise on Oral Deformities, was published. A dentist named John Nutting Farrar is credited for writing two volumes entitled, A Treatise on the Irregularities of the Teeth and Their Corrections and was the first to suggest the use of mild force at timed intervals to move teeth.

=== 20th century ===
In the early 20th century, Edward Angle devised the first simple classification system for malocclusions, such as Class I, Class II, and so on. His classification system is still used today as a way for dentists to describe how crooked teeth are, what way teeth are pointing, and how teeth fit together. Angle contributed greatly to the design of orthodontic and dental appliances, making many simplifications. He founded the first school and college of orthodontics, organized the American Society of Orthodontia in 1901 which became the American Association of Orthodontists (AAO) in the 1930s, and founded the first orthodontic journal in 1907. Other innovations in orthodontics in the late 19th and early 20th centuries included the first textbook on orthodontics for children, published by J.J. Guilford in 1889, and the use of rubber elastics, pioneered by Calvin S. Case, along with Henry Albert Baker.

Today, space age wires (also known as dental arch wires) are used to tighten braces. In 1959, the Naval Ordnance Laboratory created an alloy of nickel and titanium called Nitinol. NASA further studied the material's physical properties. In 1979, Dr. George Andreasen developed a new method of fixing braces with the use of the Nitinol wires based on their superelasticity. Andreasen used the wire on some patients and later found out that he could use it for the entire treatment. Andreasen then began using the nitinol wires for all his treatments and as a result, dental doctor visits were reduced, the cost of dental treatment was reduced, and patients reported less discomfort.

== See also ==
- Mandibular advancement splint
- Oral and maxillofacial surgery
- Orthognathic surgery
- Prosthodontics
- Trismus
- Dental implant
