= Lingual braces =

Orthodontic treatment appliance

Lingual braces are one of the many types of the fixed orthodontic treatment appliances available to patients needing orthodontics. They involve attaching the orthodontic brackets on the inner (lingual vs. buccal) sides of the teeth. The main advantage of lingual braces is their near invisibility compared to the standard braces, which are attached on the buccal (cheek) sides of the tooth. Lingual braces were invented by Craven Kurz in 1976.

== History ==
Craven Kurz with Jim Mulick in 1975 developed the Cruz Lingual Appliances in the United States. The first patient to be treated by lingual braces was by Kurz in Beverly Hills in 1976. She was a member of Playboy Bunny Club and after being presented with metal braces option, she wanted to get braces which did not show metal. It was from her demand that Craven developed the lingual braces. Craven consulted with Dr. Jim Mulick at UCLA School of Dentistry after which this appliance was developed. Craven's practice was dominated by adult patients, many of whom were celebrities. Initial problems faced by Craven included irritation caused by appliance to tongue and patient's speech problems. Additionally, there was a higher rate of brackets being broken due to lower teeth touching upper brackets.

Eventually, a dental company named Ormco started developing lingual brackets in conjunction with Dr. Kurz. After working on several prototypes of brackets initially, the company also faced same problems: Irritation caused to the tongue and high bracket failure rate. Then, an inclined plane was added to the lingual brackets and the company saw lower failure rates. This plane allowed the shearing forces to convert into compressive forces. After the development of the inclined plane, Kurz filed for a patent in 1976. The first brackets to be produced were in 1979 by Ormco. Kurz eventually started working with the orthodontic company Ormco to develop his next 7 generations of the lingual bracket. Initial patients were seen at private practice of Kurz where the brackets were directly bonded, as compared to indirect bonding with majority of the lingual braces. Eventually, Dr. Kurz lectured to many orthodontists around US and showed his cases to the other clinicians. In the early 1980s, the interest with lingual braces started to gather steam as other companies such as Unitek, Forestadent started to develop their own groups to study these appliances.

The first organization to form around lingual braces was Société Française d'Orthodontie Linguale or French Orthodontic Society for Lingual Orthodontics in 1986. American Lingual Orthodontic Association was also established in 1987 and they had their first meeting in Washington that year. Dental Lingual Assistant Association was also formed around the same time. Europe saw its first lingual organization formed named The European Society of Lingual Orthodontics (ESLO) in 1992. This was followed by more societies being formed across Europe and Asia, including the British Lingual Orthodontic Society (BLOS), founded in 2003. Among BLOS's founding members was Dr Asif Chatoo, who in 2005 established The London Lingual Orthodontic Clinic on Harley Street – the first practice in the UK dedicated exclusively to lingual orthodontics. Lingual braces had been introduced to many doctors across Europe during this period, though growing reports of clinical difficulties saw their popularity decline by 1989. Improved laboratory techniques and advances in digital technology – including customised bracket systems and robotically bent wires – brought about a resurgence in lingual orthodontics from around 2008.

=== Generation ===
Below are listed generations of the Ormco brackets that were created between 1976 and late 1980s.

1. Generation #1 - This was the original appliance that Craven made with Ormco in 1976. The initial appliance included low profile brackets, maxillary occlusal plane on the upper brackets. These brackets did not have hooks on the brackets.
2. Generation #2 - In this generation, hooks on canines were added in the year 1980.
3. Generation #3 - All premolar and anterior brackets received hooks in 1982.
4. Generation # 4 - The anterior inclined plane was made to be more of low profile in this generation, and at this point due to concerns of gingival impingement from the hooks of brackets, they were made to be optional by the company.
5. Generation # 5 - In 1985, this generation received more torque values for the maxillary incisors, and the company increased the size of the anterior inclined plane.
6. Generation #6 - In 1988, this generation saw a transpalatal bar hook being added to the molar brackets and the inclined plane on the anterior brackets became more of square shape.
7. Generation #7 - This last generation the inclined plane was made to be heart shaped. Hooks were made longer to allow easier ligation of the elastic o rings. The premolar brackets were also widened mesio-distally.

== Design ==
Brackets were initially bonded with a system known as Torque Angulation Referencing Guide (TARG) which allowed a clinician to place brackets on lingual surfaces of teeth by using the natural anatomy. Then another method called Custom Lingual Appliance Set-Up Service which allowed a clinician to set up brackets on a model first and then indirectly bond them on patient's teeth later on with a tray.Evolution of Lingual Self-ligating brackets

In 1999, use of self-ligating brackets in lingual orthodontics was first presented by Neumann and Holtgräve who suggested the use of SPEED (Strite Industries Ltd.) self- ligating labial brackets for application in the lingual technique.

Dr. Lawrence Andrews invented the Straightwire Appliance in the 1970s. This allowed values of tip and torque to be incorporated into the brackets. When developing the lingual brackets, Craven used reciprocal tip and torque values of that of Lawrence Andrew's straightwire appliance for each tooth in his lingual brackets. Eventually first order bend at the junction of the canine and premolar, and the premolar and molar were placed in the wires as these values were not incorporated in the brackets.

=== Advantages ===
An advantage of the lingual brackets over the buccal brackets is the less decalcification marks on the buccal side of the teeth which is more visible to the naked eye. Patients with poor oral hygiene can have increased white spot lesions which present themselves buccally and can stay there post-orthodontically if proper oral hygiene is not maintained.

=== Disadvantages ===
Initial appliances formed in 1980s irritated patient's tongues and had higher breakage rate. However, different companies made the bracket profile smaller and smoother which allowed less irritation to soft tissues around the bracket. However, the same problems still persisted over the years and treatment approach presently is to inform the patient that irritation and speech impairment will improve in 2–3 weeks after the bracket placement.

A systematic review and a meta-analysis published in 2016 stated that lingual braces cause greater amount of pain in tongue, problem maintaining oral hygiene and problems with speech and eating difficulties.

== Treatment effects ==
=== Intrusion of anterior teeth ===
Lingual brackets are located more closely to the center of resistance of a tooth than brackets placed on a buccal surface of a tooth. Thus when a patient bites down, the biting forces are directed through the center of resistance of those anterior teeth. Thus the light continuous forces directed towards the upper lingual brackets may induce slight intrusion of the upper anterior teeth. However, forces that are felt on the anterior teeth seem to be minimal, in milligrams. An optimum force needed to intrude teeth is 30-40g.

=== Bite plane effect ===
As the mandibular teeth are biting on the upper brackets, it results in an anterior bite plane effect. This eventually leads to the light, continuous intruding force that is being felt on the front incisors. This bite plane effect may also induce slight opening in the posterior molar teeth and these teeth may extrude, leading to correction of deep bite or worsening of an already open bite. This can worsen a Class 2 malocclusion as mandible rotates down and back, leading to more of a Class 2 molar relationship.

=== Small interbracket distance ===
Due to the small interbracket distance in the lingual braces, compare to the buccal braces, compensatory bends which can be made in finishing phase are tough to create. The distance between brackets anteriorly in lingual braces is about 40% smaller than the buccal braces. Despite the bends, making loops to close spaces also becomes mechanically tough.

=== Bowing effects ===
Lingual orthodontics is known to have both vertical and horizontal bowing effects during space closure. These effects are related to in terms of closing spaces on an archwire which may not fill the slot completely. Therefore, increased play in the wire to bracket relationship can cause effects which may lead to more of a tipping tooth movement than pure translation, as desired in most cases. These effects can be counteracted by either placing anti-bowing effect curves both vertically and horizontally, by using lighter retraction forces or by steel-ligation of posterior teeth as a unit to prevent the side-effects.

== Types ==
Lingual braces and wires are made by many different of companies. Some of them are Incognito (3M), ALIAS (Ormco), Innovation L (Dentsply/GAC International), eBrace (Riton BioMaterials), Stb Light (Ormco) and Harmony (American Orthodontics).

=== Incognito ===
Incognito lingual brackets and wires are made by 3M in Germany. These appliances were initially designed by Dirk Wiechmann. He published his results in 2003 in American Journal of Orthodontics and Dentofacial Orthopedics, where he reported testing these appliances for 18 months on 600 bonded arches on patients in his private practice. The company uses a CAD/CAM technology to combine bracket fabrication and bracket positioning which is done on computer models. The wires and brackets are customized to each patient's anatomy of the lingual tooth surface. The bases of these brackets are bigger than other brackets produced by different companies, however these appliances have thinner bracket base and use less bonding material than other brackets. This may be seen as an advantage by some due to low profile of brackets which may cause less irritation to the tongue of patients, but this does lead to creating 1st order bends in the wires to compensate for the low profile of these brackets. A study done in Germany in 2005 compared the pre-adjusted lingual brackets (Ormco) to customized lingual brackets (Incognito) on a group of 40 German-speaking women. The results stated that customized brackets in the study induced significantly fewer cases of tongue space restriction, pressure sores, reddening or lesions to the tongue in the long term than the pre-fabricated brackets. Even though the results favor the Incognito appliance, it should be kept in mind that this is a subjective opinion of people which may confound the results.
