= Intrusion (orthodontics) =

Movement of a tooth into bone

Intrusion is a movement in the field of orthodontics where a tooth is moved partially into the bone. Intrusion is done in orthodontics to correct an anterior deep bite or in some cases intrusion of the over-erupted posterior teeth with no opposing tooth. Intrusion can be done in many ways and consists of many different types. Intrusion, in orthodontic history, was initially defined as problematic in early 1900s and was known to cause periodontal effects such as root resorption and recession. However, in mid 1950s successful intrusion with light continuous forces was demonstrated. Charles J. Burstone defined intrusion to be "the apical movement of the geometric center of the root (centroid) in respect to the occlusal plane or plane based on the long axis of tooth".

== Types ==
=== True Intrusion ===
This type of intrusion consists of true intrusion of incisors without any extrusion of the posterior teeth. The incisors in the anterior teeth (depending on the arch) move towards the bone and no movement of posterior teeth is seen in comparison with relative intrusion where posterior teeth erupt out of the bone. A light continuous force is known to achieve true intrusion. True intrusion can be done with methods such as Burstonian segmental arch mechanics or the use of TADs anteriorly.

=== Relative Intrusion ===
This type of intrusion consists of extrusion of posterior teeth to correct the deep bite. The anterior incisors do not move up or down in this type of intrusion. Relative intrusion can be done with various methods such as using a reverse curve of spee wires, anterior bite blocks, differential molar eruption with functional appliances such as Twin Block Appliance. This type of movement can be performed in patients who are adolescents and have deep bite tendency.

== Methods ==
=== Intrusion Arch ===
Two orthodontic techniques have been developed for the purpose of intrusion of anterior teeth. They are intruding the teeth segmentally, as proposed by Dr. Charles J. Burstone or intruding the teeth through the bioprogressive techniques.

==== Burstone's Intrusion arch ====
This method was proposed by Dr. Burstone in 1950s. This segmental arch method used two posterior segments and one anterior segment. A separate continuous intrusion arch is used which was inserted in the auxiliary tube of molars on one end and tied to the anterior segment on the other end. The molars served as an anchorage for the intrusion arch while the pure intrusion was achieved via downward force on the anterior segment where the intrusion arch was engaged. Dr. Burstone also believed in using low magnitude forces to achieve the desired intrusion.

This type of intrusion has a single point of application of force system which allows one to devise what type of force is being generated. This type of system is known as Statistically determinate system.

==== Rickett's Utility intrusion arch ====
Robert M. Ricketts developed the Utility arch in 1950s and it is considered to be an integral part of the Bioprogressive Therapy in Orthodontics. His utility arch is a continuous wire that is engaged in a posterior 1st permanent molar tooth and front four incisors. His utility arch consists of 5 segments: Molar segments, Posterior Vertical Segment, Vestibular segment, anterior vertical segment and incisal segment. The incisal segment lies passively in the incisal brackets of the anterior teeth. This type of intrusion arch employs a statistically indeterminate system.

Activation of the intrusion arch is done by placing occlusally pointed gable bend at the posterior portion of the vestibular segment. This allows the anterior portion of the wire to passively sit in the vestibule and when engaged in the anterior teeth, puts forces on the incisors.

==== Three-Piece intrusion arch ====
This type of intrusion arch was developed by Shroff et al. in 1992. This arch also has 3 segments in one arch. The anterior segment has a vertical bend distal to the lateral incisors with a posterior extension to which the intrusion cantilever springs are engaged bilaterally. This type of intrusion was developed to achieve retraction and intrusion simultaneously in a treatment where upper first premolars are extraction. The retraction can be performed by using either an elastomeric chain or Niti Coil Spring which connects the distal extension of the anterior segment and the hook on the posterior molar tube.

Activation of the cantilever is done by making a bend mesial to the molar tube which allows the intrusion arch to be in vestibule when it's passive.

== Type of cases ==
An orthodontic patient can present with different types of malocclusion and facial growth patterns. Intrusion of teeth can be used in patients with deep bite cases who may have a vertical or a horizontal growth pattern or open bite cases which may involve intrusion of posterior teeth.

=== Deep bite with vertical facial growth pattern ===
In these types of cases, it is essential to manage the vertical growth of a patient. Managing vertical growth requires further prevention or increase of the lower facial height. This involves prevention of any eruption of posterior molars because their eruption would lead to mandible moving downwards and backwards which would cause worsening of a Class II malocclusion and increase in the lower facial height. These types of patients must have intrusion of the incisors to achieve desired correction of anterior deep bite in conjunction with prevention of any eruption of posterior molars which maintains the vertical height of the patient.

=== Deep bite with horizontal facial growth pattern ===
In these types of cases, a patient has reduced anterior lower facial height and they have a skeletal deep bite tendency. It is essential in these types of patients, to increase the vertical height of the face and one of the most common ways this can be performed is through relative intrusion. This movement involves extrusion of the posterior molars and is sometimes combined with intrusion of anterior incisors.

Age plays a role in eruption of the posterior molars. An adolescent has an inter-maxillary growth space which allows the posterior molar eruption without any relapse in the later age when relative intrusion is performed in their orthodontic treatment. However, if relative intrusion is performed in adults who have a deep bite tendency with short anterior lower facial height, there is a higher chance of relapse of this movement. This is due to two reasons: Adults do not have intermaxillary growth space that posterior teeth can erupt into and adults tend to have a strong facial jaw musculature which leads to "pound" the molars back into their original position. Therefore, in an orthodontic treatment it is important to diagnose a patient with a type of facial growth that is occurring before taking any treatment steps.

== Major Principles of Intrusion ==
Dr. Charles Burstone in his 1977 paper discussed about six major principles to follow when working with intrusion mechanics

1. Controlling the force magnitude and consistency
2. Single point contacts on the anterior teeth
3. Point of force application & Center of Resistance
4. Selective Intrusion based on anterior tooth geometry
5. Control over the reactive unites by formation of a posterior anchorage unit
6. Inhibition of eruption of posterior teeth and avoidance of "extrusive" mechanics

== Force Magnitude ==
Force magnitude in pure intrusion of incisors must be constant throughout the application. A high force magnitude would not result in higher magnitude of intrusion. In order to achieve low magnitude for pure intrusion, a wire with low load-deflection rate should be used.

Higher force can result in various side-effects on teeth and are listed below

- Increased rate of root resorption
- Rate of intrusion does not increase with increased force
- Extrusion of the posterior teeth
- Steepening of upper arch plane of occlusion
- Flattening of lower arch plane of occlusion

Another concept of force that is critical in understanding the concept of intrusion mechanics is that equal and opposite forces are produced at incisors and at molars. For example, a 40g force that's acting to intrude the lower incisors is being counteracted by 40g of force being produced to extrude the posterior molars where the other end of intrusion arch is being engaged. Thus it is important to use a wire that has a low load-deflection rate which gives a constant force of intrusion on the teeth and prevents the side-effect.

Many different orthodontists have suggested forces that may be ideal for intrusion. 1978, Bench et al. suggested an intrusive force of 15-20g per lower incisor and 60-80g for all four lower incisors. Liu et al. proposed in 1981 to use force of 100g for all four incisors.

== Side-effects ==
Whether using segmental or continuous arch method, side-effects are still observed when intruding teeth.

=== Incisal flaring ===
When using intrusion arch which is normally has its point of application buccal to center of resistance, a counter-clockwise moment will be observed at the center of resistance which will move the crown labial and root lingual. This will lead to flaring of the incisors where crown will move buccally/facially and root will move lingually. The greater the distance of the bracket from the center of resistance of a tooth, the greater the moment observed to top the incisors buccally. This may appear as intrusion but is called a pseudo-intrusion where the teeth are being tipped and not translated apically through the bone. In cases such as extraction cases where space closure is desired, retraction of incisors to correct its inclination can be first achieved and then intrusion applied when the incisors are upright. Another way to control the side-effect is to do intrusion-retraction which simultaneously achieves space closure but also prevents the dumping of the incisors.

=== Lingual crown tip on molars ===
A certain intrusive force acting on the incisors is counter-acted by an opposite and equal extrusive force acting at the posterior teeth of the same arch. The extrusive force is felt at buccal of the center of resistance of a molar tooth because the bracket slot in the molar tube or band lies buccal to the tooth. Thus, there is a moment that is produced that leads to lingual crown tip and buccal root tip of that molar tooth. This effect can be dealt by using a Lower Lingual Holding arch or a Transpalatal Arch to control the transverse side-effects.

== One-couple vs. Two-couple System ==
In a one-couple system there is a single point of application of force system which allows one to devise what type of force is being generated. For example, in a segmental intrusion arch, the arch is tied to a base archwire anteriorly and engaged into a tube in the posterior molar. This produces only a force in the anterior but a force and a couple in the posterior at the molar. Thus a couple is generated only at one end of the intrusion arch and thus this type of system is known to be one-couple system which can be statistically determinate.

If the intrusion arch in engaged in the slots of the anterior brackets and at the tube in the posterior teeth, then a two-point contact system is generated which prevents the clinician from determining what type of forces are being generated clinically. This type of system is known as statistically indeterminate system and can be seen with intrusion arches such as Rickett's Utility intrusion arch.

== See also ==
- Malocclusion
- Open bite malocclusion
- Charles J. Burstone
