= Curve of Spee =

Anatomical curvature in human skull

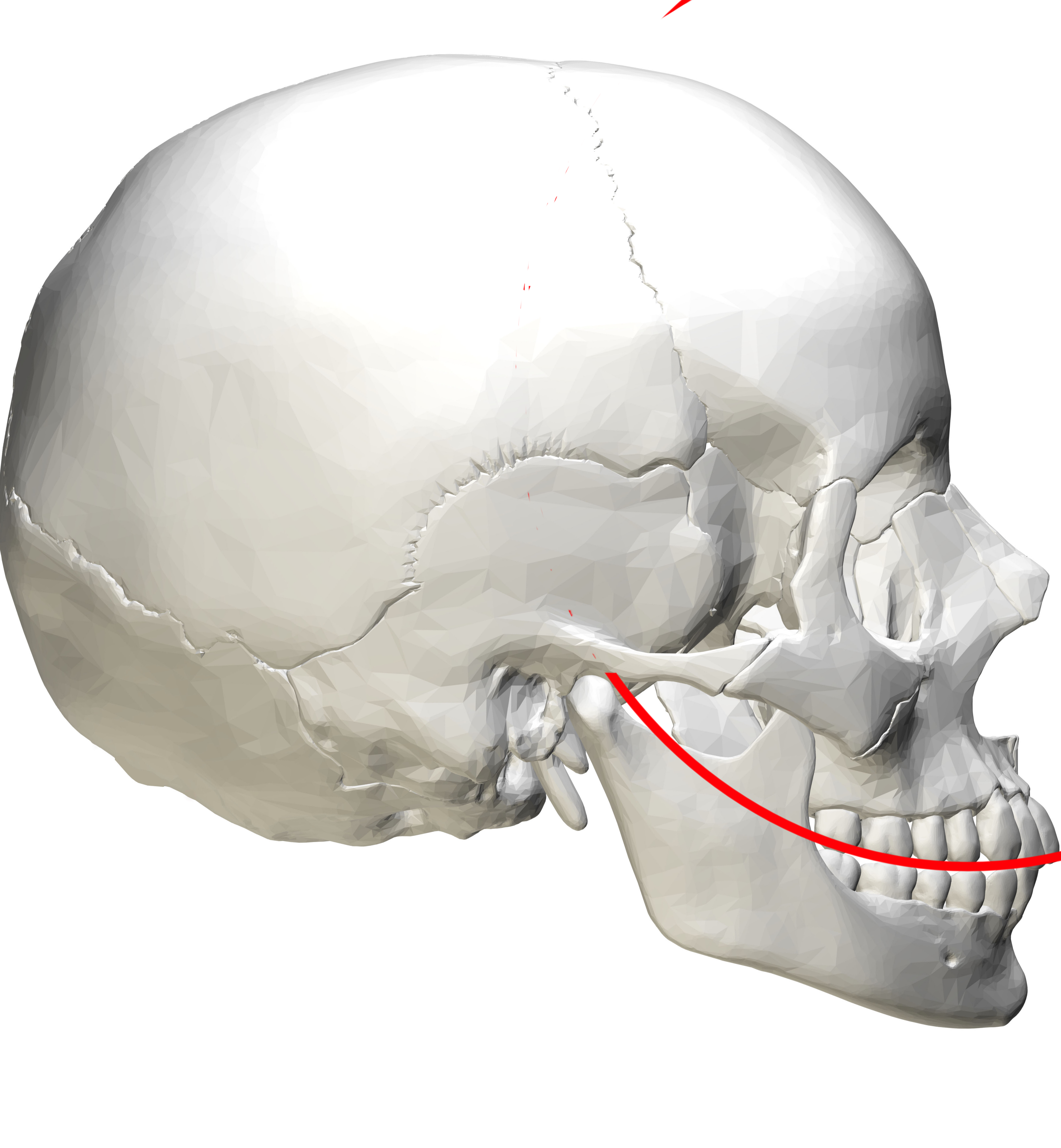
Curve of Spee

In anatomy, the Curve of Spee (also called von Spee's curve or Spee's curvature) is defined as the curvature of the mandibular occlusal plane beginning at the canine and following the buccal cusps of the posterior teeth, continuing to the terminal molar. According to another definition the curve of Spee is an anatomic curvature of the occlusal alignment of the teeth, beginning at the tip of the lower incisor, following the buccal cusps of the natural premolars, and molars and continuing to the anterior border of the ramus. It is named for the German embryologist Ferdinand Graf von Spee (1855–1937), who was first to describe the anatomic relations of human teeth in the sagittal plane.

== Details ==
The pull of the main muscle of mastication, the masseter, is at a perpendicular angle with the curve of Spee to adapt for favorable loading of force on the teeth. The long axis of each lower tooth is aligned nearly parallel to their individual arch of closure. The Curve of Spee is, essentially, a series of sloped contact points. It is of importance to orthodontists as it may contribute to an increased overbite. A flat or mild curve of Spee was essential to an ideal occlusion.

The Curve of Spee is distinct from the Curve of Wilson, which is the upward (U-shaped) curvature of the maxillary and mandibular occlusal planes in the coronal plane.

The Curve of Spee is basically a part of a circle (8-inch diameter) which has its circumference as the anterior ramus of mandible. Ideally, it is aligned so that a continuation of this arc would extend through the condyles. The curvature of this arc would relate, on average, to part of a circle with a 4-inch radius. It is the only Anteroposterior curve of occlusion.

== See also ==
- Intrusion (orthodontics)
