= Ravindra Nanda =

Chair, Department of Craniofacial Sciences

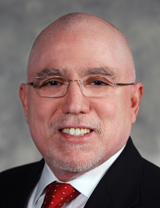
- Prof. Ravindra Nanda
- Born: 19 February 1943 (age 83); Lyallpur, British India
- Education: Master of Dental Surgery (1964), PhD (1970), Certificate in Orthodontics (1978)
- Alma mater: King George's Medical College Lucknow University, Katholieke Universities (Nijmegen, the Netherlands), University of Connecticut
- Occupations: Professor and Head of the Department of Craniofacial Sciences, Chair Division of Orthodontics

Ravindra Nanda (born 19 February 1943) is a Professor Emeritus and former Head of the Department of Craniofacial Sciences and Chair of the Division of Orthodontics at the University of Connecticut School of Dental Medicine, having retired in 2018. He is part of the founding faculty of School of Dental Medicine and has been at the University of Connecticut since 1972, where he also holds an Alumni Chair in the Orthodontics Division. He is an innovator in the development of various appliances in orthodontics. His research and clinical interests include adolescent and adult orthodontics, the biology of tooth mobility, craniofacial orthopedics, biomechanics and developing efficient mechanics to deliver orthodontic care. In 2018, the Associated Press reported on a 2016 UConn Health investigation concerning allegations of disparaging remarks toward Muslim and Arab resident doctors; Nanda denied the allegations.

== Personal life ==
Dr. Nanda was born in Lyallpur, British India (presently Faisalabad, Pakistan) as the youngest of seven children but moved soon after the Partition of India. His father, a family physician, practiced for 30 years there. He has two brothers, Dr. Ram S. Nanda and Dr. Surender Nanda, who are orthodontists in the United States of America. Dr. Nanda did his Post Graduation in Orthodontics under his elder brother Dr. Ram S. Nanda, who was the head of department of orthodontics of King Georges Medical College, Lucknow University. He is married and current resides in Connecticut.

== Education ==
Ravindra Nanda received bachelor's and master's degrees in dentistry and orthodontics from King George's Medical College, Lucknow University. His thesis on "Cephalometric Study of the Dentofacial Complex of North Indians" was selected for the scholarship research grant from the Indian Council of Medical Research and was published in the January 1969 issue of the Angle Orthodontist. He joined Katholieke Universiteit, Nijmegen, the Netherlands in 1967 and received his PhD in Philosophy in 1969. Nanda came over to the new dental school at Loyola in Chicago in 1970, after serving as fellow and assistant professor in orthodontics with Frans van der Linden. In 1972, he advanced to the Department of Orthodontics, University of Connecticut in Farmington, CT, and received his certificate in orthodontics under Dr. Charles Burstone.

== Career ==
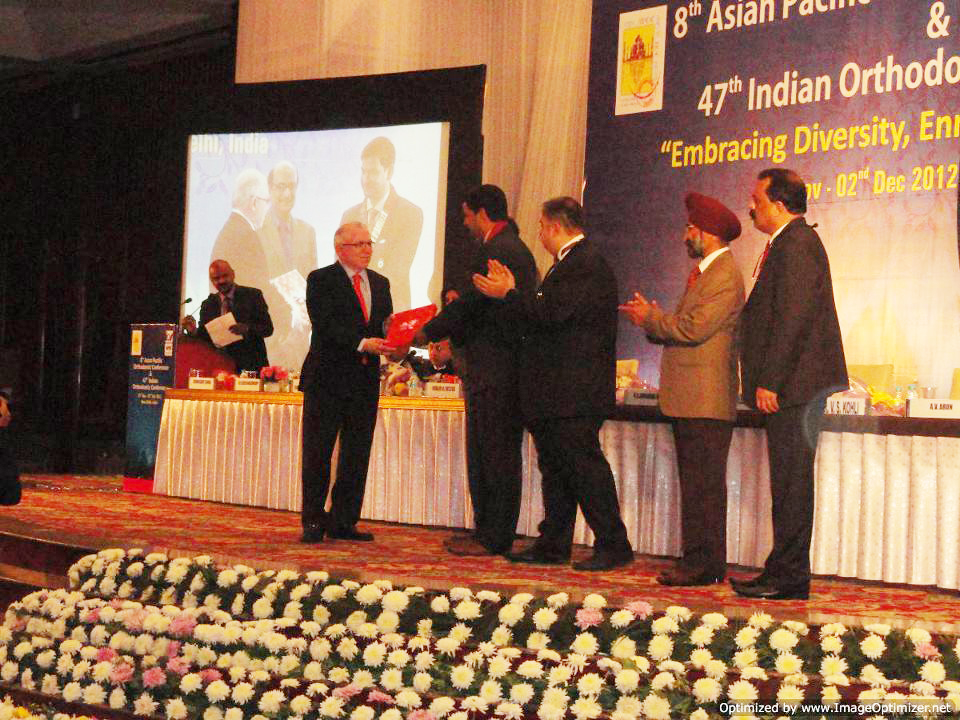
Nanda receiving Life membership of IOS

Nanda joined the University of Connecticut in 1972 after teaching two years at Loyola University in Maywood, IL. Over the last 39 years he moved from assistant professor to full professor in 1979. He assumed the position of Head of the Department of Orthodontics in 1992 and was promoted to lead the Department of Craniofacial Sciences in 2004, which include the divisions of Oral and Maxillofacial Surgery, Pediatric Dentistry, Advanced Education in General Dentistry, and Orthodontics.

Nanda is a member and past president of the North Atlantic component of the Edward H. Angle Society of Orthodontists. Currently, Nanda is the former editor-in-chief of Progress in Orthodontics, the associate editor of Journal of Clinical Orthodontics and on the editorial board of nine national and international orthodontic journals. In 2025, Nanda was named Editor-in-Chief Emeritus of Progress in Orthodontics following his tenure as editor-in-chief of the journal. He is a member of the American Dental Association, the Connecticut State Dental Association, the Hartford Dental Society, the American Association of Orthodontics, the European Orthodontic Society, the International Association of Dental Research, and the College of Diplomats of the American Board of Orthodontists He has authored and edited seven textbooks and more than 200 publications and peer-reviewed journals. He has given keynote lectures in more than 40 countries and has received awards and honors from U.S and international orthodontic organizations. Most recently Dr. Nanda was honored with a Life Time Membership to the Indian Orthodontic Society (IOS), at the 8th APOC in New Delhi, India.

== Allegations of discrimination ==
In January 2018, University of Connecticut Health's Office of Institutional Equity released a report finding that Nanda had violated UConn Health prohibitions against religious, race, and national origin discrimination, as well as retaliation. According to the investigation, which found the testimony of several resident doctors to be credible, Nanda called Arab and Muslim resident doctors members of the Islamic State and commented that the FBI might think he was building an "ISIS cell" due to the number of Arab and Muslim people in his program. The report also alleged that he only allowed North American residents to treat Caucasian patients and tossed out a job application from a female resident doctor.

The university documented that Nanda retaliated against residents who assisted in the investigation by reporting his discriminatory behavior. Investigator Ellen Keane recommended that UConn consider disciplining Nanda and take immediate measures "to protect residents against further discrimination, harassment and retaliation". However, Nanda had retired in fall 2017, more than a year after the Office of Institutional Equity issued its report, and the investigation had no bearing on his retiring. Nanda's lawyer Jacques Parenteau stated that Nanda appealed the report's findings and the process ended with a confidential resolution. Nanda has denied all accusations.

Following these findings, Nanda, who was described as "now-retired" in the reports, faced formal disciplinary action from UConn Health. In March 2018, additional university documents also accused Nanda and other UConn Health dentists of engaging in irregular discretionary billing practices for staff members, further compounding the disciplinary issues he faced.

== Awards and honors ==
Nanda has received numerous awards for his contributions in dentistry and orthodontics; the most notable include:

- Honorary Member - Jordan Orthodontic Society
- John Taylor Lecture, Australia - Australia Society of Orthodontics Foundation
- Sheldon Friel Memorial Lecture - European Orthodontic Society
- Keith Godfrey Visiting Professor, Sydney, Australia - University of Sydney
- Life Time Achievement Award - University of Connecticut Foundation
- John Mershon Memorial Lecture, Boston, Massachusetts - America Association of Orthodontics
- Honorary Member - Czech Orthodontic Society
- Honorary Member - Taiwanese Orthodontic Society
- Honorary Life Time Membership - Indian Orthodontic Society
- Gordon Kirkness Memorial Lecture - Australian Society of Orthodontics
- Honorary Member - Central American Orthodontics Society
- Wendell L. Wylie Memorial Lecture, San Francisco, California - University of San Francisco
- Senior Research Fellow, Japan Promotion for Science, Sendai, Japan - Tohoku University

== Publications ==
=== Textbooks ===
- Nanda, R. and Burstone, CJ (eds) Retention and Stability in Orthodontics WB Saunders Co, Philadelphia, PA, 1993.
- Nanda, R. Biomechanics in Clinical Orthodontics WB Saunders Co, Philadelphia, PA, 1996.
- Nanda, R. Biomechanic and Esthetic Strategies in Clinical Orthodontics. WB Saunders Co, Philadelphia, PA 2005.
- Nanda, R. Temporary Anchorage Devices in Orthodontics. Philadelphia: WB Saunders, 2008.
- Nanda, R. and Kapila, S. Current Therapy in Orthodontics, Mosby, St. Louis, April, 2009.
- Nanda, R. Esthetics and Biomechanics in Orthodontics, Saunders, St. Louis, MO, 2015.
- Nanda, R., Uribe, F. Atlas of Complex Orthodontics, Elsevier, St. Louis, MO, 2016.

=== Monographs and invited editorships ===
- Nanda, R The normal palate and induced cleft palate in rat embryos: An in vivo in vitro and autoradiographic study on embryological development. Gebr Janssen, Nymegen, The Netherlands, Monograph pp 1–120, 1969.
- Nanda, R (ed) Symposium in Orthodontics, Dental Clinics of North America WB Saunders Co, Philadelphia, PA, 1981. (Translation in Japanese, Spanish, Italian, German and Greek).
- Nanda, R (ed) Management of Complex Orthodontic Problems. Seminars in Orthodontics WB Saunders Co, Philadelphia, PA, 1996.
- Nanda, R (ed) Adult Orthodontics. Dental Clinics of North America, Volume 1. WB Saunders Co, Philadelphia, PA, 40:11, 811-1016, 1996.
- Nanda, R (ed) Adult Orthodontics. Dental Clinics of North America, Volume 11. WB Saunders Co, Philadelphia, PA, 41:1-154, 1997.
- Nanda, R (guest editor) Infromationau aus Orthodontie and Kieferorthopadie 30:30, 1998.
