= Damon system =

System for straightening teeth

The Damon system was created by Dr. Dwight Damon of Damon Orthodontics. It is one of many fixed, passive, self-ligating methods of correcting malocclusions. Passive self-ligating systems use brackets that do not require elastic o-rings to hold the wires in place. By not using the elastic o-rings, it is said that the wires freely slide through the slots without friction. However, this may not be correct as it allows more rotation or tipping of teeth (and therefore some potential loss of precision of movement) before the bracket edges contact the wire, resulting in friction. It is believed that not using o-rings results in better oral hygiene but the research is equivocal, with findings both for and against the theory. To hold the wires in place, the Damon System uses small sliding doors. The addition of 'stops' on the wires helps prevent the wire from becoming displaced from its intended location.

== Procedure ==
In passive self-ligating braces, orthodontic treatment begins with very light wires 0.014 inch in diameter that are made of an alloy of copper, nickel, and titanium (CuNiTi) and have a non-anatomical shape because they are wider than the natural arch. Successively thicker wires are placed as the arches round out and as the teeth level. The next-larger wire is used when it may be passively placed in the brackets. The use of initial light wires and the passive placement of subsequent heavier wires made of stainless steel and/or a TMA alloy may reduce the pressure exerted on the periodontal ligaments. This may compromise the blood flow and trigger a nonphysiologic osteoclastic/osteoblastic activity. However, there is no evidence to support this claim of less force.

Tooth movement has been claimed to occur more rapidly and more comfortably by many doctors using passive self-ligating braces. However numerous randomised clinical trials (RCT's) (e.g.), have been conducted on these brackets and the summary systematic reviews of these have found no difference in the rate of tooth movement or overall treatment time between conventional brackets and Damon brackets.
