= Craven Kurz =

American orthodontist

- Born: Central Butte, Saskatchewan, Canada.
- Education: University of Saskatchewan, McGill University, Columbia University College of Dental Medicine
- Known for: Inventor of lingual braces and founding president of the American Lingual Orthodontic Association
- Medical career
- Profession: Dentist
- Sub-specialties: orthodontics

Craven Kurz was an American orthodontist who is known to be the inventor of the "invisible" or lingual braces in 1975. He was also the founding president of the American Lingual Orthodontic Association.

== Life ==
Kurz was born in Moose Jaw, Saskatchewan, Canada. He attended University of Saskatchewan for college and obtained his dental degree from McGill University in Montreal in 1968. He then attended the orthodontic program at Columbia University College of Dental Medicine in New York. After that, he established his private practice in Westwood, Los Angeles, California, and practiced there for five years while teaching orthodontics at UCLA School of Dentistry. Working with celebrities and TV personalities, Kurz was faced with dilemma of his patients wanting orthodontic care but without showing that they have braces. Therefore, Kurz invented lingual braces for his patients. He also published a textbook called Contemporary Lingual Orthodontics.

Kurz was the founding president of the American Lingual Orthodontic Association.

He died on April 6, 1998, in Marina del Rey.

== Lingual braces ==
First generation of lingual brackets were launched in 1976. These brackets had a larger profile at first. Orthodontic company Ormco manufactured the first Kurz Lingual Appliance. The slot size for the first bracket was 0.018 inches.
