= Orthodontic spacer =

Appliance used in orthodontics

Orthodontic separators (also known as spacers) are rubber bands or metal appliances used in orthodontics. Spacers are placed between the molars at the second orthodontic appointment before molar bands are applied. They are usually added a week before you get your braces, but can sometimes be added after.

Spacers are either circular rubber bands about a centimeter in diameter placed between top and bottom molars; there may be 1-12 spacers applied or small metal spring clips (spring separators) that push the molars apart. The spacers stay between the teeth for one week and move the teeth apart slowly until they are far apart enough so that orthodontists can fit a tooth brace or molar band in between them or fit an expander with rubber rings or other appliances.

== Purpose ==
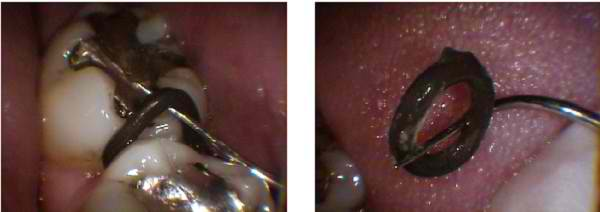
Orthodontic spacer removal.

Spacers are usually used to put spaces in between teeth before braces are established. It can be agitating or painful, but patients are often warned not to pick at them or they will fall out. They are usually rubber, but sometimes they can be metal. They can be used when a patient's teeth are too close together.

Although they are sometimes very painful, they are usually only in place for one to two weeks. Spacers can also cause toothache and gum pain because of the constant pressure against the patient's teeth. The gaps that the spacers create are necessary to apply certain appliances or braces.

There are two common types of expanders used after the spaces have been made. One very primitive, model is a metal bar that has a key used to tighten. Secondly, and more contemporary, there is an expander that is two L-shaped metal rods, attached at the molars. Brackets fit against the edges. It is secured with a spring in the middle that applies pressure.
