= Curve of Wilson =

Arch curvature or posterior occlusal plane

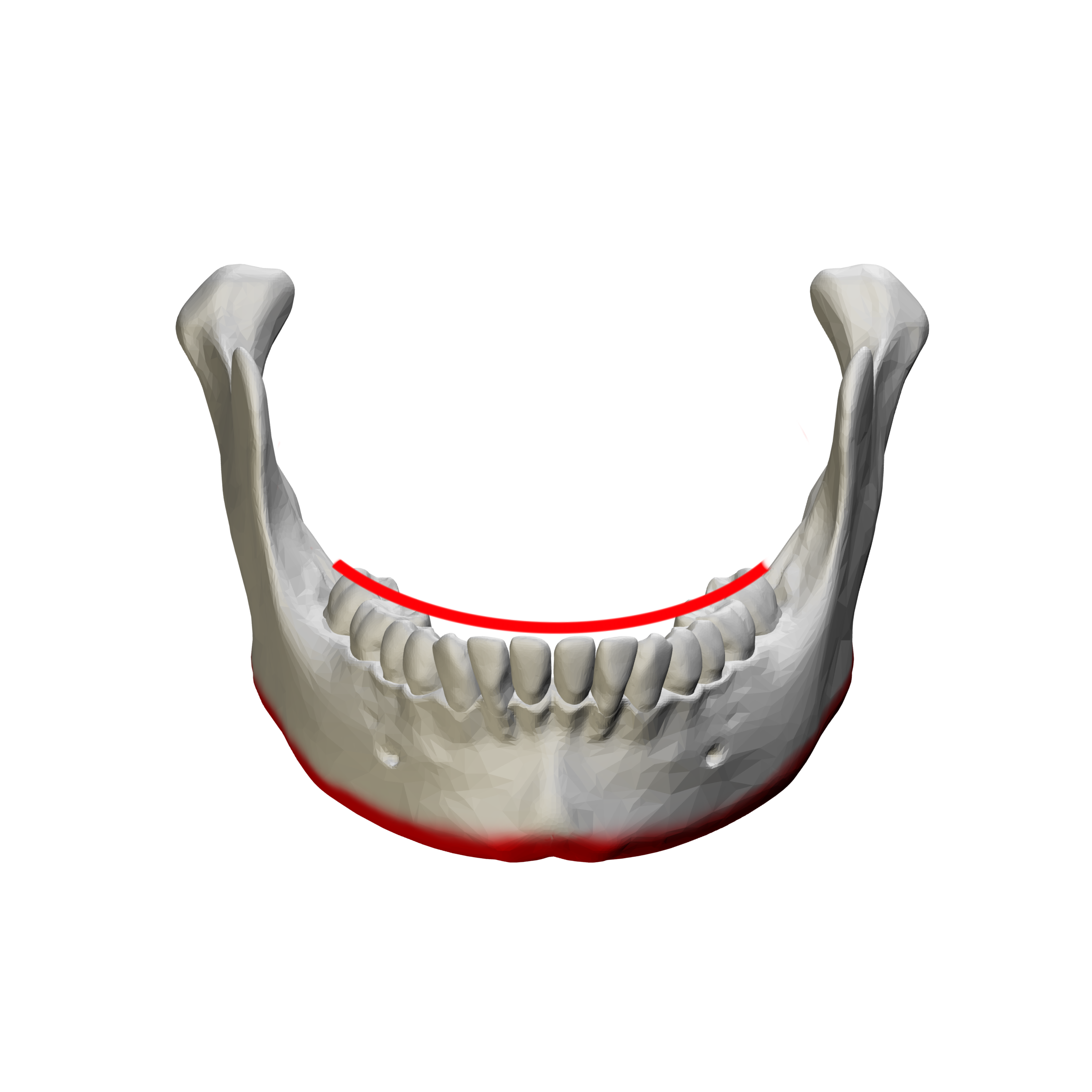
Representation of Wilson curve

The curve of Wilson is the across arch, and across median plane, curvature or posterior occlusal plane. Arc of the curve, which is concave for mandibular teeth and convex for maxillary teeth are defined by a line drawn from left mandibular first molar to right mandibular first molar.

== See also ==
- Curve of Spee
