= Fiberotomy =

A fiberotomy or pericision is an orthodontic surgical procedure designed to sever the gingival fibers around a tooth. It usually reduces the tendency to relapse of tooth rotations corrected by dental braces or other treatments. The most frequently encountered post-orthodontic problem is the retention of re-established tooth position. Relapse (drifting of the tooth back to its position prior to orthodontic correction) may occur anywhere, but it is often associated with teeth that have undergone rotation (twisting) as part of the orthodontic therapy.

A fiberotomy involves the detachment of the fibers that attach the tooth to the bone via the gum. The fibers act much like twisted rubber bands and releasing the tension between the fibers and the tooth reduces the forces that attempt to pull the tooth back to its original position. It is performed near the completion of the orthodontics and is shown to be effective in preventing the relapse of teeth. To perform this procedure, there is the surgical cutting of disrupted transseptal fibres by making a gingival crevicular incision under local anesthetic after orthodontic alignment. This procedure is painless as long as the patient takes an analgesic after the numbing has worn off.
