= Indian Orthodontic Society =

Professional association

- Abbreviation: IOS
- Formation: 1965
- Headquarters: Mumbai, India
- Website: www.iosweb.net

Indian Orthodontic Society is a professional association for orthodontists that was started in 1965 in Mumbai, India.

== History ==
The Indian Orthodontic Society held its first annual conference in 1967 in New Delhi. The Journal of the Indian Orthodontic Society was started by, its first Editor. He was also the founding President of the Society. Naishadh Parikh was the founding Secretary and Treasurer. The other founding members were A.B. Modi, Keki Mistry, Mohandas Bhat, Prem Prakash, and the late H.S. Shaikh.

The Society established the Indian Board of Orthodontics in 1999, the first such board in the field of dentistry in India and the third in the world. The Board was established to examine members with five years of experience after they have completed MDS in clinical excellence in the practice of Orthodontics. The Indian Orthodontic Society also became part of World Federation of Orthodontists at its inception in 1995.

== Objectives ==
1. To popularize and promote the study of Orthodontics
2. To popularize and spread the practice of Orthodontics
3. To educate the public of the importance of Orthodontics

== See also ==
- Indian Dental Association
