= Orthodontic archwire =

Wire used in dental braces

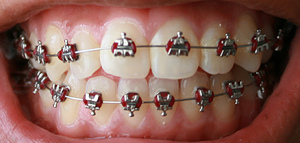
Demonstration of an archwire

An archwire in orthodontics is a wire conforming to the alveolar or dental arch that can be used with dental braces as a source of force in correcting irregularities in the position of the teeth. An archwire can also be used to maintain existing dental positions; in this case it has a retentive purpose.

Orthodontic archwires may be fabricated from several alloys, most commonly stainless steel, nickel-titanium alloy (NiTi), and beta-titanium alloy (composed primarily of titanium and molybdenum).

== Types ==
=== Noble Metal alloy ===
Noble metals such as gold, platinum, iridium, silver and their alloys were used early on in the field of Orthodontics because of their good corrosion resistance. Some of the other qualities that these alloys had were high ductility, variable stiffness (with heat), high resilience and ease of soldering. Disadvantages of these alloys were: Less elasticity, less tensile strength and greater cost. Composition of both platinum and palladium raised the melting point of the alloy and made it corrosion resistant. Copper material, along with the cold-working of the material, gave the strength to the alloy. The alloy composition of the wires made of noble metals would be Gold (55%-65%), Platinum (5-10%), Palladium (5-10%), Copper (11-18%) and Nickel (1-2%). These composition were similar that of Type IV Gold casting alloys. Edward Angle first introduced the German Silver in orthodontics in 1887 when he tried replacing the noble metals in this practice. At that time, John Nutting Farrar condemned Angle for using a material which lead to discoloration in the mouth. He then in 1888, started altering the alloy composition around the German Silver. However, Angle's composition were extremely difficult to reproduce and therefore, the usage of Silver-based alloys did not get popular in orthodontics. Angle was also known to use materials such as rubber, vulcanite, piano wire and silk thread.

=== Stainless steel archwire ===
In 1929, stainless steel was introduced for the use of making appliances. This was the first material that truly replaced the usage of noble alloys in Orthodontics. Steel wire alloys, in comparison to the noble metals, were relatively cheaper. They also had better formability and can be readily used to be soldered and welded for fabrication of complex orthodontic appliances. The stainless steel alloys are of "18-8" austenitic type which contain Chromium (17-25%) and Nickel (8-25%) and Carbon (1-2%). Chromium in this stainless steel alloy forms a thin oxide layer which blocks the diffusion of oxygen into the alloy and allow for the corrosion resistance of this alloy. Angle used stainless steel in his last year practicing orthodontics. He used it as a ligature wire in his patient's mouth. At that time, Emil Herbst was the main opponent of the Stainless steel based alloys. According to him, he preferred using Noble alloys over stainless steel. By 1950, 300 series stainless steel alloy was used by the majority of orthodontists in the United States, as European Orthodontists believed in using functional appliances such as Activator appliance with patient's malocclusions.

Stainless steel archwires have high stiffness, low springiness, corrosion resistant, low range and good formability. These wires are often cheaper than the other archwires and can readily be used as "working" archwires in an orthodontic treatment. Space closure after extractions is often done by placing these archwires in the mouth.

==== Multi-Strand Stainless Steel archwires ====
This type of stainless steel archwire is made up multiple 0.008 in SS wires coiled together. There are 3 types: Coaxial, Braided and or Twisted. The coaxial type of archwire includes 6 strands of 0.008 in strands which are coiled together. The braided archwire includes 8 strands and twisted archwire includes 3. These wires can provide either a round shape or rectangular shaped stainless steel wire. The properties of these wires are drastically different from the traditional stainless steel archwires. They have low stiffness and can be used for initial leveling and aligning stage in orthodontics. However, due to their lower elastic limit they can be readily deformed if acted upon by any other force such as food.

==== Australian archwire ====
Arthur J. Wilcock, along with Raymond Begg, created the "Australian archwire" in the 1940s in Australia. He was a metallurgist from Victoria, Australia. This archwire was prominently used in what is known as Begg Technique. Begg was seeking a stainless steel wire that was light, flexible stayed active for long periods of time in the mouth. The wire had high resiliency and toughness and were heat treated. The initial wire produced had dimension of 0.018in. These wires are often used in the treatment of deep bites because of their increased resistance to permanent deformation. The wire is composed of Iron (64%), Chromium (17%), Nickel (12%) and others.

=== Cobalt-Chromium Archwire ===
In the 1950s, cobalt-chromium alloy started being used in orthodontics. Rocky Mountain Orthodontics first started marketing the cobalt-chromium alloy as Elgiloy in the 1950s. It was the Elgin National Watch Company which introduced this alloy, composed of cobalt (40%), chromium (20%), iron (16%) and nickel (15%). Elgiloy offered increased resilience and strength, however, its stiffness was weak. These types of wires are still sold as alloys known as Remaloy, Forestaloy, Bioloy, Masel and Elgiloy. However, their use have decreased throughout the field of orthodontics due to the fact that no complex bends in wires are needed in today's treatment.

Elgiloy is available in four levels of resilience. Blue Elgiloy (soft), Yellow Elgiloy (ductile), Green Elgiloy (semi-resilient) and Red Elgiloy (resilient).

=== Nickel-titanium (Niti) Archwire ===
NiTi alloy was developed in 1960 by William F. Buehler who worked at the Naval Ordnance Laboratory in Silver Springs, Maryland. The name Nitinol came from Nickel (Ni), Titanium (Ti), Naval Ordinance Laboratory (nol). The first Nickel titanium (NiTi) orthodontic alloy, introduced by Andraeson. This alloy was based on the research done by Buehler. Since their introduction, the wires made out of Niti alloys have become an important part of orthodontic treatment. The composition of the wire has 55% Nickel and 45% Titanium. The first nickel-titanium orthodontic wire alloy was marketed by the Unitek Corporation who are now known as 3M Unitek. These alloys have low stiffness, superelasticity, high springback, large elastic range and were brittle. The initial niti wires did not have shape-memory effect due to the cold-working of the wire. Thus these wires were passive and were considered as a Martensitic-Stabilized alloy.

Pseudoelastic Niti archwires were commercially launched in 1986 and were known as Japanese NiTi and Chinese NiTi. Japanese Niti archwire was first produced by Furukawa Electric Co in 1978. It was first reported for usage of orthodontics by Miura et al. The Japanese alloy was marketed as Sentalloy. Heat-activated NiTi alloys became popular and commercially available in the 1990s. Chinese Niti wires were also developed in 1978 by Dr. Hua Cheng Tien at a research institute in Beijing, China. This wire was first reported in orthodontic literature by Dr. Charles Burstone. These alloys are Austentic-Active alloy and the transition from the Austenitic phase to Martensitic phase happens due to the contact of wire with a force.

==== Copper nickel-titanium alloy ====
In 1994 Ormco Corporation introduced this alloy. This alloy was developed with the help of Rohit Sachdeva and Suchio Miyasaki. Initially, it was available in three temperature transition forms: Superelastic (CuNiTi 27 °C), heat-activated (CuNiTi 35 °C) and (CuNiTi 40 °C). This alloy is composed of nickel, titanium, copper (5%) and chromium (0.2% - 0.5%). Addition of copper leads to better defined transition temperatures in this alloy.

==== Shape memory ====
Niti wires are known to have a unique property of shape memory. Niti wires can exist in two forms known as Austenitic and Martensitic. A temperature phase known as Temperature Transition Range (TTR) serves to define these earlier phase of the Niti wire. Below the TTR temperature, the crystals of Niti wires exist in the Martensitic form and above the TTR, crystals exist as the Austenitic form. The austenitic form happens at high temperatures, low stresses and martensitic phase occurs at low temperatures and high stresses. Austenitic form has body centered cubic (BCC) structure and Martensitic has distorted monoclinic, triclinic or Hexagonal structure. The wire is manufactured and fabricated at temperatures which exist above the TTR. As the wire is warmed above this temperature, it remembers its original shape and conforms to it. Therefore, this property of the wire is known as Shape-memory alloy.

Graded thermodynamic archwires possess different TTR at different segments of the archwires (frontal, premolar and molar), which corresponds respectively to frontal, premolar and molar areas of dental arch. The frontal segments possess the highest transition temperature, followed by the premolar segments. The lowest transition temperatures were reported for the molar segments.

==== Superelasticity ====
Niti wires are known to have another unique property known as Superelasticity. It is the "rubber-like" behavior present in the Niti shape memory alloy. Superelastic Niti wires have excellent springback compared to other niti wires. They can also deliver constant forces over large wire-deflection.

=== Beta-titanium (TMA) archwire ===
Pure titanium can exist in two phases: Alpha and Beta. Alpha phase represents low temperature (below 885 °C) and beta phase represents high temperature (above 885 °C). Charles J. Burstone and Dr. Goldberg developed the β-Titanium when they combined Molybdenum with pure titanium. They devised this alloy to allow these wires to produce lower biomechanical forces compared to the stainless steel and cobalt-chromium-nickel wires. They have better formability and springback than the stainless steel wires. Thus this alloy came to be known as Beta-Titanium alloy. It consists of Titanium (79%), Molybdenum (11%), Zirconium (6%) and Tin (4%). This alloy is known commercially by the name TMA or Titanium-Molybdenum alloy. This alloy does not involve nickel and can be used in patients who have allergy to nickel. TMA wires have rough surfaces and produce most friction out of all the wires used in orthodontics which was found in a study done by Kusy et al. in 1989.

==== Connecticut new archwire (CNA) ====
This type of archwire is a brand of beta titanium.

== Orthodontic Stages ==
=== Leveling and Aligning ===
Wires used in this initial phase in an orthodontic treatment requires them to have low stiffness, high strength and long working range. The ideal wires to use in this phase of treatment is a Nickel-Titanium archwires. Low stiffness will allow small forces to be produced when the wire is engaged in the bracket slots of teeth. High strength would prevent any permanent deformation when the wire is engaged in teeth which are severely crowded.

The evidence in the form of clinical trials testing effectiveness (and other benefits) and potential harms when comparing the use of superelastic NiTi wires, single strand super elastic wires, thermoelastic NiTi wires, and coaxial superelastic NiTi wires is weak and there is no evidence that a certain wire or size of wire is better than the others. The choice of different wires depends on an orthodontists clinical judgement. There is weak evidence to suggest that superelastic NiTi wires may be associated with slightly more pain after the first day when compared with thermoelastic NiTi wires. In addition, when comparing multielastic superelastic NiTi and single strand superelastic NiTi wires to coaxial superelastic NiTi wires, the alignment rate may be lower for the superelastic NiTi wires.

== Terms used in defining wires ==
- Stress - Internal distribution of load
- Strain - Internal distortion produced by the load
- Proportional limit - A point at which first permanent deformation is observed
- Yield strength - At this point, an orthodontic wire will not return to its original shape
- Ultimate tensile strength - The maximum load a wire can sustain
- Failure point - A point at which a wire breaks
- Modulus of elasticity - It is the ratio between stress and strain. It is measured by the slope of the elastic region. It describes the stiffness or rigidity of the material
- Load-Deflection Rate - It is defined as for a given load/force, the amount of deflection observed is known as the load deflection rate
- Stiffness - The slope of a stress/strain graph of an orthodontic wires is proportional to the stiffness of a wire. The higher the slope, the higher the stiffness. It is same as modulus of elasticity. Stiffness of the wire is proportional to a diameter of the wire but inversely proportional to the length or span of a wire. Stainless steel wire has higher stiffness than Beta-Titanium alloy which has higher stiffness than Nickel-Titanium alloy.
- Range - It is a range of an orthodontic wire that will bend until permanent deformation occurs.
- Springback - It is the ability of a wire to go through large deflections without being permanently deformed.
- Resilience (materials science) - It represents the energy of a wire.
- Formability - It is the amount of permanent bending a wire will go through before it breaks.
- Ductility - It is an ability of the wire to sustain a large amount of permanent deformation without being ruptured.
- Biocompatibility - A biocompatible wire would be resistance to corrosion and would be tolerant to the tissues of oral mucosa
- Shape-memory alloy - It is an ability of the wire to remember its original shape after being plastically deformed
- Twinning - It is a property of a metal that refers to a movement that divides lattice into two symmetric parts. Deformation in certain structures occurs by twinning. The niti alloys are characterized by multiple, rather than single, twinning through metal.
- Hysteresis - Hysteris in orthodontics is associated with the Nickel-Titanium wires. It is the difference between temperature of the starting phase of a Niti wire and a finishing phase of a Niti wire. It can also be known as difference in temperature when a Niti wire goes from its Austenitic (high temperature) state to a Martensitic (low temperature) state.
- Quenching - Rapid cooling of a material after it is annealed. It leads to material losing its strength but gaining its ductility
- Annealing (metallurgy) - Process of heating a material which leads to material gaining strength and losing its ductility
