= Lingual arch =

Orthodontic device

Lower removable lingual arch.

A lingual arch is an orthodontic device which connects two molars in the upper or lower dental arch. The lower lingual arch (LLA) has an archwire adapted to the lingual side of the lower teeth. In the upper arch the archwire is usually connecting the two molars passing through the palatal vault, and is commonly referred as "Transpalatal Arch" (TPA). The TPA was originally described by Robert Goshgarian in 1972. TPAs could possibly be used for maintaining transverse arch widths, anchorage in extraction case, prevent buccal tipping of molars during Burstonian segmented arch mechanics, transverse anchorage and space maintenance.

LLA and TPA are fabricated by placing bands on the molars. These are connected to the archwire. The wire can be soldered to the bands or inserted into lingual sheaths welded to the molar band (removable LLA and TPA).

== Passive use ==
LLA is frequently used as a space maintainer for the lower teeth. In such a case a LLA maintains the molar position. LLA and TPA can also be used to stabilize molar position in the attempt to avoid side effects that can take place during orthodontic therapy. As a space maintainer LLA is frequently used in cases where an early loss of the second deciduous molar takes place. In such a case LLA prevents the permanent molars from migrating mesially (forward) thus blocking off the eruption space for the premolar teeth. LLA is also used in order to maintain the so-called "Leeway space", which is the extra space available in the arch when the deciduous molars are exfoliated and replaced by smaller permanent premolars.

== Transpalatal arch ==
Transpalatal arch or TPA may also be used as an adjunct in keeping anchorage in an extraction treatment in Orthodontics. A paper by Zablocki et al. showed negligible statistically significant difference between patients who received TPA vs patients who don't receive TPA. However, many other studies have shown that TPA cannot provide absolute anchorage to prevent mesial movement of the posterior molars. Baccetti et al. (2011) showed that the TPA could be used in the absence of Rapid Maxillary Expander. In these cases, the patients have palatally displaced canine teeth which do not require expansion. The TPA maintains the width of the arch as the palatally displaced canines are brought into occlusion. According to Fiorelli and Melsen, the role of passive TPA for anchorage has been frequently misunderstood. A passive TPA solidarizes the two molars or the two posterior segments, thus preventing any individual independent movement, as for example molar rotation or tipping due to alignment wires, loops or cantilevers, and this is a kind of anchorage source, however, cannot prevent the movement of the 2 molars as a group, as in the case of premolar space closure.

TPA is also used to prevent buccal tipping of the molars when a Burstone-type Segmental Arch mechanics are being used. In a case of open bite, TPA can be used to maintain the molar position when TADs are being used to intrude the upper molars to close the open bite.

== Active use ==
LLA and TPA, if removable, can also be activated in order to obtain molar movements in all planes of space. LLA and TPA are more frequently activated to expand or reduce the intermolar distance and to rotate the molars. In this way it is possible to reshape the whole dental arch if molars are connected to the other teeth by means of a buccal archwire.

Upper Arch expanded by a TPA activation.

LLA and TPA archwires are usually made out of stainless steel with a 0.032" cross section for a passive use. A beta-titanium wire is more effective if LLA or TPA must be activated to displace molars (Active Use).
