= Charles J. Burstone =

American orthodontist

- Born: April 4, 1928; Kansas City, United States.
- Died: February 11, 2015 (aged 86)
- Education: Washington University in St. Louis
- Known for: Being the 'father of' Biomechanics in orthodontics.
- Medical career
- Profession: Dentist
- Institutions: University of Indiana Orthodontics; UConn Health Center
- Sub-specialties: Orthodontics

Charles J. Burstone (April 4, 1928 – February 11, 2015) was an American orthodontist who was notable for his contributions to biomechanics and force-systems in the field of orthodontics. He was well known for co-development of new orthodontic material such as beta titanium, nickel titanium, and long fiber-reinforced composite. He wrote more than 200 articles in scientific fields.

== Career ==
Burstone was chairman of Indiana School of Orthodontics in 1961. In 1970, he created Orthodontic Department at University of Connecticut. He was the head of the department from 1970 to 1992. In 1994, he was appointed Professor Emeritus in the Orthodontic Department. He later retired and spent his time at Uconn Health Center.

Burstone published his first paper in 1959 in Journal of Dental Research. In 1961, Burstone was the first to introduce the photographic occlusogram. He is also known to have developed the segmental Intrusion (orthodontics) arch technique in 1950s.

Burstone and Legan in their 1980 paper proposed a constructed horizontal line. This line is drawn through nasion at an angle of 7 degrees to the SN line. They developed this line because of reliability issues with the SN line when one can easily place the sella point up/down which can change the cephalometric measurements. This line tends to be parallel to the true horizontal line. Burstone also formulated B line which is a line constructed from soft tissue subnasale to soft tissue pogonion. He also developed COGS (Cephalometrics for Orthognathic Surgery) analysis for patients requiring orthognathic surgery.

Burstone created the Beta-Titanium orthodontic wire in 1980 and Chinese Niti wire in 1985. He also popularized the segmental-arch mechanics in 1962. He developed a T-Loop design for the purpose of space closure in orthodontics. He also wrote many papers related to the topic of center of resistance of anterior teeth during various orthodontic tooth movements.

Burstone worked with Ravindra Nanda at University of Connecticut Health Center. Flavio Uribe, current Program Director of the Uconn Orthodontic Department, received the Charles J. Burstone Endowed Professorship in Orthodontics in 2012. He died at the age of 86 in Seoul, South Korea.

== Textbooks ==
- The Biomechanical Foundation of Clinical Orthodontics published in 2015
- Problem Solving in Orthodontics: Goal-Oriented Treatment Strategies published in 2000
- Retention and Stability in Orthodontics published in 1993
- The Biology of Tooth Movement published in 1988

== Awards and positions ==
- 1956 - AAO Research Essay Award
- 1965 - Appointed to dental study section of US Public Health Service
- 1969 - President of Great Lake Society of Orthodontists
- 1979 - Director of American Board of Orthodontists
- 1983 - Strang Award by Connecticut Society of Orthodontists
- 1983 - Tokyo Medical-Dental Research Award
- 1986 - President of American Board of Orthodontists
- 1987 - Sociade De Ortodoncia De Chile Award
- 1990 - Robert Strang Memorial Lecture Award
- 1991 - Jarabak Lecture Award, University of Michigan
- 1994 - Inducted into Royal College of Surgeons in Edinburgh, Scotland
- 1999 - Ketcham Award by American Society of Orthodontists

== See also ==
- Intrusion (orthodontics)
