= Henry Albert Baker =

American orthodondist

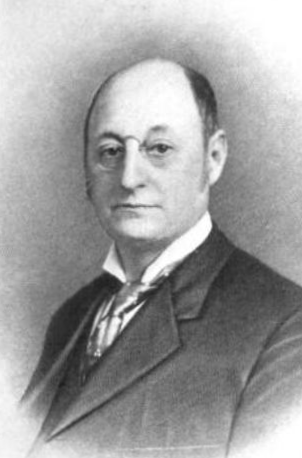
- Born: November 27, 1848; Newport, New Hampshire
- Died: April 24, 1934 (aged 85); Hillsborough, New Hampshire
- Education: Boston College of Dentistry
- Known for: Developed Baker Anchorage and discovered the intermaxillary elastics for the field of Orthodontics
- Medical career
- Profession: Dentist
- Sub-specialties: Orthodontics

Henry Albert Baker (November 27, 1848 – April 24, 1934) was an American orthodontist who was known to introduce orthodontics to the use of intermaxilary elastics. He is also known for the Baker anchorage.

== Life ==
Henry Albert Baker was born in Newport, New Hampshire in 1848. His ancestors were Captain John Lowell, an Indian Fighter and Hannah Dustin. He grew up at his family farm in his early years. He eventually attended Geisel School of Medicine . In 1873, he started practicing dentistry in Woodstock, Vermont. He formed the Vermont State Dental Society in 1876 and served its vice-president. He then went to Boston Dental College and graduated from there in 1879. Baker was known for his work with the patients with Cleft Lip and Palate deformities.

In 1874 he married Julia Willis and had two sons: Lawrence Willis Baker and Warren Stearns Baker. Lawrence followed his father's footsteps where he became an Orthodontic Professor at Harvard Dental School and Warren died in his early manhood years.

After her death in 1918, Baker retired to Hillsborough, New Hampshire. He died there in 1934.

== Orthodontics ==
The elastics introduced by Baker were used to apply force in Orthodontics. Baker Anchorage combined the rubber tubing with a wire crib. EJ Tucker initially described the usage of elastics in the field of Dentistry. However, not much importance was given until Baker and Dr. Case introduced the usage of elastics for intermaxillary traction. Baker's discovery of the intermaxillary elastics was itself a source of contention between Edward Angle and Calvin Case. Angle supported claim by Baker about the discovery of the intermaxillary elastics contrary to Case's claim that he discovered the intermaxillary elastics.

His discovery was significant in the field of orthodontics because it eliminated the need for extracting some teeth in certain cases. This was recognized by Angle in a letter that he had written to Baker. Baker was recognized by American Society of Orthodontists in 1923 where he was awarded a bronze bas relief of himself.

== Awards and positions ==
- American Association of Orthodontists - Honorary Member
- Vermont State Dental Society - Honorary Member
- New Hampshire State Dental Society - Honorary Member
