= Calvin Case =

American orthodontist (1847–1923)

Calvin Suveril Case (April 24, 1847 – April 16, 1923) was an American orthodontist who is one of the earliest figures in orthodontics. Case did extensive work with cleft lip and palate and is known for developing the Velum Obturator. Case is also known for his part in the Extraction Debate of 1911 that happened between Edward Angle and Case.

== Life ==
He was born in Jackson, Michigan, in 1847. He graduated from Fayette High School in Fayette, Ohio, in 1864. He then served in United States military during the American Civil War in 1864. After the war ended in 1865, he started studying dentistry at one of the local dentists in Jonesville, Michigan. In 1867, he became partners with J. A. Robinson in Jackson, Michigan, at his dental office. He eventually attended Ohio College of Dental Surgery and graduated from there in 1871, becoming one of the first men to graduate in Michigan state in dentistry. In 1881, he accepted a position as a Professor of Prosthetic Dentistry at University of Michigan. He also studied at Medical School at University of Michigan during the same time and graduated from there in 1884. Case was married to Miss Florence Baxter in 1868.

Case participated in National Archery Tournament in Chicago in 1909 and placed 2nd in the Men's Handicap Section. He was a skilled archer, as he practiced on a court at his home in Kentworth, Illinois. Case served as President of Michigan State Dental Association from 1889 to 1890. He then accepted a position of Professor of Prosthetic Dentistry and Orthodontics at Chicago Dental Infirmary. In 1895, he was the President of Chicago Odontological Society. He continued teaching orthodontics at Chicago College of Dental Surgery for rest of his life.

== Career ==
During his life, Case published 123 articles from 1881 to 1923. His first paper was entitled Dental Education and Mechanics which was published in Ohio State Journal of Dental Science in 1881. He was author of one of the chapters in the textbook called American Textbook of Operative Dentistry in 1897. In addition he wrote several other textbooks.

Case was also known to be a pioneer dentist in relation to prosthetic correction of cleft palate. In one of the papers he published in 1885 called A Method For Producing the Kingsley Cleft Palate Velum, he described a Velum Obturator that could be used in children who have cleft lip and palate. This obturator was self-sustaining and it restored the function of the soft palate and allowed the wearer to speak correctly.

== Controversy with Edward Angle ==
Throughout his career, Case was known to have ideas that were opposite to Edward Angle. Primarily, both these figures were divisive due to their views on extraction of teeth vs non-extraction of teeth when treating malocclusions in the speciality of orthodontics. The entire controversy between Angle and Case started when Angle claimed that the use of Intermaxillary elastics were first used by Henry Albert Baker, as opposed to first used by Case. Case claimed that in 1890 he started using the elastics first when he reported this use to Chicago Dental Society and Columbian Dental Congress in 1893.

Martin Dewey was known to practice orthodontics without doing any extractions. At the annual meeting of National Dental Association in 1911, later known as American Dental Association, Case and Mathew Cryer had a debate against Angle, Martin Dewey, Albert H. Ketcham who represented the "New School" at the Extraction Debate of 1911. During this debate. Case presented an article called The question of Extraction in Orthodontia which was followed by discussions by different orthodontists. Case's premise later inspired Charles Tweed in the 1940s to promote premolar extraction and extraction as the ideal way to prepare a patient for orthodontic treatment: 4 healthy adult premolars are extracted and the rest of the teeth are pulled back with rubber bands. Premolar extraction rose to popularity in the 1970s, when up to 60% percent of all patients were routinely treated with the Tweed technique. At the same time, it was observed in research published in the AJO-DO that this technique led to the retrusion of the jaws, "flattened" profile, and reduced vertical dimension.

The controversy about extraction reached its peak in 1986 when a young woman sued her orthodontist for the "mutilation" of her face due to the extraction treatment, and the severe jaw pained it caused (cf Susan Brimm case). Plaintiff Susan Brimm was awarded 1.3 million dollars for the damage caused by this by then standard orthodontic procedure. In panic about what this jury conclusion would mean for the rising orthodontic specialty's reputation, and to ward off copy-cat lawsuits, the American Association of Orthodontists (AAO) commissioned and paid for research articles that established that the "jaw joint has nothing to do with the teeth." These research articles are required reading in US orthodontic schools as of 2023, and orthodontists today tend to believe that this commissioned "high quality evidence" disproves that extraction/retraction can cause temporomandibular disorder.

Despite the AAO's persistent claims that extraction/retraction cannot cause jaw joint problems, the AAO encouraged the lowering of the extraction rate. From 70% of all cases in the US, extraction use dropped to 25% of all cases immediately after the Brimm verdict.

In other parts of the world, the Calvin-Tweed extraction method is still used in up to 80% of orthodontic cases, and Tweed and Case are celebrated as pioneers in the field. This despite the fact that a 2022 peer-reviewed study on the topic has confirmed that extraction orthodontic treatment changes mandibular kinematics (movement and position) and may be a risk for temporomandibular disorder.
