= Palatal expansion =

Orthodontics device to widen the upper jaw

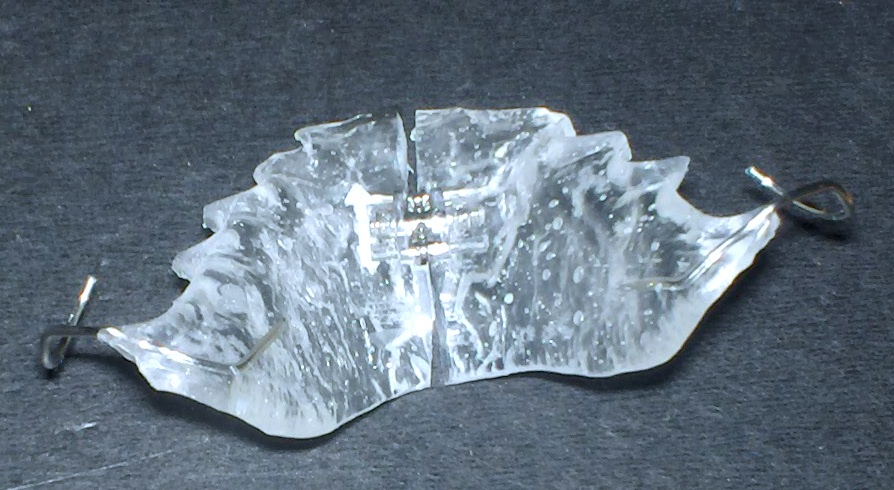
A palatal expander

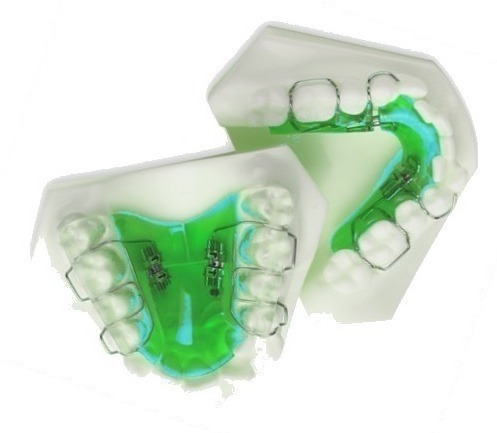
Upper and lower jaw functional expanders

A palatal expander is a device in the field of orthodontics which is used to widen the upper jaw (maxilla) so that the bottom and upper teeth will fit together better. This is a common orthodontic procedure. The use of an expander is most common in children and adolescents 8–18 years of age. It can also be used in adults, although expansion is more uncomfortable and takes longer in adults. A patient who would rather not wait several months for the end result achieved by a palatal expander may be able to opt for a surgical separation of the maxilla. Use of a palatal expander is most often followed by braces to then straighten the teeth. Palate expanders are a useful tool in expanding the airway due to previous dental extractions.

It is believed that expansion therapy should be started in patients either before or during their peak growth spurt. To obtain maximal skeletal changes, the therapy is typically initiated at a very early age. Expansion therapy performed after the peak growth spurt will lead to more dental changes than skeletal ones, leading to tipping of buccal teeth.

== Indications for a palatal expander ==
Maxillary expansion is indicated in cases with a difference in the width of the upper jaw to the lower jaw equal to or greater than 4 mm. Typically this is measured from the width of the outside of the first molars in the upper jaw compared to the lower jaw taking into account that the molars will often tip outward to compensate for the difference. Rapid palatal expansion is also used in cleft palate repair, and to gain room for teeth in patients with moderate crowding of the teeth in the upper jaw.

== Types of expansion ==
=== Rapid palatal expansion ===
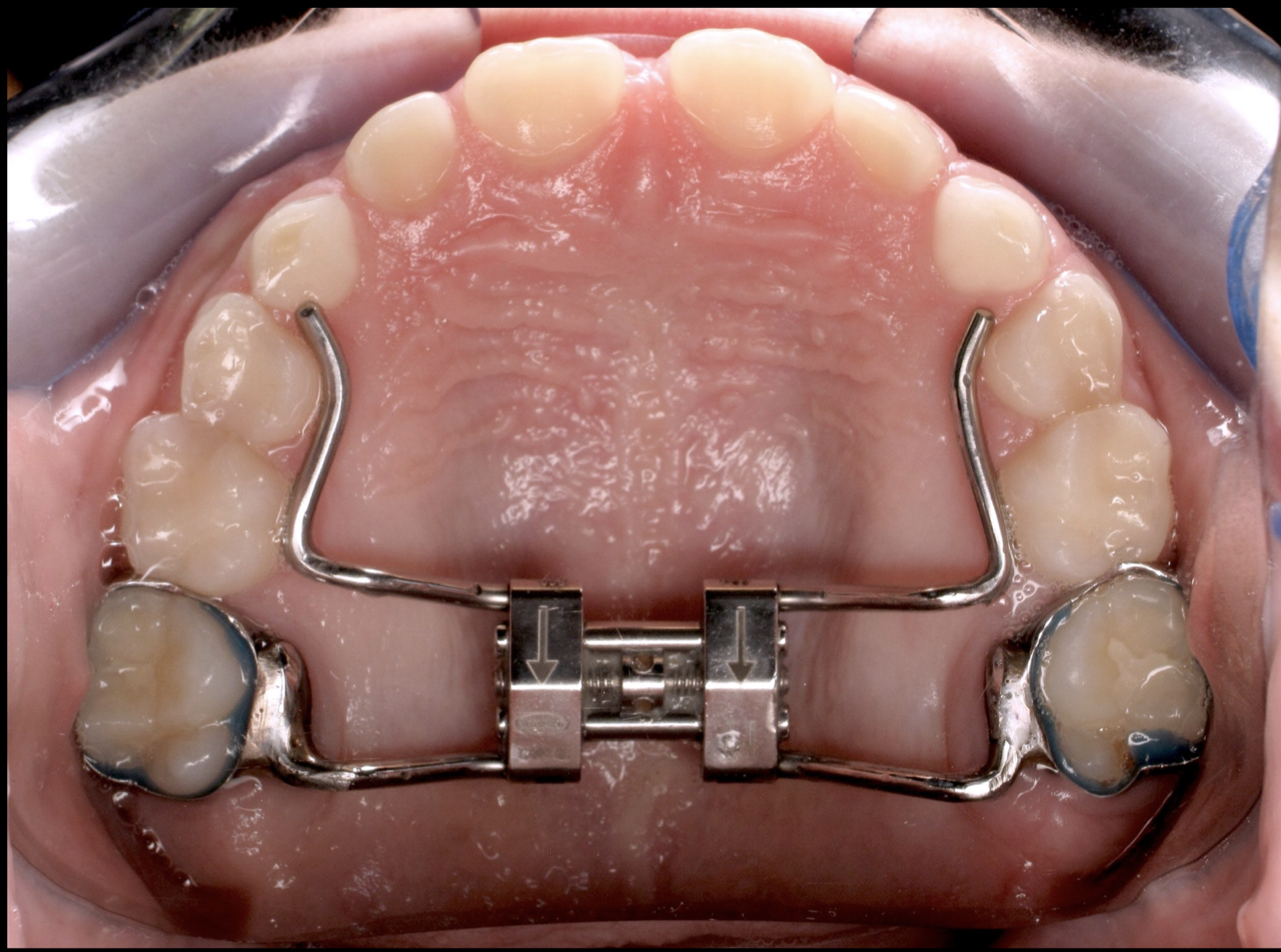
Palatal expander in mixed dentition.

Rapid palatal expansion (RPE) or Rapid Maxillary Expansion (RME) is an expansion technique where expansion of 0.5 mm to 1 mm is achieved each day until the posterior crossbite is relieved. The expander works by turning a key inside the center of the expander. The turn of this key will push the arms of the expander.

For stability purposes, the RPE usually remain in the patient's mouth anywhere between 3–6 months, but this time may vary between patients. This is often known as "six month retention period" during which the bone fills the gap in the maxilla that was created by the expansion process. To prevent any type of relapse, a retainer is given to the patient to keep the teeth in proper alignment. RPE can be tooth supported, bone supported or both.

==== Effects ====
The expansion process usually results in a large gap between the patient's two top front teeth, often known as diastema. This gap is closed naturally and the teeth may overlap which leads to braces being needed. Some may develop a large space while others do not develop a space at all. It usually takes a week or two for one to adjust to eating and speaking after first receiving the rapid palatal expander. This process requires patients to turn the expansion screw themselves to widen the expander. For expansion that is not managed by the patient and on the lower jaw, a bionator appliance may be a more suitable alternative.

=== Slow expansion ===
Slow expansion techniques expands maxilla at a much slower rate compared to the rapid maxillary expansion technique. In slow expansion technique, a patient is ordered to turn the screw 4 times which amounts of 1mm per week. Patient is instructed to turn the jackscrew at the same rate for next 8–10 weeks to achieve the desired expansion. This slow rate of expansion allows skeletal and dental changes to happen in a 1:1 ratio. This means that equal amount of dental and skeletal expansion is achieved, compared to RME technique where mostly skeletal expansion is achieved initially.

Slow expansion has also been advocated to be more physiologic to the tissues of the maxilla and it causes less pain. Some studies have reported that diastema in slow type of expansion also happens less due to the interdental fibers having chance to close the space as the maxilla is being expanded.

=== Implant-assisted expansion ===
Mini-implant Assisted Rapid Palatal Expansion (MARPE) involves the forces being applied directly to the maxillary bone instead of the teeth. This technique involves placing anywhere from 2–4 mini-implants in the palatal vault area of maxilla to anchor the RME appliance to the screws. The patient is then asked to turn the jackscrew with the rapid approach over next two weeks.

This technique allows palatal expansion to be performed in young adults, in which the palatal suture is already fused, a result which was previously only achieved surgically. It has the advantage of being minimally invasive compared to SARPE and of achieving a greater degree of skeletal expansion compared to dentoalveolar expansion. In most adults, especially males a surgical assist may be recommended to achieve consistent outcomes, such as a typical SARPE procedure (now SAMARPE) or less invasive techniques. It has been demonstrated that both posterior expansion at the PNS, as well as expansion of the nasal aperture are critical in treating Obstructive sleep apnea.

=== Surgically Assisted Rapid Palatal Expansion (SARPE) ===
Once a patient reaches maturity (puberty) the palate halves or the Intermaxillary suture fuses together into a single palate tissue. If the patient suffers with a constricted maxillary arch, a palatal expander would need to be used. However, with the matured palate, the palatal expander would need to be surgically inserted onto the mid-palatal suture. Typically, the patient would be under the care of an oral-maxillofacial surgeon and the surgical procedure would commence.

The mid-palatal suture is first cut open into two parts. The center of the midpalatal suture is then inserted into the open slit. Once fully inserted, the mid-palatal suture of the patient is then closed by the surgeon. The orthodontist will then finish the procedure by connecting the palatal expanders band rings to the patients maxillary molars.

== Side-effects of a palatal expansion ==
- Trouble with speech – Patients who have expanders may experience extra saliva and lisps (pronouncing the letter s, t, and r blends become very difficult).
- Pain – Patients may experience pain and headaches while wearing palatal expanders and when the screw is turned.
- Sores on tongue – This can happen due to contact with the expander's metal bars.
- Diastema – Space between upper front two teeth
- Fenestration of buccal bone
- Compression of periodontal ligament near posterior teeth
- Extrusion of posterior teeth
- Increased lingual bone thickness, decreased buccal bone thickness

One of the limits of expansion is the zygomatic buttress. It is known that this anatomical bony complex limits the maxillary expansion posteriorly. Maxillary expansion does tend to open up circumaxillary sutures, circumzygomatic sutures, intermaxillary sutures and midpalatal sutures. Expansion also tends to happen more anteriorly than posteriorly.

== Amount of expansion ==
Each patient presents with different malocclusion and will need different amount of expansion. It is a general rule to expand the maxilla to a point where the lingual cusp of maxillary molar teeth touch the buccal cusp of mandibular molar teeth. Studies done decades ago by Krebs (1964), Stockfisch (1969) and Linder Aronson (1979) showed that about one-third to one-half of the expansion was lost before the expansion was eventually stabilized.

== History ==
Westcott first reported placing mechanical forces on maxilla in 1859. Emerson C. Angell was the first person to publish a paper about palatal expansion in 1860 in Dental Cosmos. He placed a screw between the maxillary premolars of a 14-year-old girl for two weeks. When she returned, he observed expansion in her upper arch. In 1877, Walter Coffin developed the Coffin Spring for the purpose of arch expansion. In 1889, J. H. McQyillen who was the president of the American Dental Association at that time, opposed Angell's idea regarding arch expansion. Goddard, in 1890, and Landsberger, in 1910, revisited the idea of arch expansion. Goddard standardized the expansion protocol in adjusting the expander twice a day for three weeks.

Dr. Andrew J Haas reintroduced his expansion device to United States called Haas Expander in 1956. He was also one of the first people to report lowering of mandible with bite opening and increase in nasal width and gain in arch perimeter. Robert M. Ricketts introduced the Quad Helix in 1975 which was a modification of the W Spring. Biederman introduced the tooth-borne Hyrax Expander in 1968. Cohen and Silverman were first ones to introduce the Bonded type of expander in 1973.

== See also ==
- List of orthodontic functional appliances
- List of palatal expanders
- SARPE
