= Orthotist =

Healthcare specialist who creates braces

- System: Musculoskeletal disorders
- Focus: Braces and orthotic devices

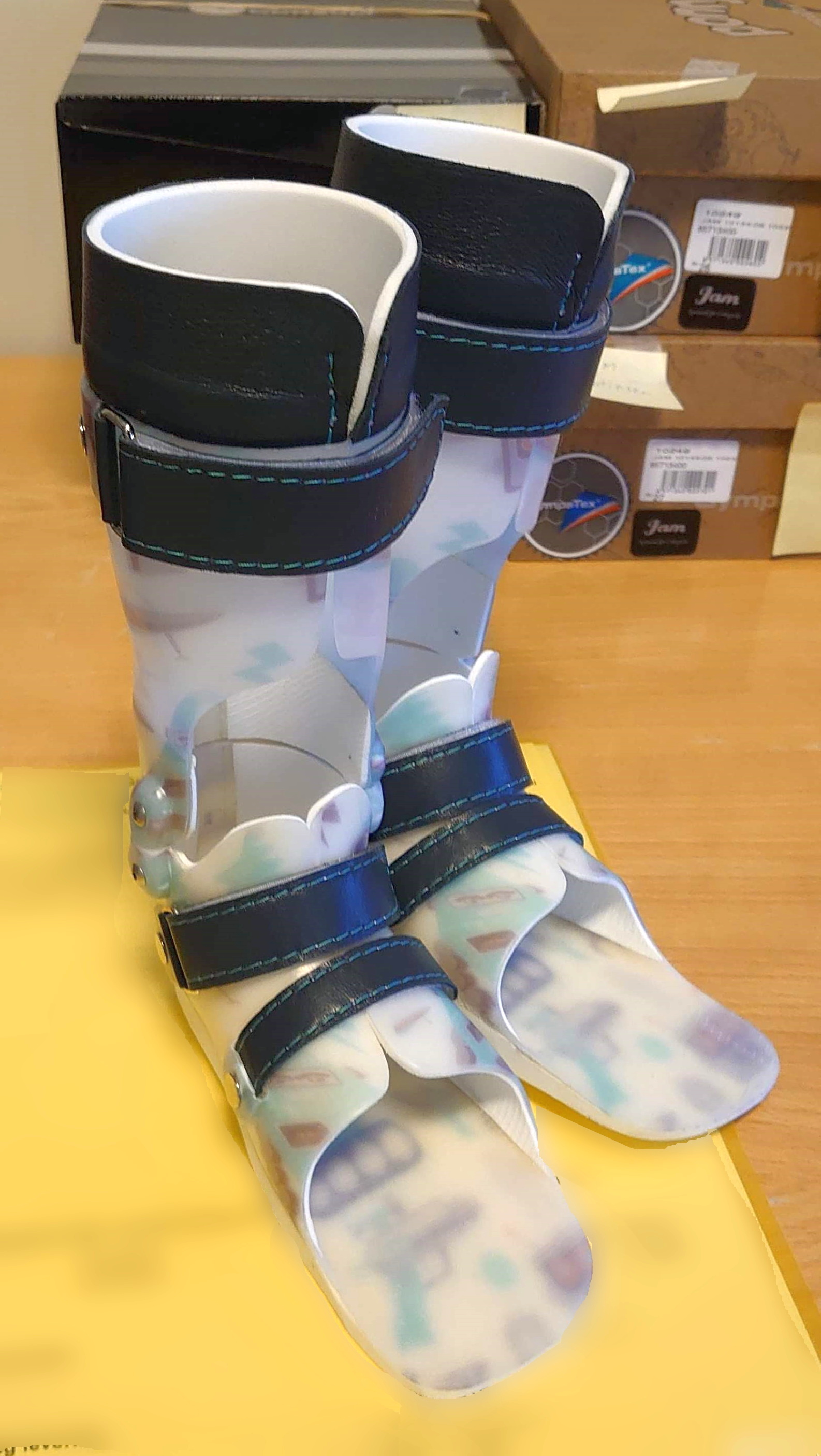
Ankle-foot orthotics (AFO) for a child. It can be used to support an isolated foot drop by blocking plantar flexion.

An orthotist is a healthcare professional who specializes in the provision of orthoses including braces and other orthotic devices. An orthotist has overall responsibly of orthotics treatment, and can supervise and mentor the practice of other personnel. They are clinicians trained to assess the needs of the user, prescribe treatment, determine the precise technical specifications of orthotic devices, take measurements and images of body segments, prepare models of the limb, fit devices, and evaluate treatment outcome. In the United States, orthotists work by prescription from a licensed healthcare provider. Physical therapists are not legally authorized to prescribe orthoses in the U.S. In the U.K., orthotists are autonomous clinicians accepting direct referrals for orthotic assessment from doctors or other healthcare professionals.

== Scope ==
The scope of an orthotist includes the design and application of orthoses (braces or orthotic devices). The definition of an orthosis is an “externally applied device used to modify the structural and functional characteristics of the neuromuscular and skeletal system”.

== Training ==
=== Canada ===
In Canada, a Certified Orthotist CO(c) provides clinical assessment, treatment plan development, patient management, technical design, and fabrication of custom orthoses to maximize patient outcomes. To become CBCPO certified through Orthotics Prosthetics Canada (OPC) an applicant must successfully meet the following requirements:

- be fluent in French or English;
- be a Canadian citizen or legal landed immigrant;
- graduate from an OPC approved post-secondary clinical Prosthetic and Orthotic program;
- complete a minimum 3450 hours of Residency in Orthotics under the direct supervision of a Canadian certified orthotist;
- successfully challenge the written and practical national certification exams.

Upon successful completion of the national certification exams, candidates are conferred the designation of Canadian Certified Orthotist CO(c).

=== United Kingdom ===
In the UK orthotists assess patients, and where appropriate design and fit orthoses for any part of the body. Registration is with the Health and Care Professions Council and BAPO - the British Association of Prosthetics and Orthotics. The training is a B.Sc.(Hons) in Prosthetics and Orthotics at either the University of Salford or University of Strathclyde. New graduates are therefore eligible to work as an orthotist and/or prosthetist.

Podiatrists are the other profession involved with foot orthotic provision. They are also registered with the Health and Care Professions Council . Podiatrists assess gait to provide orthotics to improve foot function and alignment or may use orthoses to redistribute stress on pressure areas for those with diabetes or rheumatoid arthritis.

=== United States ===
A licensed orthotist is an orthotist who is recognized by the particular state in which they are licensed to have met basic standards of proficiency, as determined by examination and experience to adequately and safely contribute to the health of the residents of that state. An American Board of Certification certified orthotist has met certain standards; these include a degree in orthotics, completion of a one-year residency at an approved clinical site, and passing a rigorous three-part exam. A certified orthotist (CO) is an orthotist who has passed the certification standards of the American Board of Certification in Orthotics, Prosthetics and Pedorthics. Other credentialing bodies who are involved in orthotics include the Board for Orthotic Certification, the pharmaceutical industry, the Pedorthic Footcare Association, and various of the professional associations who work with athletic trainers, physical and occupational therapists, and orthopedic technologists/cast technicians.

=== Iran ===
Four universities including the Iran University of Medical Science, Isfahan University of Medical Science, University of Social Welfare and Rehabilitation Sciences and Iran Red Crescent University confer bachelor of science in the Prosthetics and Orthotics. Three universities including Isfahan University of Medical Science, the Iran University of Medical Science and University of Social Welfare and Rehabilitation Science also confer M.Sc. and Ph.D. New bachelor graduates are eligible to work as an orthotist and prosthetist after registration in the Medical Council of Iran.

== See also ==
- Orthotics
- Prosthetist
