= CMD =

CMD may refer to:

== Entities ==
- Cable Mágico Deportes, a Peruvian TV network
- Center for Media and Democracy, advocacy organization in the US
- Center for Molecular Design, Janssen Pharmaceutica
- Coleg Meirion-Dwyfor, a college in Gwynedd, Wales
- Creative Micro Designs, a defunct American computer peripheral company
- CMD Technology, a defunct American computer storage controller company
- Lakas–CMD, Lakas–Christian Muslim Democrats, a political party in the Philippines

== Medical ==
- Congenital muscular dystrophy
- Craniomandibular dysfunction
- Custom-made device, a medical device designed and manufactured for the specific use of a particular patient.

== Technology ==
- Command Prompt (Windows), command prompt on the OS/2 and Windows NT families of operating systems, shortened to cmd.exe
- CMD file (CP/M), the filename extension used by executable programs
- Command key, usually abbreviated "cmd"
- Concerted metalation deprotonation, a kind of chemical reaction

== Travel ==
- Camden Road railway station, London, England, National Rail code
- Cootamundra Airport, IATA airport code "CMD"

== Other ==
- Chromo-modal dispersion
- C.M.D. or Cmd, a Command paper, published by the UK government
- Color-magnitude diagram, a plot of brightness against colour for a group of stars
- Catastrophe à moyens dépassé, "disaster without sufficient rescue means" in French

== See also ==
- CMDS (disambiguation)
- command (disambiguation)
