= Mohamadreza Baghaban Eslaminejad =

Mohammadreza Baghban Eslaminejad
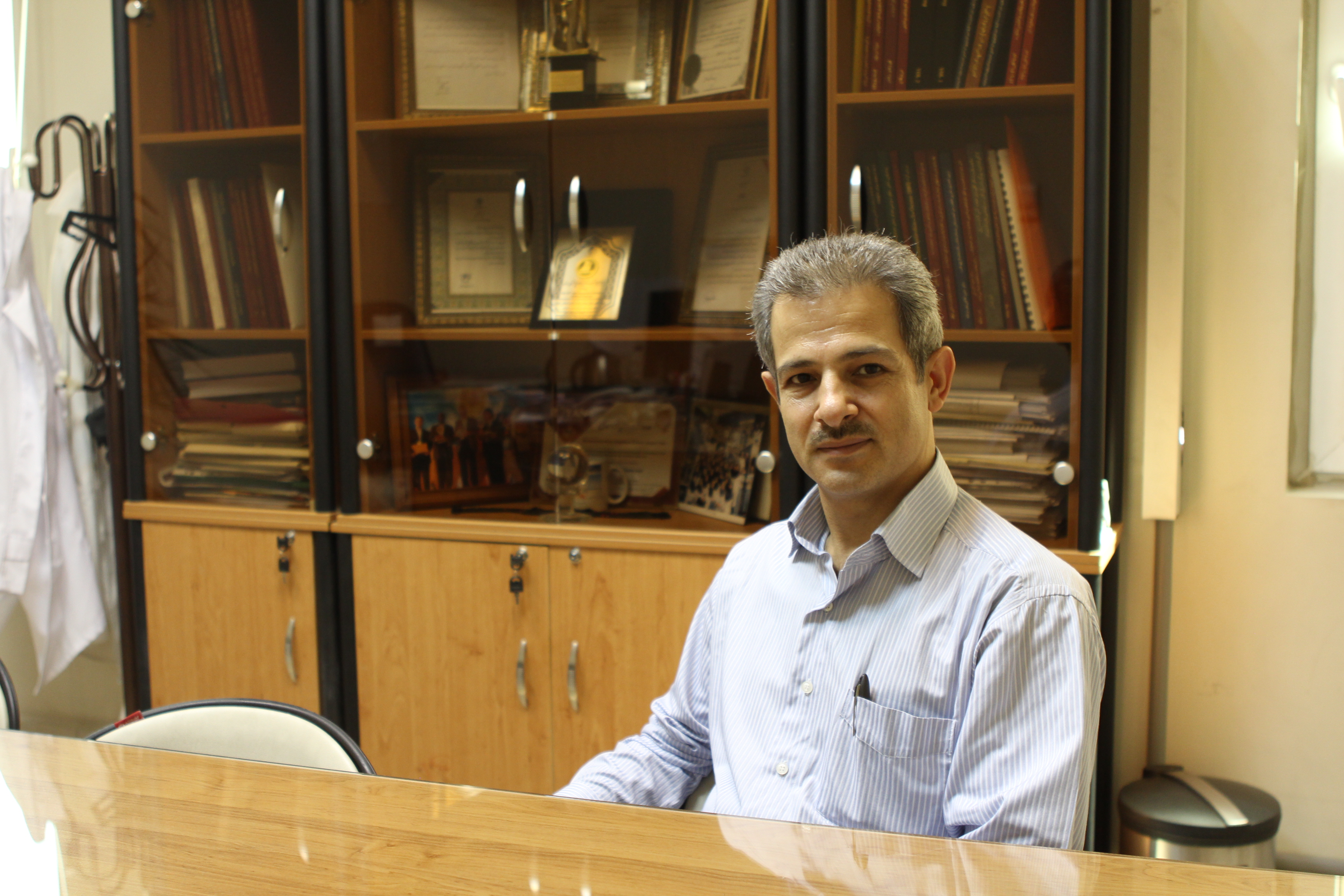
- Prof. Eslaminejad at his office
- Born: May 24, 1967 (age 59); Tehran, Iran
- Education: Tarbiat Modares University, Iran University of Medical Sciences
- Scientific career
- Fields: Biomedical engineering, tissue engineering, bone and cartilage regeneration, stem cell therapy
- Workplaces: Royan Institute
- Notable students: Arash Khojasteh,

Mohamadreza Baghaban Eslaminejad (Persian: محمدرضا باغبان اسلامی نژاد, born May 24, 1967, Tabriz, Iran) is the director of the Adult Stem Cell Lab and histology/embryology Professor at the Royan Institute where he held a multi-departmental professorship in bioengineering, tissue engineering, regenerative medicine, and stem cell therapy. Eslaminejad studies have been cited over 4000 times. He is best known for Hard Tissue Engineering (bone, cartilage, tooth) and utilizing Mesenchymal stem cells for treatment of orthopedic diseases.

He has researched numerous model organisms such as mouse, rabbit, and dog, issued in about 400 papers in international journals and conferences. Furthermore, he has contributed to more than 20 international books by writing the chapter and has written three national books. His leading research is focused on the advanced stages of the Clinical trial for utilizing Stem cell to treat patients. Prof. Baghaban Eslaminejad has won numerous Awards and serves as the Editorial Board of the Current Stem Cell Research and Therapy and the World Journal of Stem Cells.

== Background and personal life ==
Eslaminejad was born and grew up in Tabriz, Iran. He then moved to Tehran in 1986. He graduated from Iran University of Medical Sciences in 1990 with a BSc in physical therapy. He received his MSc degree in anatomy from Tarbiat Modares University in 1997. His PhD was completed in Anatomical Sciences at Tarbiat Modares University in 2004, after attending a course of research in Center for Developmental Biology, Riken, Kobe, Japan (2003-2004) then he instantly joined the stem cell department at the Royan Institute.

== Founder of stem cell lab ==
In 2004, the Adult Stem Cell laboratory and its research group had been founded by Eslaminejad. This lab aimed to utilize stem cells, especially Mesenchymal stem cells (MSCs), to treat orthopedic diseases, especially bone and cartilage defects. Focusing on the therapeutic application of MSCs by Eslaminejad to regenerate bone and cartilage defect had made adult stem cells lab and its research group one of the main leading hard tissue engineering research group in Iran and made the world's attention.

== Contributions to regenerative medicine ==
Eslaminejad has considered the different aspects of hard tissue engineering. The majority of his research serves to accelerate the regeneration process in human bone/cartilage tissue. In the last five years alone, all of his international contributions have been published in reliable journals.

In 2015, his collaboration with Johannesburg Laser Research Center has highlighted the effect of Low-level laser therapy (LLLT) and Mesenchymal stem cells (MSCs) on bone regeneration. The histological analysis revealed a statistically meaningful increase in new bone formation.

His contribution with the University of Oxford in 2016 led to introduce the PLGA coated Tricalcium phosphate (β-TCP) scaffold as the desired substrate for bone tissue engineering, which expressed Type I collagen (COL1) and RUNX2 significantly.

His interdisciplinary work in 2017 on hydrothermal treatment of Chitosan scaffolds manifested the novel nontoxic crosslinking method for cartilage tissue engineering.

Another international collaboration with the University of Amsterdam illustrated the smart delivery capacity of VEGF-Poly(N-isopropylacrylamide) loaded collagen Hydrogel led to heightened angiogenic/osteogenic differentiation.

The multicenter research with Ali Khademhosseini and AO Research Institute Davos in Switzerland has also been established by Eslaminejad. The study was designed to targeted cell therapy of Osteoarthritis diseases to prevent off-target attachment of cells.

== Awards and honors ==
Eslaminejad's Interdisciplinarity investigation has been appreciated over 6 major national and international awards. In 2006, he received first prize in the seventh Royan International Research Award for Reproductive Biomedicine and Stem Cell. In 2007, he selected as The Leading Researcher of Tehran. In 2009, he received the best researcher award from Razi Medicine Festival in the Novel Technologies section, Tehran. In 2010, National Festival for Commemorating Distinguished Researchers was named Dr. Eslaminejad as the Excellent Researcher of Iran. In 2015, he praised as the exemplary scientist and staff of the year by ACECR (The Academic Center for Education, Culture and Research). In 2018 and 2019, he was included in the list of scientific leaders of Iran and was praised. Springer Nature selected one of the Eslaminejad chapter books with the title '3D Printing in Dentistry' as one of the 2020 highlighted research.

== Executive records ==
Eslaminejad holds several executives and scientific positions at the Royan Institute:

- Director of Adult Stem Cell Laboratory
- Member of the Scientific Council of Royan Institute
- Member of the Scientific Council for the Royan Institute for Stem Cell Biology and Technology.
- Member of the Scientific Council for Departments of Stem cells and Developmental Biology
- Member of the Scientific Council for Departments of Cell Engineering
- Member of Royan Research Institute Publishing Council
