= Medical Journal of The Islamic Republic of Iran =

Medical Journal of the Islamic Republic of Iran
- Discipline: Medicine
- Language: English
- Edited by: Hamid Reza Baradaran

Publication details
- History: 1987–present
- Publisher: Iran University of Medical Sciences (Iran)
- Frequency: Continuously
- Open access: Yes
- License: Creative Commons Attribution-NonCommercial 4.0 International

Standard abbreviations
- ISO 4: Med. J. Islam. Repub. Iran

Indexing
- ISSN: 1016-1430 (print); 2251-6840 (web)
- OCLC no.: 318435558

Links
- Journal homepage; Online access; Online archive

The Medical Journal of the Islamic Republic of Iran is a peer-reviewed open-access medical journal published by the Iran University of Medical Sciences. The editor-in-chief is Hamid Baradaran (Iran University of Medical Sciences). Publishing formats include original research articles, letters to the editor, and review articles.

== History ==
The journal was established in 1987. It was published quarterly until 2014, when it switched to a continuous rhythm.

== Abstracting and indexing ==
This journal is abstracted and indexed by Directory of Open Access Journals and Scopus.
