= Hamidreza Khankeh =

Iranian health scientist (born 1967)

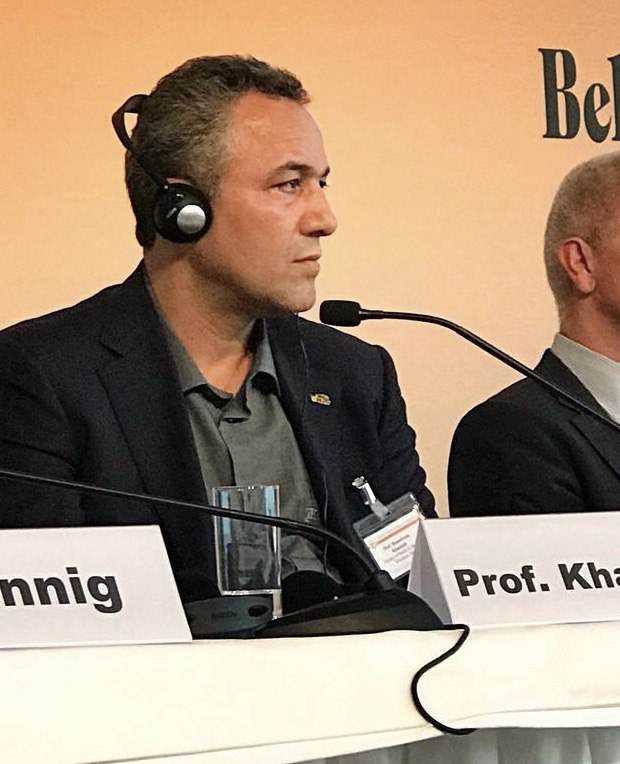
- Born: 22 December 1967 (age 58); Arak, Iran
- Education: Elementary School Hekmat; Highschool shahid Beheshti; Bachelor degree from Iran University of Medical Sciences; PhD. from Shahid Beheshti University; Postdoc from Karolinska Institute Sweden
- Known for: National Pioneer in Emergency and Disaster Health
- Scientific career
- Fields: Health in Emergency and Disaster, Qualitative Research Methodology
- Thesis: Designing a Model for Health Care Services At the Time of Disaster: A Grounded Theory Study.

Hamidreza Khankeh (born 22 December 1967) is an Iranian scientist in the field of Emergency and Disaster Health and former chancellor of the University of Social Welfare and Rehabilitation Sciences. He became known for his development of national guidelines to prepare hospitals against disasters, National Respond Framework in disasters and the integration emergency numbers in Iran. He has been a member Academy of Medical Science Iran since 2016... Khankeh has been head of department and research center of Health in Emergency and Disaster in University of Social Welfare and Rehabilitation Science Tehran since 2012. From 2017 he has held vice chancellor for National Emergency Medical Organization of Iran, national advisor for deputy of nursing in Ministry of Health in emergency and disaster and also advisor of National Disaster Management Organization and Tehran Disaster Mitigation and Management Organization (TDMMO)

== Biography ==
Hamidreza Khankeh was born in 1967 in Arak, Iran, which is located 260 km from the city of Tehran. His father Morteza is a blacksmith. When he was 18 years old, he left the college for attending Iran-Iraq War as a young volunteer health care provider and as para mad. After a few months, he got responsibilities as a clinical manager in the emergency clinics in the front line of the war. In his years at war, Khankeh came into contact with people who were from less privileged economic classes of society and he felt the difficulties and hardship that existed in Iran during war period.

He was always curious to ho help the people in disaster situations, therefore, he attempted to improve his knowledge in nursing and emergency and offer solutions for the problems faced by Disaster societies. He finished his bachelor's degree in Iran University of Medical Sciences at 1991 and at the same year he started his master's degree in Nursing Science at Shahid Beheshti University of Medical Science and Medical Education. He became a faculty member in University of Social Welfare and Rehabilitation Science Tehran from 1995. He got his Ph.D. in field of emergencies and disasters health from Iran University of Medical Sciences 2007. His thesis was about designing a model for health care services at the time of disaster: A Grounded Theory Study. Khankeh decided to improve his knowledge where he continued his Post-Doctoral under supervision of Prof. Maaret Castren at Department of Clinical Science and Education Sweden in field of emergencies and disasters health focusing on qualitative paradigm special using Grounded Theory. After expanding his knowledge, he initiated, designed and developed some important national research projects. His special focuses are on theoretical and basic and applied disaster research in the field of emergencies and disasters health, on qualitative designing in field of emergency and disaster and hospital emergency risk management programming. He has been as a deputy of research and technology in University of Social Welfare and Rehabilitation Science between 2014 and 2017. Khankeh is affiliated professor in departments of clinical science and education at Karolinska Institute in Sweden, visiting professor Leipzig University in Germany and University of Gdansk in Poland, he gives international and national lectures at congresses and gives courses on topics related to emergency and emergencies and qualitative methodology. From April 2020 he has been accepted as experiences scientific researcher by Alexander von Humboldt Foundation. He will do research about Disaster Risk Reduction in Tehran (Capital of Iran) by improving disaster Risk understanding and social trust in Free University of Berlin.

Khankeh lives in Tehran, he is married and has one daughter.

== Significant achievements ==
When Khankeh was as deputy of research and technology in 2014-2017 at University of Social Welfare and Rehabilitation Science he improved the rank of this university in the field of research and technology to 7 among 25 medical education universities in Iran

Khankeh when he expend some months for research in field of emergencies and disasters coordination at University of Hyogo in Research Institute of Nursing Care for People and Community he realized that his country needs to focus on coordination in a disaster situation. When he backed form Japan he started to develop disaster risk management in Iran in field of health and he has done some interventions base on an international recommendations like the Hyogo framework for action 2005 and Sendai Framework for Disaster Risk Reduction for action 2015 to reduce the amount of disaster risk in the country. Therefore, Khankeh from 2011 tried to develop a national guideline to prepare hospitals against disasters and this guideline is known as a national guideline in every part of Iran. Nowadays this guideline has been included in hospitals accreditation system and all hospitals including governmental and private hospitals, even military hospitals have to follow criteria. This national guideline has been approved by the World Health Organization.

Khankeh and his team in 2015 base on order of president of National Disaster Management Organization initiated National Response Framework National Emergency Operation Plan, National Disaster Leveling in disasters and National Guideline for Exercise in emergencies and disaster situations and distributed in different parts of Iran. This national response framework has been developed base on four level of the disaster which categorized disaster in Iran from E0 which means no emergency until E-three it means national emergency (E0, E1, E2, E3, until E4).

Khankeh tried to develop a national single emergency number to integrate all emergency numbers (SOS) in Iran. In Iran there are several organizations which are involved in the field of emergency and disaster such as Iranian medical emergency medical services, Iranian Red Crescent Society, Iranian fire department, municipalities, police department, and social welfare and the other involved organizations they all have their own emergency numbers. Nowadays this national project has been ordered by President to implement as pilot under supervision of him in one of the cities of Iran which have the most important highway in the country with the highest rate of accident. Khankeh has been selected as the best scientific researcher of the year by Iranian Academy of Medical Sciences in February 2020.

He has been assigned as a head of national technical committee of COVID-19 and also head of Social Observery of COVID-19 in Iran.[28]

== Publications ==
His publications include Persian- and English-language books as publisher and author on the emergency and disaster health and more than 180 peer-reviewed articles. Khankeh and his research team published the first National Tool for Hospital Preparedness Against Disasters and Hazard and Risk Assessment Toolkit for Disaster & Health which they are one of the main references book in this area. He is editor in chief of Health in Emergencies & Disasters Quarterly(HDQ)
