= Crossbite =

Left-right misalignment of upper and lower teeth

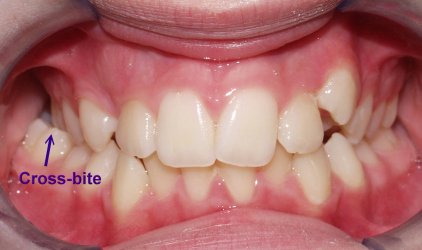
- Unilateral posterior crossbite
- Specialty: Orthodontics

In dentistry, crossbite is a form of malocclusion where a tooth (or teeth) has a more buccal or lingual position (that is, the tooth is either closer to the cheek or to the tongue) than its corresponding antagonist tooth in the upper or lower dental arch. In other words, crossbite is a lateral misalignment of the dental arches.

== Anterior crossbite ==
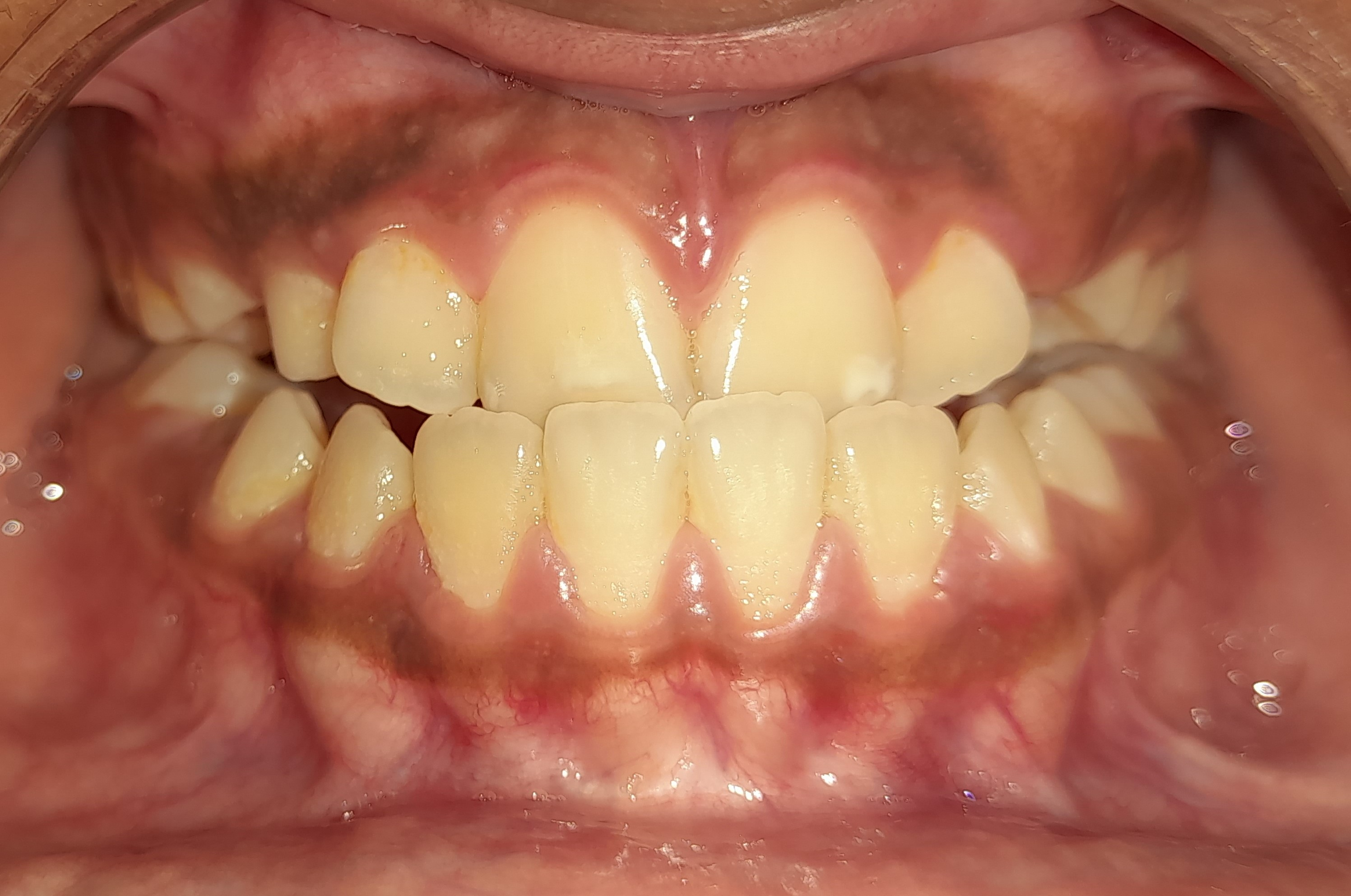
Class 1 with anterior crossbite

An anterior crossbite can be referred as negative overjet, and is typical of class III skeletal relations (prognathism).

=== Primary/mixed dentitions ===
An anterior crossbite in a child with baby teeth or mixed dentition may happen due to either dental misalignment or skeletal misalignment. Dental causes may be due to displacement of one or two teeth, where skeletal causes involve either mandibular hyperplasia, maxillary hypoplasia or combination of both.

==== Dental crossbite ====
An anterior crossbite due to dental component involves displacement of either maxillary central or lateral incisors lingual to their original erupting positions. This may happen due to delayed eruption of the primary teeth leading to permanent teeth moving lingual to their primary predecessors. This will lead to anterior crossbite where upon biting, upper teeth are behind the lower front teeth and may involve few or all frontal incisors. In this type of crossbite, the maxillary and mandibular proportions are normal to each other and to the cranial base. Another reason that may lead to a dental crossbite is crowding in the maxillary arch. Permanent teeth will tend to erupt lingual to the primary teeth in presence of crowding. Side-effects caused by dental crossbite can be increased recession on the buccal of lower incisors and higher chance of inflammation in the same area. Another term for an anterior crossbite due to dental interferences is Pseudo Class III Crossbite or Malocclusion.

==== Single tooth crossbite ====
Single tooth crossbites can occur due to uneruption of a primary teeth in a timely manner which causes permanent tooth to erupt in a different eruption pattern which is lingual to the primary tooth. Single tooth crossbites are often fixed by using a finger-spring based appliances. This type of spring can be attached to a removable appliance which is used by patient every day to correct the tooth position.

==== Skeletal crossbite ====
An anterior crossbite due to skeletal reasons will involve a deficient maxilla and a more hyperplastic or overgrown mandible. People with this type of crossbite will have dental compensation which involves proclined maxillary incisors and retroclined mandibular incisors. A proper diagnosis can be made by having a person bite into their centric relation will show mandibular incisors ahead of the maxillary incisors, which will show the skeletal discrepancy between the two jaws.

== Posterior crossbite ==
Bjork defined posterior crossbite as a malocclusion where the buccal cusps of canine, premolar and molar of upper teeth occlude lingually to the buccal cusps of canine, premolar and molar of lower teeth. Posterior crossbite is often correlated to a narrow maxilla and upper dental arch. A posterior crossbite can be unilateral, bilateral, single-tooth or entire segment crossbite. Posterior crossbite has been reported to occur between 7–23% of the population. The most common type of posterior crossbite to occur is the unilateral crossbite which occurs in 80% to 97% of the posterior crossbite cases. Posterior crossbites also occur most commonly in primary and mixed dentition. This type of crossbite usually presents with a functional shift of the mandible towards the side of the crossbite. Posterior crossbite can occur due to either skeletal, dental or functional abnormalities. One of the common reasons for development of posterior crossbite is the size difference between maxilla and mandible, where maxilla is smaller than mandible. Posterior crossbite can result due to

- Upper Airway Obstruction where people with "adenoid faces" who have trouble breathing through their nose. They have an open bite malocclusion and present with development of posterior crossbite.
- Prolong digit or suckling habits which can lead to constriction of maxilla posteriorly
- Prolong pacifier use (beyond age 4)

== Connections with TMD ==
=== Unilateral posterior crossbite ===
Unilateral crossbite involves one side of the arch. The most common cause of unilateral crossbite is a narrow maxillary dental arch. This can happen due to habits such as digit sucking, prolonged use of pacifier or upper airway obstruction. Due to the discrepancy between the maxillary and mandibular arch, neuromuscular guidance of the mandible causes mandible to shift towards the side of the crossbite. This is also known as Functional mandibular shift. This shift can become structural if left untreated for a long time during growth, leading to skeletal asymmetries. Unilateral crossbites can present with following features in a child

- Lower midline deviation to the crossbite side
- Class 2 Subdivision relationships
- Temporomandibular disorders

== Treatment ==
A child with posterior crossbite should be treated immediately if the child shifts their mandible on closing, which is often seen in a unilateral crossbite as mentioned above. The best age to treat a child with crossbite is in their mixed dentition when their palatal sutures have not fused to each other. Palatal expansion allows more space in an arch to relieve crowding and correct posterior crossbite. The correction can include any type of palatal expanders that will expand the palate which resolves the narrow constriction of the maxilla. There are several therapies that can be used to correct a posterior crossbite: braces, 'Z' spring or cantilever spring, quad helix, removable plates, clear aligner therapy, or a Delaire mask. The correct therapy should be decided by the orthodontist depending on the type and severity of the crossbite.

One of the keys in diagnosing the anterior crossbite due to skeletal vs dental causes is diagnosing a CR-CO shift in a patient. An adolescent presenting with anterior crossbite may be positioning their mandible forward into centric occlusion (CO) due to the dental interferences. Thus finding their occlusion in centric relation (CR) is key in diagnosis. For anterior crossbite, if their CO matches their CR then the patient truly has a skeletal component to their crossbite. If the CR shows a less severe class 3 malocclusion or teeth not in anterior crossbite, this may mean that their anterior crossbite results due to dental interferences.

Goal to treat unilateral crossbites should definitely include removal of occlusal interferences and elimination of the functional shift. Treating posterior crossbites early may help prevent the occurrence of Temporomandibular joint pathology.

Unilateral crossbites can also be diagnosed and treated properly by using a Deprogramming splint. This splint has flat occlusal surface which causes the muscles to deprogram themselves and establish new sensory engrams. When the splint is removed, a proper centric relation bite can be diagnosed from the bite.

=== Self-correction ===
Literature states that very few crossbites tend to self-correct which often justify the treatment approach of correcting these bites as early as possible. Only 0–9% of crossbites self-correct. Lindner et al. reported that 50% of crossbites were corrected in 76 four-year-old children.

== See also ==
- List of palatal expanders
- Palatal expansion
- Malocclusion
