= Auricular splint =

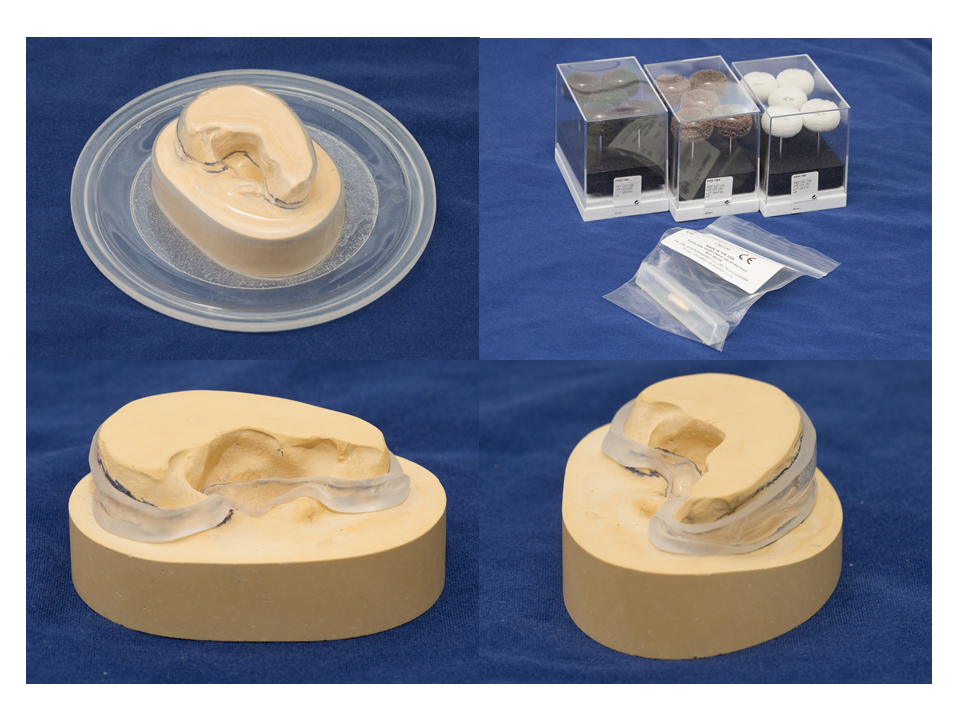
- Auricular splint

An auricular splint (AS) or ear splint is a custom-made medical device that is used to maintain auricular projection and dimensions following second stage auricular reconstruction. The AS is made from ethylene-vinyl acetate (EVA), which is typically used to make custom-made mouthguards and was developed by a team from Great Ormond Street Hospital in the United Kingdom.

== History ==
The auricle is typically reconstructed using autogenous cartilage, which is the most reliable material for producing the best results with the least complications. Cartilage from the knee and contralateral auricular cartilage from the concha have also been reported but costal cartilage is typically used as it is the only donor site that provides sufficient tissue to fabricate the complete auricular framework. The four main elements to consider when assessing the final reconstructed auricle are:

- The symmetry of size of the auricle
- The projection of the auricle
- The adequacy of the temporoauricular sulcus (the depression behind the auricle next to the head)
- The contour of the different subunits of the reconstructed auricle

In order to prevent compression during sleep and to prevent the grafted skin from contracting, the use of a Foley catheter, Reston Foam, silicone foam, polysiloxane and dental impression compound have been described. The auricular splint was developed with the aim of overcoming the drawbacks associated with these methods.

== Technique ==
The auricular splint (AS) is easy to fit and remove, self-retaining, lightweight and easy to camouflage due to its transparency. The AS is made from ethylene-vinyl acetate (EVA), which is inert and non-toxic, non-absorbent, sufficiently elastic to allow it to fitted and removed but sufficiently rigid to avoid breakage.

The concept was first presented at the 2nd Congress of the International Society for Auricular Reconstruction in Beijing, China in September 2017 and published in the Annals of Plastic Surgery the following year.

The first stage involves taking an impression of the reconstructed auricle with Soft Putty Elastomer, which is cast in dental stone to make a model of the reconstructed auricle. The splint is made by thermoforming a 4mm sheet of transparent ethylene-vinyl acetate (EVA) over the stone model. The edges of the splint are trimmed and polished using the outline on the model as a guide.

The splint has been found to maintain auricular projection and other key dimensions up to the six-month post-operative follow-up.
