= CMDS =

CMDS may refer to:

- classical multidimensional scaling (CMDS)
- Center for Media, Data and Society (CMDS), School of Public Policy (SPP), Central European University (CEU)
- Center for Media, Data and Society (CMDS), Media and Journalism Research Center (MJRC), University of Santiago de Compostela
- Colégio Marista Dom Silvério (CMDS; Portuguese: Dom Silverio Marist School), Belo Horizonte, Minas Gerais, Brazil; a private Marist primary and secondary school
- Comic Media Distribution Service (CMDS), a British distributor of comics, predecessor of Titan Distributors
- Christian Medical and Dental Society (CMDS), Canada
- Countermeasure Dispensing System (CMDS), flare/chaff/decoy dispensers; see also List of military electronics of the United States

== See also ==
- CMD (disambiguation)
