= Emerson C. Angell =

American Dentist who is known as the father of the rapid maxillary expansion

Emerson Colon Angell
- Born: August 3, 1822
- Known for: Father of Rapid maxillary expansion in Orthodontic treatment
- Medical career
- Profession: Dentist

Emerson Colon Angell (1822–1903) was an American dentist who is known as the father of the rapid maxillary expansion. He published a paper in Dental Cosmos in 1860 in which he described this technique.

== Life ==
He was born and grew up in Scituate, Rhode Island. He was the 7th generation of his family from Rhode Island. He was a descendant of Thomas Angell. Emerson learned agriculture and mechanics from his father. He began studying dentistry in 1846, under mentorship of people in the community due to the lack of any formal education available at that time. He eventually practiced in Rhode Island, New York City and San Francisco.

== Dentistry ==
Emerson first published a paper on expansion of palate in San Francisco Medical Press (SFMP) in January 1860. This initial paper described the expansion of palate with deciduous teeth, which was later followed by another paper on the permanent teeth dentition in SFMP. His first paper was a case report which focused on a 14-year-old patient with a posterior Crossbite. Emerson fitted this patient with an appliance in his maxillary arch and gave patients instructions to turn the screw every day. Emerson claimed that expansion was achieved in 2 weeks by separation of maxilla along the Midpalatal suture. Dr. Angell faced much criticism from people in the field of dentistry at that point.
