= Medical device reporting =

Medical device reporting (MDR) is the procedure for the Food and Drug Administration to get significant medical device adverse events information from manufacturers, importers and user facilities, so these issues can be detected and corrected quickly, and the same lot of that product may be recalled. Consumers and health professionals report any adverse event caused by the device to MedWatch program for reporting significant adverse events or product problems with medical products.

== History ==
Legislation requiring device user facility reporting was enacted by Congress to increase the amount of information the Food and Drug Administration (FDA) and device manufacturers receive about problems with medical devices. Although manufacturers and importers of medical devices have been required since 1984 to report to FDA all device-related deaths, serious injuries, and certain malfunctions, numerous studies have shown widespread underreporting. A 1986 General Accounting Office (GAO) study showed that less than one percent of device problems occurring in hospitals are reported to the FDA, and that the more serious the problem with a device, the less likely it was to be reported. A GAO follow-up study in 1989 concluded that despite full implementation of the Medical Device Reporting (MDR) regulation, serious shortcomings still existed.

Under the Safe Medical Devices Act of 1990 (SMDA), device user facilities must report device-related deaths to the FDA and the manufacturer, if known. The facilities must also report device-related serious injuries to the manufacturer, or to the FDA if the manufacturer is not known. In addition, SMDA also required that device user facilities submit to FDA, on a semiannual basis, a summary of all reports submitted during that time period. The device user facility reporting section of SMDA became effective on November 28, 1991.

To implement SMDA, FDA published a tentative final rule in the Federal Register on November 26, 1991, inviting comments; over 300 comments were received. On June 16, 1992, the President signed into law the Medical Devices Amendments of 1992 (Public Law 102–300) making minor changes. A final rule published in the Federal Register on December 11, 1995, addresses the comments received and the mandated changes.

== Update on FDAMA ==
The Food and Drug Administration Modernization Act (FDAMA) made four changes that affected MDR, effective 2/19/98:

- Manufacturers and distributors/importers do not need to submit annual certification.
- Domestic distributors are no longer required to file MDR reports, but must continue to maintain complaint files.
- Importers (initial distributors for devices manufactured overseas and imported into the USA) must continue to file MDR reports.
- User facilities must now file an annual report instead of semiannual reports, and Sentinel reporting by user facilities was proposed.

== See also ==
- Post-market surveillance
