= Annals of Plastic Surgery =

- Discipline: Plastic surgery
- Language: English
- Edited by: William C. Lineaweaver

Publication details
- History: 1978–present
- Publisher: Lippincott Williams & Wilkins
- Frequency: Monthly
- Open access: Hybrid
- Impact factor: 1.5 (2022)

Standard abbreviations
- ISO 4: Ann. Plast. Surg.

Indexing
- CODEN: APCSD4
- ISSN: 0148-7043 (print); 1536-3708 (web)
- OCLC no.: 959782531

Links
- Journal homepage; Online access; Online archive

Annals of Plastic Surgery is a monthly peer-reviewed medical journal covering all aspects of plastic and reconstructive surgery. It is published by Lippincott Williams & Wilkins and the editor-in-chief is William C. Lineaweaver (Joseph M. Still Burn and Reconstructive Center, Brandon, Mississippi, United States).

== Abstracting and indexing ==
The journal is abstracted and indexed in CAB Abstracts, Current Contents/Clinical Medicine, Embase, Index Medicus/MEDLINE/PubMed, Science Citation Index Expanded, and Scopus. According to the Journal Citation Reports, the journal has a 2022 impact factor of 1.5.

== See also ==
- List of medical journals
