= Chromo-modal dispersion =

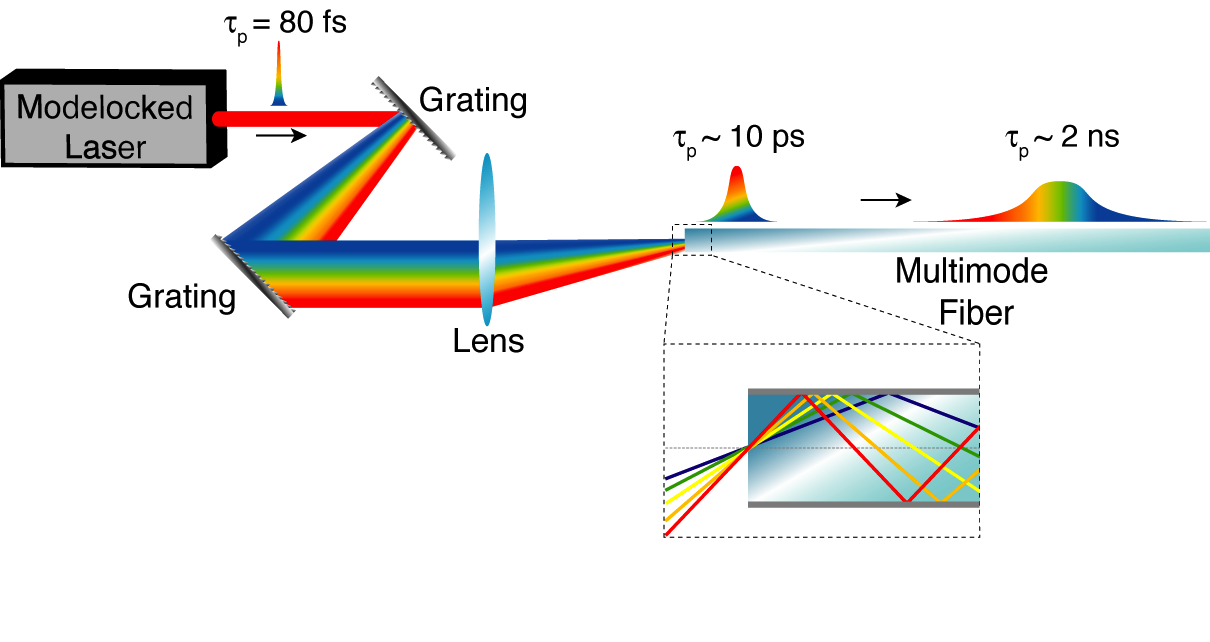
Schematic diagram of the chromo-modal dispersion device. Light is incident upon two parallel plane gratings, which disperse and collimate the optical spectrum. Angular dispersion is then applied to the spectrum using a lens. The input facet of a multimode fiber is placed at the lens focus such that the various spectral components are coupled into different fiber modes. The figure inset illustrates how different spectral components are coupled into and propagate in the multimode fiber. The dashed line represents the optic axis of the fiber. Although the configuration shown provides anomalous dispersion, the CMD can be tuned throughout both the anomalous and normal dispersive regimes by adjusting the alignment of the lens and fiber relative to the spatially dispersed spectrum.

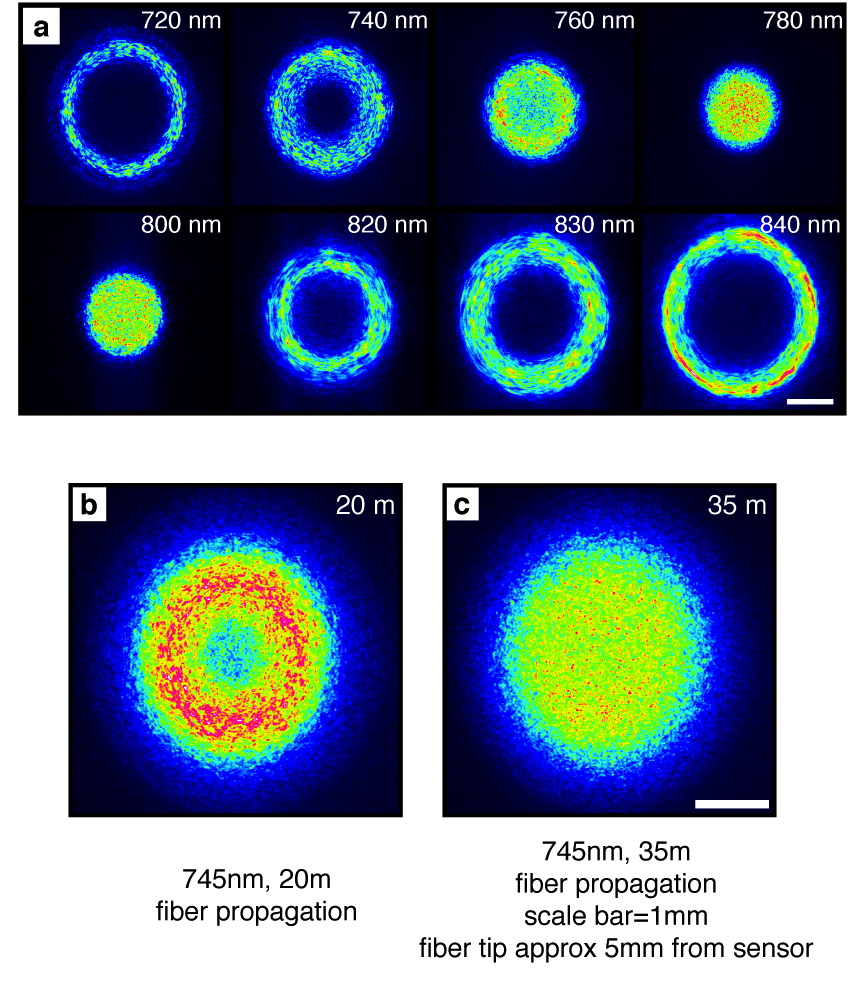
Mode profiles at the output of the CMD fiber for alignment position #1, measured 5 mm from the output fiber facet. (a) Mode profiles recorded using various excitation wavelengths. (b) Mode profile using 745-nm excitation after propagating through 20 m of 200-μm core diameter fiber. (c) Mode profile using 745-nm excitation after propagating through 35 m of the same fiber. Blurring in the output mode profile indicates the coupling length has been reached. The scale bar in all cases is 1 mm.

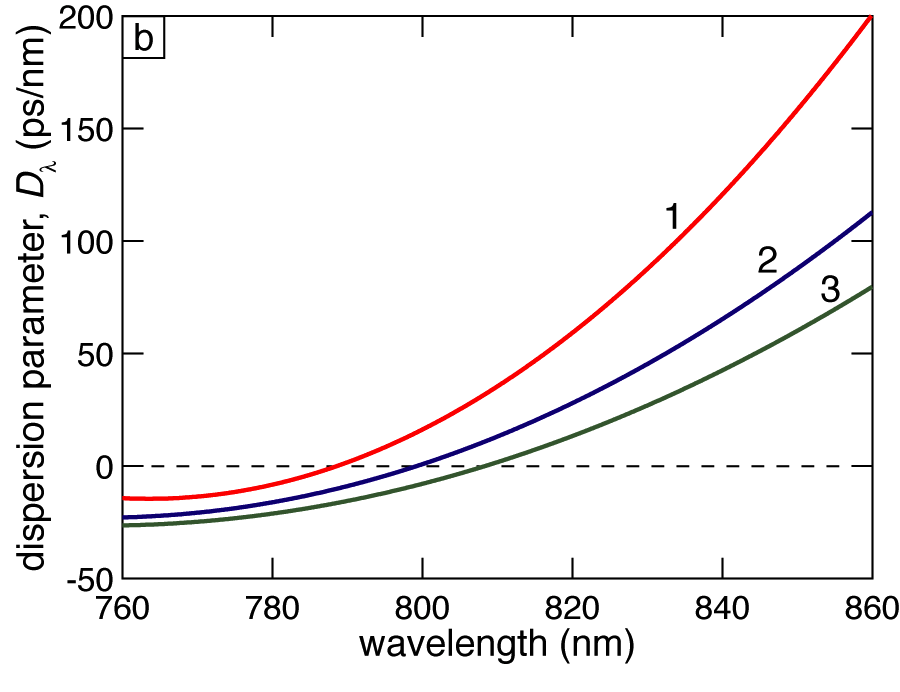
Dispersion parameter for three different alignments of the CMD. Translating the lens and fiber facet in the horizontal direction relative to the incident spatially dispersed spectrum shifts the CMD's zero dispersion wavelength.

Chromo-modal dispersion (CMD) results from exciting various modes of a multimode waveguide with unique spectral components of a broadband optical signal. Modal dispersion during propagation in the waveguide then provides group velocity dispersion to the signal. The large modal dispersion inherent to multimode waveguides enables the dispersion per unit length of a chromo-modal dispersion device to be several orders of magnitude higher than that of diffraction grating or dispersion compensating fiber-based dispersive elements.

== Applications ==
The ability to control chromatic dispersion is paramount in applications where the optical pulsewidth is critical, such as chirped pulse amplification and fiber-optic communications.

== Other devices ==
Typically, devices used to generate large amounts (>100 ps/nm) of chromatic dispersion are based on diffraction gratings, chirped fiber Bragg gratings, or dispersion compensating fiber. Unfortunately, these dispersive elements suffer from one or more of the following restrictions:

1. Limited operational bandwidth
2. Limited total dispersion
3. Low peak power handling
4. Large spatial footprint.

== Construction ==
The chromo-modal dispersion device is constructed by combining the angular dispersion of diffraction gratings with the modal dispersion of a multimode waveguide.

== Advantages ==
The large dispersion and small footprint of the device make the chromo-modal dispersion device potentially useful for on-chip dispersion compensation using optical components such as integrated gratings and planar multimode waveguides. The advantage of physical compactness, combined with the magnitude and tunability of its dispersion suggest its potential use as a versatile tool for pulse stretching or compression in a variety of applications in which the capabilities of singlemode fiber or diffraction grating-based dispersive elements will not suffice.
