= Lip bumper =

Appliance used in dentistry

A lip bumper is a dental appliance used in orthodontics, for various purposes to correct a dentition by preventing the pressure from the soft tissue. Lip bumpers are usually used in orthodontic treatment where the patient has a crowded maxillary or mandibular teeth in an arch.

== Orthodontics ==
A lip bumper can be used for expansion of the teeth in the mandibular arch. In orthodontics, tooth-size discrepancy phenomenon occurs when there is crowding presented. As a treatment, either extractions of teeth or expansion of the arch can be done to correct the tooth-size discrepancy. A lip bumper is placed in front of the anterior teeth to keep the pressure of the lips and cheeks away from the front teeth and back teeth respectively. As cited by Werner et al., the lip bumper can be used for reducing lower anterior crowding, increasing arch circumference, and move the permanent lower molars distally for the purpose of keeping anchorage.

Specific changes that occur because of this appliance including anterior teeth tipping forward, molar teeth tipping backwards and the increase in width of the arch formed by the lower teeth. The wire is kept 1.5–2.0 mm (0.059–0.079 in) from the front surface of the anterior teeth. Recently, advances have been made to use lip bumpers with mini-screws for distalization of the upper back teeth.

A Korn lip bumper is a maxillary lip bumper which was developed by Korn and Shapiro. This lip bumper is made up of .040in stainless steel wire and involves multiple loops. This lip bumper sits high in the maxillary vestibule and 2-3mm away from the attached gingiva. This type of bumper is often used with a bite plate.

== Side-effects ==
Side-effects caused by lip bumpers include the possible disruption in the eruption pattern of the 2nd molars in the mandibular arch. The pressure of the lips on the lip bumper, causes the 1st molar to tip distally which effects and causes the impaction of the 2nd molar.
