= List of palatal expanders =

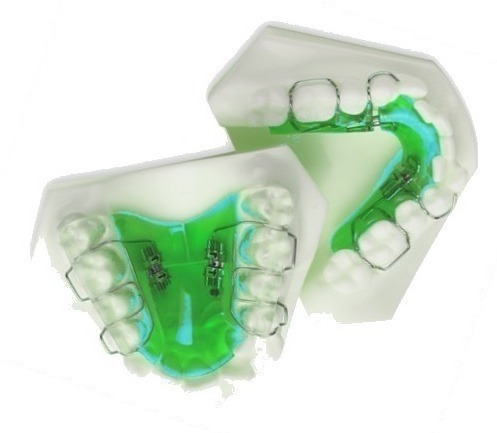
Upper and lower jaw functional expanders

This article lists different types of expanders that are available for the process of palatal expansion in the field of orthodontics. There can be many types of transverse dimension appliances. These appliances can be used to achieve expansion in the maxillary arch; there are devices for mandibular expansion or lower expansion too. In past many years, different types of appliances have been made. These types are: tissue-borne, tooth-borne, slow maxillary expansion, rapid maxillary expansion, and bone-anchored.

== Types of expanders ==
=== Tissue-borne expander ===
Tissue supported expanders allow the forces to be applied directly to the tissues of palatal mucosa instead of teeth. The most common type of tissue-borne expander is known as the Haas Appliance. This appliance was popularized by Andrew Haas in 1961. This appliance involves bands placed on maxillary first premolar and first molars on each side. Haas appliance has palatal acrylic that is in contact with palatal mucosa. Inside the acrylic there is a jackscrew that is embedded for patients to make turns to expand the device. In addition to the acrylic, support wires also extend from the premolars and molars to the appliance to add additional rigidity to the appliance.

Proponents of tissue-borne expansion believe that more bodily movement and less dental tipping is produced when an acrylic palatal coverage is added to the appliance. They believe that forces are dissipated through the mucosa and teeth. One of the disadvantages of this type of appliance is it leading to irritation of palatal mucosa.

=== Tooth-borne expander ===
Tooth supported expanders allow the forces to be applied directly to the teeth of maxillary arch instead of the tissue. The most common tooth-borne expander is known as the Hyrax (hygienic rapid expander) or Biedermann appliance. This appliance was developed by Bidermann. Hyrax is also known as the "hygienic appliance" because it does not lead to irritation of tissues due to the absence of palatal acrylic. The appliance is made mostly of stainless steel and includes bands being placed on maxillary first premolars and first molars. The appliance includes a jackscrew in the middle for patients to turn for expansion purposes. This appliance also has rigid wires extending from appliance to premolars and molars. The tooth-borne expanders can be divided into the Bonded vs. Banded Type of expanders. Hyrax appliance falls under the banded type appliance.

One of the concerns of this appliance is that due to the forces being applied only to the teeth, there may more dental tipping than skeletal expansion.

=== Bone-borne expander ===
Bone supported expanders allow the forces to be applied directly to the maxilla. Bone-borne expanders fall into two categories, MARPE and palatal distractors. Common types of MARPE include MSE (maxillary skeletal expansion), and DOME (distraction osteogenesis maxillary expansion). MARPE appliances anchor to the palatal vault area of the maxilla using 4-6 mini-screws (or TADs) which allows for expansion in adults as well as prevents tipping as is common in tooth-borne expanders. Unlike Surgically Assisted Rapid Palatal Expansion (SARPE), due to the absence of LeFort 1 osteotomy significant expansion of not only the maxilla but also the pharynx and nasal cavity can be achieved, which can be very effective in treating obstructive sleep apnea.

== Comparison of different types ==
Many studies have been performed and published regarding the comparison of these two different types of appliance. The discrepancy that exists between different studies that has to do with the type of appliances they used in each category. A tooth-borne appliance can be designed in many different ways and same with tissue-borne appliance. The expanding protocol, retention protocol, exact timepoint of when the expansion was measured are some of the factors that can influence the results between different studies. Therefore, when evaluating studies and making conclusions, it is important to keep these confounding factors in mind. Information here may be outdated within 5–10 years as new RCTs, systematic reviews & meta-analysis will be done and they may produce different results then what are stated below.

=== Tissue-borne vs. tooth-borne expansion ===
In 2005 Garib et al., stated in their study that tooth-borne (Hyrax) and tooth tissue-borne (Haas-type) expanders tended to produce similar orthopedic effects. In both methods, RME led to buccal movement of the maxillary posterior teeth, by tipping and bodily translation. They also mentioned that the second premolars displayed more buccal tipping than the supporting teeth and this could be due to 2nd premolars not being banded to the appliance. Another study performed by Weissheimer et al., which was a randomized control trial, stated that both the appliances were efficient in correcting a transverse maxillary deficiency. Both the appliances showed pure skeletal expansion which was greater than actual dental expansion. The Hyrax-type expander produced greater orthopedic effects than did the Haas-type expander, but this effect was less than 0.5 mm per side and might not be clinically significant.

=== Tooth-borne vs. bone-borne expansion ===
A study published by Lin et al. in 2015 found that for patients in late adolescence, bone-borne expanders produced greater orthopedic effects and fewer dento-alveolar side effects compared to the hyrax expanders. However, a study published by Lagravere et al. in 2010, stated that there was no difference between the bone-borne and tooth-borne expansion devices. Both types of expanders showed similar results and that the greatest changes were seen in the transverse dimension, changes in the vertical and anteroposterior dimensions were negligible. A 2019 review found that both forms of expansion produced similar results.

=== Rapid vs. slow expansion ===
A study published by Martina et al. stated that rapid maxillary expansion is not more effective than slow maxillary expansion in expanding the maxilla in patients with posterior crossbite. It is important to keep in mind that different studies use different rapid and slow expansion devices and thus comparability between studies is difficult. A systematic review done by Zhou et al. stated that slow maxillary expansion was superior to rapid maxillary expansion in expanding molar region of maxillary arch, but no difference was found when comparing their effectiveness in maxillary anterior region.

== List of expanders ==
- MICRO2/4 AWS
- UxL Expander
- Arnold appliance
- Bionator appliance
- Butterfly expander
- Coffin spring
- Crozat appliance
- Derichsweiler appliance
- Double-hinged expander (Alt-RAMEC Technique)
- Dresden-distractor
- Expansion screw
- Fan-shaped maxillary expander
- Fixed-fan gear appliance
- Frankel appliance
- Goshgarian palatal arch
- Haas expander
- Hilgers palatal expander
- Hyrax expander
- Issacson appliance
- Lower Schwarz appliance
- Niti palatal expander
- Porter W expander
- Quad helix
- Rapid palatal expander
- Reverse loop palatal arch
- Skeletal expander
- Slim gear appliance
- Spring jet
- Super screw appliance
- Transpalatal arch (TPA)
- W arch
- Y plate
