= Surgically assisted rapid palatal expansion =

- Other names: Surgically assisted rapid maxillary expansion, SARPE, SARME
- Specialty: Oral and maxillofacial surgery, orthodontics

Surgically assisted rapid palatal expansion (SARPE), also known as surgically assisted rapid maxillary expansion (SARME), is a technique in the field of orthodontics which is used to expand the maxillary arch. This technique is a combination of both Oral and Maxillofacial Surgery and Orthodontics. This procedure is primarily done in adult patients whose maxillary sutures are fused and cannot be expanded via other techniques.

== History ==
Orthodontic expansion was first described by Emersen Angell in the 1860s. Kole in 1959 was the first person to speak about the procedure of corticotomy in adults with maxillary constriction. Brown first described the surgical technique for SARPE in 1938. Steinhauser first described the technique involving the segmental left/right split of maxilla along with placement of the graft in 1972.

== Indications ==
- Skeletal maturity or adult patients
- Fused intermaxillary suture
- Transverse maxillary hypoplasia
- Bilateral posterior crossbite
- Previous failure of use of any other expansion devices
- Dental crowding due to lack of space in the maxilla to accommodate all the teeth of the upper arch
- Obstructive sleep apnea (in patients with a narrow palate)

== Procedure ==
SARPE is performed to address the transverse dimension changes in a patient. Sometimes this surgery is followed by Le Fort 1 in a second surgery to address the vertical and the anterior-posterior changes. Between the two surgeries, a patient's constricted maxillary arch is expanded with the rapid maxillary expander device placed in the maxilla. For the first surgery, under local anaesthesia and iv sedation or general anesthesia, a patient first goes through Le Fort fracture of skull without the downfracture of maxilla. The oral surgeon also performs the midpalatal osteotomy to allow the break in the inter-maxillary suture. The surgeon, while performing the LeFort 1 osteotomy, may separate the pterygoid plates during this procedure. This separation of the plates is termed as Pterygomaxillary disjunction (PMD). Some of the surgeons are cautious in their approach to separate the pterygoid processes due to a risk of injury to pterygoid plexus.

Sangsari et al. published a systematic review and a meta-analysis in 2016 which studied the effects of PMD on the outcome of SARPE. From the three studies that were included in their criteria, they concluded that the literature is inconclusive regarding the effect of PMD on the outcomes of SARPE and that further controlled trials are needed.

== Stability of procedure ==
Chamberland and Profitt in 2011 published a paper in AJODO which looked at long-term and short-term effects of SARPE procedure. The procedure of SARPE was done with pterygoid plate separation to achieve the transverse expansion of the maxilla. The authors observed skeletal changes of about 3–4mm and these changes were stable. In an earlier study published in 2008, the same authors stated that about one-third of the transverse dental expansion obtained with SARPE is lost, however the skeletal expansion remains the same. They also stated that post-surgical relapse with SARPE was similar to the changes in dental arch dimensions after non-surgical rapid palatal expansion, and also quite similar to dental arch changes after segmental maxillary osteotomy for expansion. Therefore, the stability of the procedure is not superior to other known expansion techniques.

Contrary to the newer studies, a study performed in 1997 by Northway et al. stated that the long-term buccogingival expansion was more acceptable in adults expanded with surgical augmentation than in those expanded orthopedically. However, a setback of this study was that the measurements were dental on dental models of patients, and not PA Cephalograms that were used in the study done by Profitt.

== Disadvantages ==
- Unaesthetic period after the expansion with RME
- Implementation of palatal expander post-operatively
- Patient compliance is necessary
- Second surgery likely
