= Medical Council of Iran =

- Formation: 1968
- Origins: 1960
- Website: irimc.org

The Medical Council of the Islamic Republic of Iran (IRIMC) (Persian: سازمان نظام پزشکی ایران) is a non-governmental organization (NGO) which is responsible for licensing healthcare professionals in Iran. The Iranian Medical Council is the recognized trade union for all of its registered members. IRIMC is the umbrella organization which regulates bi or multilateral collaborations between Iranian healthcare professionals and other organizations. As the main national regulatory body for healthcare professionals, IRIMC oversees doctors and other licensed health workers to ensure that they fulfil their legal duty to maintain professional competence. This regulatory organization has the power to issue a warning to doctors as well as certain allied health workers, suspend and even revoke their license to practice.

== History ==
In 1964, the Medical Council was first legislated by the Iranian Parliament which has been amended eight times in the following years. The last amendment was in 2004 when IRIMC legislation was approved by the country's Guardian Council of the Constitution.

On 1 October 2021, Dr Mohammad Raeiszadeh has been elected with 150 votes as the President of Iranian Medical Council in the new term.

IRIMC main bodies are as follows:

1. The General Assembly
2. The Supreme Council
3. The President
4. The Board of Directors of Medical Council Branches
5. The Disciplinary Committees who examine the guild and professional violations of healthcare professionals and affiliated occupations
6. Inspectors
7. Welfare and Cooperation Fund

Since 1996 CME has been mandatory for all health professionals. Administered by the Ministry of Health and Medical Education and the Medical Council of Iran, CME programs are routinely running in all IRIMC branches across the country. Recently IRIMC promotes the development of medical tourism through projects planned by Health Tourism Strategic Council comprising representatives of the Medical Council of Iran, Ministry of Foreign Affairs, Ministry of Health and Medical Education and the Ministry of Cultural Heritage, Handicrafts and Tourism.
