= University of Social Welfare and Rehabilitation Sciences =

- دانشگاه علوم توانبخشی و سلامت اجتماعی
- Type: Public
- Established: 1992
- Chancellor: Prof. Seyed Ali Hosseini
- Academic staff: 175
- Students: 1,700
- Location: Tehran, Iran; 35°48′03″N 51°24′00″E
- Campus: Urban
- Website: en.uswr.ac.ir

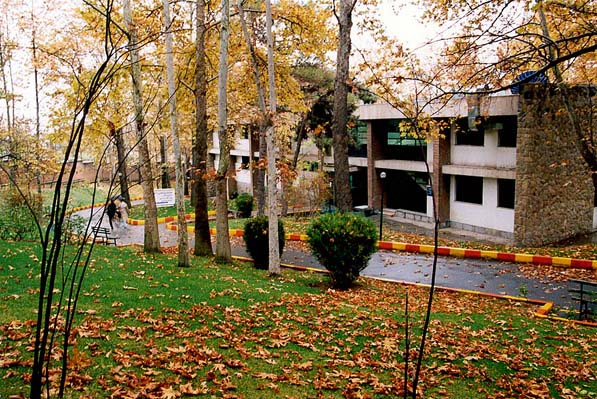
USWR Campus

The University of Social Welfare and Rehabilitation Sciences (USWR; Persian: دانشگاه علوم توانبخشی و سلامت اجتماعی, romanized: Daneshgah-e olum-e tavanbakhshi va salamat-e ejtemaei) is a public university in Tehran, Iran. The university has three faculties including rehabilitation sciences, behavioural sciences, and educational sciences and social welfare. It is a specialized university in the fields of rehabilitation, welfare, social health, and mental health.

== University Introduction ==
The University of Social Welfare and Rehabilitation Sciences (USWR; Persian: دانشگاه علوم توانبخشی و سلامت اجتماعی) is a public university in Tehran, Iran, affiliated with Iran's Ministry of Health and Medical Education. Established in 1992, the university focuses on rehabilitation sciences, social health and mental health.

The university has three faculties, 23 academic departments, nine research centers, more than 200 faculty members and about 2,000 students. It also provides clinical and educational services through affiliated facilities, including Rofeideh Rehabilitation Hospital, Razi Psychiatric Hospital, and Ibn Sina Complex Rehabilitation Center.

USWR began its activities with the establishment of the Department of Social Work and later expanded its academic, research and clinical activities in fields related to rehabilitation, social health and mental health.

== History ==
Origins

The University of Social Welfare and Rehabilitation Sciences was established on 9 Aban 1371 SH, corresponding to November 1, 1992, based on the approval of the Council for the Expansion of Medical Sciences Universities of Iran's Ministry of Health and Medical Education. According to the university, it was established to respond to national needs in rehabilitation, social health and mental health, and to train specialist human resources in these areas. Its academic activity began with the establishment of the Department of Social Work.

Milestones

The university was formerly known in Persian as دانشگاه علوم بهزیستی و توانبخشی. In 1399 SH, following the 280th session of the Council for the Expansion of Medical Sciences Universities, held on 13 Bahman 1399, and with the approval of the then Minister of Health, Saeed Namaki, its Persian name was changed to دانشگاه علوم توانبخشی و سلامت اجتماعی.

Development

After its initial activity in social work education, the university expanded through the development of additional academic departments, research centers and clinical-service facilities. Its current academic organization includes the Faculty of Rehabilitation Sciences, the Faculty of Behavioral Sciences and Mental Health, and the Faculty of Social Health.

Recent strategic direction

In recent years, the university has positioned its activities around three main fields: rehabilitation sciences, social health and mental health. Its current work includes education, applied research, clinical and community-oriented services, interdisciplinary collaboration and policy-relevant activity in fields related to rehabilitation, social welfare, mental health, ageing, addiction studies and health in emergencies and disasters.

== Educational, Welfare, and Campus Facilities ==
Location

The main campus of the University of Social Welfare and Rehabilitation Sciences is located in northern Tehran, in the Evin/Velenjak area, on Daneshjoo Boulevard, Koodakyar Dead End. The university is also affiliated with clinical and educational facilities, including Rofeideh Rehabilitation Hospital, Razi Psychiatric Hospital, and Ibn Sina Complex Rehabilitation Center.

Main buildings and facilities

The university's main campus includes administrative, academic, research, educational and student-service buildings, including the Presidency Building, Farabi Building, Ibn Sina Building, Ghadir Building, Shahid Ahmadi Roshan Amphitheatre and the Central Library.

The Presidency Building houses university administrative offices. The Farabi Building is used for academic, research and event-related activities, including meetings, workshops and seminars. The Ibn Sina Building is used for student and educational administration, while the Ghadir Building houses the Student Counselling Center. The Shahid Ahmadi Roshan Amphitheatre is used for conferences and university events.

The Central Library is part of the university's learning and research infrastructure. University library materials state that the Central Library was established in 1371 SH, occupies about 500 square metres, and holds printed and electronic Persian and non-Persian books, dissertations and research reports.

Educational and research facilities

The university's educational and research facilities support teaching, clinical training, research and continuing academic activities. These include educational administration offices, the Education Development Center, academic departments, research centers, laboratories, clinical training sites, the Central Library and digital-library services.

Student welfare and services

Student welfare services are coordinated mainly through the Office of Student and Cultural Affairs. These services include dormitory administration, student welfare support, nutrition services, transportation, counselling and mental-health services, cultural activities and student sports.

The university provides dormitory accommodation as part of its student welfare services. University student materials list five student dormitories, alongside welfare services such as student loans, insurance-related support, student employment, nutrition services, transportation and counselling.

Sports and recreational facilities

The university's physical education office is responsible for physical education courses, student sports competitions, training sessions, sports camps and participation in national medical-sciences student sports events. Student sports activities include futsal, football, volleyball, badminton, chess, table tennis, athletics, darts and physical fitness.

== Organization and administration ==
The University of Social Welfare and Rehabilitation Sciences is a public university affiliated with Iran's Ministry of Health and Medical Education. Its administrative structure is headed by the university president and includes vice-presidential offices, academic faculties, research units, administrative departments, councils and committees.

The president is the chief executive officer of the university and is responsible for the overall management of academic, research, clinical and administrative affairs. The university's senior management is supported by vice-presidential offices in areas such as education, research and technology, student and cultural affairs, treatment and rehabilitation, management and resources, and international affairs.

The university also has a board of trustees. The board's secretariat is responsible for coordinating matters related to the board of trustees, reviewing administrative and financial regulations, documenting and classifying related information, and communicating with the central board-of-trustees secretariat of the Ministry of Health and Medical Education.

Academically, the university is organized into three main faculties:

1. The Faculty of Rehabilitation Sciences
2. The Faculty of Behavioral Sciences Mental Health
3. Faculty of Social Health

The Faculty of Rehabilitation Sciences includes ten departments:

- Audiology
- Basic sciences
- Clinical sciences
- Ergonomics
- Genetics
- Occupational therapy
- Orthotics and Prosthetics
- Physiotherapy
- Rehabilitation management
- and Speech therapy

The Faculty of Behavioral Sciences and Mental Health includes six departments:

- Nursing
- Preschool education
- Psychiatry
- Clinical psychology
- Psychology and education of exceptional children
- Counselling

The Faculty of Social Health includes seven departments:

- Biostatistics and Epidemiology
- Social welfare management
- Ageing
- Social work
- Islamic studies
- Health in emergencies and disasters
- Health, Safety and environment management.

The university's decision-making and advisory structure includes several academic and administrative councils. These include the University Council, Cultural Council, Educational Council, Research Council, Student Council, Graduate Studies Council, Technology Council, Publishing Council and Medical Ethics Council.

== Education ==
Academic programs

The University of Social Welfare and Rehabilitation Sciences offers academic programs in rehabilitation sciences, mental health, social health, social welfare, ageing, genetics, nursing, counselling, disaster health and related fields. Its programs include undergraduate, master's, doctoral, professional doctorate, residency and Master of Public Health courses.

The university offers postgraduate programs in fields such as biostatistics and epidemiology, orthotics and prosthetics, ergonomics, nursing, psychology, human genetics, gerontology, health in emergencies and disasters, audiology, physiotherapy, speech therapy, social work, rehabilitation management, social welfare and health, health, safety and environment management, rehabilitation counselling and occupational therapy.

Student admission

Student admission is administered through the university's Office of Education and Graduate Studies. Admission procedures and eligibility requirements are published through the university's official education and graduate-studies portal.

Faculties and academic departments

The university is organized into three main faculties: the Faculty of Rehabilitation Sciences, the Faculty of Behavioral Sciences and Mental Health, and the Faculty of Social Health. The university's 23 academic departments are distributed across these three faculties: 10 in the Faculty of Rehabilitation Sciences, 6 in the Faculty of Behavioral Sciences and Mental Health, and 7 in the Faculty of Social Health.

Libraries and learning resources

The university provides learning and scientific information services through its central and digital library systems. The Central Library and digital library provide access to library services, electronic information resources, bibliographic tools, scientific journals and university publications.

== Research Institutes and Centers ==
The research institutes and centers of the University of Social Welfare and Rehabilitation Sciences constitute one of the principal pillars of the university's scientific development and evidence-based research activities within its specialized fields. They play an important role in advancing interdisciplinary knowledge, conducting applied research, and responding to the health needs of society. The university comprises one research institute and several active research centers in various areas of rehabilitation, mental health, and social health.

=== Social Health Research Institute ===
The Social Health Research Institute is one of the university's strategic research bodies. It conducts interdisciplinary research in the fields of social health, social problems, social policy, and the improvement of population health indicators. Drawing on the university's academic resources and collaborating with executive and research institutions, the institute contributes to the production of scientific evidence and the development of practical solutions for improving social health.

=== Research Centers ===
- Social Welfare Management Research Center official website
- Social Determinants of Health Research Center official website
- Substance Abuse and Dependence Research Center official website
- Health in Emergency and Disaster Research Center official website

=== Other Research Centers ===
- Pediatric Neurorehabilitation Research Center official website
- Genetics Research Center official website
- Aging Research Center official website
- Psychosis Research Center official website
- Neuromusculoskeletal Rehabilitation Research Center official website

== Ranking and Reputation ==
The University of Social Welfare and Rehabilitation Sciences was ranked in the 1201–1500 band in the Times Higher Education World University Rankings 2026. In the Times Higher Education World University Rankings by Subject 2026, it was ranked 801–1000 in Medical and Health and 601+ in Psychology.

== Student life ==
Student life at the University of Social Welfare and Rehabilitation Sciences is organized mainly through the Office of Student and Cultural Affairs. Student activities include scientific associations, cultural centers, student organizations, student sports, welfare services and cultural events.

=== Student organizations and cultural activities ===
The university has a range of student cultural centers and organizations that support artistic, cultural, social and voluntary activities. Cultural centers reported in university sources include groups related to the environment, Quran and Ahl al-Bayt, theatre and visual arts, content production and Mahdism. These groups organize cultural programs, festivals, meetings, artistic activities and student events.

Basij-e Daneshjooei, or Student Basij, is also active at the university and has organized cultural, social, voluntary and academic activities, including student service-oriented camps.

=== Student scientific associations ===
Student scientific associations operate in several academic fields and support scientific, research and skills-based student activities. The associations listed in university student materials include speech therapy, occupational therapy, physiotherapy, social work, psychology, orthotics and prosthetics, preschool child development and education, social welfare and health, health in emergencies and disasters, and rehabilitation counselling.

These associations organize workshops, specialist meetings, student seminars, scientific competitions and skills-based programs related to students’ academic and professional fields.

=== Student sports ===
The university offers student participation in several sports activities, including futsal, football, volleyball, badminton, chess, table tennis, athletics, darts and physical fitness. Sports services are coordinated through the university's physical education office, which organizes physical education courses, intra-university competitions, dormitory competitions, sports training sessions and student team activities.

University materials identify sports facilities and arrangements including a football field, a multipurpose sports hall, and agreements with municipal swimming pools and some private sports clubs for student use.

=== Traditions and student events ===
The available official sources do not identify a specific long-standing student tradition unique to the university. Student cultural life nevertheless includes recurring programs such as student cultural competitions, urban and out-of-city camps, artistic activities, environmental programs, group games, social-health activities, visits related to cultural and historical heritage, and religious occasions. These programs are intended to support student participation, social interaction and cultural awareness.
