= Quad helix =

Orthodontic appliance for widening the upper teeth

- Other names: Quadhelix
- Specialty: Orthodontics
- MeSH: D009968

A quad helix (or quadhelix) is an orthodontic appliance for the upper teeth that is cemented in the mouth. It is attached to the molars by 2 bands and has two or four active helix springs that widen the arch of the mouth to make room for crowded teeth, or correct a posterior cross-bite, where lower teeth are buccal (outer) than upper teeth. It is usually made from 38 mil stainless steel wire and is primarily indicated in mixed dentition, cleft patients and those that have performed the act of thumbsucking. A variety of this appliance is inserted into attachments that are welded to the bands. In this way the orthodontist can adjust the appliance without removing the bands.

The precursor to the quad-helix was the coffin spring. Similar devices known as tri-helices and bi-helices were later developed, with three and two helix springs, respectively.

The expander works by gently pushing the teeth outwards to eventually widen the upper arch. A quad helix expander is usually given to those who have a narrow top jaw, a cross bite and/or crowded teeth.
