= Iran University of Medical Sciences =

University in Tehran, Iran

Coordinates: 35°44′52″N 51°22′47″E

Iran University of Medical Sciences (IUMS)
- Former name: Imperial Medical Center
- Type: Public
- Established: 1974; 52 years ago
- President: Dr. Nader Tavakoli
- Faculty: 1260
- Students: 9000
- Location: Tehran, Iran
- Campus: Urban
- Website: en.iums.ac.ir

Iran University of Medical Sciences (IUMS) (Persian: دانشگاه علوم پزشکی و خدمات بهداشتی درمانی ایران, romanized: Dāneshgāh-e olum-e Pezeshki vâ Xadāmat-e Behdāshti-ye Darmāni-ye Iran) is a high ranked medical university in Iran. Located in Tehran, it was founded in 1974 under the name The Imperial Medical Center. The school was state operated, and its current reincarnation trains 9,000 students in the medical field.

The University operates 11 schools (Medicine, Nursing & Midwifery, Public Health, Health Management and Information Sciences, Mental Health & Behavioral Sciences, Rehabilitation Sciences, Advanced technologies in Medicine, Allied Medical Sciences and Medicine, dentistry and Pharmacy in its International Campus), two centers, two institutes, twenty-nine research centers, seventeen teaching and fifteen non-teaching hospitals in Tehran.

== Central Library ==
University rankings
- Iran University of Medical Sciences

Global – Overall
- CWTS World: 901 (2020)
- THE World: 501–600 (2021)
- USNWR Global: 987 (2021)

The Central Library and Documentation Center was established simultaneously with the medical center in 1974. It is the largest academic medical library in Iran and home to a wide range of resources and facilities to support research and teaching.

In 2012, this library was relocated to a new building. The new library building, spanning 9,250 square meters across 11 floors, is situated on the Hemmat Campus.

It has a staff of over 30 employees including medical librarianship and information sciences https://en-diglib.iums.ac.ir/Staff and provides information services for 12 hours a day.

The 7th National Conference of Librarians and Information Specialists in the Health Sector was held at the university’s Razi Conference Center, in collaboration with the Ministry of Health and Medical Education and Iran University of Medical Sciences. https://en-diglib.iums.ac.ir/News-&-Announcements/The-7th-National-Conference-of-Health-Librarians-and-Information-Specialists-was-held-at-the-Razi-Conference-Center-of-IUMS

The library operates under the supervision of the university’s Vice-Chancellery for Research and Technology.

=== The Central Library Heads and Directors ===
Dr. Seyyed Jamal-eddin Tabibi: 1983–1988

Dr. Alireza Hoveida: 1988–1989

Ms. Mina Seif (Acting Director for 1 month)

Dr. Mehrangiz Hariri: 1989–2000

Ms. Sousan Ertejaei: 2000–2005

Ms. Giti Hashemi: 2005–2006

Dr. Seyed Behnamdin Jameiei: 2007–2014

Dr. Leila Nemati Anaraki: 2014–2019

Dr. Leila Janani: 2019–2020

Dr. Azar Eslami (Acting Director for 4 months)

Dr. Seyed Behnamdin Jameie: 2021 – 2022

Dr. Shahram Sedghi Ilkhanlar: 2022 – 2023

Dr. Sirus Panahi: 2023–2025

Dr. Maryam Sadat Razmgir: 2025-

== Hospitals and educational centers ==
- Hazrat-e Rasool General Hospital
- Hazrat-e Fatemeh Plastic and Reconstructive Surgery Hospital
- Hazrat-e Ali Asghar Pediatrics Hospital

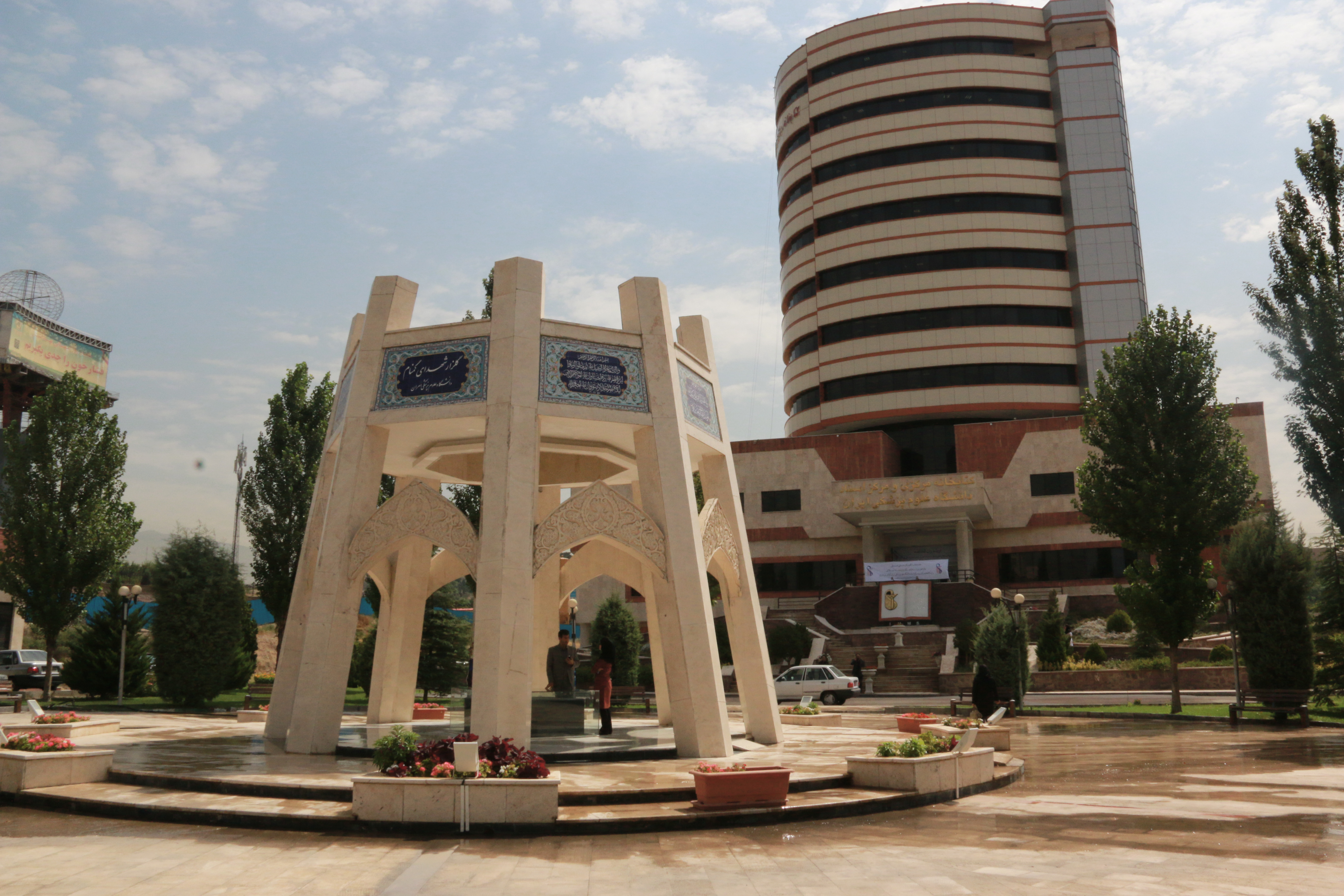
Central Library

- Shafa Yahyaeian Orthopedics Hospital
- Shahid Akbar-Abadi Gynecology & Obstetrics Hospital
- Shahid Motahari Burns Hospital
- Shahid Hashemi Nejad Urology Hospital
- Iran Psychiatric Hospital
- Firoozgar General Hospital
- Field Hospital
- Shohadaye Haft-e Tir Hospital
- Firoozabadi Hospital
- Lowlagar Hospital
- Shohadaye Yaft Abad Hospital
- Shahid Fahmideh Pediatrics Hospital
- Emam Sajad Hospital (Shahriyar)
- Hazrat-e Fatemeh Hospital (Robat Karim)

== Research Centers ==
Iran University of Medical Sciences has different research centers in different fields.

== Notable Alumni ==
Hamidreza Khankeh, Iranian scientist in the field of Emergency and Disaster Health, former chancellor of the University of Social Welfare and Rehabilitation Sciences and member of Academy of Medical Science Iran since 2016.

== Notable Researchers ==
Maziar Moradi-Lakeh, Medical doctor with advanced training in health metrics and evaluation, specializing in Real World Evidence (RWE).

== See also ==
- List of Islamic educational institutions
- Higher Education in Iran
- List of universities in Iran
- List of hospitals in Iran
- Iran University of Medical Sciences library management system
