= Prevalence of circumcision =

Overview of international circumcision rates

Map of circumcision prevalence, based on a 2007 WHO report Widespread, near-universal: >80% prevalence Widespread, common: 20–80% prevalence Uncommon: <20% prevalence N/A

The prevalence of circumcision is the percentage of males in a given population who have been circumcised, with the procedure most commonly being performed as a part of preventive healthcare, a religious obligation, or a cultural practice. Global prevalence is estimated to be close to 38%

Since 2012 both the World Health Organization and Joint United Nations Programme on HIV/AIDS have been promoting a higher rate of circumcision prevalence as a prevention against HIV transmission and some STIs in areas with high HIV transmission and low circumcision rates. Around 50% of all circumcisions worldwide are performed for reasons of preventive healthcare, while the other 50% are performed for other reasons, including religious and cultural.

In 2016, the global prevalence of circumcision was rising, predominantly due to the HIV/AIDS programs in Africa and a higher fertility rate among countries where the procedure is commonly performed.

== Overview ==
=== Present ===
Today the circumcision is practiced mostly by Jews, Samaritans, Druze, Coptic Christians, Ethiopian Orthodox, Eritrean Orthodox, Muslims, and some tribes in East and Southern Africa. Other countries with significant rates of circumcision include the United States, South Korea, and the Philippines.

Rates vary widely, from 99.9% in Morocco, and similarly high rates in many Muslim-majority countries, to 91.7% in Israel, 80% in the United States, to 75% in South Korea, to 45% in South Africa, to 20.7% in the United Kingdom, 14% in China, 13.5% in India, 9% in Japan, and 1% in Honduras. In Europe, most men are not circumcised, but circumcision is prevalent among Muslims who live in Europe, which includes both indigenous Muslims (in Turkey, Azerbaijan, and regions with significant Muslim population in the Balkans) as well as Muslims in immigrant communities in Western Europe. Circumcision is rare in South America. Philippines has a 91.7% circumcision prevalence, with such a high prevalence outside the Muslim world and Israel being found only among some countries in Africa and some island countries in Oceania.

It is estimated that a prevalence of circumcision of 90% or more is found in men in Afghanistan, Algeria, American Samoa, Azerbaijan, Bangladesh, Benin, Cameroon, Comoros, Democratic Republic of Congo, Cook Islands, Cote d'Ivoire, Djibouti, Egypt, Eritrea, Ethiopia, Gabon, Gambia, Gaza Strip, Ghana, Guam, Guinea-Bissau, Indonesia, Iran, Iraq, Israel, Jordan, Kenya, Kosovo, Kyrgyzstan, Liberia, Libya, Madagascar, Maldives, Mauritania, Morocco, Nauru, Niger, Nigeria, Niue, Northern Mariana Islands, Pakistan, Palau, Philippines, Samoa, Saudi Arabia, Senegal, Sierra Leone, Solomon Islands, Somalia, Syria, Tajikistan, Togo, Tokelau, Tonga, Tunisia, Turkey, Turkmenistan, Tuvalu, Uzbekistan, Vanuatu, West Bank, Western Sahara, Yemen.

In 2016, the global prevalence of circumcision was estimated to be around 38%, with notable increases of circumcision prevalence seen in the United States, the Middle East, and Africa; major medical organizations have promoted a higher rate of circumcision in Africa as a preventive against the spread of HIV/AIDS. In 2020, the World Health Organization reiterated that it is an efficacious prophylactic intervention if carried out by medical professionals under safe conditions in areas of high HIV/AIDS prevalence.

In 2014, the prevalence of circumcision in the United States was estimated to be around 80%. Wolters Kluwer estimated that close to 80% of United States' males in 2025 were circumcised. Large portions of Africa have adopted the practice as a preventive measure against the spread of HIV. It has overwhelming prevalence in the Muslim world and in Israel due to the religious beliefs of most Muslims and Jews; however, some non-Muslim groups living within Muslim-majority countries, such as Armenians and Assyrians, do not practice it. It is prevalent in some Muslim-majority countries in southeast Asia such as Indonesia and Malaysia; however, the WHO states that there is "little non-religious circumcision in Asia, with the exceptions of the Republic of Korea and the Philippines". In parts of Africa it is often practiced as part of tribal customs from Christians, Muslims and Animists. In contrast, rates are much lower in most of Europe, parts of southern Africa, most of Asia, Oceania and Latin America, constituting South America, Central America, the Caribbean and Mexico. Australia, Canada, New Zealand and the United Kingdom are examples of countries that have seen a decline in male circumcision in recent decades, while there have been indications of increasing demand in southern Africa, partly for preventive reasons due to the HIV epidemic there.

== Africa ==
Studies suggest that about 62% of African males are circumcised. However, the rate varies widely between different regions, and among ethnic and religious groups, with Muslim North Africans practising it for religious reasons, central Africans as part of ethnic rituals or local custom, and some traditionally non-circumcising populations in the South recently adopting the practice due to measures by the World Health Organization to prevent AIDS. Williams, B.G. et al. commented that: "Most of the currently available data on the prevalence of [male circumcision] are several decades old, while several of the recent studies were carried out as adjuncts to demographic and health surveys and were not designed to determine the prevalence of male circumcision."

Prevalence of circumcision in Africa
Country	WHO (2006)	Williams et al (2006)	Morris et al (2016)
Angola	>80	66	57.5
Central African Republic	20–80	67	63
Chad	>80	64	73.5
Republic of the Congo	>80	70	70
Democratic Republic of the Congo	>80	70	97.2
Gabon	>80	93	99.2
Burundi	<20	2	61.7
Djibouti	>80	94	96.5
Eritrea	>80	95	97.2
Ethiopia	>80	76	92.2
Kenya	>80	84	91.2
Rwanda	<20	10	13.3
Somalia	>80	93	93.5
Sudan	20–80	47	39.4
Tanzania	20–80	70	72
Uganda	20–80	25	26.7
Botswana	<20	25	15.1
Lesotho	20–80	0	52
Malawi	<20	17	21.6
Mozambique	20–80	56	47.4
Namibia	<20	15	25.5
South Africa	20–80	35	44.7
Eswatini	<20	50	8.2
Zambia	<20	12	21.6
Zimbabwe	<20	10	9.2
Benin	>80	84	92.9
Burkina Faso	>80	89	88.3
Cameroon	>80	93	94
Equatorial Guinea	>80	86	87
Gambia	>80	90	94.5
Ghana	>80	95	91.6
Guinea	>80	83	84.2
Guinea-Bissau	>80	91	93.3
Côte d'Ivoire	20–80	93	96.7
Liberia	>80	70	97.7
Mali	>80	95	86
Mauritania	>80	78	99.2
Niger	>80	92	95.5
Nigeria	>80	81	98.9
Senegal	>80	89	93.5
Sierra Leone	>80	90	96.1
Togo	>80	93	95.2

=== Less than 20% ===
Botswana, Rwanda, Eswatini, Zimbabwe.

=== Between 20% and 80% ===
Angola, Burundi, Central African Republic, Chad, Congo (Rep), Lesotho, Malawi, Mozambique, Namibia, South Africa, Sudan, Tanzania, Uganda, Zambia.

==== Traditional practices ====
In Sotho and Xhosa culture, circumcision is a traditional initiation rite. It is known as lebollo la banna in Sotho and ulwaluko in Xhosa.

Zulu King Shaka abolished the practise among the Zulu, though in 2010 Goodwill Zwelithini controversially proposed to revive it as a way of preventing HIV/AIDS.

==== Modern practices ====
It is estimated that 44.7% of males are circumcised in South Africa. One national study reported that 54.2% of Black South Africans were circumcised, with 32.1% of those traditionally circumcised and 13.4% circumcised for medical reasons.

Circumcision is now uncommon in South Africa except for cultural or religious reasons, and it is not performed in most public or children's hospitals for non-medical reasons. Less than 25% of non-Black South Africans are circumcised.

==== Statistics ====
Circumcision in South Africa (2014)
Demographic	Rate
Race
Black	48.2%
Coloured	24.0%
Indian/Asian	32.6%
White	25.5%
Ethnicity
Ndebele	54.3%
Northern Sotho	75.7%
Southern Sotho	36.4%
Swati	24.5%
Tsonga	67.6%
Tswana	30.0%
Venda	82.7%
Xhosa	74.2%
Zulu	18.4%
Province
Eastern Cape	68.4%
Free State	34.5%
Gauteng	43.4%
KwaZulu-Natal	20.7%
Limpopo	74.9%
Mpumalanga	37.6%
Northern Cape	19.3%
North West	30.5%
Western Cape	38.9%
Total	42.8%

=== More than 80% ===
Benin, Burkina Faso, Cameroon, Congo (Dem Rep), Côte d'Ivoire, Djibouti, Equatorial Guinea, Eritrea, Ethiopia, Gabon, Gambia, Ghana, Guinea, Guinea-Bissau, Kenya, Liberia, Mali, Mauritania, Niger, Nigeria, Senegal, Sierra Leone, Somalia, Togo.

== Americas ==
=== Less than 20% ===
Less than 20% of the population are circumcised in Argentina, Belize, Bolivia, Brazil, Chile, Colombia, Costa Rica, Cuba, Dominican Republic, El Salvador, Ecuador, French Guiana, Guatemala, Guyana, Haiti, Honduras, Jamaica, Nicaragua, Panama, Paraguay, Peru, Suriname, Saint Lucia, The Bahamas, Trinidad and Tobago, Uruguay, Venezuela.

==== The Bahamas ====
The reported circumcision rate for younger individuals (age 15–18) is 16.7% (2019).

==== Argentina ====
The circumcision rate among homosexual men in Buenos Aires is reported to be 13% (2013).

==== Brazil ====
The overall prevalence of circumcision is reported to be 6.9%. The reported rate is 13% in Rio de Janeiro, indicating possible differences between urban and rural rates.

==== Colombia ====
The overall prevalence of circumcision is reported to be 6.9%.

=== Between 20% and 80% ===
==== Mexico ====
In 2006 the prevalence of circumcision in Mexico was estimated to be 10% to 31%. A recent (2020) HIV study conducted in Mexico City found a participant circumcision rate of 23% (255/1118).

==== Puerto Rico ====
In 2012 a random sample of male visitors to a STI center in San Juan were surveyed on various topics, the reported circumcision rate was 32.4%.

==== Canada ====
Rate of neonatal circumcision by province according to the Maternity Experiences Survey in 2006–2007

Circumcision in Canada followed the pattern of other English speaking countries, with the practice being adopted during the 1900s on hygienic grounds, but with the rate of circumcision declining in the latter part of the 20th century, particularly after a new policy position was released in 1975. The Canadian Paediatric Society estimated that, in 1970, 48 percent of males were circumcised. However, studies conducted in 1977–1978 revealed a wide variation in the incidence of circumcision between different provinces and territories. For example, Yukon reported a rate of 74.8 percent, while Newfoundland reported an incidence of 1.9 to 2.4 percent. The rate continued to drop, with the newborn circumcision rate in Ontario in 1994–95 dropping to 29.9%.

A survey of Canadian maternity practices conducted in 2006/2007, and published in 2009 by the national public health agency, found a newborn circumcision rate of 31.9%. Rates varied markedly across the country, from close to zero in Newfoundland and Labrador and 6.8% in Nova Scotia to 44.3% in Alberta and 43.7% in Ontario. In 2015, the Canadian Paediatric Society used those statistics in determining the national circumcision rate it currently quotes.

A more recent survey conducted in 2011 on expecting couples in Saskatchewan (average age 30.3) found the prevalence of circumcision among expecting fathers to be 61% and that 56.4% of parents would consider elective circumcision for their son.

Routine newborn circumcision for non-medical reasons was progressively de-insured by provinces between the 1980s and 2000s; British Columbia was the first to de-insure in 1984, New Brunswick in 1994, Saskatchewan in 1996, Nova Scotia in 1997, and Manitoba in 2005.

Table: Percentage of mothers reporting having their baby circumcised, by region (2006/07)
Province/Territory	%	Province/Territory	%
Alberta	44.3	New Brunswick	18.0
Ontario	43.7	Quebec	12.3
Prince Edward Island	39.2	Northwest Territories	9.7
Saskatchewan	35.6	Nova Scotia	6.8
Canada	31.9	Newfoundland and Labrador	*
Manitoba	31.6	Nunavut	*
British Columbia	30.2	Yukon	*
* Numerator too small for rate calculation

=== Over 80% ===
==== United States ====
During the 2000s, the prevalence of circumcision in men aged 14–59 differed by race: 91 percent of White men, 76 percent of Black men, and 44 percent of Hispanic men were circumcised, according to Mayo Clinic Proceedings. Morris et al. found a present rate of 77% in 2010, when accounting for underreporting and, as of 2014, an estimated 80.5% of American men aged 14–59 are circumcised. Wolters Kluwer estimated that close to 80% of United States' males in 2021 were circumcised. Medicaid funding for infant circumcision used to be available in every state, but starting with California in 1982, 13 states have eliminated Medicaid coverage of routine circumcision as of 2025, with several states reversing their decisions and reinstating coverage for the procedure. One study in the Midwest of the U.S. found that this had no effect on the newborn circumcision rate but it did affect the demand for circumcision at a later time. Another study, published in early 2009, found a difference in the neonatal male circumcision rate of 24% between states with and without Medicaid coverage. The study was controlled for other factors such as the percentage of Hispanic patients.

The CDC uses two data sources to track circumcision rates. The first is the National Health and Nutrition Examination Survey (NHANES), which records circumcisions performed at any time at any location. The second is the National Hospital Discharge Survey (NHDS), which does not record circumcisions performed outside the hospital setting or those performed at any age following discharge from the birth hospitalization. Methodologically flawed calculations throughout the 2000s and 2010s showed the rate decreasing off of these statistics, but this data is believed to be misleading due to discrepancies in hospital discharge data and miscoding, leading to underreporting.

Circumcision was the second-most common procedure performed on patients under one year of age, after prophylactic vaccinations and inoculations. There are various explanations for why the infant circumcision rate in the United States is different from comparable countries. Many parents' decisions about circumcision are preconceived, which may contribute to the high rate of elective circumcision. Brown & Brown (1987) reported the most correlated factor is whether the father is circumcised.

== Asia ==
=== Less than 20% ===
Bhutan, Myanmar, China, Cambodia, Hong Kong, India, Japan, Laos, Mongolia, Nepal, North Korea, Papua New Guinea, Singapore, Sri Lanka, Taiwan, Thailand, Vietnam.

==== India ====
According to the National Family Health Survey (NFHS-4) the overall circumcision rate in India is 16%.

==== China ====
The overall prevalence of circumcision in China is reported to be 14%.

==== Hong Kong ====
A sample of children aged <12 found a circumcision rate of 3.4% (1982). A survey on men who regularly visit female sex workers from 2012 found a circumcision rate of 28%.

==== Singapore ====
The prevalence of circumcision in Singapore is estimated to be 14.9%.

==== Taiwan ====
It is estimated that the circumcision rate for men aged 20–40 is between 10 and 15%.

==== Cambodia ====
The overall prevalence of circumcision in Cambodia is reported to be 3.5%.

=== Between 20% and 80% ===
Kazakhstan, Lebanon, Malaysia, and South Korea.

==== Lebanon ====
Unlike other countries in the Arab world, which consistently have male circumcision rates above 85%, Lebanon's circumcision rate varies depending on the study. According to a 2016 study, 59.7% of Lebanese males are estimated to be circumcised. However, due to a lack of survey data, this study may have based its estimate on the assumption that nearly all non-Muslim and non-Jewish males were not circumcised, leading to an underestimate of the rate. Lebanon also has a higher percentage of Christians than any other Arab country, most of whom are Maronite Catholics. When compared to the Muslim and Druze populations, circumcision may be less common in this group, which could explain a lower national rate.

==== South Korea ====
Circumcision is largely a modern-day phenomenon in South Korea, though the rate has decreased in recent years. While during the twentieth century, the rate of circumcision increased to around 80%, virtually no circumcision was performed prior to 1945, as it was against Korea's long and strong tradition of preserving the body as a gift from parents. A 2001 study of 20-year-old South Korean men found that 78% were circumcised. At the time, the authors commented that "South Korea has possibly the largest absolute number of teenage or adult circumcisions anywhere in the world. Because circumcision started through contact with the American military during the Korean War, South Korea has an unusual history of circumcision." According to a 2002 study, 86.3% of South Korean males aged 14–29 were circumcised. In 2012, it is the case of 75.8% of the same age group. Only after 1999 has some information against circumcision become available (at the time of the 2012 study, only 3% of Korean internet sites, using the most popular Korean search engine Naver, were against indiscriminate circumcision and 97% were for). The authors of the study speculate "that the very existence of information about the history of Korean circumcision, its contrary nature relative to a longstanding tradition, its introduction by the US military, etc., has been extremely influential on the decision-making process regarding circumcision.".

=== More than 80% ===
Afghanistan, Azerbaijan, Bangladesh, Bahrain, Brunei, Indonesia, Iran, Iraq, Israel, Pakistan, Jordan, Kuwait, Kyrgyzstan, Oman, Palestine, the Philippines, Qatar, Saudi Arabia, Syria, Tajikistan, Turkey, Turkmenistan, Uzbekistan, the United Arab Emirates and Yemen.

==== Philippines ====
The overall prevalence of circumcision (tuli) in the Philippines is reported to be 92.5%. Most circumcisions in the Philippines are performed between the ages of 11 and 13.

== Europe ==
Prevalence of circumcision in Europe (2025) <10% 10–20% 20–30% 30–40% 40–50% >90% No data

=== Less than 20% ===
Armenia, Austria, Belarus, Bulgaria, Croatia, Czech Republic, Cyprus, Denmark, Estonia, Finland, France, Georgia, Germany, Greece, Hungary, Iceland, Ireland, Italy, Latvia, Lithuania, Malta, Moldova, The Netherlands, Norway, Poland, Portugal, Romania, Russia, Slovakia, Slovenia, Spain, Serbia, Sweden, Switzerland, Ukraine.

==== Germany (<15 %) ====
An exact number for the circumcision rate in Germany is not available. A 2016 study in Population Health Metrics quotes a survey stating 6.7% for men aged 30 to 61. Public health insurances in Germany paid for 32 thousand circumcisions on boys in 2020.

In this context, a peer-reviewed study found that circumcisions of minors increased slightly throughout the study period between 2013 and 2018. The corresponding population-related number rose from 7.5 circumcisions per 1,000 minors in 2013 to 8 in 2018. A peer-reviewed study in 2021 found that circumcisions were more frequent in the first 5 years of life and above 15 years of age, whereas preputium-preserving procedures were preferred in the age groups between 5 and 14 years of age. It also claims a decrease in the number of circumcisions in recent years, stating that "[t]he number of circumcisions and preputium-preserving operations decreased in absolute and relative numbers" and that "[t]he increasing trend towards neonatal circumcision observed in the United States is absent in Germany". Neonatal in this context refers to circumcisions shortly after birth.

Another peer-reviewed study in 2023 also reports that among than 38,000 German homosexual men without migration background 19.7% were circumcised.

==== The Netherlands (9 - 16%) ====
Among participants of the HELIUS study, recruited between 2011 and 2015 (age 18–70), the circumcision rate for Dutch men without a migration background was 9%. The rate was > 95% for men of Moroccan, Turkish or Ghanaian background. A small study from 2019 that recruited homosexual men suffering from various STDs found that 16% of the participants were circumcised.

==== France (14%) ====
In France, according to a telephone survey (TNS Sofres Institute, 2008), 14% of men are circumcised.

==== Bulgaria (13.4%) ====
The circumcision rate in Bulgaria is estimated to be 13.4%.

==== Russia (11.8%) ====
The circumcision rate in Russia is estimated to be 11.8%.

==== Sweden (11.8%) ====
A study on hypospadias in 2016 recruited a control group (i.e. men without hypospadias) via the Swedish Population Registry; the reported circumcision rate of the controls was 11.8% with a mean age of 33.

==== Denmark (1.6 - 7%) ====
In 1986, 511 out of approximately 478,000 Danish boys aged 0–14 years were circumcised. This corresponds to a cumulative national circumcision rate of around 1.6% by the age of 15 years.

A recent survey (2017–2018) called Project SEXUS surveyed 62,675 Danes aged 15–89 years on sexual topics. The survey found the male circumcision rate to be 7%. Of the respondents 5% were circumcised for medical or other reasons, while 2% were circumcised for religious or traditional reasons.

==== Spain (6.6%) ====
The overall prevalence of circumcision in Spain is reported to be 6.6%.

==== Poland (5%) ====
A 2017 survey of Polish university students (average age - 25) found a circumcision rate of 5%. This figure is an estimate and fully representative only for students of the university where the survey took place. A 2016 study estimated a prevalence rate of 0.11% in total population.

==== Slovenia (8.5%) ====
In Slovenia, a 1999–2001 national probability sample of the general population aged 18–49 years found that overall, 4.5% of Slovenian male citizens reported being circumcised. Prevalence strongly varied across religious groups, with 92.4% of Muslims being circumcised, 1.7% of Roman Catholics, 0% of other religious affiliations (Evangelic, Serbian Orthodox, other), and 7.1% of those with no religious affiliation.

The circumcision rate was reported to be 8.5% in 2016.

==== Finland (2-4%) ====
In Finland, the overall prevalence of circumcision is 2–4%, according to a recent publication by the Finnish Health Ministry.

==== Croatia (1.34%) ====
A 2016 report found that the circumcision rate in Croatia was 1.34%.

=== Between 20% and 80% ===
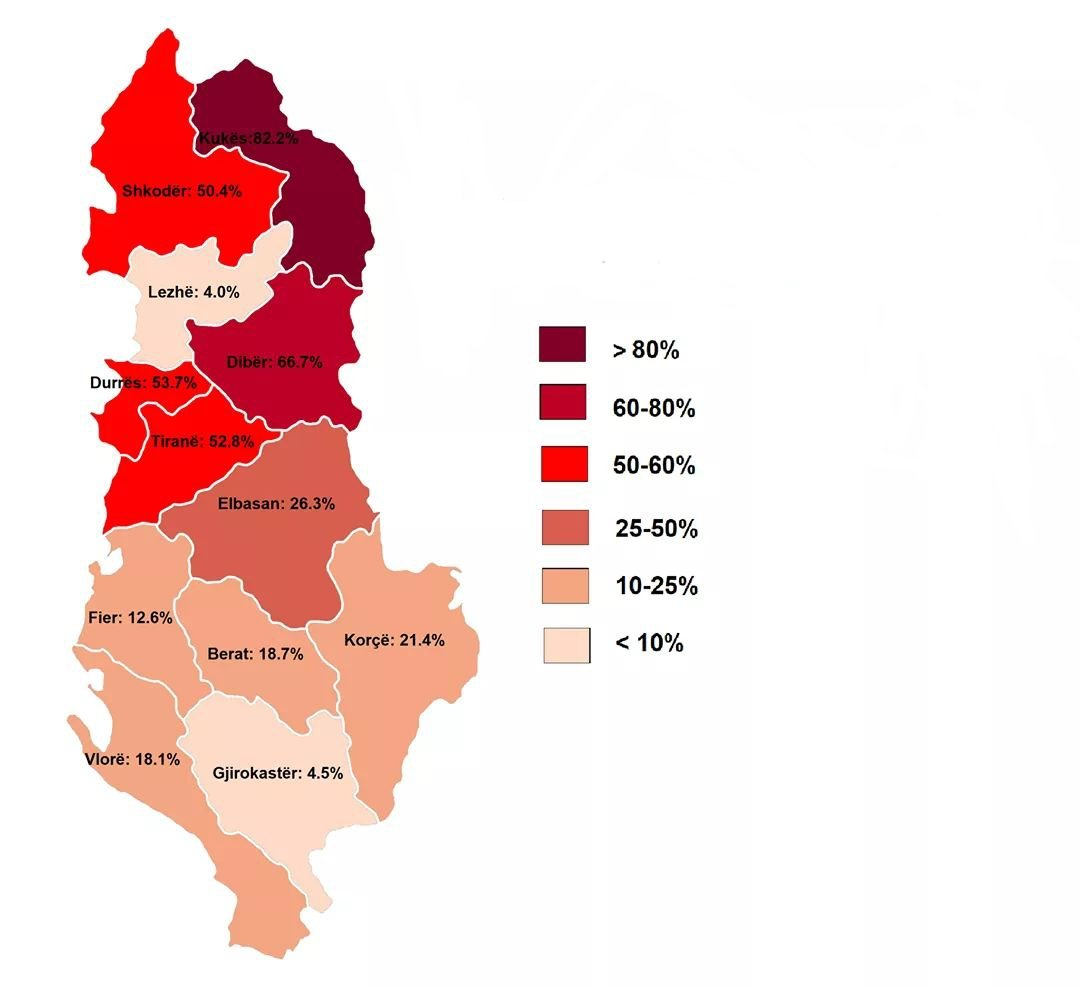
Circumcision rate by region in Albania for males aged 15–49, 2017–2018

Belgium, Albania, the United Kingdom, North Macedonia, and Bosnia and Herzegovina.

==== Bosnia and Herzegovina (58.7% or 41.6%) ====
In Bosnia and Herzegovina the circumcision rate was 58.7% in 2018. Another study shows a circumcision rate of 41.6% in Bosnia and Herzegovina.

==== Albania (36.8% or 47.7%) ====
In Albania during the years 2008–09 the percentage of men age 15–49 who reported having been circumcised was 47.7%. In the years 2017–18 the circumcision rate in Albania had declined to 36.8%. The percentage of circumcised men aged 15–49 across various prefectures ranges from 82.2% in Kukës, 66.7% in Dibër, 53.7% in Durrës, 52.8% in Tirana, and 50.4% in Shkodër, to 26.3% in Elbasan, 21.4% in Korçë, 18.7% in Berat, 18.1% in Vlorë, 12.6% in Fier, 4.5% in Gjirokastër, and 4.0% in Lezhë. Albania is unique regarding the lower than expected practice of circumcision as even among Muslims, the rate is 46.5%, while among Bektashis it is lower at 21%. This contrasts with the near-universal practice of circumcision as Islamic custom among Muslims worldwide.

==== United Kingdom (20.7%) ====
A 2015 survey of 6293 men (aged 16-74) in the United Kingdom found a prevalence of 20.7%. Racial and religious differences were apparent, as the study reported that circumcision in the United Kingdom ranged from 2.6% in Hindu British men, 16.3% in White British men, compared to 49.3% in Asian British men, 53.6% in Black British men, and 85.2% in Muslim British men. An older national survey on sexual attitudes in 2000 found that 15.8% of men or boys in the United Kingdom (ages 16–44) were circumcised, while 11.7% of 16- to 19-year-olds, and 19.6% of 40- to 44-year-olds said they had been circumcised. Apart from black Caribbeans, men born overseas were more likely to be circumcised. Rickwood et al. reported that the proportion of English boys circumcised for medical reasons had fallen from 35% in the early 1930s to 6.5% by the mid-1980s. As of 2000 an estimated 3.8% of male children in the UK would be circumcised for medical reasons by the age of 15. The researchers stated that this trend in the late 1990s saw too many boys, especially under the age of 5, were being circumcised because of a misdiagnosis of phimosis.

==== Belgium (~22%) ====
A study on genital sensitivity from 2013 recruited ~1400 adult men through leaflets randomly distributed at railway stations in Belgium. In this study 22.6% of the participants reported being circumcised. The majority identified as being Caucasian with only a very small minority reporting being Asian, Arabic or African. In another more recent (2023) and similarly designed study on genital sensitivity 21.7% (152 out of 702) of participants reported being circumcised.

According to data from the National Institute for Health and Disability Insurance (NIHDI or RIZIV), the number of circumcisions performed in Belgium amounted to 25,286 in the year of 2011. The vast majority of the procedures were performed on individuals aged < 16 years old. If this rate remains stable it is estimated that over time the circumcision rate for boys aged 16 will reach 31.71%.

=== Over 80% ===
Kosovo (91.7%), Azerbaijan (98.5%) and Turkey (98.6%).

== Oceania ==
In Australia and New Zealand, circumcision was once common but is now rare except among Muslims and Jews. Historically it was practiced by some Aboriginal Australians in parts of Australia as an initiation ritual.

In Papua New Guinea, circumcision is rare, but a significant minority of men undergo some form of penile cutting.

In many Pacific Island countries, including Fiji, Niue, Samoa, Tonga and parts of the Solomon Islands and Vanuatu, circumcision is a traditional rite of passage and is common. In Fiji, circumcision is only common among Indigenous and Muslim Fijians.

=== Australia ===
As of 2016, an estimated 58% of Australian men were circumcised. Circumcision is especially rare in Tasmania.

Circumcision reached its peak in Australia in the 1950s with a rate of more than 80%, but steadily fell to an estimated 15% in 2012.

The Australian Longitudinal Study of Health and Relationships is a computer assisted telephone interview of males aged 16–64 that uses a nationally representative population sample. In 2005 the interview found that the prevalence of circumcision in Australia was roughly 58%. Circumcision status was more common with males over 30 than males under 30, and more common with males who were born in Australia. 66% of males born in Australia were circumcised and less than 1/3 of males under 30 were circumcised. There has been a decline in the rate of infant circumcision in Australia. The Royal Australasian College of Physicians (RACP) estimated in 2010 that 10 to 20 percent of newborn boys were being circumcised, but the prevalence of male circumcision is much higher due to the presence of older circumcised males remaining in the population. Medicare Australia records show the number of males younger than six months that underwent circumcision dropped from 19,663 in 2007/08 to 6,309 (8%) in 2016/17 and further to 3,992 (2.48%) in 2023.

=== Fiji ===
In 2016, the circumcision rate in Fiji was 55%. While circumcision is common among iTaukei (Indigenous Fijians) and among Muslims, it is not common among European or Hindu Indo-Fijians.

Circumcision is an ancient rite in Fiji that predates colonialism. In precolonial Fiji, boys were circumcised around age 12. The practice of circumcision remains today, though now it is performed by a doctor.

=== New Zealand ===
According to the World Health Organization, fewer than 20% of males are circumcised in New Zealand in 2007. In New Zealand routine circumcision for which there is no medical indication is uncommon and no longer publicly funded within the public hospital system. In a study of men born in 1972–1973 in Dunedin, 40.2% were circumcised. In a study of men born in 1977 in Christchurch, 26.1% were circumcised. A 1991 survey conducted in Waikato found that 7% of male infants were circumcised.

=== Papua New Guinea ===
While 47% of men in Papua New Guinea have undergone some form of penile cutting (with 43% having not done so), only about 10% are actually circumcised. Many women in Papua New Guinea express concerns about male circumcision.

=== Solomon Islands ===
An estimated 95% of Solomon Islanders are circumcised as of 2016.

Superincision is well-documented on the island of Tikopia in the Solomon Islands, where it is a shame to not be superincised.

=== Vanuatu ===
An estimated 95% of Vanuatuans are circumcised as of 2016.

On the island of Tanna, circumcisions are traditionally performed in September.

== See also ==
- Prevalence of female genital mutilation
- Circumcision and law
