= NVN (disambiguation) =

NVN or North Vietnam was a country from 1945 to 1976.

NVN may also refer to:

== Businesses ==
- National Videotex Network, a defunct online service provider
- Nventa Biopharmaceuticals Corporation (TSX: NVN)

== Transport ==
- Nahverkehrs-Zweckverband Niederrhein, a subsidiary of Verkehrsverbund Rhein-Ruhr
- Nervino Airport (IATA: NVN), Beckwourth, California
- Newhaven Town railway station, a railway station in Sussex, England

== Other uses ==
- N. V. N. Somu (1937–1997), Indian politician
- Nundinae, in Latin inscriptions
