= Religion and circumcision =

Circumcision for religious purposes

Religious circumcision is generally performed shortly after birth, during childhood, or around puberty as part of a rite of passage. Circumcision for religious reasons is most frequently practiced in Judaism and Islam. In some African and Eastern Christian denominations male circumcision is an established practice, and require that their male members undergo circumcision.

== Abrahamic religions ==
=== Rastafari ===
Rastafari beliefs on circumcision are often rooted in the Old Testament ideas of one's body as a temple. Unnecessarily removing part of your body is seen as damaging and in conflict with living naturally.

=== Judaism ===
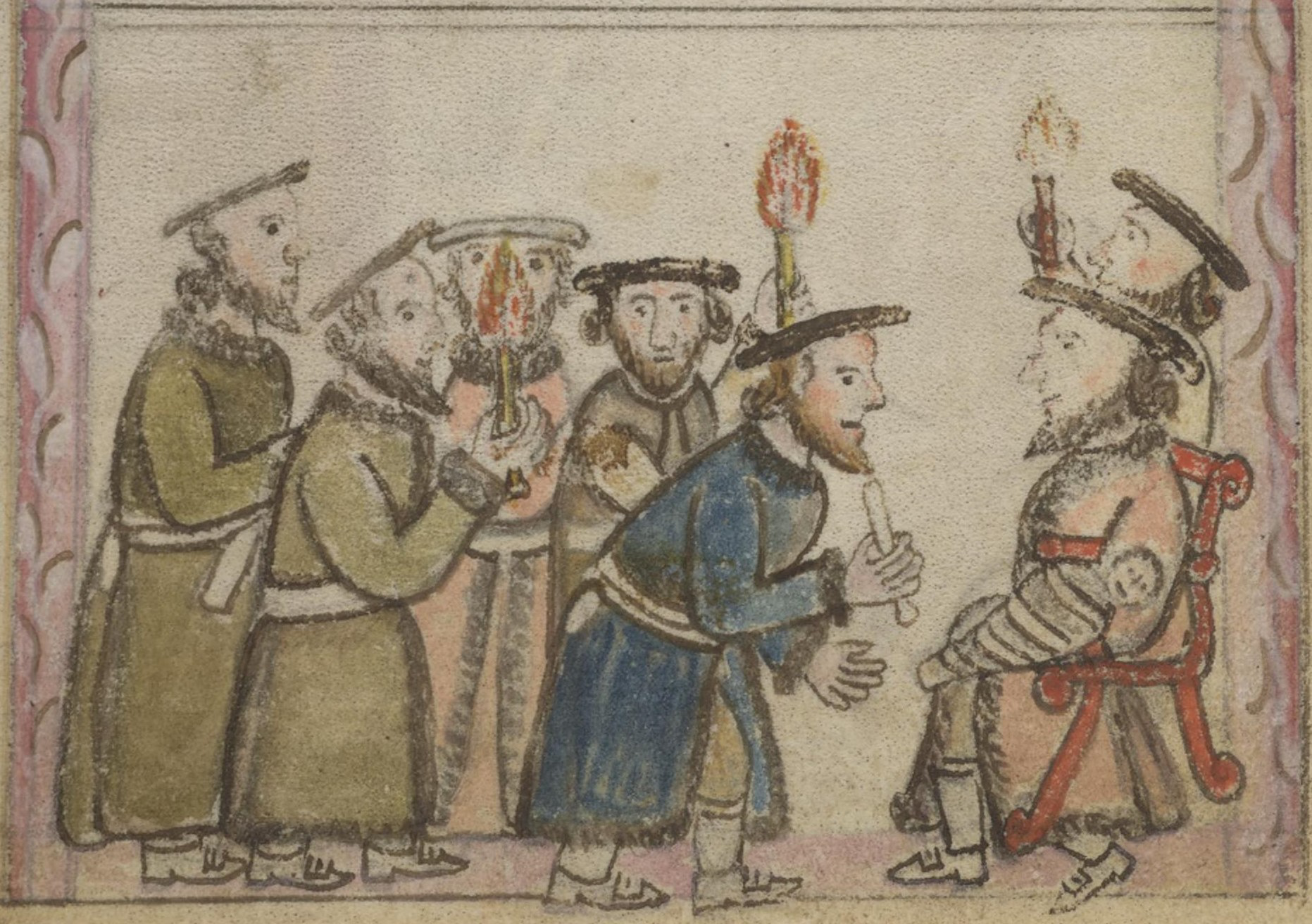
1824 illustration from Lipník nad Bečvou

The brit milah (Hebrew: בְּרִית מִילָה, Modern Israeli: [bʁit miˈla], Ashkenazi: [bris ˈmilə]; "covenant of circumcision"), or bris (Yiddish: ברית, romanized: bris), is the ceremony of circumcision in Judaism and Samaritanism during which a newborn male's foreskin is surgically removed. According to the Book of Genesis, God commanded the biblical patriarch Abraham to be circumcised: an act to be followed by his descendants on the eighth day of life symbolizing the covenant between God and the Jewish people. Today, it is generally performed by a mohel on the eighth day after the infant's birth and is followed by a celebratory meal known as a seudat mitzvah.

Brit milah is considered among the most important and central commandments in Judaism, and the rite has played a central role in Jewish history and Jewish culture. The Talmud, when discussing the importance of brit milah, considers it equal to all other mitzvot (commandments). Barring extraordinary circumstances, Abraham's descendants who voluntarily fail to undergo brit milah are believed to suffer Kareth, which is, in Jewish theology, the extinction of the soul and denial of a share in the World to Come. The brit is understood by Jews to signify acceptance into the ongoing covenant between God and the Jewish people, which is why gerim (converts to Judaism) undergo a form of brit to finalize conversion.

Historical conflicts between Jews and European civilizations have occurred several times over brit milah, including multiple campaigns of Jewish ethnic, cultural, and religious persecution, with subsequent bans and restrictions on the practice as an attempted means of forceful assimilation, most famously in the Maccabean Revolt by the Seleucid Empire. "In Jewish history, the banning of circumcision (brit milah) has historically been a first step toward more extreme and violent forms of persecution". These periods have generally been linked to suppression of Jewish religious, ethnic, and cultural identity and subsequent "punishment at the hands of government authorities for engaging in circumcision". The Maccabee victory in the Maccabean Revolt, which ended the prohibition against circumcision, is celebrated in Hanukkah. Circumcision rates are near-universal among Jews.

==== Alternative practice ====
Brit shalom (Hebrew: ברית שלום; "Covenant of Peace") is an alternative naming ceremony that does not involve circumcision.

=== Christianity ===
==== Ancient church ====
The circumcision controversy in early Christianity played an important role in Christian theology.

The circumcision of Jesus is celebrated as a feast day in the liturgical calendar of many Christian denominations, while the teachings of the Apostle Paul asserted that physical circumcision was unnecessary for the salvation of Gentiles and their membership in the New Covenant. The first Council of Jerusalem (c. 50) declared that circumcision was not necessary for new Gentile converts (as recorded in Acts 15); Pauline Christianity was instrumental in the split of early Christianity and Judaism and eventually became Christians' predominant position. Covenant theology largely views the Christian sacrament of baptism as fulfilling the Jewish practice of circumcision, as both serve as signs and seals of the covenant of grace.

While historically circumcision is not observed by the majority of Christians in most parts of the Christian world, and mainstream Christian denominations neither require it for religious observance nor forbid it for medical or cultural reasons, it is practiced among some Christian countries and communities. Some Oriental Christian denominations retained the practice, as part of a rite of passage. According to scholar Heather L. Armstrong of University of Southampton, about half of Christian males worldwide are circumcised, with most of them being located in Africa, Anglosphere countries (with notable prevalence in the United States) and the Philippines.

==== Modern Christianity ====
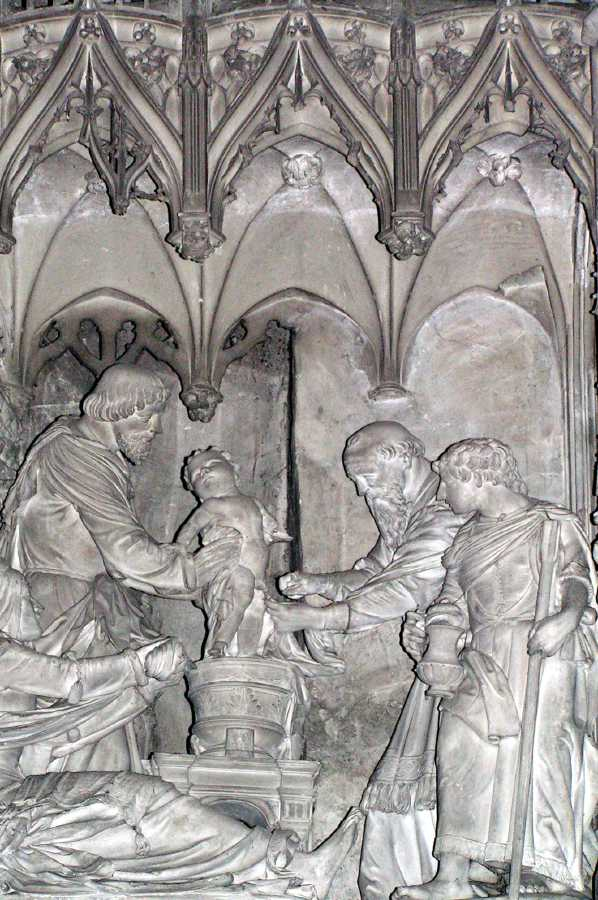
"Scène de la circoncision de Jésus", a sculpture in the Cathedral of Chartres.

Circumcision is considered a customary practice among Oriental Christian denominations such as the Coptic, Ethiopian, and Eritrean Orthodox churches. The practice is near-universal in the Ethiopian Orthodox Church. Some Christian churches in South Africa oppose circumcision, viewing it as a pagan ritual, while others, including the Nomiya church in Kenya, require circumcision. It is common in Cameroon, Democratic Republic of the Congo, Eritrea, Ghana, Liberia, and Nigeria.

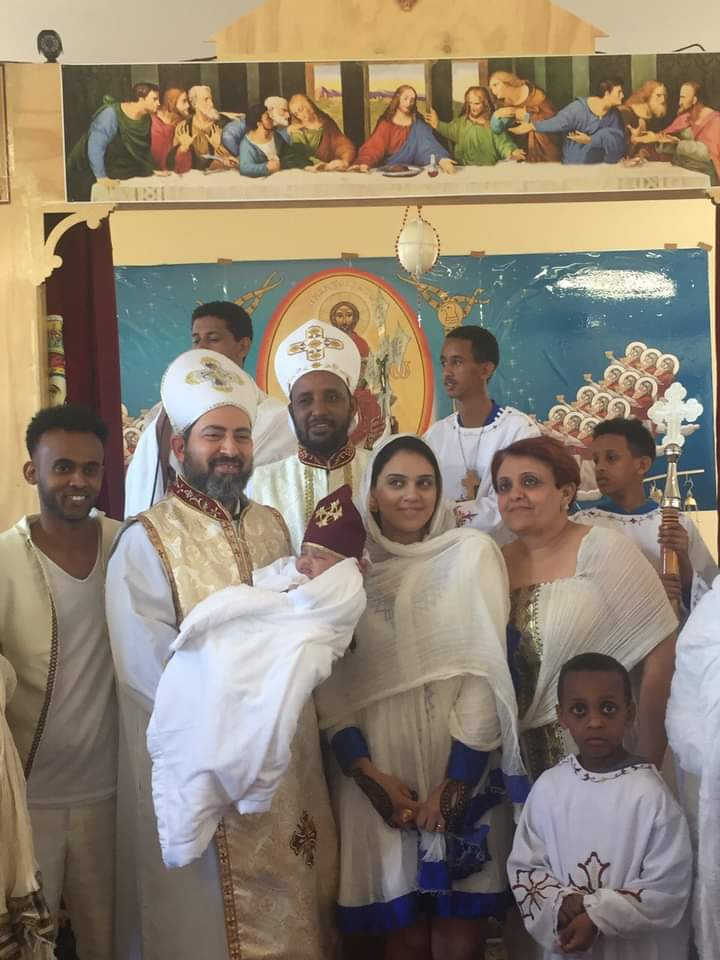
Ethiopian Orthodox children wearing traditional circumcision costumes

Circumcision is widely practiced among Christian communities in the Anglosphere, Oceania, South Korea, the Philippines, and the Middle East. Circumcision is rare in Europe, East Asia, as well as in India. Christians in the East and West Indies (excluding the Philippines) do not practice it. Circumcision is also widely practiced among Christian communities in Philippines, South Korea, Syria, Lebanon, Jordan, Palestine, Israel, and North Africa.

The Lutheran Church and the Greek Orthodox Church celebrate the Circumcision of Christ on 1 January, while Orthodox churches following the Julian calendar celebrate it on 14 January. All Orthodox churches consider it a "Great Feast". In much of Western Christianity, the Feast of the Circumcision of Christ has been replaced by other commemorations, such as the Solemnity of Mary in the Roman Catholic Church or the Feast of the Holy Name of Jesus in the Lutheran Churches. Exceptions, such as among most Traditionalist Catholics, who reject Novus Ordo and other changes following Vatican II to varying degrees, maintained the feast as a Holy day of obligation.

According to Scholar Heather L. Armstrong of University of Southampton, about half of Christian males worldwide are circumcised, with most of them being located in Africa, Anglosphere countries (with notable prevalence in the United States) and the Philippines. Many Christians have been circumcised for reasons such as family preferences, medical or cultural reasons. Circumcision is also part of a traditional practice among the adherents of certain Oriental Christian denominations, including those of Coptic Christianity, the Ethiopian Orthodox Church and Eritrean Orthodox Church.

==== Roman Catholic Church ====
The Roman Catholic Church denounced religious circumcision for its members in the Cantate Domino, written during the 11th Council of Florence in 1442, warning of loss of salvation for converts who observe it. This decision was based on the belief that baptism had superseded circumcision (Col 2:11–12), and may also have been a response to Coptic Christians, who continued to practice circumcision.

Origen stated in his work Contra Celsum that circumcision "was discontinued by Jesus, who desired that His disciples should not practise it."

Pope Pius XII taught that circumcision is only §"[morally] permissible if, in accordance with therapeutic principles, it prevents a disease that cannot be countered in any other way."

On another occasion, he stated:

Furthermore, Christian doctrine establishes, and the light of human reason makes it most clear, that private individuals have no other power over the members of their own bodies than that which pertains to their natural ends: and they are not free to destroy or mutilate their members, or in any other way render themselves unfit for their natural functions, except when no other provision can be made for the good of the whole body.

The Church has been viewed as maintaining a neutral position on the practice of cultural circumcision, due to its policy of inculturation, although some Catholic scholars argue that the church condemns it as "elective male infant circumcision not only violates the proper application of the time-honored principle of totality, but even fits the ethical definition of mutilation, which is gravely sinful."

Fr. John J. Dietzen, a priest and columnist, argued that paragraph number 2297 from the Catholic Catechism (Respect for bodily integrity) makes the practice of elective and neonatal circumcision immoral. John Paul Slosar and Daniel O'Brien, counter that the therapeutic benefits of neonatal circumcision are inconclusive, but that recent findings that circumcision may prevent disease puts the practice outside the realm of paragraph 2297. They claim that the "Respect for bodily integrity" paragraph apply in the context of kidnapping, hostage-taking or torture, and that if circumcision is included, any removal of tissue or follicle could be considered a violation of moral law. The proportionality of harm versus benefit of medical procedures, as defined by Directives 29 and 33 of the Ethical and Religious Directives for Catholic Health Care Services (National Conference of Catholic Bishops), have been interpreted to support and reject circumcision. These arguments represent the conscience of the individual writers, and not official doctrine. The most recent statement from the Church was that of Pope Emeritus Benedict XVI:

The Church of Antioch sent Barnabas on a mission with Paul, which became known as the Apostle's first missionary journey . . . Together with Paul, he then went to the so-called Council of Jerusalem where after a profound examination of the question, the Apostles with the Elders decided to discontinue the practice of circumcision so that it was no longer a feature of the Christian identity (cf. Acts 15: 1-35). It was only in this way that, in the end, they officially made possible the Church of the Gentiles, a Church without circumcision; we are children of Abraham simply through faith in Christ.

==== Latter Day Saints ====
Passages from scriptures connected with the Latter Day Saint movement (Mormons) explain that the "law of circumcision is done away" by Christ and thus unnecessary.

=== Druze ===
Circumcision is widely practiced by the Druze: practiced as a cultural tradition, and has no religious significance. No special interval is specified: Druze infants are usually circumcised shortly after birth, however some remain uncircumcised until age ten or older. Some Druses do not circumcise their male children, and refuse to observe this "common Muslim practice".

=== Islam ===
The origin of circumcision in Islam is a matter of religious and scholarly debate. It is mentioned in some hadith and the sunnah, but not in the Quran, though some believe it is implied by the command to "follow the way of Ibrahim, the true in Faith". In the time of Muhammad, circumcision was carried out by Pagan Arabian tribes, and by the Jewish tribes of Arabia for religious reasons. This was attested by al-Jahiz and by Jewish historian Flavius Josephus.

The four schools of Islamic jurisprudence have different views towards circumcision. Some state that it is recommendable, others that it is permissible but not binding, while others regard it as a legal obligation. According to Shafi'i and Hanbali jurists male circumcision is obligatory for Muslims, while Hanafi jurists consider circumcision to be recommendable. Some Salafis have argued that circumcision is required in Islam to provide ritual cleanliness based on the covenant with Abraham.

Whereas Jewish circumcision is closely bound by ritual timing and tradition, Islam states no fixed age for circumcision. In Muslim communities, children are often circumcised in late childhood or early adolescence. It varies by family, region, and country. The age when boys get circumcised, and the procedures used, tend to change across cultures, families, and time. In some Muslim-majority countries, circumcision is performed after boys have learned to recite the Quran from start to finish. In Malaysia and other regions, the boy usually undergoes the operation between the ages of ten and twelve, and is thus a puberty rite, serving to introduce him in the adult world. The procedure is sometimes semi-public, accompanied with music, special foods, and much festivity.

Islam has no equivalent of a Jewish mohel. Circumcisions are usually carried out in health facilities or hospitals, and performed by trained medical practitioners. The circumciser can be either male or female, and is not required to be a Muslim, and circumcision is not required of converts to Islam.

=== Bahai Faith ===
Circumcision is not a religious practice of the Bahá'í Faith, and leaves that decision to the parents.

=== Samaritanism ===
Like Judaism, the religion of Samaritanism requires ritual circumcision on the eighth day of life.

== Ancient Egyptian religion ==
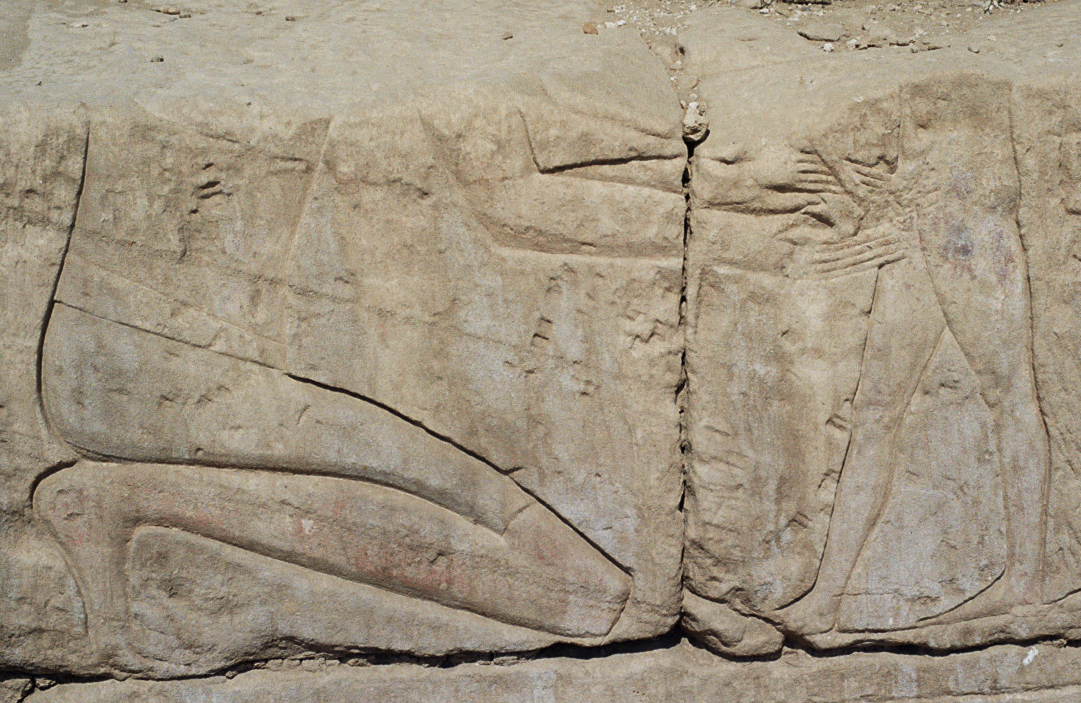
Ancient Egyptian carved scene of circumcision, from the inner northern wall of the Temple of Khonspekhrod at the Precinct of Mut, Luxor, Egypt. Eighteenth dynasty, Amenhotep III, c. 1360 BCE.

Sixth Dynasty (2345–2181 BCE) tomb artwork in Egypt is thought to be the oldest documentary evidence of circumcision. The most ancient depiction is a bas-relief from the necropolis at Saqqara (c. 2400 BCE) with the inscription "Hold him and do not allow him to faint". The oldest written account, by an Egyptian named Uha, in the 23rd century BCE, describes a mass circumcision and boasts of his ability to stoically endure the pain: "When I was circumcised, together with one hundred and twenty men ... there was none thereof who hit out, there was none thereof who was hit, and there was none thereof who scratched and there was none thereof who was scratched."

Circumcision in ancient Egypt was thought to be a rite of passage from childhood to adulthood. The alteration of the body and ritual of circumcision was supposed to give access to ancient mysteries reserved for the initiated. The content of those mysteries are unclear but are likely to be myths, prayers, and incantations central to Egyptian religion. The Egyptian Book of the Dead, for example, tells of the sun god Ra performing a self-circumcision, whose blood created two minor guardian deities. Circumcisions were performed by priests in a public ceremony, using a stone blade. It is thought to have been more popular among society's upper echelons, although it was not universal and those lower down the social order also had the procedure.

== Indian religions ==
==== Hinduism ====
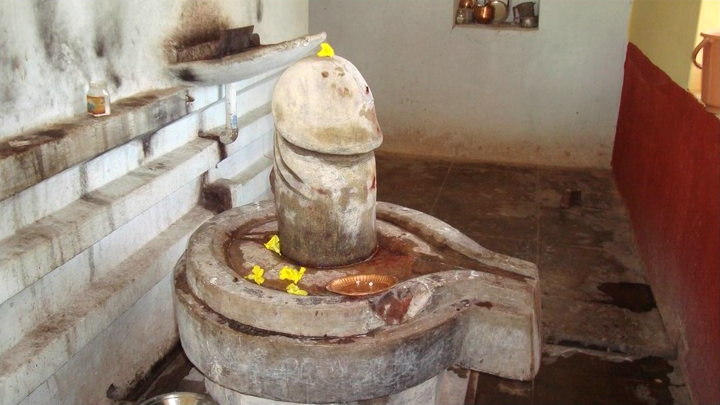
Sculptural representation of lingam, male sex organ-placed on yoni, female sex organ. In Hinduism, lingam and yoni represent the masculine and the feminine creative principles respectively.

In Hinduism, the Upanishads say that the nature of the higher self (Brahman), in essence, is bliss (ānanda), which the self in each being (Atman) experiences during dreamless deep sleep but remains unconscious of, consciously experiencing it during sensual activity. The Upanishads say that in humans, just as eyes correspond to the experience of sight, nose with smell, ears with sound, and tongue with taste, the genitals correspond to "bliss, delight and procreation". The Brihadaranyaka Upanishad says that in humans, genitals are the "single locus of pleasure (ānanda)". In Sanskrit literature, the penis is called Upastha ("that which stands up") and is traditionally considered a "source of great power or vitality (ojas)." In Yoga physiology, the penis corresponds with svadhishthana chakra, and channels the flow of nadis, which enable higher sensations and consciousness. Consequently, circumcision, or even an interference with a tight foreskin, is strictly forbidden in Hindu traditions.

==== Buddhism ====
Buddhism neither requires nor prohibits circumcision, and it contains no canonical injunction regarding circumcision; the Pali Vinaya, which governs monastic conduct in detail, makes no mention of the practice.

==== Sikhism ====
Sikhism does not require circumcision of its followers and strongly criticizes the practice. The Guru Granth Sahib criticizes circumcision in a hymn. The holy book of Sikhs, dating to 1708, bans circumcision as an Islamic custom, saying: "If God wished me to be a Muslim, it would be cut off by itself."

== By region ==
=== Africa ===
In West Africa, infant circumcision had religious significance as a rite of passage or otherwise in the past; today in some non-Muslim Nigerian societies it is medicalised and is simply a cultural norm.

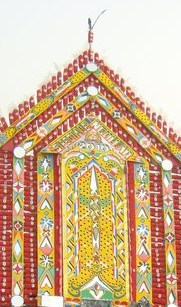
The Mbot masque. Symbol of the Ndut initiation rite.

Amongst the Serer ethnoreligious group of Senegal, Gambia, Mauritania, and Guinea-Bissau, the Ndut initiation rite has Serer religious, cultural, and educational significance - which Serer boys must undergo when they reach thirteen years of age, and usually conducted in groups, in a temporary Serer sanctuary called "ndut" (literally, "nest") - which is burnt after the sacred rite is completed and the boys have been discharged back to their families. It is in this sacred place that the circumcision takes place as Serer custom dictates. The nest (ndut) is burn down after the ritual is over, because Serer custom dictates that, a boy cannot be circumcised in the same nest his father was circumcised in. It is in classical Ndut teachings that many aspects of Serer ancient history, Serer cosmogony - including the history and mysteries of the universe are taught. It is from this tradition that the ultra-religious, ultra-conservative, Serer Njuup music tradition originated, which would become the progenitor of the Mbalax music genre of the Senegambia region.

In many West African traditional societies circumcision has become medicalised and is simply performed in infancy without ado or any particular conscious cultural significance. Among the Urhobo of southern Nigeria it is symbolic of a boy entering into manhood. The ritual expression, Omo te Oshare ("the boy is now man"), constitutes a rite of passage from one age set to another.

In East Africa, specifically in Kenya among various Bantu and Nilotic peoples, such as the Maragoli and Idakho of the Luhya, the Kikuyu, Kalenjin, and Maasai, circumcision is a rite of passage observed collectively by a number of boys every few years, and boys circumcised at the same time are taken to be members of a single age set.

Authority derives from the age-group and the age-set. Prior to circumcision a natural leader or Olaiguenani is selected; he leads his age-group through a series of rituals until old age, sharing responsibility with a select few, of whom the ritual expert (Oloiboni) is the ultimate authority. Masai youths are not circumcised until they are mature, and a new age-set is initiated together at regular intervals of twelve to fifteen years. The young warriors (Il-Murran) remain initiates for some time, using blunt arrows to hunt small birds which are stuffed and tied to a frame to form a head-dress. Traditionally, among the Luhya, boys of certain age-sets, typically between 8 and 18 years of age would, under the leadership of specific men engage in various rites leading up to the day of circumcision. After circumcision, they would live apart from the rest of society for a certain number of days. Not even their mothers nor sisters would be allowed to see them.

The Xhosa Tribe from the Eastern Cape in South Africa has a circumcision ritual. The ceremony is part of a transition to manhood. It is called the Abakwetha - "A Group Learning". A group of normally five aged between 16 and 20 go off for three months and live in a special hut (sutu). The circumcision is the climax of the ritual. Nelson Mandela describes his experiences undergoing this ritual in his biography, Long Walk to Freedom. Traditional circumcisions are often performed in unsterile conditions where no anesthetic is administered; improper treatment of the wound can lead to sepsis and dehydration, which has in the past lead to initiate deaths.

Among some West African animist groups, such as the Dogon and Dowayo, circumcision represents a removal of "feminine" aspects of the male, turning boys into fully masculine males.

=== Asia ===
Neither the Avesta nor the Zoroastrian Pahlavi texts mention circumcision. Traditionally, Zoroastrians do not practice circumcision. Circumcision is not required in Yazidism, but is practised by some Yazidis due to regional customs.

Circumcision is forbidden in Mandaeism, and the sign of the Jews given to Abraham by God, circumcision, is considered abhorrent. According to the Mandaean doctrine a circumcised man cannot serve as a priest.

Circumcision in South Korea is largely the result of American cultural and military influence following the Korean War. Prevalence has been declining.

The origin of circumcision (tuli) in the Philippines is uncertain. One newspaper article speculates that it is due to the influence of Western colonisation. However, Antonio de Morga's 17th-century History of the Philippine Islands documents its existence in pre-Colonial Philippines, owing it to Islamic influence.

=== Oceania ===
Circumcision is part of initiation rites in some Pacific Island, and Australian aboriginal traditions in areas such as Arnhem Land, where the practice was introduced by Makassan traders from Sulawesi. Circumcision ceremonies among certain Australian aboriginal societies are noted for their painful nature, including subincision for some aboriginal peoples in the Western Desert.

In the Pacific, ritual circumcision is nearly universal in the Melanesian islands of Fiji and Vanuatu; participation in the traditional land diving on Pentecost Island is reserved for those who have been circumcised. Circumcision is also commonly practised in the Polynesian islands of Samoa, Tonga, Niue, and Tikopia. In Samoa, it is accompanied by a celebration.

In early 2007, it was announced that rural aidpost orderlies in the East Sepik Province of Papua New Guinea were to undergo training in circumcision with a view to introducing the procedure as a means of prophylaxis to reduce the likelihood of catching HIV/AIDS, which was becoming a significant problem in the country.

== See also ==
- History of circumcision
- Prevalence of circumcision
