= HspE7 =

Investigational HPV vaccine

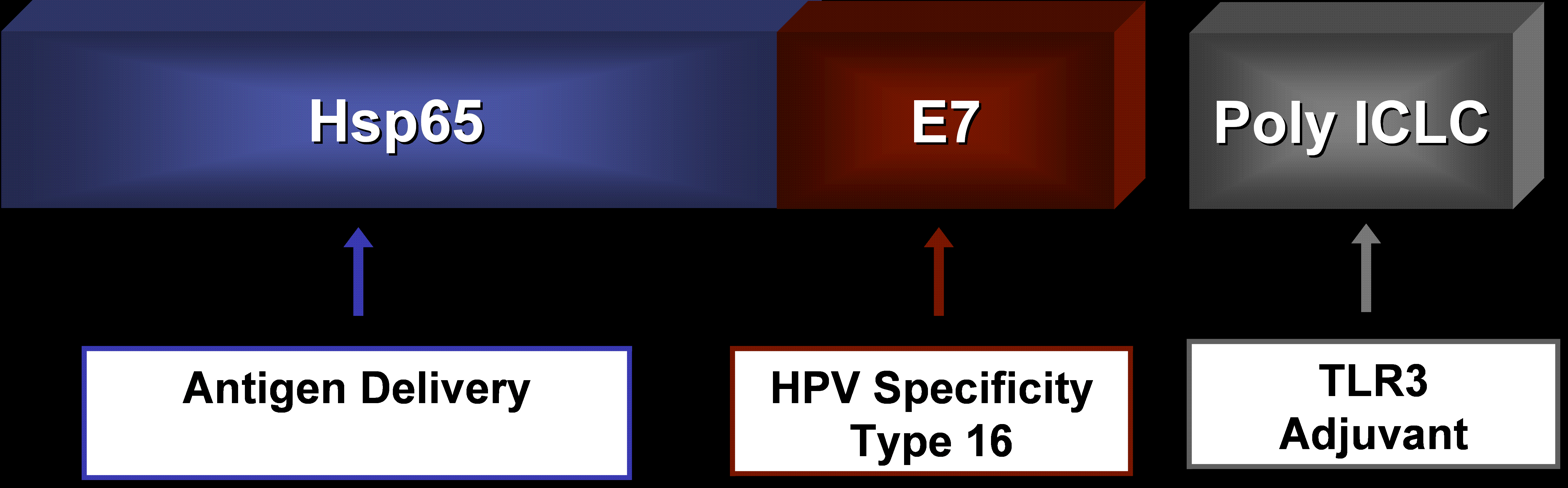

HspE7 is an investigational therapeutic vaccine candidate being developed by Nventa Biopharmaceuticals for the treatment of precancerous and cancerous lesions caused by the human papillomavirus (HPV). HspE7 uses recombinant DNA technology to covalently fuse a heat shock protein (Hsp) to a target antigen, thereby stimulating cellular immune system responses to specific diseases. HspE7 is a patented construct consisting of the HPV Type 16 E7 protein and heat shock protein 65 (Hsp65) and is currently the only candidate using Hsp technology to target the over 20 million Americans already infected with HPV.

The candidate is being developed with a Toll-like receptor 3 (TLR3) agonist adjuvant for multiple indications, including cervical intraepithelial neoplasia (also known as cervical dysplasia or CIN), genital warts, cervical cancer, and head and neck cancers.

== Therapeutic rationale ==
Over 100 different HPV types have been identified and are referred to by number. About a dozen HPV types, including types 16, 18, 31 and 45, are called "high-risk" types because they can lead to cervical cancer, as well as anal cancer, vulvar cancer, and penile cancer. Several types of HPV, particularly type 16, have been found to be associated with oropharyngeal squamous-cell carcinoma, a form of head and neck cancer. HPV-induced cancers often have viral sequences integrated into the cellular DNA. Some of the HPV "early" genes, such as E6 and E7, are known to act as oncogenes that promote tumor growth and malignant transformation.

An infection with one or more high-risk HPV types is believed to be a prerequisite for the development of cervical cancer (the vast majority of HPV infections are not high risk); according to the American Cancer Society, women with no history of the virus do not develop this type of cancer. However, most HPV infections are cleared rapidly by the immune system and do not progress to cervical cancer. Because the process of transforming normal cervical cells into cancerous ones is slow, cancer occurs in people who have been infected with HPV for a long time, usually over a decade or more.

HPV infection is a necessary factor in the development of nearly all cases of cervical cancer. A cervical Pap smear is used to detect cellular abnormalities. This allows targeted surgical removal of condylomatous and/or potentially precancerous lesions prior to the development of invasive cervical cancer. Although the widespread use of Pap testing has reduced the incidence and lethality of cervical cancer in developed countries, the disease still kills several hundred thousand women per year worldwide. HPV vaccines Gardasil and Cervarix, which block initial infection with some of the most common sexually transmitted HPV types, may lead to further decreases in the incidence of HPV-induced cancer, however, they do not address the millions of people worldwide already infected with the virus.

It is estimated that nearly 10 million women are diagnosed with some form of cervical dysplasia each year in major global markets in the U.S., EU and Japan, many of whom could benefit from a non-surgical treatment. As a result, HspE7 is first being developed for the treatment of CIN.

== Clinical progress ==
Nventa originally advanced HspE7 as a single-agent therapy into multiple Phase 2 clinical trials with positive results, including trials in cervical dysplasia and recurrent respiratory papillomatosis (RRP). These trials were initiated prior to the discovery that potency could be greatly enhanced by addition of a vaccine adjuvant, and, as a result, Nventa is currently developing HspE7 combined with the adjuvant Poly-ICLC.

A Phase 1b study has been completed assessing the safety and tolerability of HspE7 with Poly-ICLC in four cohorts totaling 17 patients with CIN. All patients were administered 500 mcg of HspE7 with each of the four cohorts receiving escalating doses of adjuvant – 50, 500, 1,000 and 2,000 mcg.

Nventa has indicated that it is currently working with the U.S. Food and Drug Administration (FDA) to finalize the trial design for a Phase 2 clinical study for HspE7 in patients with high grade cervical dysplasia (CIN 2/3).
