= Acepromazine =

Antipsychotic medication

- Skeletal structure of acepromazine

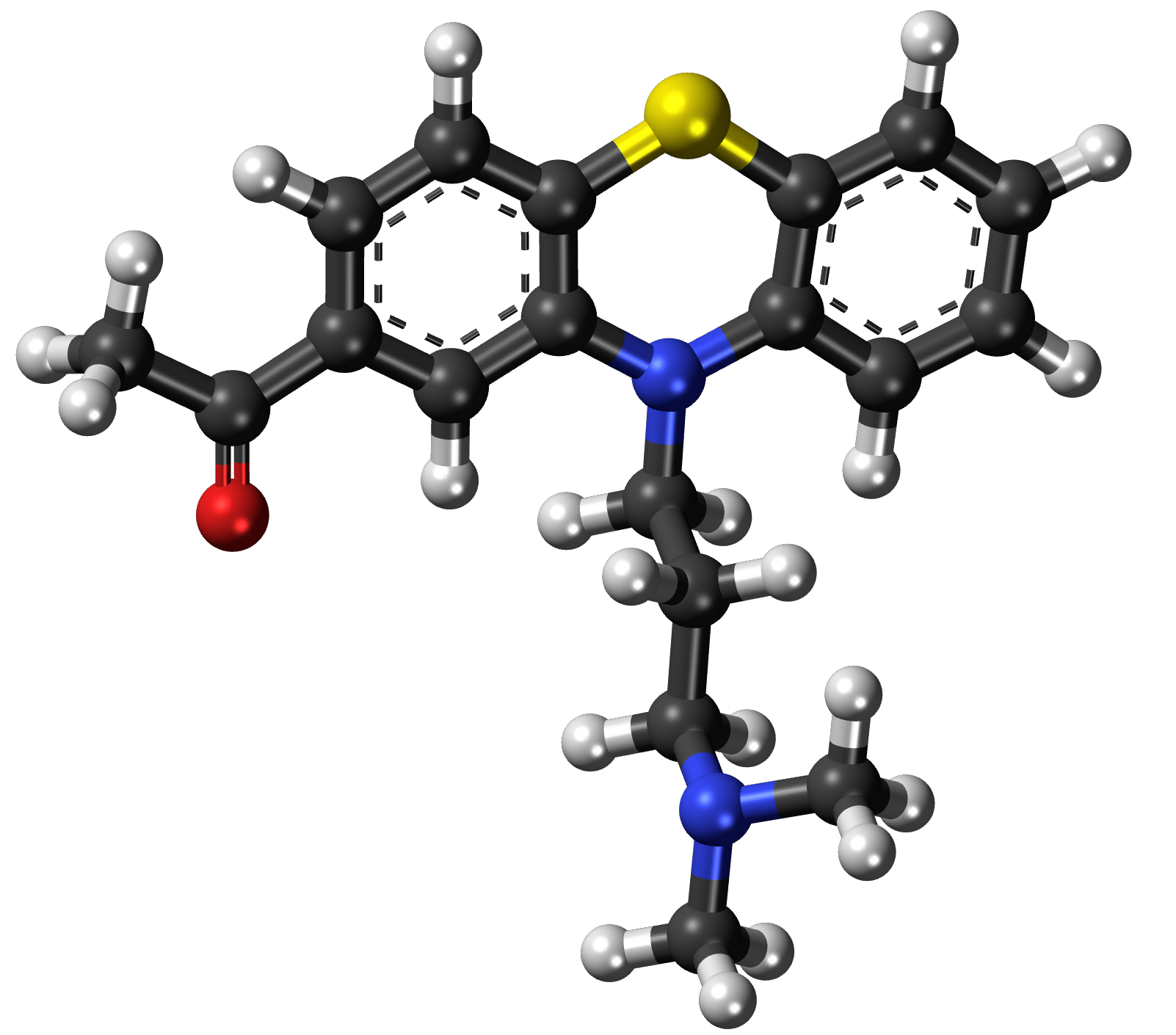
- 3D representation of an acepromazine molecule

Clinical data
- Trade names: Atravet, Acezine 2
- AHFS/Drugs.com: International Drug Names
- Routes of administration: IV, IM, SQ, oral
- ATC code: N05AA04 (WHO)

Legal status
- Legal status: AU: S4 (Prescription only); BR: Class C1 (Other controlled substances); CA: OTC; UK: POM (Prescription only); US: ℞-only

Pharmacokinetic data
- Bioavailability: 6.6 L/kg, high volume of distribution
- Elimination half-life: 3 hours in horses, 15.9 hours in canines
- Excretion: urine

Identifiers
- IUPAC name: 1-{10-[3-(Dimethylamino)propyl]-10H-phenothiazin-2-yl}ethanone
- CAS Number: 61-00-7
- PubChem CID: 6077
- DrugBank: DB01614
- ChemSpider: 5852
- UNII: 54EJ303F0R
- KEGG: D07065
- ChEBI: CHEBI:44932
- ChEMBL: ChEMBL39560
- CompTox Dashboard (EPA): DTXSID1022552
- ECHA InfoCard: 100.000.451

Chemical and physical data
- Formula: C_{19}H_{22}N_{2}OS
- Molar mass: 326.46 g·mol^{−1}
- 3D model (JSmol): Interactive image
- SMILES: O=C(c2cc1N(c3c(Sc1cc2)cccc3)CCCN(C)C)C
- InChI: InChI=1S/C19H22N2OS/c1-14(22)15-9-10-19-17(13-15)21(12-6-11-20(2)3)16-7-4-5-8-18(16)23-19/h4-5,7-10,13H,6,11-12H2,1-3H3; Key:NOSIYYJFMPDDSA-UHFFFAOYSA-N

Acepromazine, acetopromazine, or acetylpromazine (commonly known as ACP, Ace, or by the trade names Atravet or Acezine 2, number depending on mg/ml dose) is a phenothiazine derivative antipsychotic drug. It was used in humans during the 1950s as an antipsychotic, but is now almost exclusively used on animals as a sedative and antiemetic. A closely related analogue, chlorpromazine, is still used in humans.

The standard pharmaceutical preparation, acepromazine maleate, is used in veterinary medicine in dogs and cats. It is used widely in horses as a pre-anesthetic sedative and has been shown to reduce anesthesia related death. However, it should be used with caution (but is not absolutely contraindicated) in stallions due to the risk of paraphimosis and priapism. Its potential for cardiac effects can be profound, namely hypotension due to peripheral vasodilation, so it should be avoided or used with caution in geriatric or debilitated animals.

== Pharmacology ==
The clinical pharmacology of acepromazine is similar to that of other phenothiazine derived anti-psychotic agents. The primary behavioral effects are attributed to its potent antagonism of post-synaptic D_{2} receptors and, to a lesser degree, the other D_{2}-like receptors. Additional effects are related to its appreciable antagonistic effects on various other receptors, including the α_{1}-adrenergic receptors, H_{1} receptors, and muscarinic acetylcholine receptors. It is metabolized by the liver, oxidized to produce its primary metabolite, hydroxyethylpromazine sulfoxide, which is then excreted in the urine. Its action at the chemoreceptor trigger zone (in the area postrema) and the solitary nucleus (in the medulla oblongata) allow it to have an antiemetic effect.

== Veterinary use ==
Acepromazine is used as a sedative, pre-anaesthetic, anaesthetic adjunct, and tranquiliser. Acepromazine can commonly cause ataxia and rarely can cause tremors and dystonia.

=== Canine and feline ===
The most common uses of acepromazine in animals are as an oral sedative before stressful events (such as thunderstorms), an injectable tranquilizer for particularly aggressive or fractious animals, and in combination with analgesics and other sedatives. It is also labeled for use in preventing motion sickness, as it has an anti-emetic effect in small animals. It takes effect in about 10 minutes and lasts for 4–6 hours in small animals.

==== Adverse effects in cats ====
While acepromazine is also used in cats, its absorption is erratic and can vary between individuals. It also generally induces less sedation than in dogs. It also causes spontaneous motor activity (in both cats and dogs, but more often in cats) by blocking dopamine receptors in the striatum and substantia nigra.

==== Adverse effects in dogs ====
Literature from the 1950s raised concerns about phenothiazine-induced seizures in human patients. For this reason, caution has typically been advised when contemplating acepromazine use in epileptic canine patients, as it was widely believed to lower the seizures threshold. More current studies, however, have failed to show a positive association between use of acepromazine and seizure activity and show a possible role for acepromazine in seizure control: in a retrospective study at University of Tennessee, acepromazine was administered for tranquilization to 36 dogs with a prior history of seizures and to decrease seizure activity in 11 dogs. No seizures were seen within 16 hours of acepromazine administration in the 36 dogs that received the drug, and the seizures abated for 1.5 to 8 hours (n=6) or did not recur (n=2) in eight of 10 dogs that were actively seizing. Excitement-induced seizures were reduced for 2 months in one dog. A second retrospective study also concluded that administration of acepromazine to dogs with prior or acute seizure history did not potentiate seizures, and there was some trend toward seizure reduction. The original seizure cautions reported in the 1950s were in human patients on relatively high doses of the antipsychotic chlorpromazine while the doses of acepromazine used in the two published veterinary studies cited above are much lower.

Acepromazine (left) and its major metabolite, hydroxyethylpromazine sulfoxide (right)

In some boxers, acepromazine can cause vasovagal syncope (due to a decreased stimulation of the sympathetic nervous system) and hypotension (due to vasodilation), leading to collapse. This may occur only in certain families of boxers, but the unknown risk to an individual dog means that acepromazine should be used at reduced doses, or not at all, in this breed. Individual dogs of any breed can have a profound reaction characterized by hypotension, especially if there is an underlying heart problem.

In giant-breed dogs and sighthounds, the sedative effects of acepromazine may last for 12–24 hours, which is much longer than the usual 3–4 hours.

==== Dogs with a mutation in the ABCB1 (MDR1) gene ====
P-glycoprotein (P-gp), also known as multidrug resistant protein 1 (MDR1), is a protein found in cell membranes which is important in the metabolism and excretion of some drugs, such as acepromazine and ivermectin. This protein is encoded by the ABCB1 gene (previously known as the MDR1 gene). A mutation in ABCB1 prevents P-gp from being correctly produced, so that dogs with this mutation have an increased sensitivity to drugs (such as acepromazine) which are substrates of P-gp. Dogs which are heterozygous (that is, which have one functioning ABCB1 gene, and one non-functioning gene) are less sensitive to acepromazine than dogs which are homozygous (that is, which have two copies of the mutant gene). 75% of Collies carry the mutated ABCB1 gene, as do 50% of Australian Shepherds. Other affected breeds include: Border Collie, English Shepherd, German Shepherd, Old English Sheepdog, and Sighthounds, shelties, long haired greyhound.

Tests for this mutation are available.

=== Equine ===
In equine surgery, premedication with acepromazine has been shown to reduce the perianaesthetic mortality rate, possibly due to its actions as a sedative and anxiolytic. It is less effective as a sedative if the horse is already excited.

Additionally, acepromazine is used as a vasodilator in the treatment of laminitis, where an oral dose equivalent to "mild sedation" is commonly used, although the dose used is highly dependent on the treating veterinarian. While it is shown to elicit vasodilation in the distal limb, evidence showing its efficacy at increasing perfusion in the laminae is lacking. It is also sometimes used to treat a horse experiencing equine exertional rhabdomyolysis.

Acepromazine has a withdrawal time of 7 days for meat and 48 hours for milk in the United States.

==== Adverse effects ====
Side effects are not common, but the use of acepromazine in stallions should be used with caution (but is not absolutely contraindicated) due to the risk of paraphimosis and priapism, as well as penile prolapse.

Acepromazine also lowers blood pressure, and should therefore be used with caution in horses that are experiencing anemia, dehydration, shock, or colic. It should not be used in horses dewormed with piperazine.
