= Penile cancer =

Carcinoma of the penis
- Specialty: Oncology
- Frequency: 36,068 in 2020
- Deaths: 13,211 (2020)

Penile cancer, or penile carcinoma, is a rare cancer that develops in the skin or tissues of the penis. Symptoms may include abnormal growth, an ulcer or sore on the skin of the penis, and bleeding or foul-smelling discharge.

Risk factors include phimosis (inability to retract the foreskin of the penis), chronic inflammation, smoking, HPV infection, condylomata acuminate, having multiple sexual partners, and early age of sexual intercourse.

Around 95% of penile cancers are squamous-cell carcinomas. Other types of penile cancer, such as Merkel-cell carcinoma, small-cell carcinoma, and melanoma, are generally rare. In 2020, it occurred in 36,000 men and caused 13,000 deaths.

== Signs and symptoms ==
Penile cancer can present as redness and irritation on the penis with a skin thickening on the glans or inner foreskin or an ulcerative, outward growing (exophytic) or "finger-like" (papillary) growth. Penile cancer may accompany penile discharge with or without difficulty or burning or tingling while urinating (dysuria) and bleeding from the penis.

== Risk factors ==
=== Infections ===
- HIV infection—HIV-positive men have an eight-fold increased risk of developing penile cancer compared to HIV-negative men.
- Human papillomavirus—HPV is a risk factor in the development of penile cancer. According to the Centers for Disease Control and Prevention (CDC), HPV is responsible for about 800 (about 40%) of 1,570 cases of penile cancer diagnosed annually in the United States. There are more than 120 types of HPV.
- Genital warts—Genital or perianal warts increase the risk of invasive penile cancer by about 3.7 times if they occurred more than two years before the reference date. About half of men with penile cancer also have genital warts, which are caused by HPV.

=== Hygiene and injury ===
- Poor hygiene—Poor hygiene can increase a man's risk of penile cancer.
- Smegma—Smegma, a whitish substance that can accumulate beneath the foreskin, is associated with a greater risk of penile cancer. The American Cancer Society suggests that smegma may not be carcinogenic, but may increase the risk by causing irritation and inflammation of the penis.
- Balanitis and penile injury—Inflammation of the foreskin and/or the glans penis (balanitis) is associated with about 3.1 times increased risk of penile cancer. It is usually caused by poor hygiene, allergic reactions to certain soaps, or an underlying health condition such as reactive arthritis, infection, or diabetes. Small tears and abrasions of the penis are associated with about 3.9 times increased risk of cancer.
- Phimosis—Phimosis is a medical condition where the foreskin cannot be fully retracted over the glans. It is considered a significant risk factor in the development of penile cancer (odds ratio of 38–65). Phimosis may also be a symptom of penile cancer.
- Paraphimosis—Paraphimosis is a medical condition where the foreskin becomes trapped behind the glans. It is considered a risk factor for the development of penile cancer.
- Circumcision—Some studies show that circumcision during infancy or in childhood may provide partial protection against penile cancer, but this is not the case when performed in adulthood. It has been suggested that the reduction in risk may be due to reduced risk of phimosis; other possible mechanisms include reduction in risk of smegma and HPV infection.

=== Other ===
- Age—Penile cancer is rarely seen in men under the age of 50. About 4 out of 5 men diagnosed with penile cancer are over the age of 55.
- Lichen sclerosus—Lichen sclerosus is a disease causing white patches on the skin. Lichen sclerosus increases the risk of penile cancer. As the exact cause of lichen sclerosus is unknown, there is no known way to prevent it.
- Tobacco—Chewing or smoking tobacco increases the risk of penile cancer by 1.5–6 times, depending on the duration of smoking and the daily number of cigarettes.
- Ultraviolet light—Men with psoriasis who have been treated using UV light and a drug known as psoralen have an increased risk of penile cancer.

== Pathogenesis ==
Penile cancer arises from precursor lesions, which generally progress from low-grade to high-grade lesions. For HPV related penile cancers, this sequence is as follows:

1. Squamous hyperplasia;
2. Low-grade penile intraepithelial neoplasia (PIN);
3. High-grade PIN (carcinoma in situ—Bowen's disease, Erythroplasia of Queyrat and bowenoid papulosis (BP));
4. Invasive carcinoma of the penis.

However, in some cases, non-dysplastic or mildly dysplastic lesions may progress directly into cancer. Examples include flat penile lesions (FPL) and condylomata acuminata.

In HPV negative cancers, the most common precursor lesion is lichen sclerosus (LS).

== Diagnosis ==
The International Society of Urological Pathology (ISUP) recommends the use of p16^{INK4A} immunostaining for the diagnosis and classification of HPV-related penile cancer.

=== Classification ===
Around 95% of penile cancers are squamous-cell carcinomas. They are classified into the following types:

- basaloid (4%)
- warty (6%)
- mixed warty-basaloid (17%)
- verrucous (8%)
- papillary (7%)
- other SCC mixed (7%)
- sarcomatoid carcinomas (1%)
- not otherwise specified (49%)

Other types of carcinomas are rare and may include small-cell, Merkel-cell, clear-cell, sebaceous-cell or basal-cell tumors. Non-epithelial malignancies such as melanomas and sarcomas are even rarer.

==== Staging ====
Like many cancers, penile cancer can spread to other parts of the body. It is usually a primary malignancy, the initial place from which cancer spreads in the body. Much less often, it is a secondary malignancy, one in which the cancer has spread to the penis from elsewhere. The extent of tumor invasion, nodal metastasis, and distant metastasis determines the staging of penile cancer.

The T portion of the AJCC TNM staging guidelines are for the primary tumor as follows:

- TX: Primary tumor cannot be assessed.
- T0: No evidence of primary tumor.
- Tis: Carcinoma in situ.
- Ta: Noninvasive verrucous carcinoma.
- T1a: Tumor invades subepithelial connective tissue without lymph vascular invasion and is not poorly differentiated (i.e., grade 3–4).
- T1b: Tumor invades subepithelial connective tissue with lymph vascular invasion or is poorly differentiated.
- T2: Tumor invades the corpus spongiosum, with or without invasion of the urethra.
- T3: Tumor invades the corpora cavernosa, with or without invasion of the urethra.
- T4: Tumor invades other adjacent structures.

Anatomic Stage or Prognostic Groups of penile cancer are as follows:

- Stage 0—Carcinoma in situ.
- Stage I—The cancer is moderately or well-differentiated and only affects the subepithelial connective tissue.
- Stage II—The cancer is poorly differentiated, affects lymphatics, or invades the corpora or urethra.
- Stage IIIa—There is deep invasion into the penis and metastasis in one lymph node.
- Stage IIIb—There is deep invasion into the penis and metastasis into multiple inguinal lymph nodes.
- Stage IV—The cancer has invaded into structures adjacent to the penis, metastasized to pelvic nodes, or distant metastasis is present.

==== HPV positive tumors ====
Human papillomavirus prevalence in penile cancers is high and is involved in approximately 40% of penile cancers. HPV16 is the predominant genotype accounting for approximately 63% of HPV-positive tumors. Among warty/basaloid cancers, the HPV prevalence is 70–100% while in other types it is around 30%.

== Prevention ==
- HPV vaccines such as Gardasil or Cervarix may reduce the risk of HPV and, consequently, penile cancer.
- The use of condoms is thought to be protective against HPV-associated penile cancer.
- Good genital hygiene, which involves washing the penis, the scrotum, and the foreskin daily with water, may prevent balanitis and penile cancer. However, soaps with harsh ingredients should be avoided.
- Cessation of smoking may reduce the risk of penile cancer.
- Circumcision during infancy or in childhood may provide partial protection against penile cancer. Several authors have proposed circumcision as a possible strategy for penile cancer prevention; however, the American Cancer Society points to the rarity of the disease and notes that neither the American Academy of Pediatrics nor the Canadian Academy of Pediatrics recommend routine neonatal circumcision.
- Phimosis can be prevented by practising proper hygiene and by retracting the foreskin regularly.
- Paraphimosis can be prevented by not leaving the foreskin retracted for prolonged periods.

== Treatment ==
Treatment of penile cancer will vary depending on the clinical stage of the tumor at the time of diagnosis. There are several treatment options for penile cancer, depending on staging. They include surgery, radiation therapy, chemotherapy, and biological therapy. The most common treatment is one of five types of surgery:

- Wide local excision—the tumor and some surrounding healthy tissue are removed
- Microsurgery—surgery performed with a microscope is used to remove the tumor and as little healthy tissue as possible
- Laser surgery—laser light is used to burn or cut away cancerous cells
- Circumcision—cancerous foreskin is removed
- Amputation (penectomy)—a partial or total removal of the penis, and possibly the associated lymph nodes.

The role of radiation therapy includes an organ-sparing approach for early-stage penile cancer at specialized centres. Furthermore, adjuvant therapy is used for patients with locally advanced disease or for symptom management.

== Prognosis ==
Prognosis can vary considerably for patients, depending on the person's stage of cancer. Generally speaking, the earlier the cancer is diagnosed, the better the prognosis. The overall 5-year survival rate for all stages of penile cancer is about 50%.

== Epidemiology ==
Penile cancer is a rare cancer in developed nations, with annual incidence varying from 0.3 to 1 per 100,000 per year, accounting for around 0.4–0.6% of all malignancies. The annual incidence is approximately 1 in 100,000 men in the United States, 1 in 250,000 in Australia, and 0.82 per 100,000 in Denmark. In the United Kingdom, fewer than 500 men are diagnosed with penile cancer every year.

In the developing world, penile cancer is much more common. For instance, in Paraguay, Uruguay, Uganda and Brazil the incidence is 4.2, 4.4, 2.8 and 1.5–3.7 per 100,000, respectively. In some South American countries, Africa, and Asia, this cancer type constitutes up to 10% of malignant diseases in men.

As of 1997, the lifetime risk was estimated as 1 in 1,437 in the United States and 1 in 1,694 in Denmark.

== See also ==
- Male breast cancer
- Testicular cancer
- Urethral cancer
- Vulvar cancer
