= Dorsal slit =

Incision on penis foreskin exposing the glans

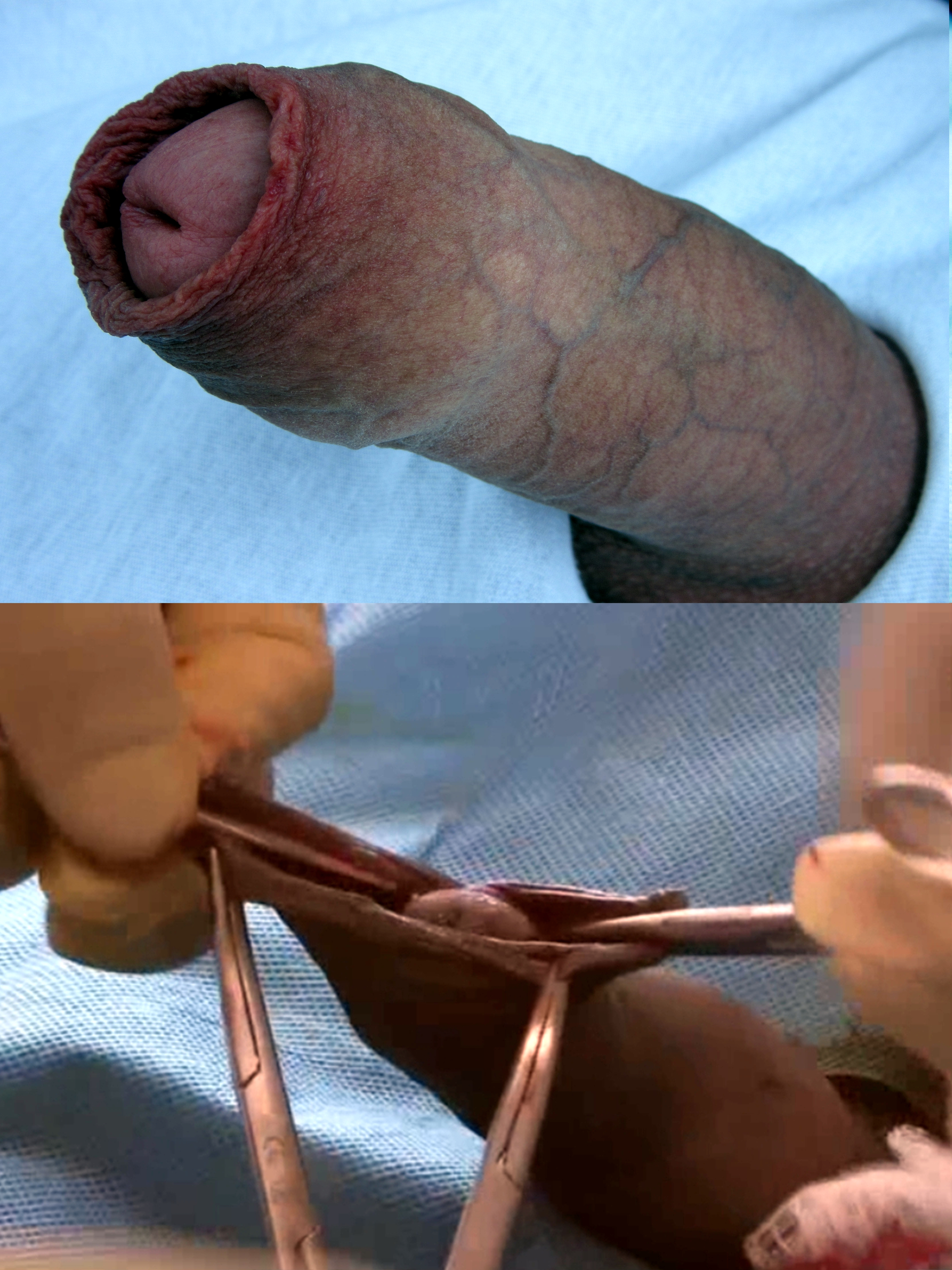
The dorsal slit

A dorsal slit (often referred to in anthropology as superincision or supercision) is a single incision along the upper length of the foreskin from the tip to the corona, exposing the glans without removing any tissue. An ancient practice, it has been a traditional custom among a number of peoples, particularly Filipinos and Pacific Islanders, probably for thousands of years.

In Western medicine, it was used as an alternative to circumcision to relieve conditions such as failure of the foreskin to retract (phimosis) or failure to cover the glans penis (paraphimosis), although a perception of poor appearance limited its popularity. While it is a less invasive surgery than circumcision, it is more invasive than preputioplasty since it leaves the incision open. It is still used when circumcision or other measures are considered impractical or undesirable.

== Traditional custom ==
Since superincision and circumcision are both forms of genital cutting that expose the glans, it can often be difficult to know which procedure is being described or depicted. Opinion is divided on whether a 4,000-year-old image from Egypt, often described as the first depiction of circumcision, may in fact be of a superincision.

Superincision has been widely practised by people of the Pacific, stretching from Hawaii to the Philippines (where it is called tuli). With increasing urbanisation, traditional rituals have been giving way in many places to medically performed circumcision, and almost entirely so among Islanders living in New Zealand, where a recent survey found there was "a strong cultural demand from parents". The most notable exception to Pacific superincision is the Māori of New Zealand, who do not circumcise or superincise, although they have an indigenous term for the latter (ure haea or "split penis") and their tradition is that they stopped the practice when they arrived in New Zealand.

== Medical practice ==
=== Phimosis ===
Dorsal slit has a long history as a treatment for adult phimosis, since compared with circumcision it was relatively easy to perform, did not risk damage to the frenulum, and before the invention of antibiotics was less likely to become infected. However, the literature often indicates that despite being "a simple operation" it was "not liked by some", or refers to the "untidy apron-like appearance" it could produce.

Dorsal slit has become rare in Western countries as a treatment for phimosis. Standard guidelines suggest conservative approaches first and, should those fail, either circumcision or alternatively preputioplasty to both retain the foreskin and relieve the phimosis.

=== Paraphimosis and other conditions ===
In some cases the foreskin may become swollen as a result of paraphimosis (foreskin trapped behind the glans) or other conditions such as severe balanitis. Should reduction of the swelling by conservative methods be unsuccessful, a dorsal slit is a common intervention of choice since circumcision is almost always excluded in such cases. While it was formerly recommended that circumcision be subsequently performed once the originating condition has subsided, this appears to be no longer the case.

=== Dorsal genital slits in some African tribes ===
A variety of "dorsal slit" circumcision was once predominant amongst the Maasai tribe of Kenya and Tanzania, and is still practised and found in many of the more remote regions of the very large area known as "Maasailand" generally.

However, the Maasai operation is different in this: rather than a dorsal slit from the opening of the prepuce to the corona, a heart shaped "oval" is excised from the dorsum of the prepuce and the glans is pushed through this hole. Later the edges of the cut prepuce will heal.

The prepuce is first cut off, leaving only a small part where the main veins are located, which is pulled down and the small hole through which the glans in pushed through is created. The remaining part is left hanging down, but the glans exposed.

Formerly tribes that copied the Maasai like the numerous Kikuyu, Embu and Meru of Kenya also practised the same form of circumcision. Photos of the operation and result are numerously found in specialized African books, such as Carol Beckwith and Tepelit Ole Saitoti's Maasai.

There are words for the resultant "preputial flap" in the Maa and Gikuyu languages, and possibly in other African tongues. In Gikuyu the word, now archaic, is likely to be ngwati.

== Reversal ==
According to Goodwin, the dorsal slit operation may be reversed by suturing the cut ends together, which restores the tissue to its normal position and recreates the function of the foreskin.
