= Paraphimosis =

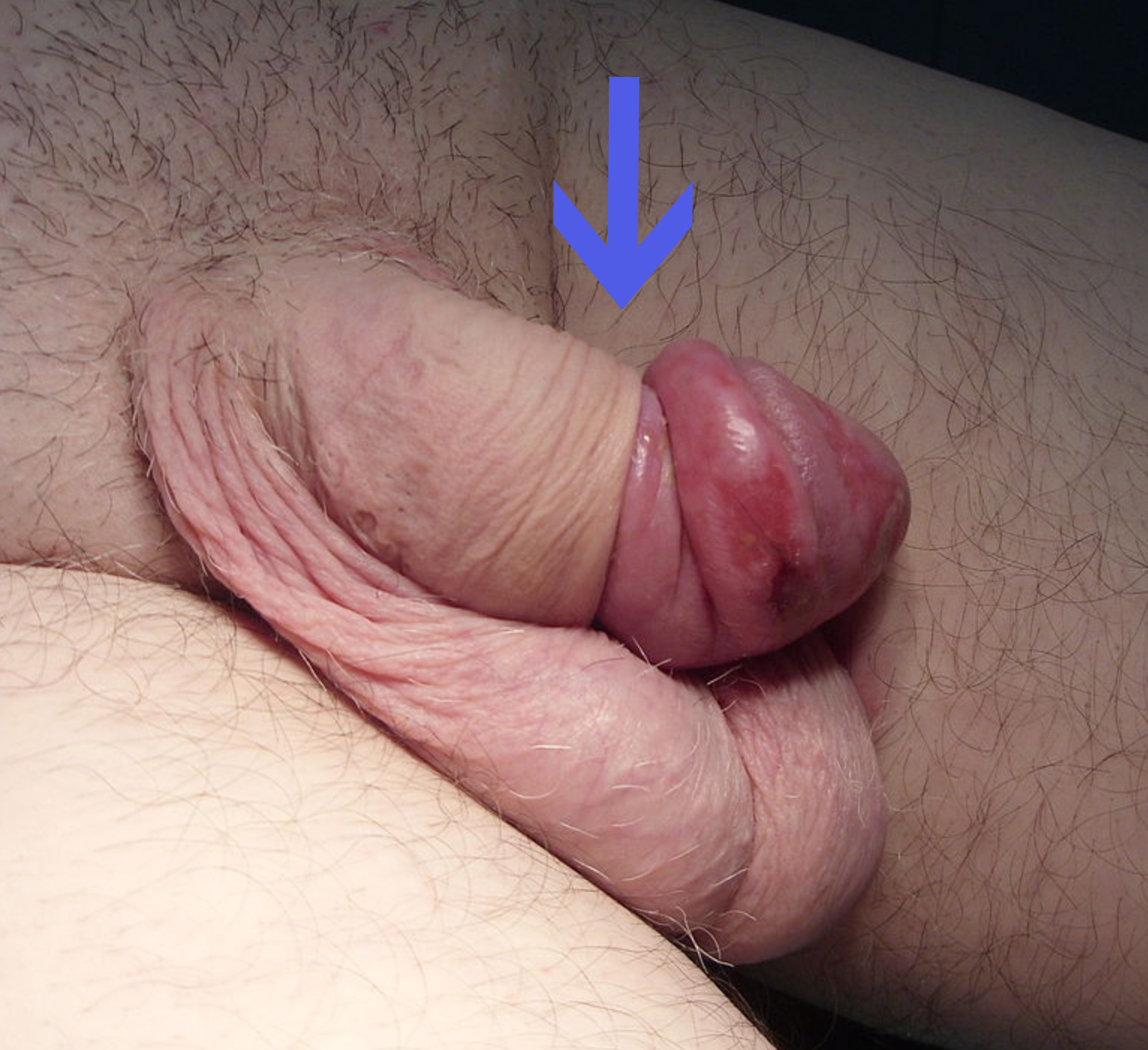
- Pronunciation: /ˌpærəfaɪˈmoʊsɪs/ or /ˌpærəfəˈmoʊsɪs/
- Specialty: Urology
- Complications: Gangrene of the glans penis
- Types: Physiological, pathological
- Causes: Iatrogenic, handling foreskin improperly
- Risk factors: Phimosis, uncircumcised
- Prevention: Returning foreskin to unretracted position after retraction, foreskin stretching, circumcision
- Treatment: Manual reduction, circumcision
- Frequency: 0.2% (uncircumcised children)

Paraphimosis is an uncommon medical condition in which the foreskin of a penis becomes trapped behind the glans penis, and cannot be reduced (pulled back to its normal flaccid position covering the glans). If this condition persists for several hours or there is any sign of a lack of blood flow, paraphimosis should be treated as a medical emergency, as it can result in gangrene.

== Causes ==
Paraphimosis is usually caused by medical professionals (iatrogenic) or parents who handle the foreskin improperly. The foreskin may be retracted during penile examination, penile cleaning, urethral catheterization, or cystoscopy; if the foreskin is left retracted for a long period, some of the foreskin tissue may become oedematous (swollen with fluid), which makes subsequent reduction of the foreskin difficult.

== Prevention and treatment ==
Paraphimosis can be avoided by bringing the foreskin back into its normal, forward, non-retracted position after retraction is no longer necessary (for instance, after cleaning the glans penis or placing a Foley catheter). Phimosis (both pathologic and normal childhood physiologic forms) is a risk factor for paraphimosis; physiologic phimosis resolves naturally as a child matures, but it may be advisable to treat pathologic phimosis via long-term stretching or elective surgical techniques (such as preputioplasty to loosen the preputial orifice or circumcision to amputate the foreskin tissue partially or completely).

The foreskin responds to the application of tension to cause expansion by creating new skin cells though the process of mitosis. The tissue expansion is permanent. Non-surgical stretching of the foreskin may be used to widen a narrow, non-retractable foreskin. Stretching may be combined with the use of a corticosteroid cream. Beaugé recommends manual stretching for young males in preference to circumcision as a treatment for non-retractile foreskin because of the preservation of sexual sensation.

Paraphimosis can often be effectively treated by manual manipulation of the swollen foreskin tissue. This involves compressing the glans penis and moving the foreskin back to its normal position, perhaps with the aid of a lubricant, cold compression, and local anesthesia as necessary. If this fails, the tight edematous band of tissue can be relieved surgically with a dorsal slit, or a circumcision. An alternative method, the Dundee technique, entails placing multiple punctures in the swollen foreskin with a fine needle, and then expressing the edema fluid by manual pressure. According to Ghory and Sharma, treatment by circumcision may be elected as "a last resort, to be performed by a urologist". Other experts recommend delaying elective circumcision until after paraphimosis has been resolved. A non-invasive method is the application of granulated sugar to induce transfer of the hypotonic fluid out of the edematous tissue towards the wet sugar via osmotic gradient, to reduce swelling and enabling manual reduction.
