= Preputioplasty =

Surgical procedure

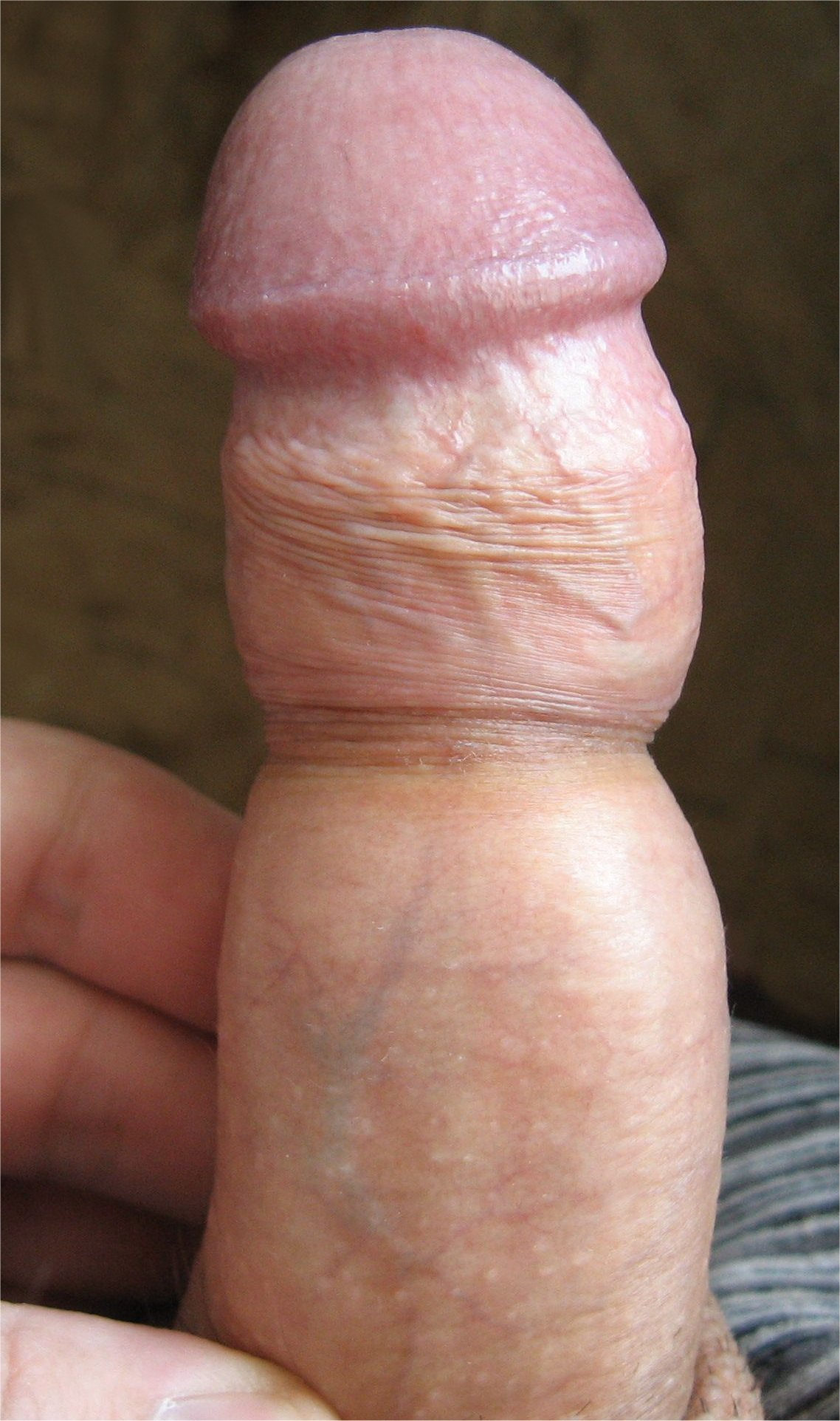
- Phimotic foreskin retracted from glans with stenosis creating a "waist"
- Specialty: Urology

Preputioplasty or prepuce plasty, also known as limited dorsal slit with transverse closure, is a plastic surgical operation on the prepuce or foreskin of the penis, to widen a narrow non-retractile foreskin which cannot comfortably be drawn back off the head of the penis in erection because of a constriction (stenosis) which has not expanded after adolescence.

Preputioplasty is a treatment for phimosis in the alternative to circumcision and radical dorsal slit

- which is conservative, non-traumatic and less invasive and can be performed on an outpatient basis under local anaesthetic in a doctor's office and
- has the advantage of healing very quickly with little or no significant cosmetic alteration to the appearance of the penis.

== Methods of performing preputioplasty ==
Preputioplasty Fig 1. Penis with tight phimotic ring making it difficult to retract the foreskin. Fig 2. Foreskin retracted under anaesthetic with the phimotic ring or stenosis constricting the shaft of the penis and creating a "waist". Fig 3. Incision closed laterally. Fig 4. Penis with the loosened foreskin replaced over the glans.

Preputioplasty may be performed by Z-plasty, also used in reconstructive surgery to loosen constricting scar tissue following traumatic burns.

However, Y-plasty and Z-plasty require a degree of surgical sophistication that physicians in general practice may lack.

More commonly it simply consists of one or more very short longitudinal incisions which release the stenosis–the constricting ring of tissue—in the foreskin and are closed transversely: [ | ] is closed and sutured as [ — ].

In the alternative to suturing, "[h]aemostasis [has been successfully] performed [in children] with a heated probe using the flame of an alcohol lamp or with bipolar electrodiathermy."

Only one incision is shown in Figure 3; if two or more such incisions are made this will prevent a V-shaped indentation at the opening of the foreskin when the penis is not erect. If incisions are placed on the sides of the phimotic ring, the ultimate cosmetic result is better. It is also recommended that the subcutaneous tissue be undermined to ensure a better cosmetic result.

The opening of the foreskin is now normally wide enough for the foreskin to be easily retracted. The foreskin is also slightly shorter (by half the length of the longitudinal incisions which are now closed transversely) because the widening of the phimotic ring takes up some foreskin length. Studies from a large cohort in the Indian Subcontinent show a good acceptance and an interest for foreskin preservation when there is no religious indication to remove the foreskin.
