= Phimosis =

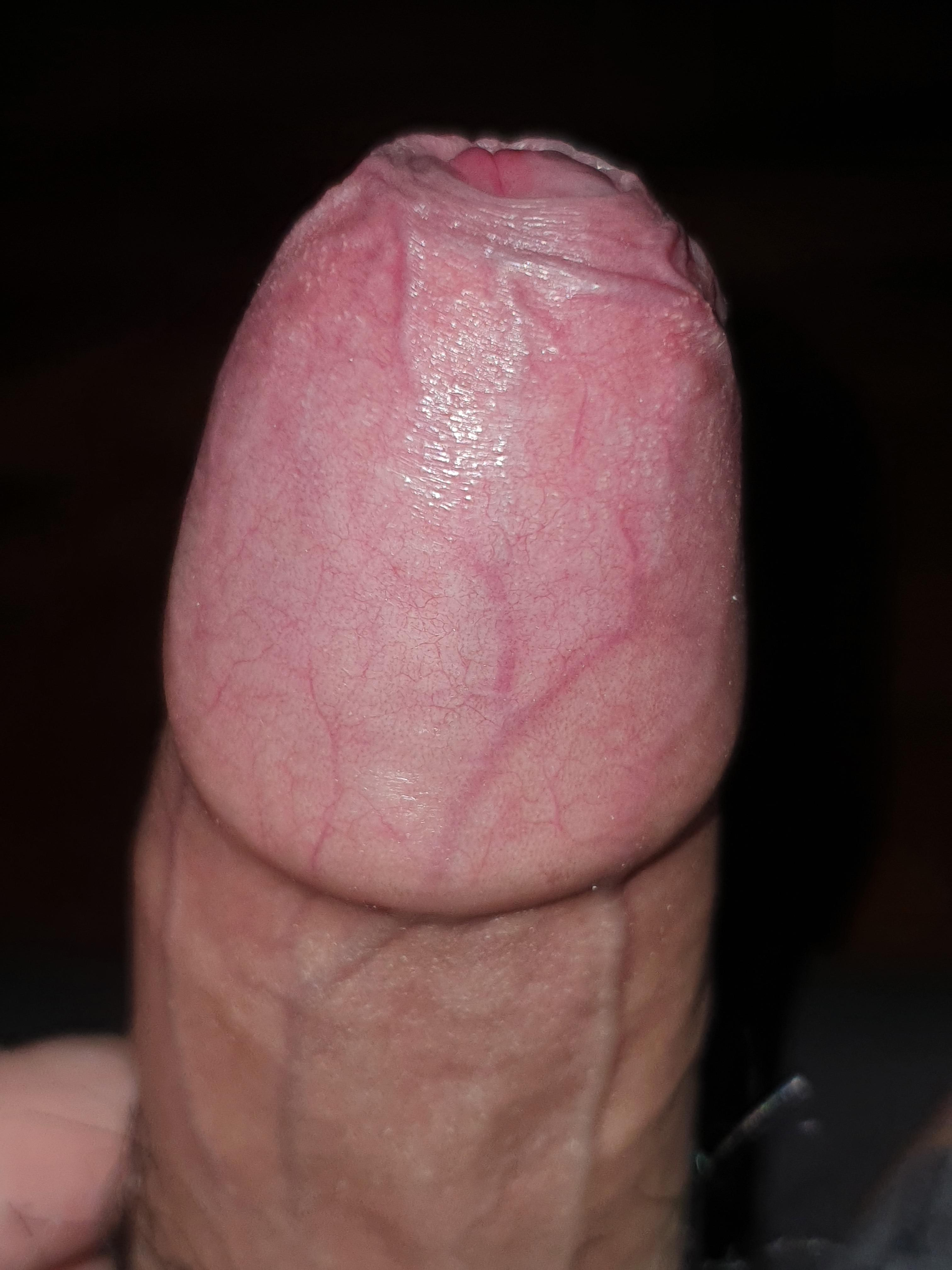
- Pronunciation: /fɪˈmoʊsɪs/ or /faɪˈmoʊsɪs/
- Specialty: Urology
- Symptoms: Unable to pull the foreskin back past the glans
- Complications: Balanitis, penile cancer, urinary retention
- Usual onset: Normal at birth
- Duration: Typically resolves by 18 years old
- Causes: Normal, balanitis, balanitis xerotica obliterans
- Risk factors: Diaper rash, poor cleaning, diabetes
- Differential diagnosis: Hair tourniquet, lymphedema of the penis
- Treatment: Steroid cream, stretching exercises, preputioplasty circumcision
- Frequency: 1%–2% (in uncircumcised males 18 years or older)

Phimosis is a penile condition characterized by restricted foreskin retractability, such that the foreskin cannot be stretched sufficiently to permit retraction beyond the glans during an erection. A balloon-like swelling under the foreskin may occur with urination. In teenagers and adults, it may result in pain during an erection, but is otherwise not painful. Those affected are at greater risk of inflammation of the glans, known as balanitis, and other complications.

For a newborn, phimosis is considered normal. At birth, the foreskin is naturally adhered to the glans, and cannot be retracted. As the child ages, in most cases, the foreskin will naturally separate. In young boys, it is normal not to be able to pull back the foreskin at all. Over 90% of cases resolve by the age of seven, although full retraction is still prevented by balanopreputial adhesions in over half at this age. Occasionally, phimosis may be caused by an underlying condition such as scarring due to balanitis or balanitis xerotica obliterans. This can typically be diagnosed by seeing scarring of the opening of the foreskin.

Generally, treatment is not considered necessary unless the foreskin still cannot be retracted by the age of 18. Efforts to pull back the foreskin during the early years of a young male's life should not be attempted. For those in whom the condition does not improve further, time can be given or a steroid cream may be used to attempt to loosen the tight skin. If this method, combined with stretching exercises, is not effective, then surgical treatments such as preputioplasty or circumcision may be recommended. A potential complication of phimosis is paraphimosis, where the tight foreskin becomes trapped behind the glans. The name for the condition comes from the Greek φίμωσις phimōsis meaning 'muzzling'.

== Signs and symptoms ==
At birth, the inner layer of the foreskin is sealed to the glans penis. The foreskin is usually non-retractable in early childhood, and some males may reach the age of 18 before their foreskin can be fully retracted.

Medical associations advise not to retract the foreskin of an infant, in order to prevent scarring. Some argue that non-retractability may "be considered normal for males up to and including adolescence." Hill states that full retractability of the foreskin may not be achieved until late childhood or early adulthood. A Danish survey found that the mean age of first foreskin retraction is 10.4 years.

Rickwood, as well as other authors, has suggested that true phimosis is over-diagnosed due to failure to distinguish between normal developmental non-retractability and a pathological condition. Some authors use the terms "physiologic" and "pathologic" to distinguish between these types of phimosis; others use the term "non-retractile foreskin" to distinguish this developmental condition from pathologic phimosis.

In some cases, a cause may not be clear, or it may be difficult to distinguish physiological phimosis from pathological phimosis if an infant appears to have discomfort while urinating or demonstrates obvious ballooning of the foreskin. However, ballooning does not indicate urinary obstruction.

In women, a comparable condition is known as "clitoral phimosis", whereby the clitoral hood cannot be retracted, limiting exposure of the glans clitoridis.

=== Severity ===
The Kikiros classification grades phimosis severity in adults by the maximum comfortable manual retraction

- Score 0: full retraction, not tight behind glans, or easy retraction limited only by congenital adhesions to the glans.
- Score 1: full retraction of foreskin, tight behind the glans.
- Score 2: partial exposure of glans, prepuce (not congenital adhesions) limiting factor.
- Score 3: partial retraction, meatus just visible.
- Score 4: slight retraction, but some distance between tip and glans, i.e. neither meatus nor glans can be exposed.
- Score 5: absolutely no retraction of the foreskin.

== Cause ==
There are three mechanical conditions that prevent foreskin retraction:

- The tip of the foreskin is too narrow to pass over the glans penis. This is normal in children and adolescents.
- The inner surface of the foreskin is fused with the glans penis. This is normal in children and adolescents but abnormal in adults.
- The frenulum is too short to allow complete retraction of the foreskin (a condition called frenulum breve).

Pathological phimosis (as opposed to the natural non-retractability of the foreskin in childhood) is rare, and the causes are varied. Some cases may arise from balanitis (inflammation of the glans penis).

Lichen sclerosus et atrophicus (thought to be the same condition as balanitis xerotica obliterans) is regarded as a common (or even the main) cause of pathological phimosis. This is a skin condition of unknown origin that causes a whitish ring of indurated tissue (a cicatrix) to form near the tip of the prepuce. This inelastic tissue prevents retraction.

Phimosis may occur after other types of chronic inflammation (such as balanoposthitis), repeated catheterization, or forcible foreskin retraction.

Phimosis may also arise in untreated diabetics due to the presence of glucose in their urine giving rise to infection in the foreskin.

One report by specialist Michel Beaugé noted that unusual masturbation practices, such as thrusting against the bed or rubbing the foreskin forward, may cause phimosis. Patients are advised to stop exacerbating masturbation techniques and are encouraged to masturbate by moving the foreskin up and down so as to mimic more closely the action of sexual intercourse. After giving this advice Beaugé noted not once did he have to recommend circumcision.

Phimosis in older boys and adult males can vary in severity, with some able to retract their foreskin partially (relative phimosis), while others are completely unable to retract their foreskin, even when the penis is in a flaccid state (full phimosis).

== Treatment ==
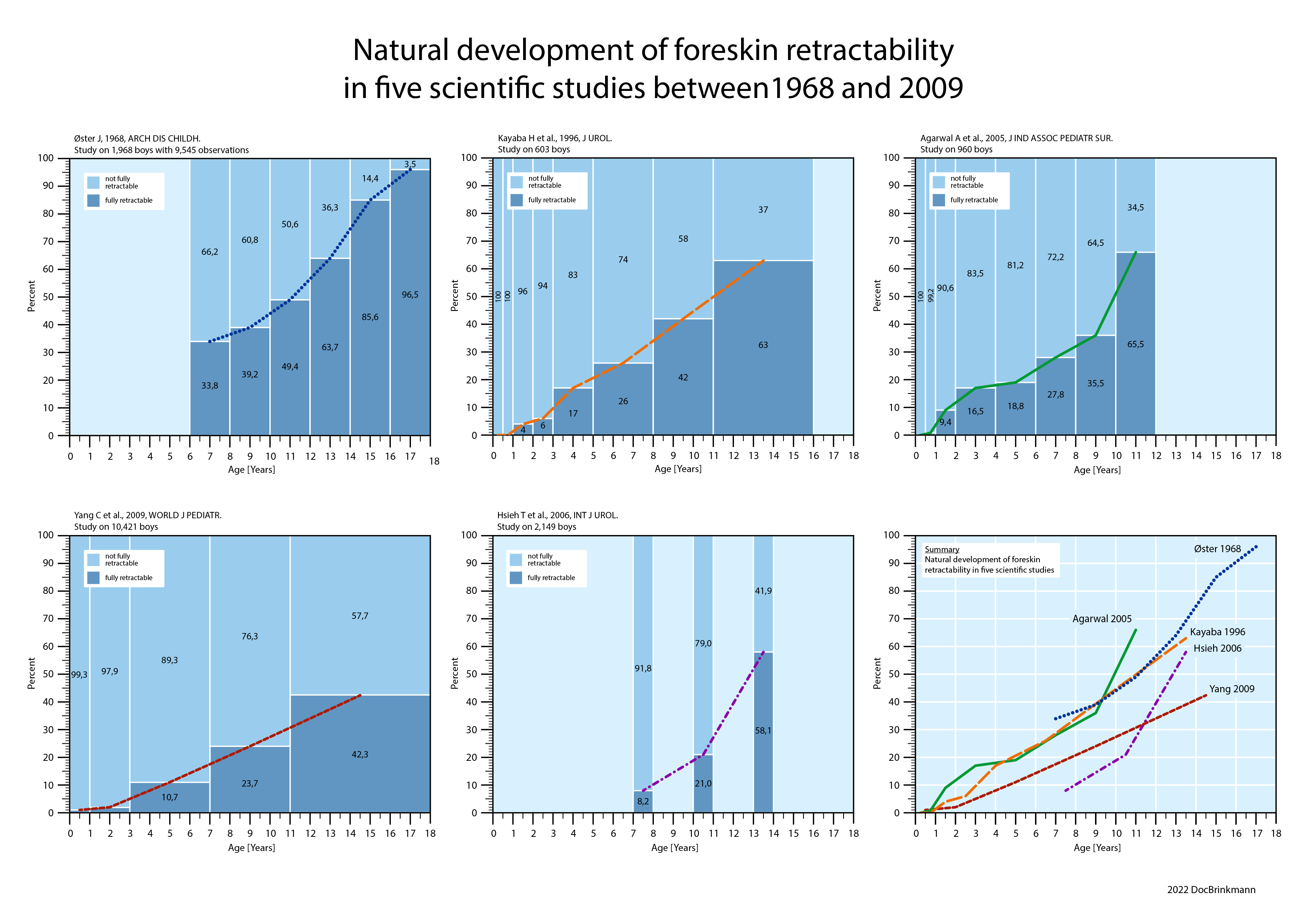
Studies on the natural development of foreskin retractability

Physiologic phimosis, common in males 10 years of age and younger, is normal, and does not require intervention. Non-retractile foreskin usually becomes retractable during the course of puberty.

If phimosis in older boys or adult males is not causing acute and severe problems, nonsurgical measures may be effective. Choice of treatment is often determined by whether circumcision is viewed as an option of last resort or as the preferred course.

=== Nonsurgical ===
- When masturbating, individuals are encouraged to closely mimick the action of sexual intercourse with an up and down motion that retracts and unretracts foreskin.
- Topical steroid creams such as betamethasone, mometasone furoate and cortisone are effective in treating phimosis and should be considered before circumcision. It is theorized that the steroids work by reducing the body's inflammatory and immune responses, and also by thinning the skin.
- Gently stretching of the foreskin can be accomplished manually. Skin that is under tension expands by growing additional cells in a process known as tissue expansion. There are different ways to stretch the phimosis. If the opening of the foreskin is already large enough, the foreskin is rolled over two fingers and these are carefully pulled apart. If the opening is still too small, then specialised foreskin tissue expander balloons and possibly flesh tunnels can be used, however these were not designed for the foreskin, rather they are used to stretch the ear lobe. The balloon is easily guided under the foreskin for all grades of phimosis and for all shapes of glans and foreskin combinations. The balloon is made of a very high grade FDA approved medical silicone that prevents micro abrasions and also stays in place due to the unique properties of the balloon. The balloon can be worn for 30 minutes each day whilst undertaking normal activities. Flesh tunnels have only been shown to be mildy effective for lower grades of phimosis and were not designed specifically to treat phimosis. Cheaper grades of flesh tunnels can cause microabrasions and many sizes are required. These are inserted into the foreskin opening and should preferably be made of silicone so that they can be folded when inserted and so that they do not interfere when worn. The diameter is gradually increased until the foreskin can be retracted without difficulty. Even phimosis with a diameter of less than a millimetre can be stretched with these rings. Rings in different sizes are also available as stretching sets. Studies involving treating phimosis using topical steroids in conjunction with stretching exercises have reported success rates of up to 96%. However, other sources claim "wildly variable reported failure rates (5 – 33 %) and lack of follow-up to adulthood."
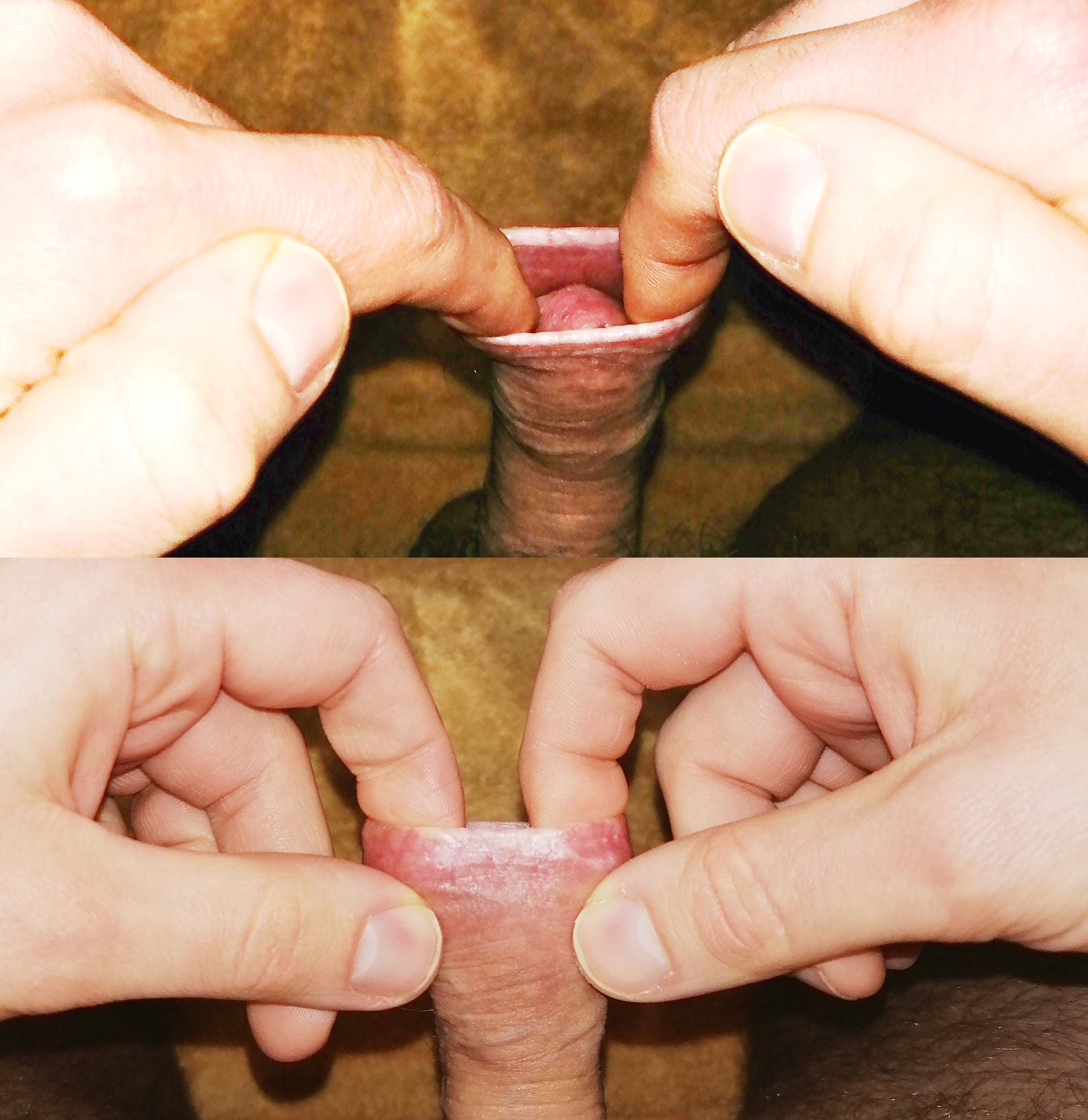
Stretching the foreskin opening with two fingers

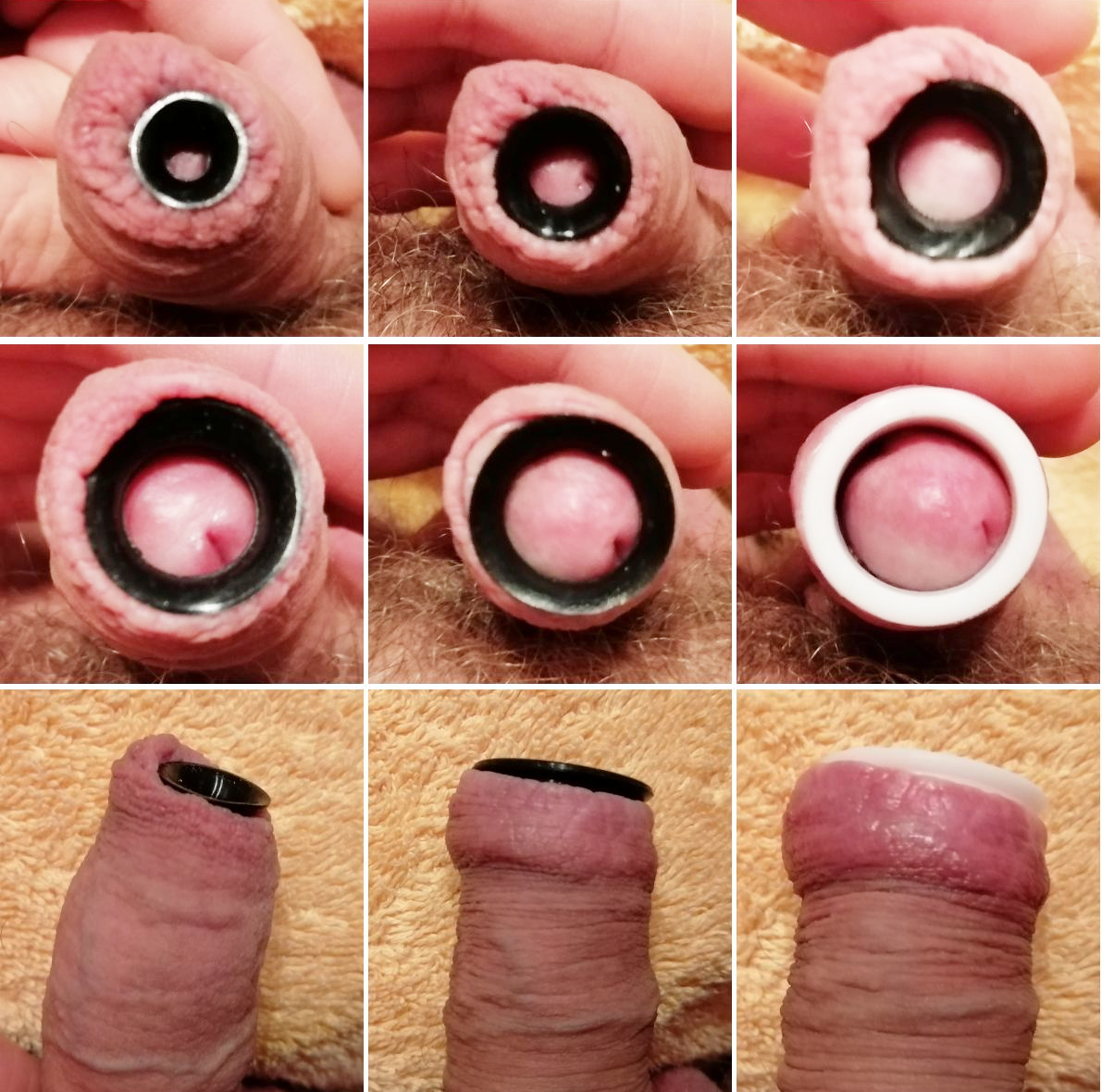
Stretching the foreskin opening with flesh tunnel of different diameters

=== Surgical ===
Preputioplasty: Fig 1. Penis with tight phimotic ring making it difficult to retract the foreskin. Fig 2. Foreskin retracted under anaesthetic with the phimotic ring or stenosis constricting the shaft of the penis and creating a "waist". Fig 3. Incision closed laterally. Fig 4. Penis with the loosened foreskin replaced over the glans.

Surgical methods range from the complete removal of the foreskin to more minor operations to relieve foreskin tightness:

- Dorsal slit (superincision) is a single incision along the upper length of the foreskin from the tip to the corona, exposing the glans without removing any tissue.
- Ventral slit (subincision) is an incision along the lower length of the foreskin from the tip of the frenulum to the base of the glans, removing the frenulum in the process. Often used when frenulum breve occurs alongside the phimosis.
- Preputioplasty, in which a limited dorsal slit with transverse closure is made along the constricting band of skin, can be an effective alternative to circumcision. It has the advantage of only limited pain and a short healing duration relative to circumcision, while also avoiding cosmetic effects.
- Circumcision is sometimes performed for phimosis, and is an effective treatment; however, this method has become less common as of 2012.

While circumcision prevents phimosis, studies of the incidence of healthy infants circumcised for each prevented case of phimosis are inconsistent.

== Prognosis ==
The most acute complication is paraphimosis. In this condition, the glans is swollen and painful, and the foreskin is immobilized by the swelling in a partially retracted position. The proximal penis is flaccid. Some studies found phimosis to be a risk factor for urinary retention and carcinoma of the penis.

== Epidemiology ==
A number of medical reports on the incidence of phimosis have been published over the years. These reports vary widely due to challenges in distinguishing physiological phimosis (developmental non-retractility) from pathological phimosis, definitional differences, ascertainment issues, and various additional factors influencing post-neonatal circumcision rates in cultures where most newborn males are circumcised. A commonly cited statistic for the incidence of pathological phimosis is 1% among uncircumcised males. When phimosis is simply equated with nonretractility of the foreskin after age 3 years, considerably higher incidence rates have been reported. Others have described incidences in adolescents and adults as high as 50%, though it is likely that many cases of physiological phimosis or partial nonretractility were included.

== History ==
According to some accounts, phimosis prevented King Louis XVI of France from impregnating his wife, Marie Antoinette, for the first seven years of their marriage, but this theory was later discredited. She was 14 and he was 15 when they married in 1770. However, the presence and nature of his genital anomaly is not considered certain, and some scholars (such as Vincent Cronin and Simone Bertiere) assert that surgical repair would have been mentioned in the records of his medical treatments if this had indeed occurred. Non-retractile prepuce in adolescence is normal, common, and usually resolves with increasing maturity.

US president James A. Garfield was assassinated by Charles J. Guiteau in 1881. Guiteau's autopsy report indicated that he had phimosis. At the time, this led to the speculation that Guiteau's murderous behavior was due to phimosis-induced insanity.
