= National Videotex Network =

National Videotex Network (NVN) was an online service launched in 1992 by U.S. Videotel. The service was meant to compete with similar text-based online services such as CompuServe, Delphi and GEnie.

Following its competitors' business model, NVN offered basic and premium services that included national and global news and weather, research libraries and databases, online forums, and games including Island of Kesmai and MUD II.

NVN was hoping to attract customers by offering Internet access and relatively low rates for access through packet switching networks.

The service was abruptly terminated on June 17, 1994. At the time of its termination, NVN programmers were working on a graphical front end for the service.
