= Nventa Biopharmaceuticals Corporation =

Canadian healthcare company

Nventa Biopharmaceuticals
- Type: Public
- Traded as: TSX: NVN
- Industry: Biotechnology
- Founded: 1990 (as Stressgen Biotechnologies)
- Defunct: 2009
- Fate: Merged
- Successor: Akela Pharma, Inc
- Headquarters: San Diego, California, United States,
- Key people: Gregory M. McKee
- Number of employees: 5
- Website: www.nventacorp.com

Nventa Biopharmaceuticals Corporation was a Canadian-incorporated biopharmaceutical company headquartered in San Diego, California developing therapeutics for the treatment of viral infections and cancer, focusing on diseases caused by human papillomavirus (HPV). Nventa is currently the only company applying heat shock protein (Hsp) technology to target the over 20 million Americans already infected with HPV. Previously headquartered in Victoria, British Columbia, Canada, the company’s common stock traded on the Toronto Stock Exchange under the symbol: NVN.

== Development programs ==
The company’s lead candidate, HspE7, is a novel therapeutic vaccine intended for the treatment of HPV-related diseases. HspE7 is derived from Nventa’s patented CoVal fusion platform that uses recombinant DNA technology to covalently fuse heat shock proteins to target antigens, thereby stimulating cellular immune system responses to specific diseases. Nventa is developing HspE7 in combination with the Toll-like receptor 3 (TLR3) agonist adjuvant Poly-ICLC for multiple indications, including Cervical Intraepithelial Neoplasia (also known as cervical dysplasia or CIN), genital warts, cervical cancer, and head and neck cancers.

According to the annual information form, for the year ending December 31, 2009, provided on Akela Pharma's website, scientific research funding has ceased for HspE7.

Nventa is also developing two additional therapeutic vaccine programs based on its CoVal technology—a Hsp – HBV (hepatitis B) fusion, and prototypes of Hsp fusion proteins with influenza antigens.

In June 2008, Nventa announced the development of a proprietary vaccine adjuvant, Poly IC – Poly Arginine (Poly-ICR), for use with both therapeutic and prophylactic vaccines. Poly-ICR is a TLR3 agonist that, when combined with a disease-specific antigen, can induce both cytotoxic (T cell) and antibody (B cell) immune responses against that antigen. As yet unpublished pre-clinical data indicate that Poly-ICR, in combination with a tumor-associated antigen, increases antigen-specific CD8 T-cell levels, while both inducing regression of tumors and preventing tumor growth in mouse models. The company developed Poly-ICR for both internal use and for external licensing opportunities.

== Clinical progress ==
Nventa originally advanced HspE7 as a single-agent therapy into multiple Phase 2 clinical trials with positive results, including trials in cervical dysplasia and recurrent respiratory papillomatosis (RRP). These trials were initiated prior to the discovery that potency could be greatly enhanced by addition of a vaccine adjuvant. Nventa is currently developing HspE7 combined with the TH1-directed adjuvant Poly-ICLC. A Phase 1b study is complete, assessing safety and tolerability in 17 patients with CIN.

== Senior management ==
Gregory M. McKee, President and Chief Executive Officer

Peter Emtage, Ph.D., Vice President, Research and Development

== Merger with Akela Pharma, Inc. ==
On March 27, 2008, Akela Pharma Inc. and Nventa Biopharmaceuticals Corporation announced the execution of an arrangement agreement to combine the two companies by way of a plan of arrangement under the Business Corporations Act.

The transaction will be effected by an exchange of Akela common shares for the outstanding shares of Nventa on the basis of 0.0355 Akela shares for each Nventa share, resulting in about 70/30 ownership split between Akela and Nventa shareholders, respectively, in the combined entity.

The public company will retain Akela's name, will operate under Akela's management, and will continue to be listed on the Toronto Stock Exchange under the ticker symbol AKL.

Nventa noted that it would have the right to nominate two directors to the board of directors of Akela.

On May 22, 2009, Akela and Nventa announced the closing of the arrangement agreement to combine the two companies and that the transaction has been approved by the shareholders of Nventa, the British Columbia Supreme Court and the Toronto Stock Exchange.
