= Tuli (rite) =

Philippine ritual male circumcision

Tuli, also known as pukpok and pagtatak, is a Filipino rite involving cutting or removal of the foreskin (circumcision). It has a long historical tradition and is considered an obligatory rite of passage for males.

While today, tuli has become synonymous with circumcision, historically, before the advent of Islam, it involved only cutting the foreskin, a practice known as superincision or dorsal slit, similar to what is traditionally practiced by Pacific Islanders.

Circumcision is not considered a religious rite in the Philippines, as some four-fifths of Filipinos profess Roman Catholicism, which strongly discourages the practice. Rather, circumcision is a social norm rooted in tradition that is followed by society at large. Most boys usually undergo the procedure not shortly after birth but prior to reaching puberty or before high school (around ages 10–14). Peer pressure is a factor in the high rate, those who have not undergone the ritual are sometimes ridiculed and labeled supót which means "pouch" by their peers.

There exists two common ways of undergoing tuli: either the traditional way by a local circumciser, called an albularyo, a depukpok, or lukaw or having it done by medical practitioners in a hospital or clinical setting.

== History ==
Tuli and circumcision are not performed for religious reasons in the Philippines, where Catholicism, which condemns medically unnecessary circumcision, is the predominant religion.

Tuli is pre-colonial and is part of the prehistoric broader practice of supercision among the Austronesian peoples that originate around 4,000 years ago among the ancestors of the Malayo-Polynesian-speakers. It is also still practiced among other Austronesian groups throughout Island Southeast Asia, Oceania, and Madagascar, though they have been secondarily lost among some groups (particularly in Oceania) or replaced with circumcision.

True circumcision was adopted in Island Southeast Asia at a much later date, around 1500 years ago, with the arrival of Islam in Southeast Asia (which views circumcision as mandatory for males). Among Muslims in Island Southeast Asia, supercision became regarded as a variation of circumcision, and the terms for the two became synonymous in local languages. As a result, early historians often wrongly assume that supercision was introduced by Islam.

In the Philippines, Islam was introduced in the 14th century, much later than other parts of Island Southeast Asia. During the Spanish colonial period of the Philippines, the Vocabulario de la Lengua Tagala (1613) records that other synonyms of tuli are catan (katan in modern Filipino orthography) and sonat which were from Arabic khitan and Malay sunat, respectively.

Antonio de Morga, a Spanish lawyer and high-ranking colonial official in the Philippines during the 17th century, noted in his 1609 book Sucesos de las islas Filipinas:

A few years before the Spaniards subdued the island of Luzon, certain natives of the island of Borneo began to go thither to trade, especially to the settlement of Manila and Tondo; and the inhabitants of the one island intermarried with those of the other. These Borneans are Mahometans, and were already introducing their religion among the natives of Luzon, and were giving them instructions, ceremonies, and the form of observing their religion, by means of certain gazizes whom they brought with them. Already a considerable number, and those the chiefest men, were commencing, although by piecemeal, to become Moros, and were being circumcised and taking the names of Moros. Had the Spaniards' coming been delayed longer, that religion would have spread throughout the island, and even through the others, and it would have been difficult to extirpate it. [emphasis added]

However, in non-Muslim regions in the Visayas, circumcision was differentiated as the verb islam, with mang-islam meaning "to perform circumcision according to Muslim rites" instead of the indigenous tuli. This makes it clear that the two are distinct practices, with supercision being indigenous, and circumcision being introduced alongside Islam.

Tuli persisted throughout the Spanish and American colonial period of the Philippines. The Filipino writer and nationalist Jose Rizal added in his 1890 annotated version of Moraga's work: "This custom [circumcision] has not fallen into disuse among the Filipinos, even among the Catholics."

In a 1903 article "Circumcision and Flagellation among the Filipinos" published in the Journal of the Association of Military Surgeons, Lieutenant Charles Norton Barney, of the medical department of the U. S. Army, noted that circumcision was "a very ancient custom among the Philippine indios, and so generalized that at least seventy or eighty per cent of males in the Tagál country have undergone the operation." He also noted that those who were uncircumcised and reached the age of puberty were taunted as "supút" by children of both sexes.

== Contemporary practice ==
More affluent parents opt to have their children circumcised as neonates in hospital, but the majority prefer that their sons undergo the tradition at around 8–12 years of age. Boys of the same age group would either go to government-sponsored missions, hospitals, or to a local circumciser. Boys normally undergo the procedure during the summer break before the start of classes as to allow time for healing. The most commonly-done procedure is in actuality not a circumcision but a dorsal slit, where no foreskin is actually removed. When the foreskin is removed, it is commonly known locally as a "German cut" in reference to the introduction of the modern surgical technique by the founder of plastic and reconstructive surgery, Johann Friedrich Dieffenbach.

The Philippines Department of Health meanwhile sponsors an annual Operation Tuli project to circumcise boys; others assist and provide the service for free.

The traditional circumcision makes use of a curved piece of wood which is anchored into the ground. The protruding part of this apparatus is pointed at its end: the foreskin of the boy being circumcised is drawn over this protruding part. The circumciser rests his knife lengthwise across the boy's foreskin and then a quick blow is made with a stick, slicing the upper foreskin into two and exposing the glans. Prior to and while the procedure is being performed, the boy is told to chew guava leaves. The masticated guava leaves are applied onto the wound as a poultice and is bandaged. The boy is then to wash off in the cold waters of a nearby river. While this procedure is commonly known as a "circumcision", it is more accurately described as a superincision as no foreskin is removed during the procedure.

Newly circumcised boys usually wear housedresses or loose skirts to help in the healing and to avoid irritating the newly circumcised penis. The swelling that might occur during this period is termed pangángamatis (literally, "becoming like a tomato", kamatis) owing to the reddish appearance of the penis.

According to the World Health Organization: "In the Philippines, where circumcision is almost universal and typically occurs at age 10–14 years, a survey of boys found strong evidence of social determinants, with two thirds of boys choosing to be circumcised simply “to avoid being uncircumcised”, and 41% stating that it was “part of the tradition.”

In July 2019, researchers affiliated with the University of Melbourne and Bond University published a cohort study, Post-traumatic stress disorder (PTSD) among Filipino boys subjected to non-therapeutic ritual or medical surgical procedures, which investigated potential negative psychological effects of tuli and medically-assisted circumcision. They found that of the 1,500 children, aged 11 to 16, who participated in the study, nearly three-fourths met the criteria for post-traumatic stress disorder (PTSD).

In August 2022, it was reported an 11-year-old boy from Davao Oriental had died from tetanus after undergoing circumcision at a local medical center.

In May 2025, it was reported a 10-year-old boy from Tondo, Manila died from a stroke that officials attributed to an overdose of anesthesia. The owner of the clinic where the surgery was performed, a licensed midwife, was charged with reckless imprudence resulting in homicide.
