= Circumcision controversies =

Male circumcision has been a subject of controversy for a number of reasons including religious, ethical, sexual, legal and medical.

During the late 19th and early 20th centuries, in a rapidly changing medical and surgical world, circumcision rose in popularity as a means of prophylaxis in the Anglosphere. Its primary justification was to promote cleanliness, as well as reducing and preventing the incidence of disease. Many medical professionals and advocates of the procedure also believed that it would reduce pleasure and the urge to masturbate, which was considered a social ill of the era, although their belief is considered false in modern times.

Circumcision proponents say that circumcision reduces the risks of a range of infections and diseases and confers sexual benefits. By contrast, the majority of modern opponents, particularly of routine neonatal circumcision, question its preventive efficacy and object to subjecting non-consenting newborn males to a procedure that is potentially harmful with little to no benefit, as well as violating their human rights and possibly negatively impacting their sex life.

In Classical and Hellenistic civilization, Ancient Greeks and Romans posed great value on the beauty of nature, physical integrity, aesthetics, harmonious bodies and nudity, including the foreskin (see also Ancient Greek art), and were opposed to circumcision, an opposition inherited by the canon and secular legal systems of the Christian West and East that lasted at least through to the Middle Ages, according to Frederick Hodges.

Judaism, Islam, Coptic Christianity, and the Eritrean Orthodox Church still advocate male circumcision as a religious obligation. It is common in the Ethiopian Orthodox Church as a cultural practice despite the liturgy recommending against it.

== Religious and cultural conflicts ==
=== Ancient Levant ===
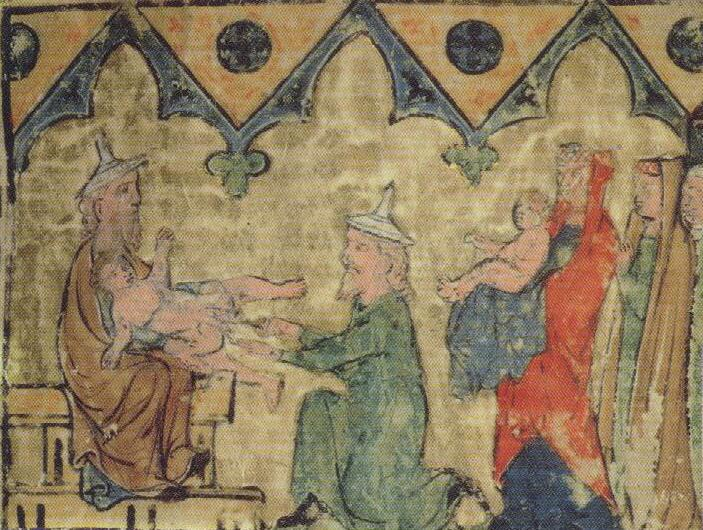
Circumcision of Abraham's son Isaac. Regensburg Pentateuch, Israel Museum, Jerusalem (c. 1300).

The Book of Genesis explains circumcision as a covenant with God given to Abraham, In Judaism it "symbolizes the promise of lineage and fruitfulness of a great nation," the "seal of ownership and the guarantee of relationship between peoples and their god." Some scholars look elsewhere for the origin of Jewish circumcision. One explanation, dating from Herodotus, is that the custom was acquired from the Egyptians, possibly during the period of enslavement. An additional hypothesis, based on linguistic/ethnographic work begun in the 19th century, suggests circumcision was a common tribal custom among Semitic-speaking peoples (Jews, Arabs, and Phoenicians).

The Jewish and Islamic traditions both see circumcision as a way to distinguish a group from its neighbours. The Bible records "uncircumcised" being used as a derogatory reference for opponents and Jewish victory in battle that culminated in mass post-mortem circumcision, to provide an account of the number of enemy casualties. Jews were also required to circumcise all household members, including slaves – a practice that would later put them into collision with Roman and Christian law (see below).

=== Classical civilization ===
In 167 BCE Judea was part of the Seleucid Empire. Its ruler, Antiochus IV Epiphanes (175–165 BCE), smarting from a defeat in a war against Ptolemaic Egypt, banned traditional Jewish religious practices, and attempted to forcibly let the Jews accept Hellenistic culture. Throughout the country Jews were ordered, with the threat of execution, to sacrifice pigs to Greek gods (the normal practice in the Ancient Greek religion), desecrate the Shabbat, eat unkosher animals (especially pork), and relinquish their Jewish scriptures. Antiochus' decree also outlawed Jewish circumcision, and parents who violated his order were hanged along with their infants. According to Tacitus, as quoted by Hodges, Antiochus "endeavoured to abolish Jewish superstition and to introduce Greek civilization."

According to rabbinical accounts, he desecrated the Second Temple of Jerusalem by placing a statue of Olympian Zeus on the altar of the Temple; this incident is also reported by the biblical Book of Daniel, where the author refers to the statue of the Greek god inside the Temple as "abomination of desolation". Antiochus' decrees and vituperation of Judaism motivated the Maccabean Revolt; the Maccabees reacted violently against the forced Hellenization of Judea, destroyed pagan altars in the villages, circumcised boys, and forced Hellenized Jews into outlawry. The revolt ended in the re-establishment of an independent Jewish kingdom under the Hasmoneans, until it turned into a client state of the Roman Republic under the reign of Herod the Great (37–4 BCE).

Classical, Hellenistic, and Roman culture found circumcision to be cruel and repulsive. In the Roman Empire, circumcision was regarded as a barbaric and disgusting custom. The consul Titus Flavius Clemens was condemned to death by the Roman Senate in 95 CE for, according to the Talmud, circumcising himself and converting to Judaism. The Emperor Hadrian (117–138) forbade circumcision. Overall, the rite of circumcision was especially execrable in Classical civilization, also because it was the custom to spend an hour a day or so exercising nude in the gymnasium and in Roman baths, therefore Jewish men did not want to be seen in public deprived of their foreskins.

As for the anti-circumcision law passed by Hadrian, it is considered by many to be, together with his decision to build a Roman temple upon the ruins of the Second Temple and dedicate it to Jupiter, one of the main causes of the Bar Kokhba revolt (132–135 CE), which was brutally crushed; according to Cassius Dio, 580,000 Jews were killed and 50 fortified towns and 985 villages razed. He claimed that "Many Romans, moreover, perished in this war. Therefore, Hadrian, in writing to the Senate, did not employ the opening phrase commonly affected by the Emperors: 'If you and your children are in health, it is well; I and the army are in health.'" Because of the great loss of life in the war, even though Hadrian was victorious, he refused a triumph.

Hadrian's policy after the rebellion reflected an attempt to root out Judaism: he enacted a ban on circumcision, all Jews were forbidden to enter Jerusalem upon pain of death, and the city was renamed Aelia Capitolina, while Judea was renamed Syria Palaestina. Around 140, his successor Antoninus Pius (138-161 CE) exempted Jews from the decree against circumcision, allowing them to circumcise their sons, although they were forbidden to do the same on their slaves and proselytes. Jewish nationalists' (Pharisees and Zealots) response to the decrees also took a more moderate form: circumcisions were secretly performed, even on dead Jews.

However, there were also many Jews, known as "Hellenizers", who viewed Hellenization and social integration of the Jewish people in the Greco-Roman world favourably, and pursued a completely different approach: accepting the Emperor's decree and even making efforts to restore their foreskins to better assimilate into Hellenistic society. The latter approach was common during the reign of Antiochus, and again under Roman rule. The foreskin was restored by one of two methods, that were later revived in the late 20th century; both were described in detail by the Greek physician Aulus Cornelius Celsus in his comprehensive encyclopedic work De Medicina, written during the reign of Tiberius (14-37 CE). The surgical method involved freeing the skin covering the penis by dissection, and then pulling it forward over the glans; he also described a simpler surgical technique used on men whose prepuce is naturally insufficient to cover their glans. The second approach, known as "epispasm", was non-surgical: a restoration device which consisted of a special weight made of bronze, copper, or leather (sometimes called Pondus Judaeus, i.e. "Jewish burden"), was affixed to the penis, pulling its skin downward. Over time, a new foreskin was generated, or a short prepuce was lengthened, by means of tissue expansion. Martial also mentioned the instrument in Epigrammaton (Book 7:35).

The Apostle Paul referred to these practices in his letters, saying: "Was a man already circumcised when he was called? He should not become uncircumcised." But he also explicitly denounced the forcing of circumcision upon non-Jews, rejecting and condemning those Judaizers who stipulated the ritual to Gentile Christians, labelling such advocates as "false brothers" (see below). In the mid-2nd century Rabbinical Jewish leaders, due to increasing cases of foreskin restorations in Roman Empire, introduced a radical method of circumcision, the periah, that left the glans totally uncovered and sew the remaining skin. The new method became immediately the only valid circumcision procedure, to ensure that a born Jew will remain circumcised for all his life and to make mostly impossible restoring the foreskin. Operations became permanent and irreversible like today.

Under the first Christian emperor, Constantine, the two rescripts of Antoninus on circumcision were re-enacted and again in the 6th century under Justinian. These restrictions on circumcision made their way into both secular and Canon law and "at least through the Middle Ages, preserved and enhanced laws banning Hebrews from circumcising non-Hebrews and banning Christians or slaves of any religious affiliation from undergoing circumcision for any reason."

=== Christianity ===
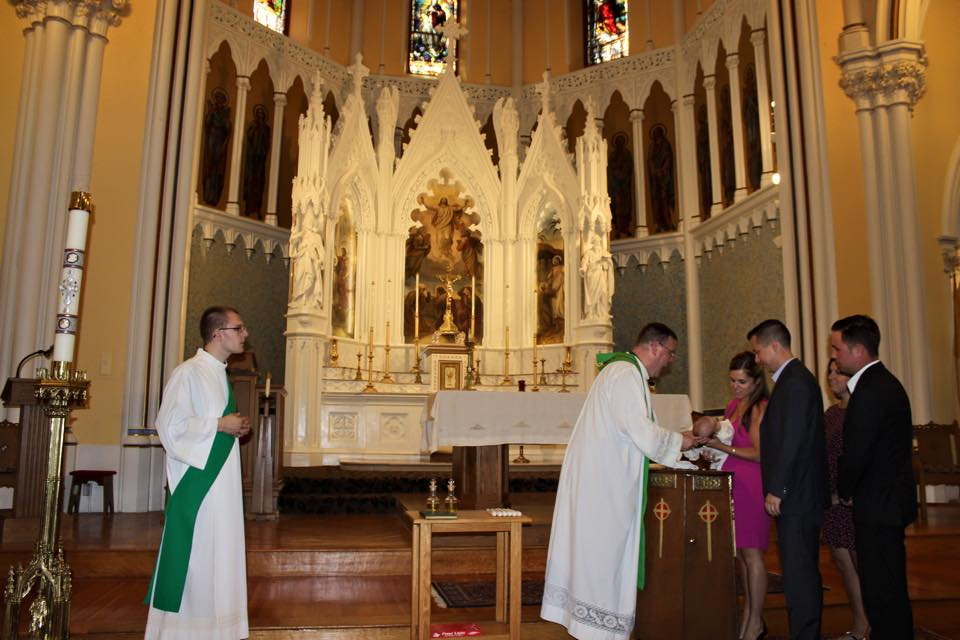
The Christian sacrament of baptism, in covenant theology, is seen as fulfilling the Israelite rite of circumcision.

Circumcision has also played a major role in Christian history and theology. While the circumcision of Jesus is celebrated as a feast day in the liturgical calendar of many Christian denominations. There was debate in the early Church on whether Gentiles needed to be circumcised in order to join the communities; some Jewish Christians insisted that it was necessary. As such, the Council of Jerusalem (50 CE) was held, which decreed that male circumcision was not a requirement for Gentiles, which became known as the "Apostolic Decree". This was one of the first acts differentiating Early Christianity from Judaism. Covenant theology largely views the Christian sacrament of baptism as fulfilling the Israelite practice of circumcision, both being signs and seals of the covenant of grace.

Today, many Christian denominations are neutral about ritual male circumcision, not requiring it for religious observance, but neither forbidding it for cultural or other reasons. Followers of some African and Eastern Christian denominations (such as the Coptic, Ethiopian, and Eritrean Orthodox Churches) commonly practice male circumcision shortly after birth as a rite of passage, despite the churches themselves not mandating or encouraging the practice.

Male circumcision is widely practiced among Christian communities in the Anglosphere countries, Africa, Oceania, the Middle East, South Korea and the Philippines. The United States and the Philippines are the largest Christian countries in the world to extensively practice male circumcision, while countries with majorities of Christian adherents in Europe and South America have low circumcision rates.

=== Islam ===
In the early 7th century, Muhammad welded together many Semitic tribes of the Arabian peninsula into the kernel of a rapidly expanding Muslim movement. Male and female circumcision were already well established among these tribes, and probably had been for more than 1,000 years, most likely as a fertility rite. Herodotus had noticed the practice among various Semite nations in the 5th century BCE, and Josephus had specifically mentioned circumcision as a tradition among Arabs in the 1st century CE. There are some narrations attributed to Muhammad in which he approves of female circumcision; many scholars believe that these narrations are weak and lack authenticity.

The practice of circumcision is sometimes characterized as a part of fitrah as mentioned in the hadith (Prophetic narrations).

=== Judaism ===
Around 140 CE, the Tannaim made circumcision requirements stricter, in order to make the procedure irreversible.

During the nineteenth and twentieth centuries many Jewish reformers, doctors, and physicians in Central and Eastern Europe proposed to replace circumcision with a symbolic ceremony, while others sought to ban or abolish circumcision entirely, as they perceived it as a dangerous, barbaric and pagan ritual of genital mutilation that could transmit infectious diseases to newborns. The first formal objection to circumcision within Judaism occurred in 1843 in Frankfurt. The Society for the Friends of Reform, a group that criticized traditional Jewish practices, said that brit milah was not a mitzvah but an outworn legacy from Israel's earlier phases, an obsolete throwback to primitive religion. With the expanding role of medicine came further opposition; certain aspects of Jewish circumcision such as periah and metzitzah (drawing the blood from the circumcision wound through sucking or a cloth) were deemed unhygienic and dangerous for the newborns. Later evidence that syphilis and tuberculosis – two of the most feared infectious diseases in the 19th century – were spread by mohels, caused various rabbis to advocate metzitzah to be done using a sponge or a tube. Among the secular, non-observant Jews who chose to not circumcise their sons there was also Theodor Herzl.

Ephron reports that non-Jews and also some Jewish reformers in early 19th-century Germany had criticized ritual circumcision as "barbaric" and that Jewish doctors responded to these criticisms with defences of the ritual or proposals for modification or reform. By the late 19th century some Jewish doctors in the country defended circumcision by saying it had health advantages. Today the Rabbinical Council of America, the largest group of Modern Orthodox rabbis, endorses using a glass tube as a substitute of metzitzah.

However, a growing number of contemporary Jews and Intactivist Jewish groups in the United States and Israel, both secular and religious, started to question overall long-term effects, psychological and psychophysical consequences of trauma caused by circumcision on Jewish children, and choose not to circumcise their sons. They are assisted by a small number of Reform, Liberal, and Reconstructionist rabbis, and have developed a welcoming ceremony that they call the Brit shalom ("Covenant [of] Peace") for such children, also accepted by Humanistic Judaism. Beyond the Bris is an online Jewish community who believe circumcising healthy children is unnecessary. Their website hosts a statement against antisemitism that has been endorsed by Intactivist groups. Bruchim is a Jewish organisation that encourages Brit shalom. Rather than attacking cirumcision, it focuses on "creating welcoming spaces" for Jews who are not circumcised and their families, as with other Jewish minorities, and putting parents and parents-to-be in touch with celebrants of Brit shalom. the book "Celebrating Brit Shalom" offers a choice of ceremonies, advice and songs.

=== Sikhism ===
Circumcision is strongly condemned in Sikhism as it is seen as a violation of the Sikh principle of respecting the body as created by God. Sikh infants are not circumcised, and the practice is criticized in Sikh.

=== Middle Ages to the 19th century ===
==== Judaism and Christianity ====
Thomas Aquinas in his Summa Theologica questioned why, if under Jewish doctrine circumcision removed original sin, Jesus was circumcised – as Jesus had no original sin. Steve Jones suggests there is a theological tradition that Jesus regained his foreskin at the Ascension. "Had he failed to do so, the Saved would themselves have to be operated upon in Paradise so as not to be more perfect than their Saviour."

Jews were expelled from England in 1290, ostensibly over social tensions concerning usury. But the public imagination had been gripped by blood libel since at least the 12th century: "So pervasive was the belief that Jews circumcised their victims ... that Menasseh ben Israil, the Dutch Rabbi who sought from Cromwell the readmission of the Jews in 1656, had to dwell at considerable length in his Vindiciae Judaeorum at refuting the claim."

In 15th-century Spain, most Jews and Muslims were expelled and the Spanish Inquisition monitored and prosecuted converts to Christianity to ensure they were not secretly practising Judaism, consorting with Jews or engaging in Jewish practices such as circumcision.

==== Mesoamerican cultures ====
In 1521, Cortés defeated the Aztec empire in Mesoamerica, which was followed by a large influx of Spanish clergy, whose writings provide most of information about pre-conquest Aztec life and customs largely assembled from interviews with those who survived the invasion and subsequent epidemics, and their descendants. Diego Durán, a Dominican friar, was convinced that the Aztecs were one of the lost tribes of Israel, with a crucial piece of supporting evidence being that they had practised circumcision. Alonso de Zuazo and Gerónimo de Mendieta also believed it, which went to influence Juan de Torquemada.

So influential was this notion that 300 years later Bancroft in his monumental Native Races began his discussion of circumcision by writing: "Whether the custom of circumcision, which has been the great prop of argument in favor of the Jewish origin of the Aztecs, really obtained among these people, has been doubted by numerous authors," concluding that it probably existed in a "certain form among some tribes" (p278). The key being "a certain form", since Bancroft makes clear in a footnote that the majority of his sources, including Clavigero, Ternaux-Compans, Carbajal Espinosa, Oviedo y Herrera, and especially Acosta, believed Durán and others "confounded the custom of drawing blood from the secret organs with circumcision", and "the incision on the prepuce and ear to have been mistaken for circumcision", adding that this blood-letting rite was "chiefly performed upon sons of great men" (p279). The case was not helped by the fact no reports of seeing a circumcised adult Aztec existed in the literature. Remondino says it is "a matter of controversy" whether the foreskin had actually been removed (p46).

In regard to the Mayans, Bancroft says that in 1858 Brasseur de Bourbourg reported finding "traces" of circumcision in the sources, despite Cogolludo having reported that "circumcision was unknown to the Indians of Yucatan" (pp279, 679). But in 1864 Brasseur published his French translation of Diego de Landa's recently recovered 1556 ethnographic manuscript, which decisively rejected the notion of Mayan circumcision, and in a footnote he acknowledged there had probably been a "mistake", an admission that never found its way into the English-language literature although modern ethnography has long since understood the nature of these rituals. However, the Aztecs and Mayans are included by many authors from other disciplines among the list of pre-modern people who practised circumcision. Examples of such sources include UNAIDS, Kaplan, and Weiss.

==== Later times ====
Countries that do not circumcise have often held antipathy for those that do. Being circumcised was often seen as a sign of disgrace. According to Darby, it was also seen as a serious loss of erogenous tissue: "During the Renaissance and 18th century the centrality of the foreskin to male sexual function and the pleasure of both partners was recognised by anatomists Berengario da Carpi, Gabriello Fallopio and William Harvey, in popular sex manuals like Aristotle's master-piece, and by physicians like John Hunter, who also appreciated the importance of the foreskin in providing the slack tissue needed to accommodate an erection."

In 1650, English physician John Bulwer in his study of body modification, Anthropometamorphosis: Man Transform'd, or the Artificial Changeling, wrote of the loss in sexual pleasure resulting from circumcision: "the part which hangeth over the end of the foreskin, is moved up and down in coition, that in this attrition it might gather more heat, and increase the pleasure of the other sexe; a contentation of which they [the circumcised] are defrauded by this injurious invention. For, the shortnesse of the prepuce is reckoned among the organical defects of the yard, … yet circumcision detracts somewhat from the delight of women, by lessening their titillation." The English historian Edward Gibbon, author of The History of the Decline and Fall of the Roman Empire, referred to the practice as "a painful and often dangerous rite", and a "singular mutilation" practiced only by Jews and Turks.

== Modern debates ==
=== Tengrism ===
Tengri Turks, a neo-paganist term for Turks who practice the ancient faith of Tengrism, categorically oppose male circumcision. Fathers who are circumcised themselves no longer have their sons circumcised, since it is not an original old Turkish tradition, but has found its way through Islam.

=== Ethics ===
The ethical view of circumcision varies by country. In the United States, which has a high circumcision rate, the American Medical Association stated in 2011 that they "will oppose any attempts to intrude into legitimate medical practice and the informed choices of patients". In 2012, the American Academy of Pediatrics and the American College of Obstetricians and Gynecologists released a joint report and a policy statement on non-therapeutic infant circumcision, stating that preventive health benefits of elective circumcision of male newborns outweigh the risks of the procedure, although the health benefits are not great enough to recommend routine circumcision for all male newborns, and that parents ultimately should decide whether circumcision is in the best interests of their male child.

After the release of the position statement, a debate appeared in the journal Pediatrics and the Journal of Medical Ethics. In 2013, a group of 38 Northern European pediatricians, doctors, surgeons, ethicists, and lawyers co-authored a comment stating that they found the AAP's technical report and policy statement suffered from cultural bias, and reached recommendations and conclusions different from those of physicians in other parts of the world; in particular, the group advocated instead a policy of no-harm towards infants and respect for their rights of bodily integrity and age of consent. Two authors stated that, in their view, the AAP's 2012 analysis was inaccurate, improper, and incomplete. The AAP received further criticism from Intactivist groups that oppose circumcision.

The American Academy of Pediatrics responded that because about half of American males are circumcised and half are not, there may be a more tolerant view concerning circumcision in the US, but that if there is any cultural bias among the AAP taskforce who wrote the Circumcision Policy statement, it is much less important than the bias Frisch et al. may hold because of clear prejudices against the practice that can be found in Europe. The AAP then explained why they reached conclusions regarding the health benefits of circumcision that are different from the ones reached by some of their European counterparts.

In 2017, the American Medical Association's Journal of Ethics published two articles challenging the morality of performing non-therapeutic infant circumcision.

=== History ===
Circumcision spread in several English-speaking nations from the late 19th century, with the introduction of anesthesia and antisepsis rapidly expanding surgical practice. Doctors such as Sir Jonathan Hutchinson in England wrote articles in favour of the procedure on medical and social grounds, popularizing it in his home country, as well as the Anglosphere. Peter Charles Remondino, a San Diego physician, wrote History of Circumcision from the Earliest Times to the Present: Moral and Physical Reasons for Its Performance (1891), to promote circumcision. Lewis Sayre, a prominent orthopedic surgeon at the time, was another early American advocate and is generally credited with popularizing the procedure in the United States. However, the theories on which many early claims were made, such as the reflex theory of disease and the alleged harmful effects of masturbation, have long since been abandoned by the medical profession.

An early British opponent of circumcision was Herbert Snow, who wrote a short book called The barbarity of circumcision as a remedy for congenital abnormality in 1890. But as late as 1936, L. E. Holt, an author of pediatric textbooks, advocated male and female circumcision as a treatment for masturbation. The first serious questioning of the practice did not occur until late 1949, when the Scottish neonatologist and pediatrician Douglas Gairdner published The Fate of the Foreskin in the British Medical Journal; according to Wallerstein, this began to significantly affect the practice of circumcision in the United Kingdom.

According to Darby and Cox, the persistence of circumcision in the US has led to more vigorous protest movements. A 1980 protest march at the California State Capitol was reported in an Associated Press article. The National Organization of Circumcision Information Resource Centers (NOCIRC) was formed by Marilyn Milos, R.N., in 1985. The organization's stated objective is to secure the birthright of male, female, and intersex children and babies to keep their sex organs intact. Protest rallies have been held in the US and other areas. NOCIRC have consistently criticised the American medical community's circumcision guidelines. According to Milos and Donna Macris, "The need to defend the baby's right to a peaceful beginning was brought to light by Dr. Frédérick Leboyer in his work, Birth Without Violence".

This period also saw the formation of anti-circumcision organizations in Australia, Canada, the United Kingdom and South Africa. Activists began creating websites in the mid-1990s, and this process has continued. One such organization distributed questionnaires to men who felt harmed by their circumcisions. The complaints included prominent scarring (33%), insufficient penile skin for comfortable erection (27%), erectile curvature from uneven skin loss (16%), and pain and bleeding upon erection/manipulation (17%). Psychological complaints included feelings of mutilation (60%), low self-esteem/inferiority to intact men (50%), genital dysmorphia (55%), rage (52%), resentment/depression (59%), violation (46%), or parental betrayal (30%). Many respondents reported that their physical/emotional suffering impeded emotional intimacy with their partner(s), resulting in sexual dysfunction. Prominent men known to be unhappy about being circumcised include Sigmund Freud, A. E. Housman, W. H. Auden, Geoffrey Keynes and his brother John Maynard Keynes, the economist. In 1996 the British Medical Journal published a letter by 20 men saying that "we have been harmed by circumcision in childhood"; they argued that "it cannot be ethical for a doctor to amputate normal tissue from a normal child". Dr. Benjamin Spock (1903 – 1998), whose Baby and Child Care is the biggest selling American single-author book in history, originally supported circumcision but changed his mind near the end of his life.

=== Medical controversies ===
==== United States medical view ====
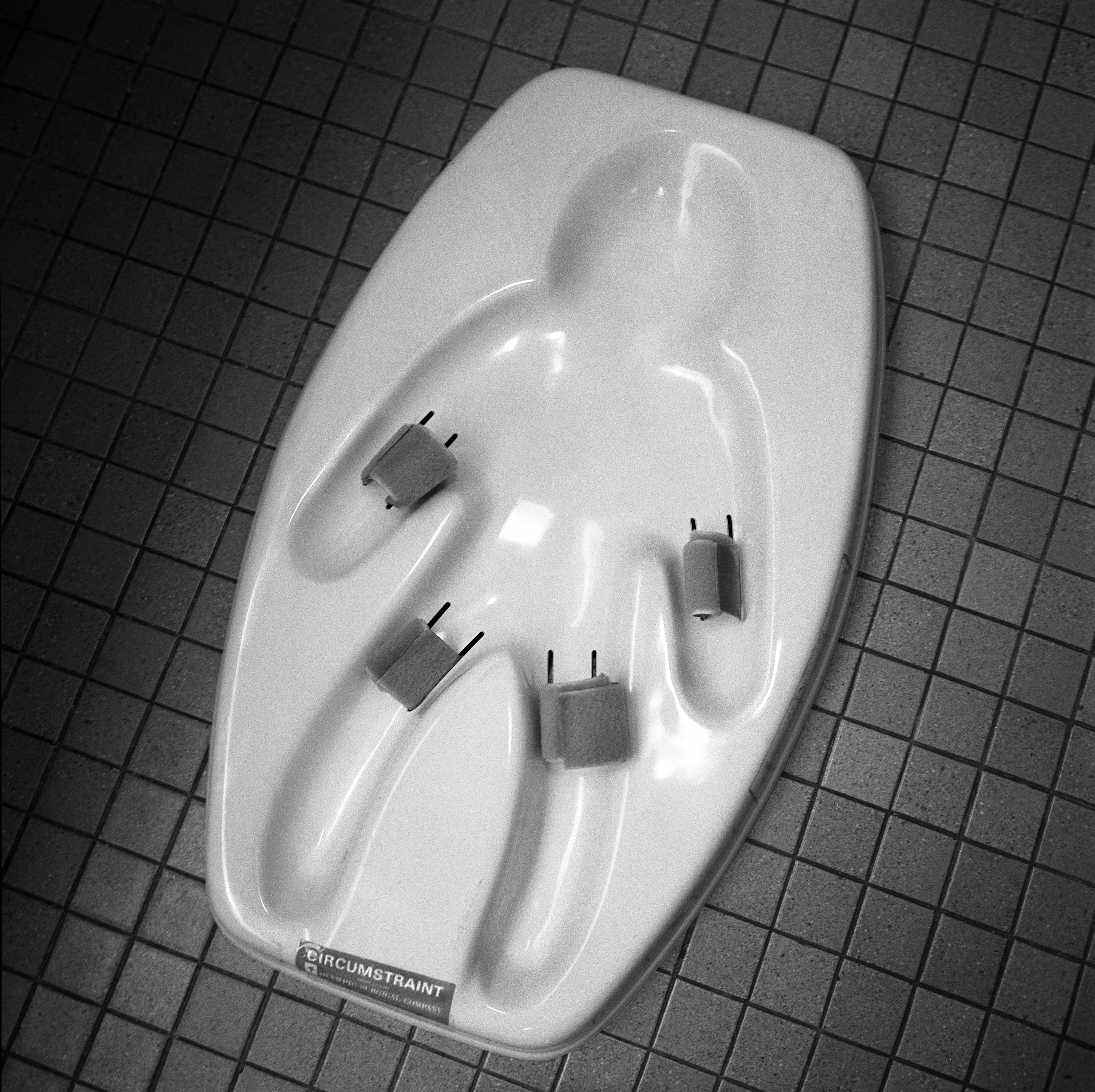
A restraining device used to immobilize infants during circumcision

In the United States, the American Academy of Pediatrics (AAP), the American Academy of Family Physicians (AAFP), and the American College of Obstetricians and Gynecologists (ACOG), which collaborated to produce the 2012 statements issued by the AAP, position paper as of 2012 stated:

In cases such as the decision to perform a circumcision in the newborn period (where there is reasonable disagreement about the balance between medical benefits and harms, where there are nonmedical benefits and harms that can result from a decision on whether to perform the procedure, and where the procedure is not essential to the child's immediate well-being), the parents should determine what is in the best interest of the child. In the pluralistic society of the United States, where parents are afforded wide authority for determining what constitutes appropriate child-rearing and child welfare, it is legitimate for the parents to take into account their own cultural, religious, and ethnic traditions, in addition to medical factors, when making this choice.

In 2025, through their HealthyChildren website, the AAP wrote "While circumcision is not routinely recommended for all male newborns, there may be cultural, religious, medical, and other reasons you may decide that it is right for your child." The article recommends parents weigh the risks and benefits, discussing them with each other as well as their pediatrician or obstetrician. The article also states "...circumcision is not necessary to have a healthy child. However, research shows that the medical benefits at least balance and may outweigh the risks."

=== Bodily autonomy ===
There are ongoing debates regarding the ethics of male circumcision in relation to bodily autonomy.

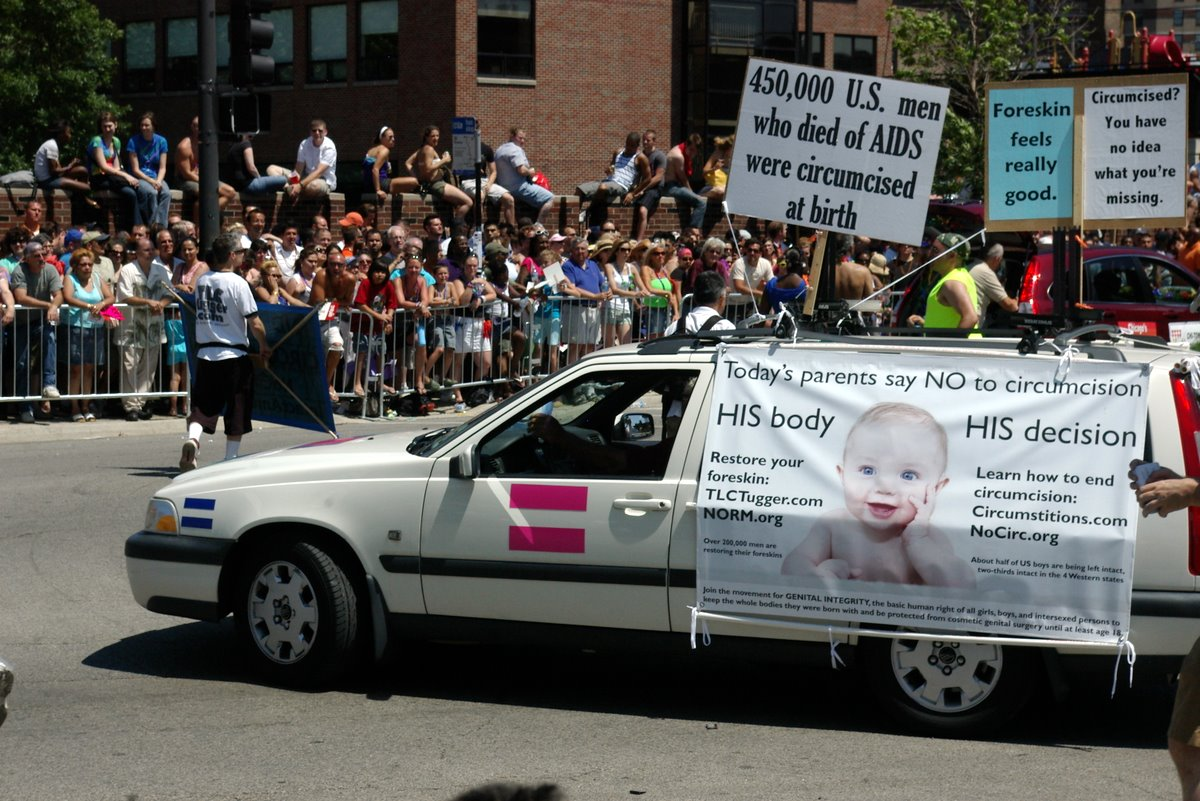
A lobby against infant circumcision on Chicago's Pride Parade

T Hammond (1999) is of the view that every person has a right to a whole intact body and that, where minors are concerned, "the unnecessary removal of a functioning body organ in the name of tradition, custom or any other non-disease related cause should never be acceptable to the health profession." He argues that such interventions are violations of individual bodily rights, and "a breach of fundamental medical ethics principles". Opponents of circumcision, who call themselves "Intactivists" see non-therapeutic infant circumcision as unnecessary, harmful, and unethical. Some want the procedures prohibited.

Others also see the genital cutting of children as a human rights and children's rights issue, opposing the genital modification and mutilation of children, including circumcision, female genital mutilation (FGM), and intersex genital surgeries; a number of anti-circumcision organizations oppose sex assignment surgeries on infants with ambiguous genitalia.

Current laws in many countries, and both United States federal law as well as laws in several U.S. states, prohibit the genital modification and mutilation of female minors, with some exceptions based on medical need. Opponents of male circumcision assert that laws against genital modification and mutilation of minors should apply equally to males and females.

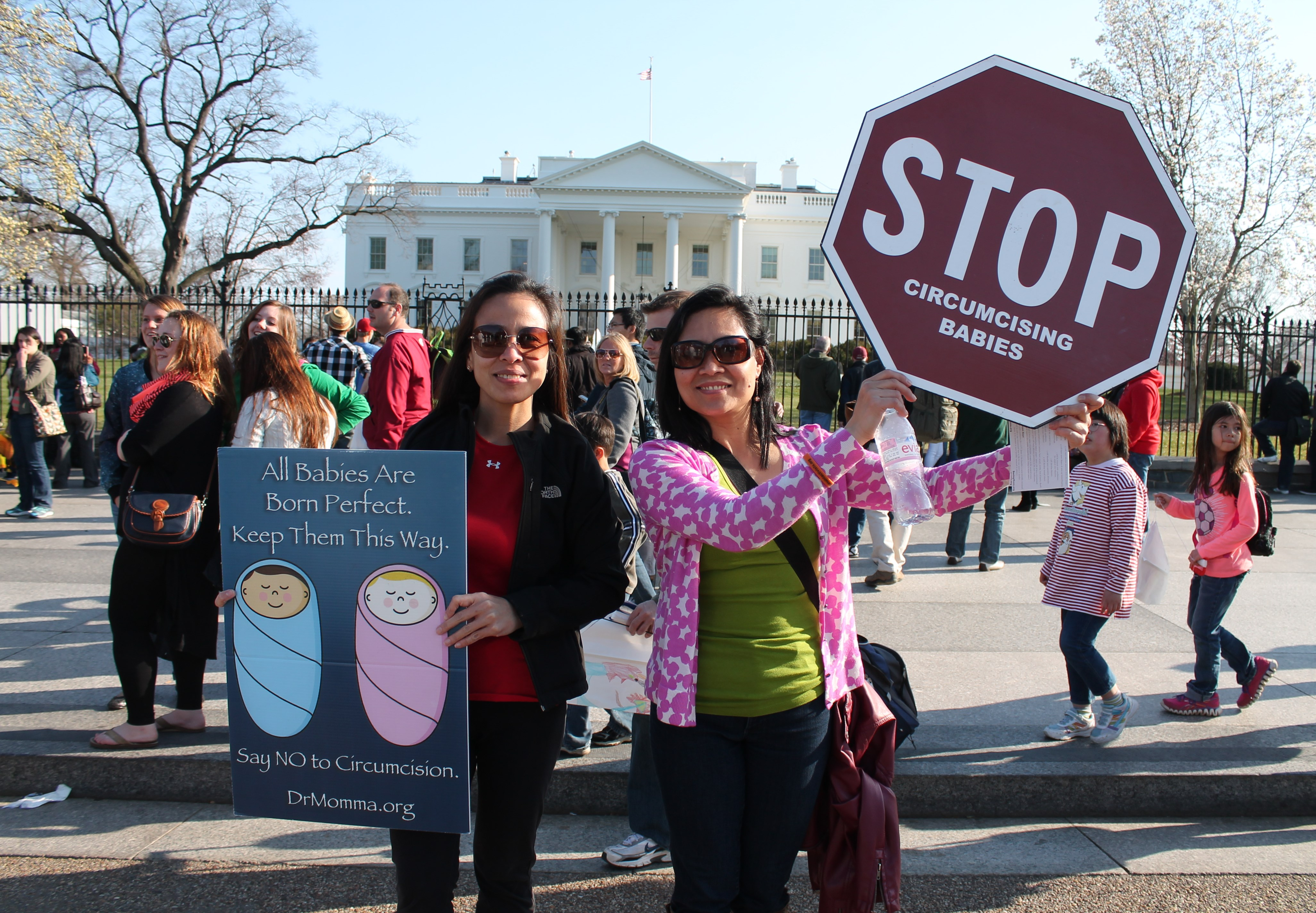
Women protest against infant circumcision in front of the White House in 2013; captions read: "All Babies Are Born Perfect. Keep Them This Way."

Comparing male circumcision to FGM is highly controversial. Many organizations involved in combating FGM have been at considerable pains to distinguish the two, as this UNICEF document explains: "When the practice first came to be known beyond the societies in which it was traditionally carried out, it was generally referred to as 'female circumcision'. This term, however, draws a direct parallel with male circumcision and, as a result, creates confusion between these two distinct practices." This stance has been largely echoed by Western medical and political authorities. A Royal Dutch Medical Association viewpoint says that the form of female genital mutilation that resembles non-therapeutic circumcision the most is rejected unanimously throughout literature. The Association also says "FGM takes many forms. There is the most severe form, infibulation, in which the inner and outer labia are stitched together and the clitoris is removed. However, there are less extreme forms of FGM, in which only the foreskin of the clitoris is removed." This type of mutilation that removes the prepuce, also known as the clitoral hood, is called Type Ia.

In the United States, the organization MGMbill.org has sent a proposed bill to the US Congress and 15 state legislatures every year since 2004 in order to extend the prohibition on genital modification and mutilation of minors to include male and intersex children.

=== In U.S. politics ===
Though the issue of infant circumcision is generally not discussed by U.S. politicians, circumcision controversies have occasionally arisen in the U.S. political system.

In 2011, anti-circumcision activists in San Francisco gathered over 12,000 signatures to put a measure on the city's ballot in November that would ban circumcisions of males under 18. Proponents of the ban argued that circumcision is not medically necessary and that the choice should be left up to the child rather than the parents, while opponents of the ban, such as the American Civil Liberties Union and the American Jewish Committee, argued that circumcision is a recognized medical procedure with clear health benefits and that the measure would violate religious freedoms and cause unnecessary religious strife. The measure was ultimately removed from the ballot, as a court ruled that it would violate a state law leaving the regulation of medical procedures up to the state rather than cities. Following this, California governor Jerry Brown signed a law preventing localities in California from banning circumcision.

In 2019, then-candidate for the 2020 Democratic presidential nomination Andrew Yang declared himself "[a]gainst the practice" of routine infant circumcision. This received coverage from several outlets, as major politicians discussing circumcision has been rare, with Yang being the only candidate for the 2020 Democratic presidential nomination to talk about it. Though Yang said he would push for giving parents more information about this decision if elected, he also stated that he supported the parents' choice to have their child circumcised for religious or cultural reasons, and would not support a ban on the practice. Intact America's Georganne Chapin speculated that Yang's support of parental choice was likely a result of political pressure.

=== Other contemporary controversies ===
==== Controversy in Israel ====
Opposition to circumcision exists among Jews in Israel. Protests for children's rights have occurred there. Even though there is often pressure from family on parents to circumcise their sons, "more and more families" are preferring to abstain from circumcision. The alternative practice to Brit milah that does not involve circumcision is Brit shalom.

==== Controversy in South Africa ====
In the Xhosa areas of South Africa, the large death toll from traditional circumcision provides a constant source of friction between traditional leaders, who oppose medicalised procedures, and health authorities. In 2009 in the Eastern Cape Province alone, 80 boys died and hundreds were hospitalized after attending initiation schools. The controversy looked set to spread in 2010 to the Zulu, after king Goodwill Zwelithini called for the reintroduction of customary circumcision after it was banned by Zulu king Shaka in the 19th century. Similar issues, though on a smaller scale, have arisen with traditional circumcision of Aborigines in remote areas of central Australia.

==== Controversy in Germany ====
On 26 June 2012, a court in Cologne, Germany, ruled that circumcision was "inflicting bodily harm on boys too young to consent", deciding that the practice contravenes the "interests of the child to decide later in life on his religious beliefs". The decision was based on the article "Criminal Relevance of Circumcising Boys. A Contribution to the Limitation of Consent in Cases of Care for the Person of the Child" published by Holm Putzke, a German law professor at the University of Passau. The court's decision that a child's right to physical integrity trumps religious and parental rights applied only within the jurisdiction of that court, the city of Cologne. The ruling was condemned by Jewish and Muslim groups in Europe. A broad majority of German lawmakers passed a resolution asking Angela Merkel's government to clarify the ruling so as to allow Jews and Muslims to continue to practice their religion. On 12 December 2012, following a series of hearings and consultations, the Bundestag adopted a law explicitly permitting non-therapeutic circumcision to be performed under certain conditions by a vote of 434–100, with 46 abstentions.

==== Controversy in Turkey ====
Muslim men's opposition against male circumcision in Turkey maintains a strong connection with religious responsibilities and masculinity construction in Turkey.

== Anti-circumcision movement ==
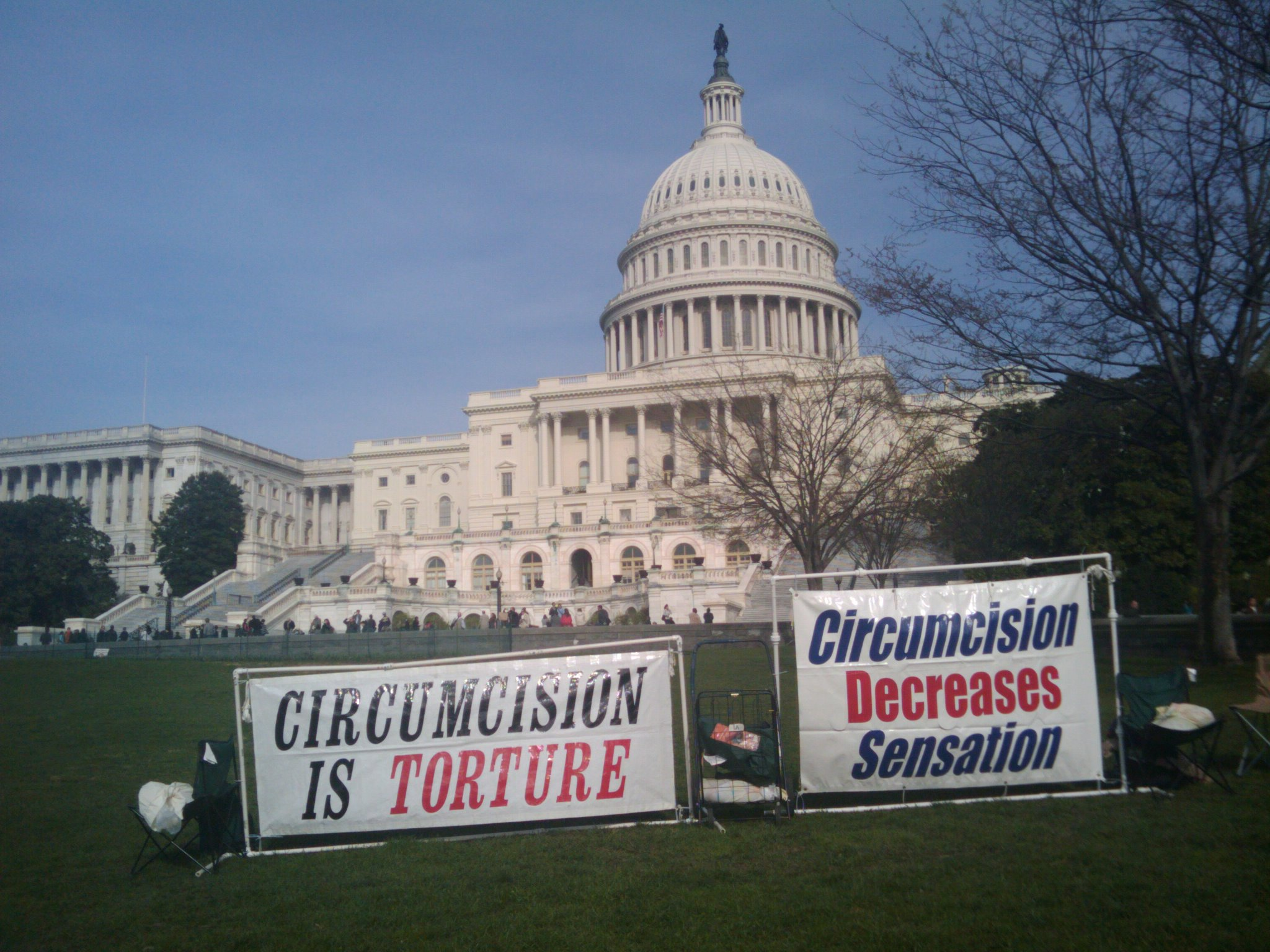
Anti-circumcision protest at Capitol Hill in 2011

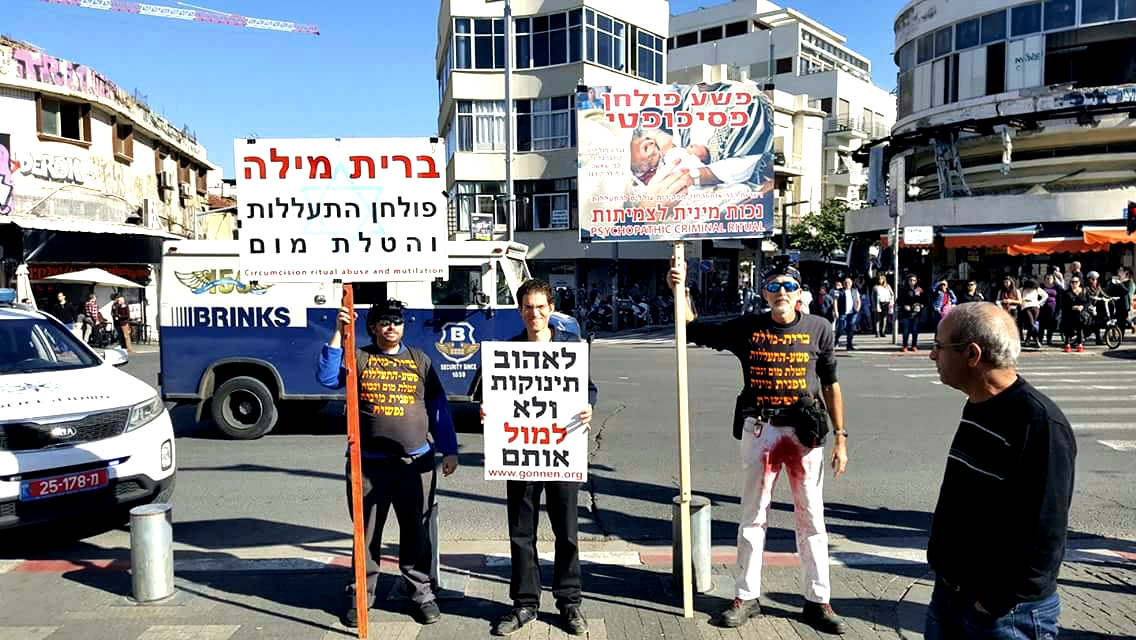
Secular Israeli Jews (Hilonim) protest against ritual circumcision (brit milah) in Tel Aviv

Anti-circumcision activists, sometimes called intactivists (a portmanteau of intact and activist), consider circumcision to be genital mutilation, and celebrate the foreskin as a natural, beneficial, and functional part of the penis. Various organisations have been set up specifically for the purpose, and other organizations have stated their support for the movement.

Name	Founded	Region served	Notes
Bloodstained Men & Their Friends (BSM)	2012	United States	Known for public protests in white overalls with bloodstains around their crotches.
Children's Health and Human Rights Partnership	2012	Canada	Application of Canadian Charter of Rights and Freedoms
Circumcision Resource Center	1991	United States	"Our nonprofit educational organization raises awareness, helps healing, and informs about sexual, psychological, and traumatic effects, medical issues, and cultural bias."
Circumstitions – The Intactivism Pages	1994	World	Based in New Zealand, The site has pages on both the role of the foreskin and on cultural, social aspects and media treatment of circumcision.
Doctors Opposing Circumcision	1995	United States	Publishes medical information regarding non-therapeutic male circumcision. Based in Seattle, Washington.
Genital Autonomy America (GAA)	1985	United States	Merged with Intact America in 2021. Previously called National Organization of Circumcision Information Resource Centers (NOCIRC). Based in San Anselmo, California.
Genital Autonomy Legal Defense and Education Fund (GALDEF)	2022	United States	Genital autonomy advocates and legal professionals pursuing impact litigation to protect children's bodily integrity rights.
Intact America	2008	United States	Intact America is the largest organization working to end child genital cutting. Based in Tarrytown, New York.
Intact Australia	2012	Australia	Defense of human rights of boys
Intaction	2010	United States	Based in Brooklyn, New York.
IntactiWiki	2014	World	Information resource.
intaktiv e.V. – eine Stimme für genitale Selbstbestimmung (German: A Voice for Genital Autonomy)	2013	Germany	Is a registered charity since November 2013 Based in Mainz.
Jews Against Circumcision (JAC)	2011	World	
Justice for Men & Boys (and the women who love them) (J4MB)	2013	United Kingdom	Circumcision has been the political party's primary campaigning issue since 2014, and the topic is covered in the party's 2015 general election manifesto.
Men Do Complain (MDC)	2012	United Kingdom	Based in London.
15Square, Formerly NORM-UK	1994	United Kingdom	Based in Stone, Staffordshire.
Seminal Church	2020	World	The Seminal Church actively opposes both male and female circumcision worldwide. It commits time and funding toward ending the practice of circumcision worldwide.
Your Whole Baby	2014	United States	"Your Whole Baby's mission is to provide parents-to-be and healthcare providers about the functions and care of the foreskin..."
Genital Autonomy Collective	2022	United States & Global	Focus on solidarity in resisting Female, Male, and Intersex genital mutilation. Explicitly transgender inclusive.

== See also ==
- Female Genital Mutilation
- Foreskin
- Foreskin restoration
- History of circumcision
- Legality of circumcision
- Intersex & intersex genital mutilations
- Masculism
- Men's Rights Movement
- Genital modification and mutilation
- My body, my choice
- Reproductive rights
- David Reimer
