= Circumcision and law =

Laws concerning male circumcision

Laws restricting, regulating, or banning circumcision, some dating back to ancient history, have been enacted in many countries and communities. In the case of non-therapeutic circumcision of children, proponents of laws in favor of the procedure often point to the rights of the parents or practitioners, namely the right of freedom of religion. Those against the procedure point to the boy's right of freedom from religion. In several court cases, judges have pointed to the irreversible nature of the act,grievous body harm, as well as the right to self-determination, and bodily integrity.

== History ==
=== Judaism ===
There are ancient religious requirements for circumcision. The Hebrew Bible commands Jews to circumcise their male children on the eighth day of life, and to circumcise their male slaves. Laws which ban circumcision are also ancient. The ancient Greeks prized the foreskin and disapproved of the Jewish custom of circumcision. 1 Maccabees, 1:60–61 states that King Antiochus IV of Syria, the occupying power of Judea in 170 BCE, outlawed circumcision on penalty of death, one of the grievances leading to the Maccabean Revolt.

According to the Historia Augusta, the Roman emperor Hadrian issued a decree which banned circumcision in the empire, and some modern scholars argue that this was a main cause of the Jewish Bar Kokhba revolt of 132 CE. The Roman historian Cassius Dio, however, made no mention of such a law, instead, he blamed the Jewish uprising on Hadrian's decision to rebuild Jerusalem and rename it Aelia Capitolina, a city dedicated to Jupiter.

Antoninus Pius permitted Jews to circumcise their own sons. However, he forbade the circumcision of non-Jewish males who were either foreign-born slaves of Jews and the circumcision of non-Jewish males who were members of Jewish households, in violation of Genesis 17:12. He also banned non-Jewish men from converting to Judaism. Antoninus Pius exempted the Egyptian priesthood from the otherwise universal ban on circumcision. Constantine the Great made it illegal to circumcise Christian slaves, and punished the owners who allowed it by freeing the Christian from slavery.

=== Ecclesiastical canon law in Christianity ===
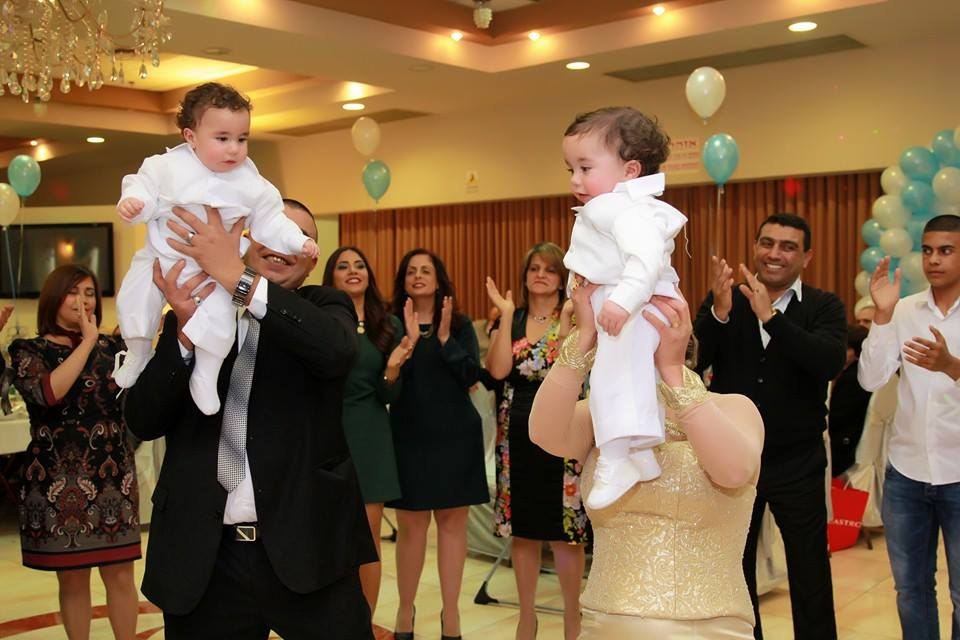
Coptic children wearing traditional circumcision costumes

Circumcision has also played a major role in Christian history and theology. The Council of Jerusalem in the early Christian Church declared that circumcision was not necessary for Christians; covenant theology largely views the Christian sacrament of baptism as fulfilling the Israelite practice of circumcision, both being signs and seals of the covenant of grace. Though mainstream Christian denominations maintain a neutral position on routine circumcision, it is widely practiced in many Christian communities.

Historically, the Lutheran Churches have also not practiced circumcision among their communicants. Currently the Catholic Church maintains a neutral position on the practice of non-religious circumcision. Today, many Christian denominations are neutral about ritual male circumcision, not requiring it for religious observance, but neither forbidding it for cultural or other reasons.

On the other hand, in Oriental Christianity, the Coptic Orthodox Church and Eritrean Orthodox Church require that their male members undergo circumcision. It is common but not required for members of the Ethiopian Orthodox Church. The Liturgy of the Ethiopian Church states "Henceforth, let us not be circumcised like the Jews. We know that He who had to fulfil the law and the prophets has already come."

=== Soviet Union ===
Before glasnost, according to an article in The Jewish Press, Jewish ritual circumcision was forbidden in the Soviet Union. However, David E. Fishman, professor of Jewish History at the Jewish Theological Seminary of America, states that, whereas the heder and yeshiva, the organs of Jewish education, "were banned by virtue of the law separating church and school, and subjected to tough police and administrative actions", circumcision was not proscribed by law or suppressed by executive measures.

Jehoshua A. Gilboa writes that while circumcision was not officially or explicitly banned, pressure was exerted to make it difficult. Mohels in particular were concerned that they could be punished for any health issue that might develop, even if it arose some time after the circumcision.

=== Albania ===
In 1967, all religion in Communist Albania was banned, along with the practice of circumcision. The practice was driven underground and many boys were secretly circumcised.

== International law ==
=== Council of Europe ===
On 1 October 2013, the Parliamentary Assembly of the Council of Europe adopted a non-binding resolution in which they state they are "particularly worried about a category of violation of the physical integrity of children", and included in this category "circumcision of young boys for religious reasons". On 7 October, Israel's president Shimon Peres wrote a personal missive to the Secretary General of the Council of Europe, Thorbjørn Jagland, to stop the "ban", arguing: "The Jewish communities across Europe would be greatly afflicted to see their cultural and religious freedom impeded upon by the Council of Europe, an institution devoted to the protection of these very rights." Two days later, Jagland clarified that the resolution was non-binding and that "Nothing in the body of our legally binding standards would lead us to put on equal footing the issue of female genital mutilation and the circumcision of young boys for religious reasons."

=== European Union ===
A study commissioned by the European Parliament Committee on Civil Liberties, Justice and Home Affairs published in February 2013 stated that "Male circumcision for non-therapeutic reasons appears to be practiced with relative regularity and frequency throughout Europe," and said it was "the only scenario, among the topics discussed in the present chapter, in which the outcome of the balancing between the right to physical integrity and religious freedom is in favour of the latter." The study recommended that "the best interests of children should be paramount, while acknowledging the relevance of this practice for Muslims and Jews. Member States should ensure that circumcision of underage children is performed according to the medical profession's art and under conditions that do not put the health of minors at risk. The introduction of regulations by the Member States in order to set the conditions and the appropriate medical training for those called to perform it is warranted."

=== 2013 Nordic ombudsmen statement ===
On 30 September 2013, the children's ombudsmen of all five Nordic countries – Denmark, Finland, Iceland, Norway, and Sweden – together with the children's spokesperson from Greenland and representatives of associations of Nordic paediatricians and paediatric surgeons, gathered in Oslo to discuss the issue, and released a joint declaration proposing a ban on non-therapeutic circumcision of male minors:

Let boys decide for themselves whether or not they want to be circumcised

Circumcision without a medical indication on a person unable to provide informed consent conflicts with basic principles of medical ethics, particularly because the operation is irreversible, painful and may cause serious complications. There are no health-related reasons to circumcise young boys in the Nordic countries. Arguments that may argue in favour of circumcision in adult men are of little relevance to children in the Nordic area. Boys can make up their own minds about the operation when they get old enough to provide informed consent.

As ombudsmen for children and experts in children's health we consider circumcision of underage boys without a medical indication to be in conflict with the UN Convention of the Rights of the Child, article 12, about children's right to express their views about their own matters, and article 24, pt. 3, which says that children must be protected against traditional rituals that may be harmful to their health.

In 2013, the UN Human Rights Council has urged all states to end operations that compromise the integrity and dignity of children and are prejudicial to the health of both girls and boys. We consider it central that parental rights in this matter do not have precedence over children's right to bodily integrity. What is in children's best interest must always come first, even if this may limit an adult's right to carry out their religious or traditional rituals.

The Nordic ombudsmen for children and experts in children's health therefore want to work towards a situation, where a circumcision can only be performed, if a boy, who has reached the age and level of maturity required to understand necessary medical information, consents to the operation. We wish a respectful dialogue among all parties involved about how to best ensure boys' self determination with respect to circumcision. We also urge our governments to inform about children's rights and health-related risks and consequences of the operation. We ask the Nordic governments to take the necessary steps towards ensuring that boys get the right to decide for themselves whether or not they want to be circumcised.

— 'Signed by Anne Lindboe, Norwegian ombudswoman for children; Fredrik Malmberg, Swedish ombudsman for children; Maria Kaisa Aula, Finnish ombudswoman for children; Per Larsen, Chairman of the Danish Children's Council; Margrét Maria Sigurdardóttir, Icelandic ombudswoman for children; Anja Chemnitz Larsen, Greenlandic Children's spokesperson, as well as by representatives of Nordic associations of pediatricians and pediatric surgeons.'

== Modern laws by country ==
As of February 2018, no European country has a ban on male circumcision.

Whereas child custody regulations have been applied to cases involving circumcision, there seems to be no state which currently unequivocally bans infant male circumcision for non-therapeutic reasons, albeit the legality of such circumcision is disputed in some legislations.

The present table provides a non-exhaustive overview comparing legal restrictions and requirements on non-therapeutic infant circumcision in several countries. Some countries require one or both parents to consent to the operation; some of these (Finland, United Kingdom) have experienced legal battles between parents when one of them had their son's circumcision carried out or planned without the other's consent. Some countries require the procedure to be performed by or supervised by a qualified physician (or a qualified nurse in Sweden), and with (local) anaesthesia applied to the boy or man.

Legal restrictions and requirements on non-therapeutic infant circumcision by country
Country	Parental consent	Anaesthesia	Qualified physician	Payment	Notes
Belgium				Taxpayers	Health Minister rejected Bioethics Advisory Committee's recommended ban
Denmark				Parents	
Finland	Both parents			Parents	
France	Both parents			Parents	
Germany				Parents	Children under 6 months may be circumcised by "specially qualified members of religious communities", otherwise only by physician.
Israel			Performing or supervising		Under six months, otherwise medical reason needed
Italy				Parents	No longer available in public health institutions.
Netherlands	Both parents			Parents	
Norway		Required	Supervising	Parents	Parents and clerics need to wait outside the operating room. There is an ongoing debate regarding the legality of circumcision.
Saudi Arabia			Performing		
South Africa			Performing		Illegal to circumcise under 16 without religious reason. Stronger restrictions on circumcisions not up to medical standards.
Spain				Parents	
Sweden		Required	Supervising	Parents	Under two months, unless performed by licensed physician.
United Kingdom	Both parents			Parents	In only 6.2% of studied cases both parents consented.
Australia				Parents	Banned in public hospitals, available in private hospitals and clinics.
Ireland			Performing		

=== Australia ===
The Royal Australasian College of Physicians (RACP) stated that routine infant circumcision is not warranted in Australia and New Zealand and that, since circumcision involves physical injury, physicians ought to raise and consider with parents and considered the option of leaving circumcision until later, when the boy is old enough to make a decision for himself:

After reviewing the currently available evidence, the RACP believes that the frequency of diseases modifiable by circumcision, the level of protection offered by circumcision and the complication rates of circumcision do not warrant routine infant circumcision in Australia and New Zealand. ... Since circumcision involves physical risks which are undertaken for the sake of psychosocial benefits or debatable medical benefit to the child, ... The option of leaving circumcision until later, when the boy is old enough to make a decision for himself does need to be raised with parents and considered.

— (Australia) Royal Australasian College of Physicians

In 1993, a non-binding research paper of the Queensland Law Reform Commission (Circumcision of Male Infants) concluded that "On a strict interpretation of the assault provisions of the Queensland Criminal Code, routine circumcision of a male infant could be regarded as a criminal act," and that doctors who perform circumcision on male infants may be liable to civil claims by that child at a later date. No prosecutions have occurred in Queensland.

In 1999, a Perth man won A$360,000 in damages after a doctor admitted he botched a circumcision operation at birth which left the man with a badly deformed penis.

In 2002, Queensland police charged a father with grievous bodily harm for having his two sons, then aged nine and five, circumcised without the knowledge and against the wishes of the mother. The mother and father were in a family court dispute. The charges were dropped when the police prosecutor revealed that he did not have all family court paperwork in court and the magistrate refused to grant an adjournment.

Cosmetic circumcision for newborn males is currently banned in all Australian public hospitals, South Australia being the last state to adopt the ban in 2007; the procedure was not forbidden from being performed in private hospitals. In the same year, the Tasmanian President of the Australian Medical Association, Haydn Walters, stated that they would support a call to ban circumcision for non-medical, non-religious reasons. In 2009, the Tasmanian Law Reform Institute released its Issues Paper investigating the law relating to male circumcision in Tasmania, it "highlights the uncertainty in relation to whether doctors can legally perform circumcision on infant males".

The Tasmania Law Reform Institute released its recommendations for reform of Tasmanian law relative to male circumcision on 21 August 2012. The report makes fourteen recommendations for reform of Tasmanian law relative to male circumcision.

=== Belgium ===
The Belgian Advisory Committee on Bioethics stated that circumcision is a radical operation, and that physical integrity of the child takes precedence over parents' belief systems.

In 2012, Le Soir reported a 21% increase in the amount of circumcisions in Belgium from 2006 and 2011. In the previous 25 years, one in three Belgian-born boys had allegedly been circumcised. A questionnaire to hospitals in Wallonia and Brussels showed that about 80 to 90% of the procedures had religious or cultural motives. The Ministry of Health stressed the importance of safe circumstances, physicians warned that "no surgical procedure is without risk" and that circumcision was "not a necessary procedure".

In 2017, it was estimated that about 15% of Belgian men were circumcised. The incidence has been gradually rising: in 2002, about 17,800 boys or men underwent circumcision, which increased to almost 26,200 in 2016. The expenses of undergoing circumcision are covered by the National Institute for Disease and Disability Insurance (RIZIV/INAMI), costing about 2.7 million euros in 2016. After inquiries were submitted to the Belgian Bioethics Advisory Committee in early 2014, an ethics commission was set up to review the morality of covering the costs of circumcisions without medical necessity, through taxpayer money, especially considering that many taxpayers regard the practice as immoral.

By July 2017, the commission reportedly reached consensus on discontinuing the financial coverage of non-medical circumcision, but was still debating whether to advise the government to institute a total ban of the practice. The commission's final (non-binding) recommendation, presented on 19 September 2017, was to cease public funding for non-medical circumcision, and to not circumcise anyone underage until they can consent or reject the procedure after being properly informed. This was in line with the 1990 Convention on the Rights of the Child, and mirrors the 2013 non-binding Parliamentary Assembly of the Council of Europe's resolution against underage non-therapeutic circumcision. However, Health Minister Maggie De Block rejected the commission's advice, arguing the RIZIV "cannot know whether there is a medical motive or not" when parents request a circumcision, and when they are denied a professional procedure, chances are parents will have a non-expert perform it, leading to worse results for the children. The Health Minister's response was received with mixed reactions.

In 2026, Belgium indicted two mohels (Jewish ritual circumcisers) for allegedly performing illegal circumcisions. Israeli and U.S. diplomats condemned the indictment. “With this act Belgium joins a short and shameful list, together with Ireland, of countries that use criminal law to prosecute Jews for practicing Judaism,” said Israeli Foreign Minister Gideon Saar. U.S. Ambassador to Belgium Bill White said it was a “shameful stain” on the European country. Belgian Foreign Minister Maxime Prévot defended the indictment: “To portray this as a country’s effort to undermine the religious freedom of Jews is defamatory. This freedom has never been called into question and never will be in our country. Our Constitution protects it,” he continued.

Jewish leaders and diplomats said the recommendation to refer the mohels to criminal court was “effectively criminalizing the act of circumcision” and infringing on religious freedom. In an open letter, they said the potential prosecutions signal that “Jews are no longer welcome in Belgium” and “Belgian Jews are now second class citizens with limited rights.” Belgium’s foreign minister said it was “inappropriate to publicly criticize a country and tarnish its image simply because you disagree with judicial proceedings.” The two mohels were first investigated after a rabbi claimed six area mohels used performed practiced metzitzah b’peh on infants.

=== Canada ===
The Canadian Paediatric Society does not recommend routine circumcision, finding that medical necessity has not been clearly established, and as such, that it should be deferred until the individual concerned is able to make his own choices.

According to the College of Physicians and Surgeons of British Columbia:

To date, the legality of infant male circumcision has not been tested in the Courts. It is thus assumed to be legal if it is performed competently, in the child's best interest, and after valid consent has been obtained.

At all times the physician must perform the procedure with competence and at all times, the parent and physician must act in the best interests of the child. Signed parental consent for any treatment is assumed to be valid if the parent understands the nature of the procedure and its associated risks and benefits. However, proxy consent by parents is now being questioned. Many believe it should be limited to consent for diagnosis and treatment of medical conditions, and that it is not relevant for non-therapeutic procedures."

=== Denmark ===
Circumcision is legal in Denmark, and each year 1,000 to 2,000 boys are circumcised for non-medical reasons, the Danish Health Authority estimated in 2013, with most circumcisions being performed on Muslim or Jewish boys in private clinics or private homes. For boys below the age of 15, circumcision requires consent from the parents, while the boy can consent when he is 15 years or older. Circumcision is classified as an operation and reserved for doctors, though the responsible doctor can delegate the actual operation to non-medical person, as long as the doctor is present. The operation requires "sufficient pain relief (analgesic) and sedation (Anesthesia)" The doctor is responsible for having the necessary qualifications (both for the operation and the pain relief) and for being informed about the newest scientific developments in the area.

The current guidelines for non-medical circumcision are from 2013, and as of August 2020, a committee under the Danish Patient Health Authority are in the process of updating them. In August 2020, the Danish Society of Anaesthesiology and Intensive Care Medicine withdrew from the committee, because they disagreed with the Authority's opinion that local anaesthesia was sufficient, instead saying the scientific literature showed that general anaesthesia was necessary. Other professional organizations followed them, and according to DR, only the Authority and two private clinics that perform circumcisions remain in the committee.

The Danish population overwhelmingly support a ban on non-medical circumcision of boys below the age of 18. A 2020 survey measured the support at 86%, while surveys in 2018, 2016 and 2014 measured the support at 83%, 87% and 74%, respectively In 2018, a citizen's initiative calling for such a ban reached the threshold of 50.000 signatures to be put forward in the Folketing. It was subsequently found compliant with the Danish Constitution, in particularly §67 on religious freedom. The Danish Medical Association believes boys should decide for themselves after they turn 18 years old, but does not call for a ban. Politicians are hesitant in supporting a ban, with protection of religious freedom, in particular the Jewish practice of circumcision, and potential foreign policy and national security ramifications mentioned as some of the reasons.

As of September 2020, the Social Democrats and Venstre, who together hold a majority in the Folketing, oppose a ban, while the Danish People's Party, the Socialist People's Party, Red-Green Alliance, The Alternative, The New Right and Liberal Alliance favour a ban. The Conservative and the Social Liberal Party have no official opinion on the question.

In favour of a ban

- Danish People's Party
- Socialist People's Party
- Red-Green Alliance
- The Alternative
- The New Right
- Liberal Alliance

Against a ban

- Social Democrats
- Venstre

Neutral

- Conservative People's Party
- Social Liberal Party

With a two-thirds majority against, the Folketing voted against a ban on circumcision in May 2021.

=== Finland ===
The Finnish Ombudsman for Equality finds that circumcising young boys without a medical reason is legally highly questionable, The Finnish Supreme Court ruled that non-therapeutic circumcision of boys is assault, and the Finnish Ombudsman for Children proposed that Finland should ban non-therapeutic circumcision of young boys:

The Deputy Ombudsman took the view that circumcising young boys, who are unable to give their consent, without a medical reason is highly questionable from a legal standpoint. ... On 31 March 2016, the Supreme Court adopted two decisions that complement a previous precedent in which the Court found that the non-medical circumcision of boys constitutes an assault offence but is not punishable when it is considered to be in the best interests of the child. In 2015, the Finnish Ombudsman for Children Tuomas Kurttila proposed that Finland should enact an act prohibiting the non-medical circumcision of young boys.

— (Finland) Finnish Ombudsman for Equality

In August 2006, a Finnish court ruled that the circumcision of a four-year-old boy arranged by his mother, who is Muslim, to be an illegal assault. The boy's father, who had not been consulted, reported the incident to the police. A local prosecutor stated that the prohibition of circumcision is not gender-specific in Finnish law. A lawyer for the Ministry of Social Affairs and Health stated that there is neither legislation nor prohibition on male circumcision, and that "the operations have been performed on the basis of common law." The case was appealed and in October 2008 the Finnish Supreme Court ruled that the circumcision, "carried out for religious and social reasons and in a medical manner, did not have the earmarks of a criminal offence. It pointed out in its ruling that the circumcision of Muslim boys is an established tradition and an integral part of the identity of Muslim men".

In 2008, the Finnish government was reported to be considering a new law to legalise circumcision if the practitioner is a doctor and if the child consents. In December 2011, Helsinki District Court said that the Supreme Court's decision does not mean that circumcision is legal for any non-medical reasons. The court referred to the Convention on Human rights and Biomedicine of the Council of Europe, which was ratified in Finland in 2010.

In February 2010, a Jewish couple were fined for causing bodily harm to their then infant son who was circumcised in 2008 by a mohel brought in from the UK. Normal procedure for persons of Jewish faith in Finland is to have a locally certified mohel who works in Finnish healthcare perform the operation. In the 2008 case, the infant was not anesthetized and developed complications that required immediate hospital care. The parents were ordered to pay 1500 euros in damages to their child.

In November 2020, the Finnish Parliament passed a new law on female genital mutilation. An earlier version of the draft law could also have criminalised nonmedical infant circumcision, but due to intense lobbying by several Islamic and Jewish organisations including the Central Council of Finnish Jewish Communities, Milah UK, and the European Jewish Congress, the wording was changed and instead, the law passed in Parliament now states that the issue of circumcision of boys should be "clarified" in the future.

In favour of a ban

- Social Democratic Party of Finland
- Finns Party
- Green League
- Finnish Ombudsman for Children
- Finnish Ombudsman for Equality

Against a ban

- Christian Democrats
- Central Council of Finnish Jewish Communities

=== Germany ===
The German Association of Pediatricians (BVKJ) finds no medical reason for non-therapeutic circumcision and stated that the AAP (2012) recommendation was scientifically unsustainable, and that boys should have the same constitutional legal right to physical integrity as girls:

From a medical point of view, there is no reason to remove the intact foreskin of underage and non-consenting boys. ... The tip of the foreskin is richly supplied with blood by important vascular structures. The foreskin serves as a connecting channel for numerous important veins. Circumcision can contribute to erectile dysfunction by destroying these blood lines. Their removal can, as the accounts of many sufferers show, lead to considerable restrictions on the sexual experience and mental stress. The frequently cited AAP opinion (DOI: 10.1542 / peds.2012-1989 Pediatrics "originally published online 27 Aug. 2012) contradicts earlier statements by the same organization without being able to invoke new research findings. This AAP opinion is now considered scientifically unsustainable by almost all other pediatric societies and associations in the world. ... The WHO recommendation on prophylactic circumcision also applies only to sexually mature sexually active men in low-hygiene countries and cannot be used as a basis for the prophylactic circumcision underage boys. ... Worldwide, no medical professional society, not even the AAP, sees such a significant advantage in the general circumcision of young boys that it generally recommends them. ... Religious regulations must not influence doctors in their care for their patients - and underage children deserve our very special care here. According to our sense of justice, boys have the same constitutional legal right to physical integrity as girls; they must not be disadvantaged because of their gender (Article 3 of the Basic Law). Parental rights and religious freedom end where the physical integrity of a child who is under the age of consent is not affected (Article 2 of the Basic Law) without a clear medical indication.

— (Germany) German Association of Paediatricians

In October 2006, a Turkish national who performed ritual circumcisions on seven boys was convicted of causing dangerous bodily harm by the state court in Düsseldorf.

In September 2007, a Frankfurt am Main appeals court found that the circumcision of an 11-year-old boy without his approval was an unlawful personal injury. The boy, whose parents were divorced, was visiting his Muslim father during a vacation when his father forced him to be ritually circumcised. The boy had planned to sue his father for €10,000.

In May 2012, the Cologne regional appellate court ruled that religious circumcision of male children amounts to bodily injury, and is a criminal offense in the area under its jurisdiction. The decision based on the article "Criminal Relevance of Circumcising Boys. A Contribution to the Limitation of Consent in Cases of Care for the Person of the Child" published by Holm Putzke, a German law professor at the University of Passau. The court arrived at its judgment by application of the human rights provisions of the Basic Law, a section of the Civil Code, and some sections of the Criminal Code to non-therapeutic circumcision of male children. Some observers said it could set a legal precedent that criminalizes the practice. Jewish and Muslim groups were outraged by the ruling, viewing it as trampling on freedom of religion.

The German ambassador to Israel, Andreas Michaelis, told Israeli lawmakers that Germany was working to resolve the issue and that it does not apply at a national level, but instead only to the local jurisdiction of the court in Cologne. The Council of the Coordination of Muslims in Germany condemned the ruling, stating that it is "a serious attack on religious freedom". Ali Kizilkaya, a spokesman of the council, stated that, "The ruling does not take everything into account, religious practice concerning circumcision of young Muslims and Jews has been carried out over the millennia on a global level." The Roman Catholic archbishop of Aachen, Heinrich Mussinghoff, said that the ruling was "very surprising", and the contradiction between "basic rights on freedom of religion and the well-being of the child brought up by the judges is not convincing in this very case". Hans Ulrich Anke, the head of the Protestant Church in Germany, said the ruling should be appealed since it did not "sufficiently" consider the religious significance of the rite. A spokesman, Steffen Seibert, for German Chancellor Angela Merkel stated that Jewish and Muslim communities will be free to practice circumcision responsibly, and the government would find a way around the local ban in Cologne. The spokesman stated "For everyone in the government it is absolutely clear that we want to have Jewish and Muslim religious life in Germany. Circumcision carried out in a responsible manner must be possible in this country without punishment."

In July 2012, a group of rabbis, imams, and others said that they view the ruling against circumcision "an affront on our basic religious and human rights". The joint statement was signed by leaders of groups including Germany's Turkish-Islamic Union for Religious Affairs, the Islamic Center Brussels, the Rabbinical Centre of Europe, the European Jewish Parliament and the European Jewish Association, who met with members of European Parliament from Germany, Finland, Belgium, Italy, and Poland. European rabbis, who urged Jews to continue circumcision, planned further talks with Muslim and Christian leaders to determine how they can oppose the ban together. The Jewish Hospital of Berlin suspended the practice of male circumcision. On 19 July 2012, a joint resolution of the CDU/CSU, SPD and FDP factions in the Bundestag requesting the executive branch to draft a law permitting circumcision of boys to be performed without unnecessary pain in accordance with best medical practice carried with a broad majority.

The New York Times reported that the German Medical Association "condemned the ruling for potentially putting children at risk by taking the procedure out of the hands of doctors, but it also warned surgeons not to perform circumcisions for religious reasons until legal clarity was established". The ruling was supported by Deutsche Kinderhilfe, a German child rights organization, which asked for a two-year moratorium to discuss the issue and pointed out that religious circumcision may contravene the Convention on the Rights of the Child (Article 24.3: "States Parties shall take all effective and appropriate measures with a view to abolishing traditional practices prejudicial to the health of children.").

The German Academy for Pediatric and Adolescent Medicine (Deutsche Akademie für Kinder- und Jugendmedizin e.V., DAKJ), the German Association for Pediatric Surgery (Deutsche Gesellschaft für Kinderchirurgie, DGKCH) and the Professional Association of Pediatric and Adolescent Physicians (Berufsverband der Kinder- und Jugendärzte) took a firm stand against non-medical routine infant circumcision.

In July, in Berlin, a criminal complaint was lodged against Rabbi Yitshak Ehrenberg for "causing bodily harm" by performing religious circumcision, and for vocal support of the continuation of the practice. In September, the prosecutors dismissed the complaint, concluding that "there is no proof to establish that the rabbi's conduct met the 'condition of a criminal' violation".

In September, Reuters reported "Berlin's senate said doctors could legally circumcise infant boys for religious reasons in its region, given certain conditions."

On 12 December 2012, following a series of hearings and consultations, the Bundestag adopted the proposed law explicitly permitting non-therapeutic circumcision to be performed under certain conditions; it is now §1631(d) in the German Civil Code. The vote tally was 434 ayes, 100 noes, and 46 abstentions. Following approval by the Bundesrat and signing by the Bundespräsident, the new law became effective on 28 December 2012 a day after its publication in the Federal Gazette.

=== Iceland ===
In May 2005, Iceland amended its General Penal Code to criminalise female genital mutilation

Any person who, in an assault, causes physical injury or damage to the health of a girl child or woman by removing her sexual organs, partly or in their entirety, shall be imprisoned for up to 6 years. If the assault results in serious physical injury or health damage, or in death, or if it is considered particularly reprehensible due to the method used, punishment for the offence shall take the form of up to 16 years' imprisonment

— General Penal Code, Article 218 a

In February 2018, the Progressive Party proposed a bill that would change the words "girl child" to "child" and "her sexual organs" to "[their] sexual organs", thereby making Iceland the first European country to ban male circumcision for non-medical reasons. The bill was ultimately put on hold later that year following pressure from the United States, Israel, and various lobbyist groups.

In favour of the proposed ban (March 2018)

- Progressive Party
- People's Party
- Left-Green Movement
- Pirate Party
- Jews Against Circumcision

Against the proposed ban (March 2018)

- European Jewish Congress
- Islamic Cultural Centre of Iceland
- Catholic Church
- Anti-Defamation League

=== Ireland ===
The legality of non-therapeutic circumcision of infants is unclear in Ireland. In 2003, an expert in medical law suggested that the Constitution of Ireland's guarantees of family autonomy would probably trump concern for the child's bodily autonomy. Until the 1990s the practice was largely confined to the brit milah of the small Jewish community, generally performed by a mohel travelling from Great Britain and certified there by the Initiation Society, with no concern from law enforcement. The increased immigration beginning in the Celtic Tiger period included people with Muslim or African traditions of circumcision.

In August 2003 in Waterford, the 29-day-old son of Nigerian parents died from hemorrhage and shock after an attempted circumcision by a Nigerian "fourth-generation circumcisionist", who was charged with reckless endangerment. The boy's parents had enquired about circumcision within the health service, but such requests were routinely declined by the local health board until a review after the death. At the 2005 trial, the prosecution argued that "the carrying out of a circumcision by a non-medical person was not an offence in Ireland", but that the accused had failed to provide aftercare support and advice, so that the parents had waited too long (12 hours) before taking the infant to hospital. The judge instructed the jury 'not to bring their "white Western values" to bear upon their deliberations'; the accused was found not guilty. Kevin Myers commented, 'May you ineptly circumcise an Irish boy-child and cause him to die if you are African because of your "culture", but not if you are Irish?' Jurist Máiréad Enright questioned the judge's "radical cultural relativism" and felt as a Circuit Court case it had "limited precedential value".

While the Waterford case was pending, the Minister for Health established an advisory committee on "cultural male circumcision". Its 2006 report recommended that circumcision be provided within the health service as an outpatient procedure by trained surgeons and anaesthetists. Circumcisions carried out by "untrained people" should be investigated by the Health Service Executive and might be prosecuted as child abuse. In 2020 another Nigerian traditional circumcisionist was jailed for 3 years after pleading guilty to reckless endangerment of a 10-month-old, who spent two weeks in hospital after a 2015 procedure without anaesthetic or proper sterilisation. The judge called it "a barbaric act of cruelty" and said the man should abide by Irish cultural norms.

On 30 July 2024 a London-based rabbi was arrested after performing a circumcision in a Dublin house with the parents' consent. He was charged with carrying out a surgical procedure without being a registered medical practitioner, contrary to the Medical Practitioners Act 2007. The accused is a mohel registered with the Initiation Society. The Chief Rabbi of Ireland said that the client family was not Jewish, but the Jewish community would be offering assistance to the mohel. The Jewish Chronicle suggested the reason the case was singled out for prosecution was because it was a "non-religious circumcision"; The Times of Israel linked it to an alleged increase in Irish antisemitism due to the Gaza war. On 6 August he was remanded for a further two weeks in anticipation of "multiple further charges" from the Director of Public Prosecutions. On 22 August he was granted bail at a hearing which was told no mohel had previously been prosecuted in such a case.

=== Israel ===
In Israel, Jewish circumcision is entirely legal. The circumcision rate is very high in Israel, although some limited data suggests the practice is slowly declining. According to an online survey by the parents' portal Mamy in 2006, the rate was 95%, while earlier estimates put it at 98–99%. Ben Shalem, an organisation dedicated to the abolition of circumcision, petitioned the Supreme Court in 1999 on the grounds that circumcision violated human dignity, children's rights and criminal law. The petition was rejected. In 2013, a Rabbinical court in Israel ordered a mother in the midst of divorce proceedings to circumcise her son in accordance with the father's wishes, or pay a fine of 500 Israeli Shekel for every day that the child is not circumcised. She appealed against the Rabbinical court ruling and the High Court ruled in her favour stating, among other considerations, the basic right of freedom from religion.

=== Netherlands ===
The Royal Dutch Medical Association (KNMG) stated non-therapeutic circumcision of male minors was in conflict with children's right to autonomy and physical integrity, and that there are good reasons for its legal prohibition, as exists for female genital mutilation:

- There is no convincing evidence that circumcision is useful or necessary in terms of prevention or hygiene. Partly in the light of the complications which can arise during or after circumcision, circumcision is not justifiable except on medical/therapeutic grounds. Insofar as there are medical benefits, such as a possibly reduced risk of HIV infection, it is reasonable to put off circumcision until the age at which such a risk is relevant and the boy himself can decide about the intervention, or can opt for any available alternatives.
- Contrary to what is often thought, circumcision entails the risk of medical and psychological complications. The most common complications are bleeding, infections, meatus stenosis (narrowing of the urethra) and panic attacks. Partial or complete penis amputations as a result of complications following circumcisions have also been reported, as have psychological problems as a result of the circumcision.
- Non-therapeutic circumcision of male minors is contrary to the rule that minors may only be exposed to medical treatments if illness or abnormalities are present, or if it can be convincingly demonstrated that the medical intervention is in the interest of the child, as in the case of vaccinations.
- Non-therapeutic circumcision of male minors conflicts with the child's right to autonomy and physical integrity.
- There are good reasons for a legal prohibition of non-therapeutic circumcision of male minors, as exists for female genital mutilation.

— (Netherlands) Royal Dutch Medical Association, 2010

In May 2008 a father who had his two sons, aged 3 and 6, circumcised against the will of their mother was found not guilty of abuse as the circumcision was performed by a physician and due to the court's restraint in setting a legal precedent; instead he was given a 6-week suspended jail sentence for taking the boys away from their mother against her will.

The parquet of the Supreme Court of the Netherlands made an elaborate statement on the legal status of circumcision on 5 July 2011 in the course of a criminal case. First, the parquet notes that there is no law that specifically prohibits the circumcision of boys, nor that the practice falls under the more general crime of (zware) mishandeling ('(grave) assault'). "Genital mutilation of girls in any case undoubtedly falls under (zware) mishandeling (Art. 300–303 Dutch Criminal Code). Whereas most forms of genital cutting of girls are generally marked as genital mutilation, a similar communis opinio regarding genital cutting of boys does not yet exist so far." The Supreme Court acknowledged that society's attitudes on genital cutting of boys had been gradually shifting over the course of years, and that "the increasing concern [in the medical world] about the harm and the risk of complications during a circumcision is indeed relevant", but that overall there were not enough reasons yet to proceed to criminalisation. Neither could intentional infliction of grave bodily harm (Art. 82 Dutch Criminal Code) be applied to the normal circumstances of a competently and hygienically performed circumcision in a clinic. And because young children are incapable of exercising the right to self-determination, parents ought to do this on their behalf. They can both request a circumcision to be performed, as well as consent to it being performed, on the grounds of their parental authority. However, it is important that both parents consent to the procedure.

In favour of a ban

- Christian Union, political party, on the basis of Article 11 of the Constitution concerning bodily integrity (from 2006 to 2011)
- Royal Dutch Medical Association (KNMG), federation of physicians (since 2010)
- Youth Organisation Freedom and Democracy, youth wing People's Party for Freedom and Democracy (VVD) (since 2014)
- Young Democrats, youth wing Democrats 66 (D66) (since 2017, favours a gradual increase of the minimum age for circumcision)
- PINK!, youth wing Party for the Animals (PvdD) (since 2018)

Against a ban

- Council of Public Health and Care (RVZ), medical advisory committee for parliament and government (since 2010)
- Rabbi Herman Loonstein, president of Federative Jewish Netherlands
- Christian Union, political party, on the basis of Article 6 of the Constitution concerning freedom of religion (since 2011)

=== Norway ===
The Norwegian Ombudsman for Children (Barneombudet) opposes circumcising children, and stated on 29 September 2013 that it is right to wait until children are old enough to decide for themselves:

The Ombudsman for Children is opposed to having children circumcised when they are so small that they are unable to express their views on it. Being circumcised is something that cannot be changed. Then we think it is right to wait until the children are old enough to decide for themselves.

— (Norway) Norwegian Ombudsman for Children

In June 2012, the centre-right Centre Party proposed a ban on circumcision on males under eighteen, after an Oslo infant died in May following a circumcision.

A bill on ritual circumcision of boys was passed (against two votes) in the Norwegian Parliament in June 2014, with the new law going into effect on 1 January 2015. This law explicitly allows Jews to practice brit milah and obligates the Norwegian Health Care regions to offer the Muslim minority a safe and affordable procedure. Local anaesthesia needs to be applied and a licensed physician needs to be present at the circumcision, which hospitals started to perform in March 2015.

In May 2017, the right-wing Progress Party proposed to ban circumcision for males under sixteen.

In favour of a ban

- Centre Party (under 18, since 2012)
- Progress Party (under 16, since 2017)
- Norwegian Ombudsman for Children

=== South Africa ===
The Children's Act 2005 makes the circumcision of male children under 16 unlawful except for religious or medical reasons. In the Eastern Cape province the Application of Health Standards in Traditional Circumcision Act, 2001, regulates traditional circumcision, which causes the death or mutilation of many youths by traditional surgeons each year. Among other provisions, the minimum age for circumcision is age 18.

In 2004, a 22-year-old Rastafarian convert was forcibly circumcised by a group of Xhosa tribal elders and relatives. When he first fled, two police returned him to those who had circumcised him. In another case, a medically circumcised Xhosa man was forcibly recircumcised by his father and community leaders. He laid a charge of unfair discrimination on the grounds of his religious beliefs, seeking an apology from his father and the Congress of Traditional Leaders of South Africa. According to South African newspapers, the subsequent trial became "a landmark case around forced circumcision". In October 2009, the Eastern Cape High Court at Bhisho (sitting as an Equality Court) clarified that circumcision is unlawful unless done with the full consent of the initiate.

=== Slovenia ===
The Slovenian Human Rights Ombudsman found in February 2012, after consulting various relevant expert bodies and studying relevant constitutional and legal stipulations, that circumcision for non-medical reasons is a violation of children's rights, that ritual circumcision for religious reasons is unacceptable in Slovenia for both legal and ethical reasons and should not be performed by doctors:

We asked the Higher Academic College for Surgery for professional doctrine in this area (...). The College did not answer all our questions, but sent us the conclusion that circumcision of boys for non-medical reasons is not medically justified.

The Medical Ethics Commission of the Republic of Slovenia sent us a longer response, from which we will summarise its principled opinion, "that ritual circumcision of boys for religious reasons is unacceptable in our country for legal and ethical reasons, and doctors should not perform it". In addition to the unacceptability of circumcision from an ethical point of view, the Commission also emphasises that it is also unacceptable that an already performed procedure is falsely shown as medically indicated in the medical documentation.

We asked the Health Insurance Institute of Slovenia for information on the payment for circumcision (...) which, according to the institute, is EUR 34.88 per treatment. If the intervention is not medically indicated, the service is not covered by health insurance and must be paid for by the patient or their representatives. (...)

It is clear from Article 56 (special protection of children) and Article 35 (inviolability of physical and mental integrity of everyone) of the Slovenian Constitution that any interference with the physical integrity of the child is limited, and can only be justified by medical reasons. (...) However, if the circumcision of a child is not medically indicated, but is only the result of the beliefs of its parents (religious or otherwise), such an intervention has no legal basis. (...) The Patient's Rights Act stipulates that, as a rule, children have the capacity to consent after the age of 15, unless the doctor assesses that they are not capable of doing so based on their maturity. By law, a child under the age of 15 is generally not capable of giving consent, and even in these cases the doctor can assess that it is capable of doing so. The law specifically stipulates that the child's opinion regarding treatment is taken into account to the greatest extent possible, if it is able to express the opinion and if it understands its meaning and consequences.

(...) While parents have some rights to conform their children's education to their religious and ethical beliefs (as long as these do not violate the rights of the children themselves) under Article 41.3 of the Constitution, in our view, the guidelines on religious education do not include the right of parents to decide to interfere with their child's body solely because of their religious beliefs. Therefore, we believe that circumcision for non-medical reasons is not admissible and represents an illegal intervention in the child's body, thereby violating its rights.

— (Slovenia) Slovenian Human Rights Ombudsman

=== Sweden ===
In 2001, the Parliament of Sweden enacted a law allowing only persons certified by the National Board of Health to circumcise infants. It requires a medical doctor or an anesthesia nurse to accompany the circumciser and for anaesthetic to be applied beforehand. After the first two months of life circumcisions can only be performed by a physician. The stated purpose of the law was to increase the safety of the procedure.

Swedish Jews and Muslims objected to the law, and in 2001, the World Jewish Congress called it "the first legal restriction on Jewish religious practice in Europe since the Nazi era". The requirement for an anaesthetic to be administered by a medical professional is a major issue, and the low degree of availability of certified professionals willing to conduct circumcision has also been subject to criticism. According to a survey, two out of three paediatric surgeons said they refuse to perform non-therapeutic circumcision, and less than half of all county councils offer it in their hospitals. However, in 2006, the U.S. State Department stated, in a report on Sweden, that most Jewish mohels had been certified under the law and 3000 Muslim and 40–50 Jewish boys were circumcised each year. An estimated 2000 of these are performed by persons who are neither physicians nor have officially recognised certification.

The Swedish National Board of Health and Welfare reviewed the law in 2005 and recommended that it be maintained, but found that the law had failed with regard to the intended consequence of increasing the safety of circumcisions. A later report by the Board criticised the low level of availability of legal circumcisions, partly due to reluctance among health professionals. To remedy this, the report suggested a new law obliging all county councils to offer non-therapeutic circumcision in their hospitals, but this was later abandoned in favour of a non-binding recommendation.

In January 2014, the Swedish Medical Association (SLF) found no known medical benefits to circumcision of children, and thus strong reasons to wait until the boy is old and mature enough (12 or 13 years old) to give informed consent, aiming at ceasing all non-medically justified circumcision without prior consent:

The issue of circumcision of boys has long been debated both in Sweden and in other countries. The Ethics and Responsibility Council (EAR) believes that the goal is to cease non-medically justified circumcision without prior consent. There are no known medical benefits to the [circumcision] intervention in children. Even if the procedure is performed within the healthcare system, there is, however, a risk of serious complications. Therefore, there are strong reasons to wait for the intervention until the person who is the subject of the measure has reached such age and maturity that he can give informed consent. (...)

— (Sweden) Swedish Medical Association

In October 2018, the right-wing populist Sweden Democrats party submitted a draft motion to parliament calling for a ban. At the annual conference of the Centre Party in September 2019, 314 to 166 commissioners voted in favor of prohibiting boys' circumcision. Several Jewish and Islamic organisations voiced their opposition to a potential ban. The Left Party has also expressed support for a prohibition on circumcising boys before the age of 18; other parties have so far not backed a potential ban, though the Green Party found the practice "problematic".

In favour of a ban

- Sweden Democrats
- Left Party
- Swedish Ombudsman for Children
- Swedish Medical Association

Against a ban

- Christian Democrats
- Liberals
- Moderate Party
- Swedish Social Democratic Party
- Green Party (does find circumcision "problematic")

=== Switzerland ===
According to a July 2012 survey by 20 Minuten involving 8,000 participants, 64% of the Swiss population wanted religious circumcision to be banned. 67% of men and 56% of women were in favour. 93% of Muslim respondents and 75% of Jewish respondents opposed a ban. Over 25% of male respondents were themselves circumcised; 96% of Muslim men and 89% of Jewish men in the survey said they were circumcised, while 20% of circumcised men belonged to neither religion. Almost a third of circumcised men favoured a ban, with 12% wishing in hindsight that they had not been circumcised.

=== United Kingdom ===
Male circumcision has traditionally been presumed to be legal under British law, however some authors have argued that there is no solid foundation for this view in English law.

While legal, the British Medical Association finds it ethically unacceptable to circumcise a child or young person, either with or without competence, who refuses the procedure, irrespective of the parents' wishes, and that parental preference alone does not constitute sufficient grounds for performing NTMC on a child unable to express his own view:

The BMA considers that the evidence concerning health benefit from NTMC (non-therapeutic male circumcision) is insufficient for this alone to be a justification for boys undergoing circumcision. In addition, some of the anticipated health benefits of male circumcision can be realised by other means – for example, condom use. … There are clearly risks inherent in any surgical procedure: for example, pain, bleeding, surgical mishap and complications of anaesthesia. With NTMC there are associated medical and psychological risks … The BMA cannot envisage a situation in which it is ethically acceptable to circumcise a child or young person, either with or without competence, who refuses the procedure, irrespective of the parents' wishes. … Parental preference alone does not constitute sufficient grounds for performing NTMC on a child unable to express his own view. … Furthermore, the harm of a person not having the opportunity to choose not to be circumcised or choose not to follow the traditions of his parents must also be taken into account, together with the damage that can be done to the individual's relationship with his parents and the medical profession, if he feels harmed by an irreversible non-therapeutic procedure.

— (United Kingdom) British Medical Association

The passage of the Human Rights Act 1998 has led to some speculation that the lawfulness of the circumcision of male children is unclear.

One 1999 case, Re "J" (child's religious upbringing and circumcision) said that circumcision in Britain required the consent of all those with parental responsibility (however this comment was not part of the reason for the judgement and therefore is not legally binding), or the permission of the court, acting for the best interests of the child, and issued an order prohibiting the circumcision of a male child of a non-practicing Muslim father and non-practicing Christian mother with custody. The reasoning included evidence that circumcision carried some medical risk; that the operation would be likely to weaken the relationship of the child with his mother, who strongly objected to circumcision without medical necessity; that the child may be subject to ridicule by his peers as the odd one out and that the operation might irreversibly reduce sexual pleasure, by permanently removing some sensory nerves, even though cosmetic foreskin restoration might be possible. The court did not rule out circumcision against the consent of one parent. It cited a hypothetical case of a Jewish mother and an agnostic father with a number of sons, all of whom, by agreement, had been circumcised as infants in accordance with Jewish laws; the parents then have another son who is born after they have separated; the mother wishes him to be circumcised like his brothers; the father for no good reason, refuses his agreement. In such a case, a decision in favour of circumcision was said to be likely.

In 2001 the General Medical Council had found a doctor who had botched circumcision operations guilty of abusing his professional position and that he had acted "inappropriately and irresponsibly", and struck him off the register. A doctor who had referred patients to him, and who had pressured a mother into agreeing to the surgery, was also condemned. He was put on an 18-month period of review and retraining, and was allowed to resume unrestricted practice as a doctor in March 2003, after a committee found that he had complied with conditions it placed on him. According to the Northern Echo, he "told the committee he has now changed his approach to circumcision referrals, accepting that most cases can be treated without the need for surgery".

Fox and Thomson (2005) argue that consent cannot be given for non-therapeutic circumcision. They say there is "no compelling legal authority for the common view that circumcision is lawful". In 2005 a Muslim man had his son circumcised against the wishes of the child's mother who was the custodial parent. In 2009 it was reported that a 20-year-old man whose father had him ritually circumcised as a baby is preparing to sue the doctor who circumcised him. This is believed to be the first time a person who was circumcised as an infant has made a claim in the UK. The case is expected to be heard in 2010. In a 2015 case regarding female circumcision, a judge concluded that non-therapeutic circumcision of male children is a "significant harm". In 2016, the Family Court in Exeter ruled that a Muslim father could not have his two sons (aged 6 and 4) circumcised after their mother disagreed. Mrs Justice Roberts declared that the boys should first grow old enough "to the point where each of the boys themselves will make their individual choices once they have the maturity and insight to appreciate the consequences and longer-term effects of the decisions which they reach".

==== Nottingham case ====
In June 2017, Nottinghamshire Police arrested three people on suspicion of "conspiracy to commit grievous bodily harm". The alleged victim was purportedly circumcised while in his Muslim father's care at his grandparents' in July 2013 without the consent of his mother (a non-religious woman who conceived the child after a casual affair with the man, whom she had separated from after the incident). The mother first contacted social services and eventually the police in November 2014. The police initially dismissed the complaint, but after the mother got help from the anti-circumcision group Men Do Complain and leading human rights lawyer Saimo Chahal QC, they reopened the case, and ended up arresting three suspects involved. In November 2017, the Crown Prosecution Service explained to the mother in a letter they were not going to prosecute the doctor, who claimed he was unaware of the mother's non-consent. However, Chahal appealed this decision, which she said "lacks any semblance of a considered and reasoned decision and is flawed and irrational", and threatened to bring the case to court. The by then 29-year-old mother finally sued the doctor in April 2018. Niall McCrae, mental health expert from King's College London, argued that this case could mean "the end of ritual male circumcision in the UK", drawing comparisons with earlier rulings against female genital mutilation.

=== United States ===
Circumcision of adults who grant personal informed consent for the surgical operation is legal. In the United States, non-therapeutic circumcision of male children has long been assumed to be lawful in every jurisdiction provided that one parent grants surrogate informed consent. Adler (2013) has recently challenged the validity of this assumption. As with every country, doctors who circumcise children must take care that all applicable rules regarding informed consent and safety are satisfied. While anti-circumcision groups have occasionally proposed legislation banning non-therapeutic child circumcision, it has not been supported in any legislature. After a failed attempt to adopt a local ordinance banning circumcision on a San Francisco ballot, the state of California enacted in October 2011 a law protecting circumcision from local attempts to ban the practice. In 2012, New York City required those performing metzitzah b'peh, the oral suction of the open circumcision wound required by Hasidim, to obey stringent consent requirements, including documentation. Agudath Israel of America and other Jewish groups have planned to sue the city in response.

Disputes between parents

Occasionally the courts are asked to make a ruling when parents cannot agree on whether or not to circumcise a child.

In January 2001 a dispute between divorcing parents in New Jersey was resolved when the mother, who sought to have the boy circumcised withdrew her request. The boy had experienced two instances of foreskin inflammation and she wanted to have him circumcised. The father, who had experienced a traumatic circumcision as a child, objected and they turned to the courts for a decision. The Medical Society of New Jersey and the Urological Society of New Jersey both opposed any court ordered medical treatment. As the parties came to an agreement, no precedent was set. In June 2001 a Nevada court settled a dispute over circumcision between two parents but put a strict gag order on the terms of the settlement. In July 2001 a dispute between parents in Kansas over circumcision was resolved when the mother's request to have the infant circumcised was withdrawn. In this case the father opposed circumcision while the mother asserted that not circumcising the child was against her religious beliefs. (The woman's pastor had stated that circumcision was "important" but was not necessary for salvation.) On 24 July 2001 the parents reached agreement that the infant would not be circumcised.

On 14 July 2004 a mother appealed to the Missouri Supreme Court to prevent the circumcision of her son after a county court and the Court of Appeals had denied her a writ of prohibition. However, in early August 2004, before the Supreme Court had given its ruling, the father, who had custody of the boy, had him circumcised.

In October 2006 a judge in Chicago granted an injunction blocking the circumcision of a 9-year-old boy. In granting the injunction the judge stated that "the boy could decide for himself whether to be circumcised when he turns 18."

In November 2007, the Oregon Supreme Court heard arguments from a divorced Oregon couple over the circumcision of their son. The father wanted his son, who turned 13 on 2 March 2008, to be circumcised in accordance with the father's religious views; the child's mother opposes the procedure. The parents dispute whether the boy is in favor of the procedure. A group opposed to circumcision filed briefs in support of the mother's position, while some Jewish groups filed a brief in support of the father. On 25 January 2008, the Court returned the case to the trial court with instructions to determine whether the child agrees or objects to the proposed circumcision. The father appealed to the US Supreme Court to allow him to have his son circumcised but his appeal was rejected. The case then returned to the trial court. When the trial court interviewed the couple's son, now 14 years old, the boy stated that he did not want to be circumcised. This also provided the necessary circumstances to allow the boy to change residence to live with his mother. The boy was not circumcised.

Other disputes

In September 2004 the North Dakota Supreme Court rejected a mother's attempt to prosecute her doctor for circumcising her child without fully informing her of the consequences of the procedure. The judge and jury found that the plaintiffs were adequately informed of possible complications, and the jury further found that it is not incumbent on the doctors to describe every "insignificant" risk. In March 2009 a Fulton County, GA, State Court jury awarded $2.3 million in damages to a 4-year-old boy and his mother for a botched circumcision in which too much tissue was removed causing permanent disfigurement. In August 2010 an eight-day-old boy was circumcised in a Florida hospital against the stated wishes of the parents. The hospital admitted that the boy was circumcised by mistake; the mother has sued the hospital and the doctor involved in the case.

In 2025 and 2026, Intact Global filed two lawsuits, Hadachek v. Oregon and Huff v. Colorado. The lawsuits assert that medically-unnecessary circumcision goes against the equal protection clause in the Constitution of Oregon and the Constitution of Colorado. Both states as well as federal law, ban all forms of female genital mutilation, genital cutting of girls too young to consent. Both states as well as federal law also promise equal protection of people, regardless of gender. Cutting the genitals of a girl in either state would be illegal, the lawsuits state that the plaintiffs were not protected equally by the state because they were allowed to be circumcised as boys.

== See also ==
- Views on circumcision
- Khitan
- Children's rights
- Ethics of circumcision
- Forced circumcision
- Female genital mutilation
- Sexual consent in law

== Sources ==
- Advisory committee on cultural male circumcision (2006). "Report of committee 2004/2005". Ireland: Department of Health and Children. Archived from the original on 1 August 2024.
