= Ethics of circumcision =

Variety of ethical positions on circumcision

Male circumcision is the surgical removal of the foreskin (prepuce) from the human penis.

There is substantial disagreement amongst bioethicists and theologians over the practice of circumcision, with many believing that the routine circumcision of neonates for health purposes is a cost-ineffective and ethically-problematic intervention in developed countries, while circumcision on a consenting adult is generally viewed as a morally permissible action. Positions taken on the issue are heavily influenced by prevalence in the given area, religion, and culture. Some medical associations take the position that circumcision is an infringement of the child's autonomy and should be deferred until they are capable of making the decision themselves. Others state that parents should be allowed to determine what is in their best interest.

== Background ==
There is a long-running and vigorous debate over ethical concerns regarding circumcision, particularly neonatal circumcision for reasons other than intended direct medical benefit. There are three parties involved in the decision to circumcise a minor: the minor as the patient, the parents (or other guardians) and the physician. The physician is bound under the ethical principles of beneficence (promoting well-being) and non-maleficence ("first, do no harm"), and so is charged with the responsibility to promote the best interests of the patient while minimizing unnecessary harms. Those involved must weigh the factors of what is in the best interest of the minor against the potential harms of the procedure. Generally, circumcision on a minor is not ethically controversial or legally questionable when there is a clear and pressing medical indication for which it is the accepted best practice to resolve. Where circumcision is the chosen intervention, the physician has an ethical responsibility to ensure the procedure is performed competently and safely to minimize potential harms.

With a newborn involved, the decision is made more complex due to the principles of respect for autonomy and consent, as a newborn cannot understand or engage in a logical discussion of his own values and best interests. A mentally more mature child can understand the issues involved to some degree, and the physician and parents may elicit input from the child and weigh it appropriately in the decision-making process, although the law may not treat such input as legally informative. Ethicists and legal theorists also state that it is questionable for parents to make a decision for the child that precludes the child from making a different decision for himself later. Such a question can be raised for the decision by the parents either to circumcise or not to circumcise the child.

Parents are assumed to have the child's best interests in mind. Ethically, it is imperative that the medical practitioner inform the parents about the benefits and risks of the procedure and obtain informed consent before performing it. Practically, however, many parents come to a decision about circumcising the child before they are born, and a discussion of the benefits and risks of the procedure with a physician has not been shown to have a significant effect on the decision. Some parents request to have their newborn or older child circumcised for non-therapeutic reasons, such as the parents' desires to adhere to family tradition, cultural norms or religious beliefs. In considering such a request, the physician may consider (in addition to any potential medical benefits and harms) such non-medical factors in determining the child's best interests and may ethically perform the procedure. Equally, without a clear medical benefit relative to the potential harms, a physician may take the ethical position that non-medical factors do not contribute enough as benefits to outweigh the potential harms and refuse to perform the procedure.

The procedure's relationship to other prophylactic procedures, along with the concepts of group rights, consent, and religious freedom, have been discussed in academic literature.

== Medical bodies ==
=== Australia and New Zealand ===
The Royal Australasian College of Physicians (2010) released a statement indicating that neonatal male circumcision is "generally considered an ethical procedure", provided that 1) the child's decision makers, typically the parents, are acting in the best interests of the child and are making an informed decision; and 2) the procedure is performed by a competent provider, with sufficient analgesia, and does not unnecessarily harm the child or have substantial risks. They argue that parents should be allowed to be the primary decision-makers because providers may not understand the full psychosocial benefits of circumcision. Additionally, this procedure does not present substantial harm compared to its potential benefits, so parents should be allowed full decision-making capacity as long as they are educated properly. The statement also establishes that "the option of leaving circumcision until later, when the boy is old enough to make a decision for himself does need to be raised with parents and considered", and that "the ethical merit of this option is that it seeks to respect the child's physical integrity, and capacity for autonomy by leaving the options open for him to make his own autonomous choice in the future."

In 2022, the organization published an updated stance on infant circumcision. In their executive summary, they wrote "The frequency of diseases modifiable by circumcision, the level of protection offered by circumcision and the complication rates of circumcision do not warrant routine infant circumcision in Australia or Aotearoa New Zealand."

=== Canada ===
The Canadian Paediatric Society (CPS) issued a position statement on September 8, 2015, which highlighted the ethical issue surrounding the child's inability to give consent. Since children require a substituted decision maker acting in their best interests, they recommend to hold off non-medically indicated procedures, such as circumcision, until children can make their own decisions. Yet the CPS also states that parents of male newborns must receive unbiased information about neonatal circumcision, so that they can weigh specific risks and benefits of circumcision in the context of their own familial, religious and cultural beliefs.

On January 11, 2024, the Canadian Paediatric Society reaffirmed their 2015 position, stating "While there may be a benefit for some boys in high-risk populations and circumstances where the procedure could be considered for disease reduction or treatment, the Canadian Paediatric Society does not recommend the routine circumcision of every newborn male."

=== Denmark ===
The Danish Medical Association (Lægeforeningen) has released a statement (2016) regarding the circumcision of boys under the age of eighteen years. The organization says that the decision to circumcise should be "an informed personal choice" that men should make for themselves in adulthood. According to Dr. Lise Møller, the chairwoman of the Doctors' Association's Ethics Board, allowing the individual to make this decision himself when he is of age respects his right of self-determination.

The Danish College of General Practitioners has defined non-medical circumcision as mutilation.

=== Netherlands ===
The Royal Dutch Medical Association (Koninklijke Nederlandsche Maatschappij tot bevordering der Geneeskunst) (KNMG) and several Dutch specialist medical societies published a statement of position regarding circumcision of male children on 27 May 2010. The KNMG argues against circumcising male minors due to lack of evidence the procedure is useful or necessary, its associated risks, and violation of the child's autonomy. They recommend deferring circumcision until the child is old enough to decide for himself. The KNMG questions why the ethics regarding male genital alterations should be viewed any differently from female genital alterations, when there are mild forms of female genital alterations like pricking the clitoral hood without removing any tissue or removing the clitoral hood altogether. They have expressed opposition to both male circumcision and all forms of female circumcision; they do not advocate a prohibition of male circumcision, even though they argue that there are good reasons for it to be banned, and prefer that circumcisions be done by doctors instead of illegal, underground circumcisers.

The Dutch Council on Public Health and Care does not agree with the Royal Dutch Medical Association and states that they wrongly do not distinguish between male and female circumcision and that they do not take into account the freedom of religion and the right of parents to raise their children according to their own beliefs or convictions.

=== Nordic countries ===
In 2013, children's ombudsmen from Sweden, Norway, Finland, Denmark, and Iceland, along with the Chair of the Danish Children's Council and the children's spokesperson for Greenland, passed a resolution that emphasized the decision to be circumcised should belong to the individual, who should be able to give informed consent.

The Nordic Association of Clinical Sexologists supports the position of the Nordic Association of Ombudsmen who reason that circumcision violates the individual's human rights by denying the male child his ability to make the decision for himself.

The medical doctors at Sørlandet Hospital Kristiansand in Kristiansand, southern Norway, have all refused to perform circumcisions on boys, citing reasons of conscience.

=== United Kingdom ===
The medical ethics committee of the British Medical Association also reviewed the ethics behind circumcision. Since circumcision has associated risks with, in their view, no unequivocally proven medical benefits, they advise physicians to keep up with clinical evidence and only perform this procedure if it is in the child's best interest. They say the procedure is a cultural and religious practice, which may be an important ritual for the child's incorporation into the group. They recognize that parents have the authority to make choices for their child, and they emphasize it is important for parents to act in their child's best interest. They report that views vary in their community about the benefits and risks of the procedure, and there is no clear policy for this situation.

Commenting on the development of the 2003 British Medical Association guidance on circumcision, Mussell (2004) reports that debate in society is highly polarized, and he attributes it to the different faiths and cultures that make up BMA. He identifies this as a difficulty in achieving consensus within the medical ethics committee. Arguments put forward in discussions, according to Mussell, included the social and cultural benefits of circumcision, the violation of the child's rights, and the violation of the child's autonomy.

==== Adult circumcision ====
In a paper published June 2006, the British Medical Association Committee on Medical Ethics does not consider circumcision of an adult male to be controversial, provided that the adult is of sound mind and grants his personal consent after receiving all material information regarding the known risks, disadvantages, and potential benefits to be derived from the surgical operation.

Circumcision of adults as a public health measure for the purpose of reducing the spread of HIV also involves ethical concerns such as informed consent and concerns about reducing attention paid to other measures. According to the CDC website, research has documented a significant reduction of HIV/AIDS transmission when a male is circumcised.

==== Child circumcision ====
In the same British Medical Association paper, circumcision of a child to treat a clear and present medical indication after a trial of conservative treatment also is not considered to be ethically questionable, provided that a suitable surrogate has granted surrogate consent after receiving all material information regarding the known risks, disadvantages, and potential benefits to be derived from the surgical operation. The BMA 2006 viewpoint called circumcision of neonates and children "increasingly controversial".

==== Criticism and revision of BMA statement ====
The BMA statement of 2003 took the position that non-therapeutic circumcision of children is lawful in the United Kingdom. British law professors Fox and Thomson (2005), citing the House of Lords case of R v Brown, challenged this statement. They argued that consent cannot make an unlawful act lawful. The BMA issued a revised statement in 2006 and now reports the controversy regarding the lawfulness of non-therapeutic child circumcision and recommends that doctors obtain the consent of both parents before performing non-therapeutic circumcision of a male minor. The revised statement now mentions that male circumcision is generally assumed to be lawful provided that it is performed competently, is believed to be in the child's best interests, and there is valid consent from both parents, or the child if capable of expressing a view.

=== United States ===
==== American Academy of Pediatrics ====
The circumcision policy statement of the American Academy of Pediatrics (enacted 2012, expired 2017) stated: "Systematic evaluation of English-language peer-reviewed literature from 1995 through 2010 indicates that preventive health benefits of elective circumcision of male newborns outweigh the risks of the procedure." They wrote that the decision of whether or not to circumcise should be made by parents after considering the medical benefits and risks, along with "religious, ethical, and cultural beliefs and practices", and that the medical benefits are such that third-party payment for circumcision of male newborns is warranted. The policy statement also noted that the risk of complications is considerably lower when circumcision is performed during the newborn period, as opposed to when it is performed later in life. The American College of Obstetricians and Gynecologists had endorsed the American Academy of Pediatrics' circumcision policy statement.

=== Criticism ===
The most recent American Academy of Pediatrics (AAP) position statement on male circumcision (enacted 2012) has attracted critical comment.

In a dissenting paper, Frisch et al. (2013) write: "Circumcision fails to meet the criteria to serve as a preventive measure for UTI ... As a preventive measure for penile cancer, circumcision also fails to meet the criteria for preventive medicine ... circumcision for HIV protection in Western countries fails to meet the criteria for preventive medicine ... Circumcision fails to meet the commonly accepted criteria for the justification of preventive medical procedures in children." Frisch et al. further comment: "The AAP report lacks a serious discussion of the central ethical dilemma with, on one side, parents' right to act in the best interest of the child on the basis of cultural, religious, and health-related beliefs and wishes and, on the other side, infant boys' basic right to physical integrity in the absence of compelling reasons for surgery. Physical integrity is one of the most fundamental and inalienable rights a child has. Physicians and their professional organizations have a professional duty to protect this right, irrespective of the gender of the child."

Van Howe and Svoboda (2013) criticize the AAP's statement because they believed that it failed to include important points, inaccurately analyzed and interpret current medical literature, and made unsupported conclusions.

Frisch et al. (2013) cited the difference of the AAP's statements in comparison to other Western countries, such as Canada, Australia, and various European countries. They attribute this to cultural bias since non-therapeutic male circumcision is prevalent in the United States. They also criticized the strength of the health benefits the statement had claimed, such as protection from HIV and other STIs. The American Academy of Pediatrics responded that because about half of American males are circumcised and half are not, there may be a more tolerant view concerning circumcision in the US, but that if there is any cultural bias among the AAP taskforce who wrote the Circumcision Policy statement, it is much less important than the bias Frisch et al. may hold because of clear prejudices against the practice that can be found in Europe. The AAP then explained why they reached conclusions regarding the health benefits of circumcision that are different from the ones reached by some of their European counterparts.

==== American Medical Association Journal of Ethics ====
In August 2017, the American Medical Association Journal of Ethics featured two separate articles challenging the morality of performing non-therapeutic infant circumcision.

Svoboda argues against non-therapeutic circumcision. He states that this decision should be considered in the context of benefit vs risk of harm, rather than simply risk-benefit due to the non-therapeutic nature of the procedure. He states that benefits do not outweigh the risks, and also claims that foreskin removal should be considered a sexual harm. He also goes on to conclude that non-therapeutic circumcision largely violates the physician's duty to respect a patient's autonomy since many procedures take place before a patient is able to freely give consent himself.

Reis and Reis's article explore the role physicians play in neonatal circumcision. They state that if physicians outline all the currently known risks and benefits of the procedure to the parents and believes the procedure is indeed medically indicated, they cannot be held accountable for any harm from the procedure. They still advise against physicians recommending unnecessary, irreversible surgeries, which is a category circumcision falls in frequently.

== Other views ==
=== JME symposium on circumcision, June 2004 ===
The Journal of Medical Ethics published a "symposium on circumcision" in its June 2004 issue. The symposium published the original version (2003) of the BMA policy statement and six articles by various individuals with a wide spectrum of views on the ethicality of circumcision of male minors. In the introduction, Holm (2004) argues that we do not have the evidence available in order to truly assess the ethics behind circumcision, identifying that we do not have evidence surrounding the "effects of early circumcision on adult sexual function and satisfaction". Therefore, Holm states until this data is available this debate cannot be concluded as there will always be an opposition to circumcision driven by "cultural prejudices".

Hutson (2004) concludes that he does not believe in the risk of circumcision without reason, stating that "no operation should be done if there is no disease". He justifies this through arguing that surgery is only condoned when the risk of the disease is greater than the surgery itself.

Short (2004) disputes Hutson's claims and argues that male circumcision has future prophylactic benefits that make it worthwhile. He concludes that there can be no debate about male circumcision, arguing that "it can bring major improvements to both male and female reproductive health". He believes that as a result of living in a developing world, we have the facilities that enable this surgery to take place without "physical cruel nor potentially dangerous".

Viens (2004) contends that "we do not know in any robust or determinate sense that infant male circumcision is harmful in itself, nor can we say the same with respect to its purported harmful consequences." He suggests that one must distinguish between practices that are grievously harmful and those that enhance a child's cultural or religious identity. He suggests that medical professionals, and bioethicists especially, "must take as their starting point the fact that reasonable people will disagree about what is valuable and what is harmful."

Hellsten (2004) describes arguments in support of circumcision as "rationalisations", and states that infant circumcision can be "clearly condemned as a violation of children's rights whether or not they cause direct pain." He argues that to question the ethical acceptability of the practice, "we need to focus on child rights protection." Hellsten concludes, "Rather, with further education and knowledge the cultural smokescreen around the real reasons for the maintenance of the practice can be overcome in all societies no matter what their cultural background.

Mussell (2004) examined the process by which the BMA arrived at a position on non-therapeutic circumcision male minors, when the organisation had groups and individuals of different ethnicities, religion, culture, and widely varying viewpoints.

Arguments were put forward that non-therapeutic male circumcision is a net benefit for some because it helps them to integrate in the community.

Arguments were also put forward that non-therapeutic male circumcision is a net harm because it is seen as a breach of children's rights—the right of the child to be free from physical intrusion and the right of the child to choose in the future. This argument was given emphasis by Britain's incorporation of the European Convention on Human Rights (1950) into domestic law by the Human Rights Act 1998.

The BMA produced a document that set forth legal and ethical concerns but left the final decision on whether or not to perform a non-therapeutic circumcision to the attending physician.

The last document published by the Journal of Medical Ethics in its symposium on circumcision was a reprint of the BMA statement: "The law and ethics of male circumcision: guidance for doctors (2003).

=== Journal of Medical Ethics circumcision issue, July 2013 ===
The Journal of Medical Ethics devoted the entire July 2013 issue to the controversial issue of non-therapeutic circumcision of male children. The numerous articles represent a diverse variety of views.

=== Other views ===
Povenmire (1988) argues that parents should not have the power to consent to neonatal non-therapeutic circumcision.

Richards (1996) argues that parents only have power to consent to therapeutic procedures.

Somerville (2000) argues that the nature of the medical benefits cited as a justification for infant circumcision are such that the potential medical problems can be avoided or, if they occur, treated in far less invasive ways than circumcision. She states that the removal of healthy genital tissue from a minor should not be subject to parental discretion, or that physicians who perform the procedure are not acting in accordance with their ethical duties to the patient, regardless of parental consent.

Canning (2002) commented that "[i]f circumcision becomes less commonly performed in North America ... the legal system may no longer be able to ignore the conflict between the practice of circumcision and the legal and ethical duties of medical specialists."

Benatar and Benatar (2003) argue that "it is far from obvious that circumcision reduces sexual pleasure," and that "it is far from clear that non-circumcision leaves open a future person's options in every regard." They continue: "It does preserve the option of future circumcised or uncircumcised status. But it makes other options far more difficult to exercise. Transforming from the uncircumcised to the circumcised state will have psychological and other costs for an adult that are absent for a child. ... Nor are these costs 'negligible', .... At the very least, they are not more negligible than the risks and costs of circumcision."

The Committee on Medical Ethics of the British Medical Association (2003) published a paper to guide doctors on the law and ethics of circumcision. It advises medical doctors to proceed on a case by case basis to determine the best interests of the child before deciding to perform a circumcision. The doctor must consider the child's legal and human rights in making his or her determination. It states that a physician has a right to refuse to perform a non-therapeutic circumcision. The College of Physicians and Surgeons of British Columbia took a similar position.

Fox and Thomson (2005) state that in the absence of "unequivocal evidence of medical benefit", it is "ethically inappropriate to subject a child to the acknowledged risks of infant male circumcision." Thus, they believe, "the emerging consensus, whereby parental choice holds sway, appears ethically indefensible".

The Belgian Federal Consultative Committee for Bioethics (Comité Consultatif de Bioéthique de Belgique) (2017), after a three-year study, has ruled that circumcision of male children for non-therapeutic purposes is unethical in Belgium. The process is irreversible, has no medical justification in most cases, and is performed on minors unable to give their own permission, according to the committee. Paul Schotsmans of the University of Leuven, on behalf of the committee, noted "the child's right to physical integrity, which is protected by the International Treaty on the Rights of the Child, and in particular its protection from physical injury." The Belgian minister of health, Maggie De Block, replied that the federal institute for health insurance cannot check and know whether in (individual cases) a circumcision is medically justified or not and that she will continue to reimburse circumcision of minors as the safety of the child is her primary concern and she wants to avoid botched circumcisions by non-medical circumcisers.

In their systematic review, Morris et al (2024) found that (1) arguments against neonatal male circumcision (NMC) are mostly based on low-quality evidence in support of it being high-risk, has little or no health benefit, causes psychological harm, impairs sexual function and pleasure, is unethical, and may be illegal; (2) arguments in favor of NMC are based on evidence that is generally high-quality, showing substantial wide-ranging health benefits, is low-risk, does not cause psychological harm, has no adverse effect on sexual function or pleasure, and is ethical and legal. On balance, the findings presented indicate that parent approved medical NMC and indeed MC at any age, by competent practitioners is ethical and consistent with the right to health. A decline in NMC rates, irrespective of the cause, would increase adverse medical conditions and the burden on healthcare systems. NMC is recognized by major, well-informed health authorities as an important public health intervention that is both ethical and legal.

== HIV prevention ==
The World Health Organization (2007) states that provision of circumcision should be consistent with "medical ethics and human rights principles." They state that "[i]nformed consent, confidentiality and absence of coercion should be assured. ... Parents who are responsible for providing consent, including for the circumcision of male infants, should be given sufficient information regarding the benefits and risks of the procedure in order to determine what is in the best interests of the child." Since babies and children are not sexually active, sexually transmitted HIV infection is not a relevant concern. Critics of non-therapeutic circumcision argue that advocating circumcision to prevent HIV infection may detract from other efforts to prevent the spread of the virus such as using condoms. If the adult chooses to remain celibate or if a couple remain monogamous, or if HIV is eliminated by the time the child is an adult, the sexual reduction surgery would not have been needed. Moreover, they argue that circumcising a child purportedly to partially protect him from HIV infection in adulthood may be seen as granting permission to engage in dangerous sexual practices. Obviously baby boys do not need such protection and can choose for themselves as consenting adults if they want a circumcision. This stance does not take into account the fact that adult men may already have contracted HIV before getting circumcised.

The UK National Health Service (NHS) has stated that the African studies have "important implications for the control of sexually transmitted infections in Africa", but that in the United Kingdom practicing safe sex including condom use is the best way to prevent sexually transmitted disease when having sex.

== Surrogate consent ==
Patient autonomy is an important principle of medical ethics. Some believe that consent for a non-therapeutic operation offends the principle of autonomy, when granted by a surrogate.

Since children, and especially infants, are legally incompetent to grant informed consent for medical or surgical treatment, that consent must be granted by a surrogate—someone designated to act on behalf of the child-patient, if treatment is to occur.

A surrogate's powers to grant consent are more circumscribed than the powers granted to a competent individual acting on his own behalf. A surrogate may only act in the best interests of the patient. A surrogate may not put a child at risk for religious reasons. A surrogate may grant consent for a medical procedure that has no medical indication only if it is the child's best interests.

The attending physician must provide the surrogate with all material information concerning the proposed benefits, risks, advantages, and drawbacks of the proposed treatment or procedure.

=== The Committee on Bioethics of the AAP (1995) states that parents may only grant surrogate informed permission for diagnosis and treatment with the assent of the child whenever appropriate. ===
There is an unresolved question whether surrogates may grant effective consent for non-therapeutic child circumcision. Richards (1996) argues that parents may only consent to medical care, so are not empowered to grant consent for non-therapeutic circumcision of a child because it is not medical care. The Canadian Paediatric Society (2015) recommends that circumcisions done in the absence of a medical indication or for personal reasons "should be deferred until the individual concerned is able to make their own choices."

Regardless of these issues, the general practice of the medical community in the United States is to receive surrogate informed consent or permission from parents or legal guardians for non-therapeutic circumcision of children.

=== Motivations ===
There has been little research into the motivations of parents or guardians. Multiple studies have found whether or not the father is circumcised to be highly correlated or the most correlated. Researchers Lauren Sardi and Kathy Livingston conclude:

"...parents often do not have the ability to give an informed decision but instead rely on a combination of cultural and culturally informed health information to make the decision. If parents lack accurate, up-to-date information regarding the risks of circumcision, this calls into question whether the proxy consent they provide is truly informed."

== See also ==
- Applied ethics
- Brit shalom (naming ceremony)
- Children's rights
- Circumcision and law
- Female genital mutilation
- Medical ethics
- Men's rights
- Prevalence of circumcision
- Violence against men
