= RDMA =

RDMA may refer to:

- Remote direct memory access, in computing
- Radio Disney Music Awards, an annual musical awards ceremony
- Royal Dutch Medical Association, in the Netherlands
