= Brit shalom (naming ceremony) =

Naming ceremony for newborn Jewish boys that does not involve circumcision

Brit shalom (Hebrew: ברית שלום; "Covenant of Peace"), also called alternative brit, brit ben, brit chayim, brit tikkun, or bris in Yiddish and Ashkenazi Hebrew, refers to a range of naming ceremonies for Jewish families that involve rejecting brit milah (the traditional Jewish rite of circumcision).

Brit shalom is recognized by secular Jewish organizations affiliated with Humanistic Judaism like the International Institute for Secular Humanistic Judaism, Congress of Secular Jewish Organizations, Reconstructionist Judaism, and Society for Humanistic Judaism. Reform Judaism encourages adherence to brit milah, although some Reform congregations will allow uncircumcised males to participate in Jewish life. The Reform movement has accepted uncircumcised male converts since 1892, although some individual rabbis have refused to assist in the conversion of those who refuse circumcision. Some Reconstructionist rabbis have also refused to assist in such conversions.

== History ==
In 1892, the Reform Jewish movement stopped requiring circumcision for converts. This was soon followed by the Jewish Religious Union in 1902. The first known brit shalom ceremony was celebrated by Rabbi Sherwin Wine, the founder of the Society for Humanistic Judaism, around 1970.

In 2002, Dr. Mark Reiss opened an online list of rabbis and others who would celebrate brit shalom. It was later moved to its own website.

In 2021, Bruchim, an organisation of Jews advocating for the acceptance of non-circumcision within Judaism, was founded by Lisa Braver Moss and Rebecca Wald. In 2022, Reiss' list was incorporated into the Bruchim website.

== Ceremony ==
There is no universally agreed-upon form of brit shalom. Some involve the washing of the baby's feet, called brit rechitzah. Some Brit shalom ceremonies are performed by a rabbi, others by a lay person.

== Popularity ==
The actual number of brit shalom ceremonies performed per year is unknown. Filmmaker Eli Ungar-Sargon, who is opposed to circumcision, said in 2011, regarding its current popularity, that "calling it a marginal phenomenon would be generous." A survey conducted by the Jewish Journal among mohalim and brit shalom celebrants in the Los Angeles area investigated this claim and found that it is fairly rare. The survey also includes an outlier, Moshe Rothenberg who estimated he's performed 150-200 ceremonies for boys without circumcision. Its popularity in the United States, where it has been promoted by groups, such as Beyond the Bris and Jews Against Circumcision, is increasing, however. Even in Israel, more and more parents choose not to circumcise their sons. In 2018, Reform Rabbi Jonathan Romain said to the Times of Israel that the concept was of increasing interest, especially for interfaith couples.

== Recognition ==
Orthodox Jews consider an intended failure to follow the commandment to circumcise as bringing forth the penalty of kareth, or being "cut off" from the community and from Hashem, as well as being indicative of a conscious decision to cut oneself off from one's people. However, amongst the Orthodox, Jewish identity is defined by matrilineal descent; a child born to a Jewish mother is recognized as Jewish, regardless of their circumcision status.

In Reform Judaism, although refusing circumcision is frowned upon, uncircumcised boys are usually accepted for religious training and bar mitzvah if they are sons of a Jewish parent and have been raised with a Jewish identity.

== See also ==
- Bodily integrity
- Children's rights
- Circumcision controversies
- Ethics of circumcision
