= Royal Dutch Medical Association =

Dutch medical organisation

- Company type: Medical Practitioners
- Industry: Professional Organisation
- Headquarters: Utrecht, Netherlands

The Royal Dutch Medical Association (RDMA; in Dutch Koninklijke Nederlandsche Maatschappij tot bevordering der Geneeskunst or KNMG) is the professional organisation for medical practitioners in the Netherlands. It was founded in 1849.

In 1999 several other medical organisations were integrated into the KNMG, the association of the National Association of salaried Doctors (LAD), the National Association of General Practitioners (LHV), the Dutch Association for Occupational Health (NVAB), the Dutch Association for Nursing Home Physicians (NVVA), the Dutch Association of Insurance Medicine (NVVG), the Dutch Order of Medical Specialists (OMS) and a small group of individual KNMG members. Its membership in 2008 was 40,000 doctors.

== Declarations ==
In 2010, they called male circumcision a harmful and painful ritual that violates children's rights. This announcement was covered internationally over the following years.

== Headquarters ==
Its headquarters is located in Utrecht.

The Association began a library in the field of the history of medicine in the Netherlands in 1849. In 1855, the Association's library collection was loaned to the keeping of the University of Amsterdam. This collection is, for its field, the largest in the world and has a high degree of completeness.
