= American Circumcision =

- The main poster for the film.
- Directed by: Brendon Marotta
- Produced by: Brendon Marotta
- Starring: Marilyn Milos; Georganne Chapin; Andrew Freedman; Edgar Schoen; Brian Morris; Jonathan Conte
- Cinematography: Ben Slavens
- Music by: John Allen Graves
- Production company: BDM
- Distributed by: Netflix; Amazon Prime Video; Target; Walmart; Barnes & Nobles
- Release dates: November 18, 2017 (Fort Worth, Texas)
- Running time: 101 minutes
- Country: United States
- Language: English

American Circumcision is a 2017 documentary film about circumcision and the varying medical, legal, religious, and cultural views on it. The film features a strong focus on the self-named intactivist community and activist Marilyn Milos. It was partially funded on crowdfunding platform Kickstarter and released on Blu-Ray, DVD, and streaming platforms in 2017.

== Summary and Synopsis ==
=== Summary ===
The documentary approaches circumcision from multiple angles through a bodily autonomy lens. The film highlights many interviews in private and outdoors with doctors, parents, circumcised men, and psychologists. The film shows both circumcision proponents and anti-circumcision activists. Also included are circumcision practitioners and self-described circumcision survivors. These interviews vary between being sparingly edited and quickly played against each other. Other sources include news broadcasts, protests, and medical presentations.

=== Synopsis ===
The introduction of the film provides an overview of circumcision, the reasons why it's performed, and circumcision controversies.

Later the interviewees talk openly about the medical, personal, and sexual benefits of foreskin. Brian Morris, a prominent infant circumcision advocate makes his impassioned case for the procedure, largely based on its use to reduce HIV rates and certain cancers such as penile cancer and cervical cancer. Explicit parallels are drawn between circumcision and female genital mutilation.

The film also explains foreskin restoration, showing various restoration devices. Parents and children talk about how circumcision and grief relating to it has hurt them and their family. The circumcision surgical procedure is described in detail and parts of a circumcision on a newborn child are shown. A segment focuses on circumcision opposition within Judaism and the practice of Brit shalom.

Medical professionals, parents, activists, children, and Jewish speakers share how they grow to accept having performed circumcisions or being circumcised. Many of them share that leaning into activism allows them to transmute their regret, fear, grief, and sadness into inspiration to make sure no one else has to experience their pain.

== Reception ==
On review aggregation website Rotten Tomatoes, the film has an approval rating of 60% based on reviews from 5 critics.

The film's topic is inherently controversial and taboo. Some critics lauded it as brave and powerful. Jennie Kermode of Eye For Film said it was "A must for parents-to-be considering this issue...". Others found it overly emotional. Bradley Gibson of Film Threat said that the approach of the film "seeks to cast doubt on scientific evidence the same way religious extremists, UFO believers, or conspiracy theorists would."

Also controversial was the film's emotional and openly biased perspective on a partially medical issue. Kermode claimed "The film doesn't pretend to be objective but it substantiates its medical arguments well.", while Gibson wrote that "...the scientific method takes a beating in all the emotional histrionics."

The film won Best Documentary at the 2017 Lone Star Film Festival in early screenings in Fort Worth.
