= Edgar Schoen =

American pediatric endocrinologist

Edgar J. Schoen (Brooklyn, NY, August 10, 1925 – August 23, 2016) was an American physician who worked as a pediatric endocrinologist at Kaiser Permanente Medical Center in Oakland, California until 2003, and a clinical professor in pediatrics at the University of California, San Francisco until 2004. He chaired the 1988 American Academy of Pediatrics (AAP) Task Force on Circumcision.

== Career ==
Schoen held positions at the Children's Hospital of the East Bay in Oakland and the University of California Medical Center in San Francisco. He was board-certified in pediatrics and pediatric endocrinology, which he practiced in Oakland for 46 years. Schoen was chief of pediatrics at Kaiser Permanente for 24 years.

== Circumcision ==
Schoen maintained Medicirc.org, an online resource in which he discussed what he perceived as the benefits of circumcision. It went offline at the end of 2012. Interviewed in 2000 by the East Bay Express, he stated, "Circumcision is one of the best health insurance policies you can give a son. A circumcised boy has a lifetime advantage over an uncircumcised one."

In a 2007 opinion piece published by The Journal of Men's Health & Gender, Schoen claimed the "protective effect" of neonatal circumcision was equivalent to that of some vaccines and that circumcision "could save millions of lives" as an HIV prophylactic. Schoen dismissed claims that circumcision diminished sexual function as contrary to "recent objective studies" and cited papers that claimed circumcised individuals "had more varied sexual activity" and were preferred as sexual partners by Middle American women. Schoen also speculated that the deaths of Diego Rivera and Eva Perón (from penile cancer and cervical cancer, respectively) could have been avoided if circumcision were more common in their countries.

Schoen wrote about circumcision in the books Ed Schoen, MD on Circumcision (ISBN 1571431233) and Circumcision, Sex, God, and Science: Modern Health Benefits of an Ancient Ritual (ISBN 978-1-4392-1910-2) as well as poetry on the topic in the American Journal of Diseases in Children.

In a 1999 Boston Globe article, Schoen said, concerning the AAP's decision to not advocate circumcision, "It's highly biased". The 1989 report he oversaw stated that circumcision reduced the risks of urinary tract infections and sexually transmitted diseases. In 2017, Schoen appeared posthumously in the documentary film American Circumcision, in which he stated neonatal circumcision had worthwhile benefits and advocated for anesthesia during the surgical procedure.
