= Foreskin restoration =

Process to expand skin on the penis

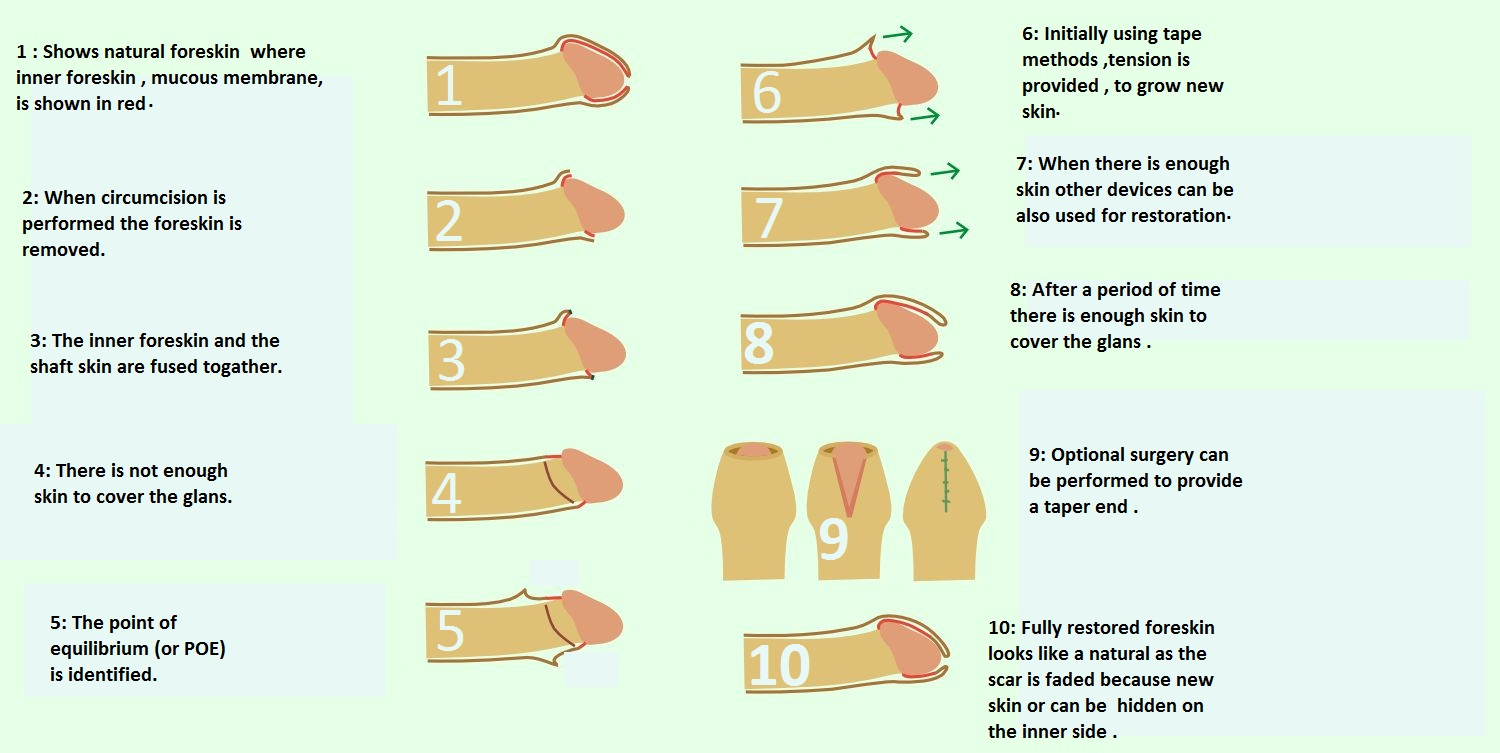
Stages of non-surgical restoration

Foreskin restoration or foreskin reconstruction refers to the process of recreating the foreskin of the penis, which has been removed by circumcision or injury. Foreskin restoration is primarily accomplished by gently tugging the skin of the penis by hand or with a restoration device to stimulate the production of more skin through tissue expansion, but surgical methods also exist. Restoration creates a functional foreskin, but specialized tissues removed during circumcision such as the preputial orifice cannot be regrown.

== History ==
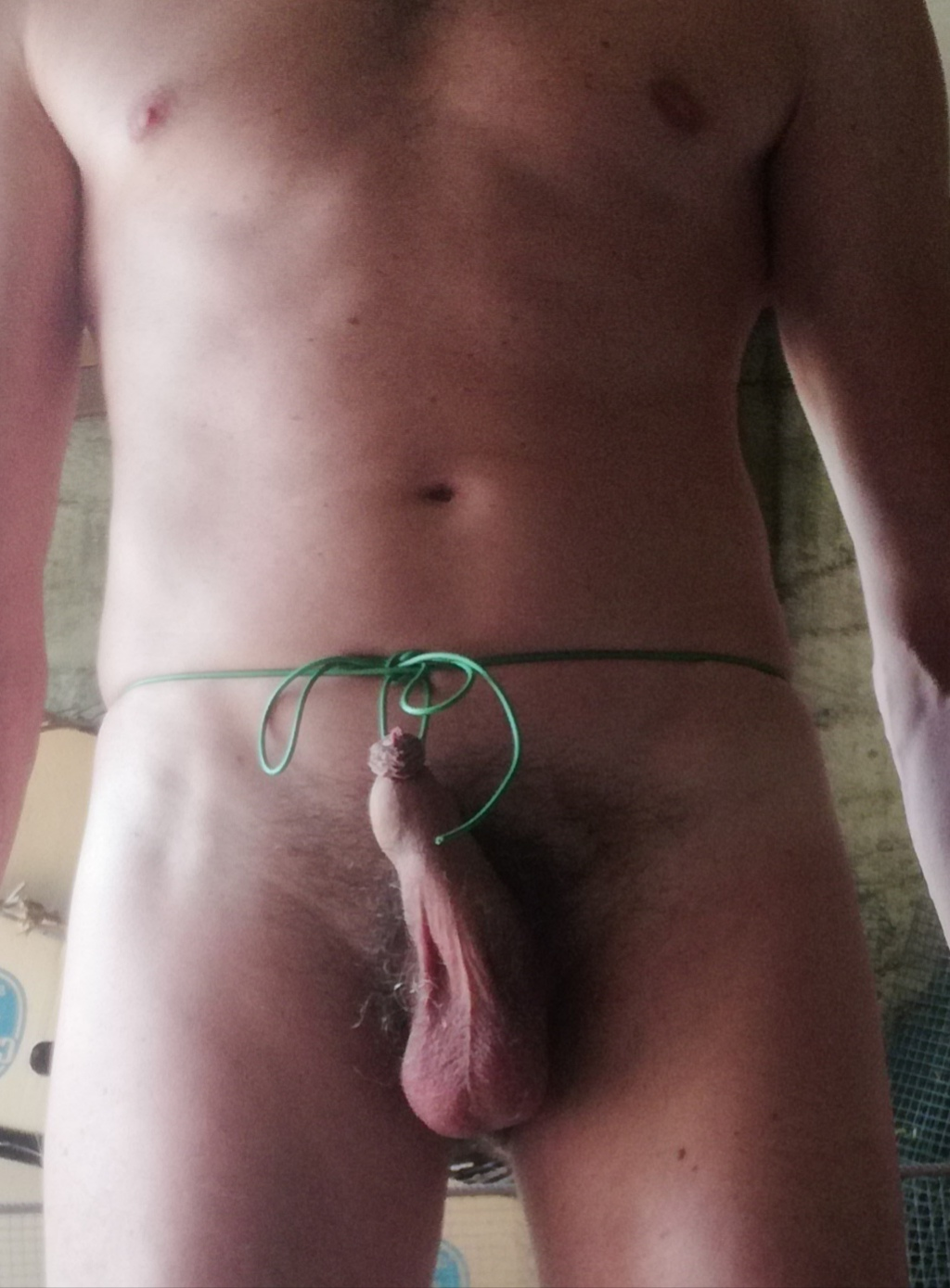
A kynodesme in use.

In the Greco-Roman world, intact genitals, including the foreskin, were considered a sign of beauty, civility, and masculinity. In Classical Greek and Roman societies (8th century BCE to 6th century CE, exposure of the glans was considered disgusting and improper, and did not conform to the Hellenistic ideal of gymnastic nudity. Men with short foreskins would wear the kynodesme to prevent exposure and potentially permanently lengthen the foreskin. As a consequence of this social stigma, an early form of foreskin restoration known as epispasm was practiced among some Jews in Ancient Rome (8th century BCE to 5th century CE). The history of foreskin restoration changed the practice of circumcision itself. Jewish religious leaders were upset that circumcision was being undone and changed the practice to remove significantly more skin in an attempt to make restoration more difficult.

Foreskin restoration is of ancient origin. Hellenized Jews stopped circumcising their sons to avoid persecution and so they could participate in the gymnasium. Some Jews at this time attempted to restore their foreskins, which caused conflict within Second Temple Judaism, some Jews viewed circumcision as an essential part of the Jewish identity (1 Maccabees 1:15). Following the death of Alexander, Judea and the Levant was part of the Seleucid Empire under Antiochus Epiphanes (175-164 BCE). Antiochus outlawed the Jewish practice of circumcision, both 1st and 2nd Maccabees records Jewish mothers being put to death for circumcising their sons (1:60-61 and 6:10 respectively). Some Jews during Antiochus' persecution sought to undo their circumcision. Within the 1st century C.E., there were still some forms of foreskin restoration being sought after (1 Corinthians 7:18). During the third Jewish-Roman Wars (CE 132–135), the Romans had renamed Jerusalem as Aelia Capitolina and may have banned circumcision; however, Roman sources from the period only mention castration and say nothing about banning circumcision. According to rabbinic sources, during the Bar Kokhba revolt, Jews who had engaged in foreskin restoration were recircumcised (either voluntarily or by force). Again, during World War II, some European Jews sought foreskin restoration to avoid Nazi persecution.

Foreskin restoration is featured prominently in the 2017 documentary American Circumcision. In the film, Ron Low, a device inventor, estimates a quarter million people worldwide were restoring in 2010.

== Non-surgical techniques ==
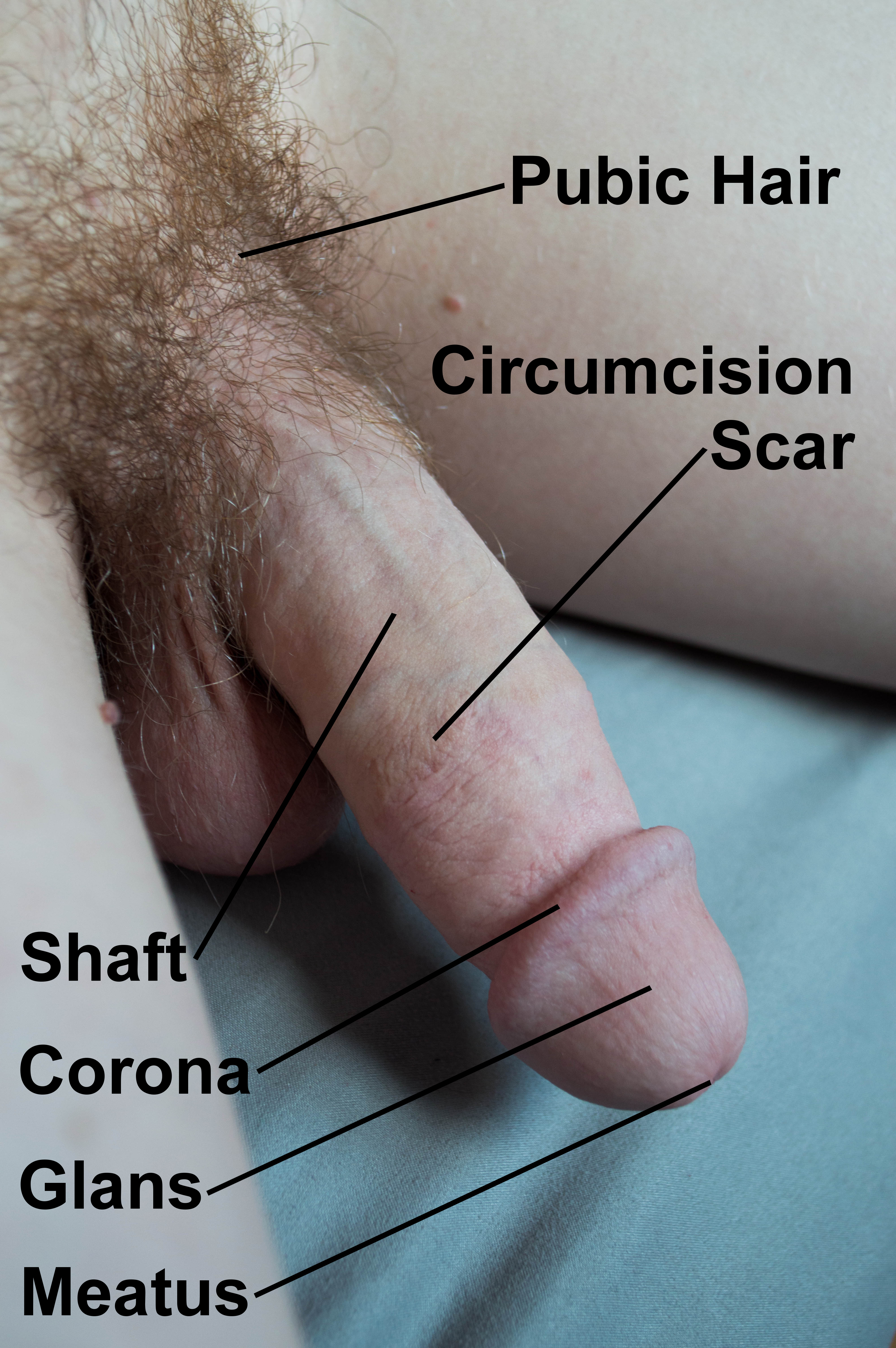
A circumcised penis. The process of foreskin restoration intends to create more inner (skin below the scarline) and outer skin (skin above the scarline) to cover the glans.

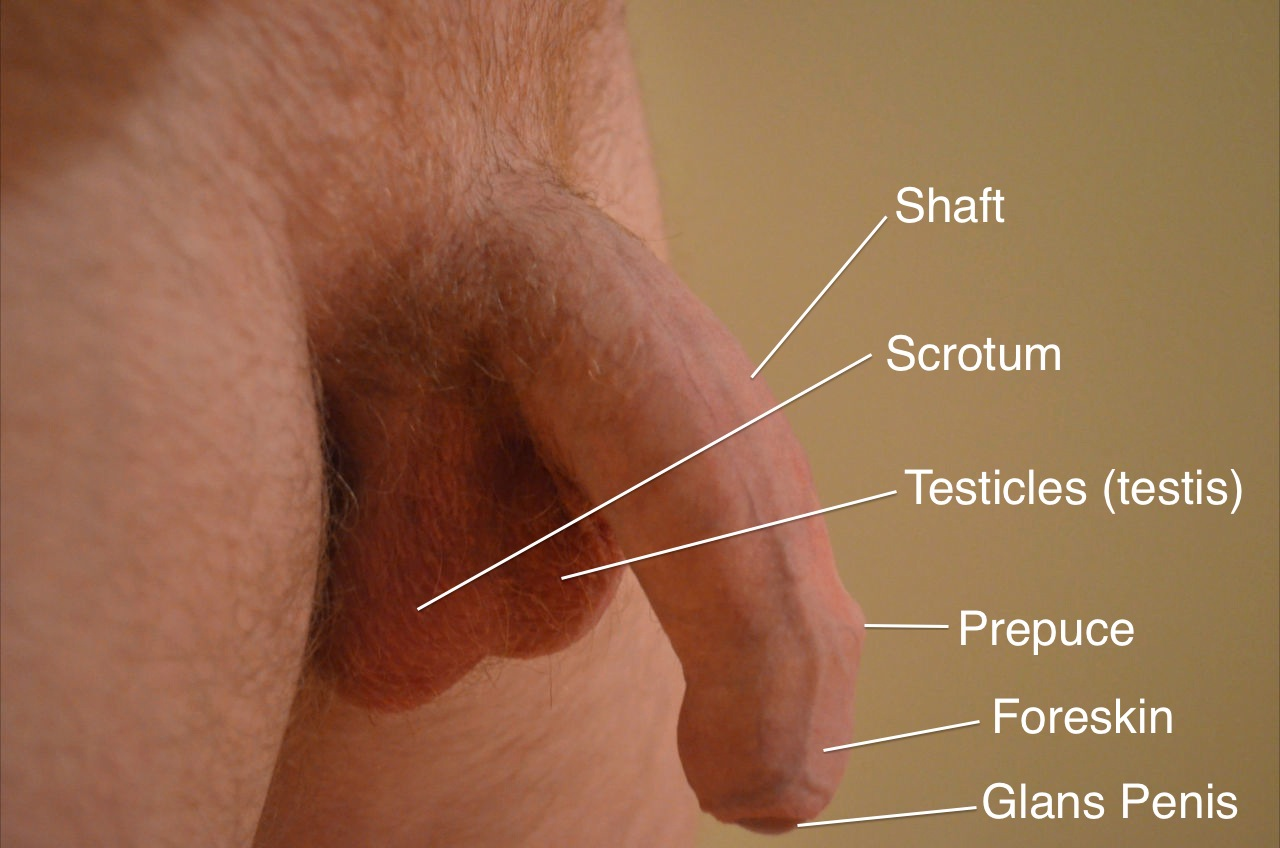
A flaccid penis that has not been circumcised, showing the foreskin protecting the glans.

=== Tissue expansion ===
Non-surgical foreskin restoration, accomplished through tissue expansion, is the most commonly used method. Manual and device-assisted restoration is effective but remains poorly researched.

Tissue expansion has long been known to stimulate mitosis, and research shows that regenerated human tissues have the attributes of the original tissue.

Care must be taken not to injure or tear the skin. Applying tension to different parts of the skin can change the overall physical shape. This allows the restorer to change the ratio of outer skin to inner skin. Partial restoration can allow cosmetic and functional improvements in the case of circumcision complications such as uneven or excessive skin removal.

==== Methods and devices ====
There are multiple restoration methods, in the most common one the remaining penile skin is pulled forward over the glans, and tension is maintained either by hand or through the aid of a foreskin restoration device. These may be complex handmade devices or simple multi-purpose tools such as cohesive bandage. The process slowly creates more skin, allowing more coverage and protection of the glans even when tension is removed.

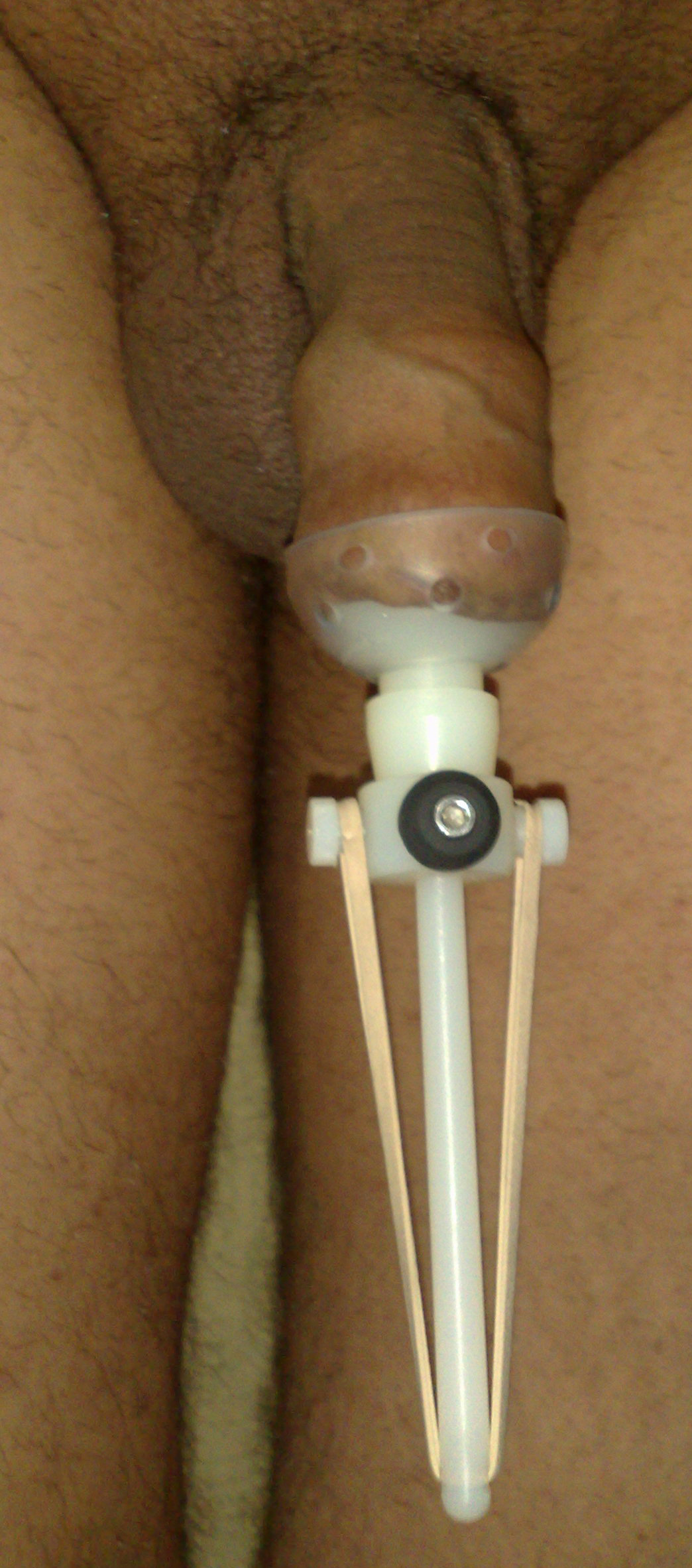
Dual tension restorer applied to a circumcised penis for non-surgical foreskin restoration

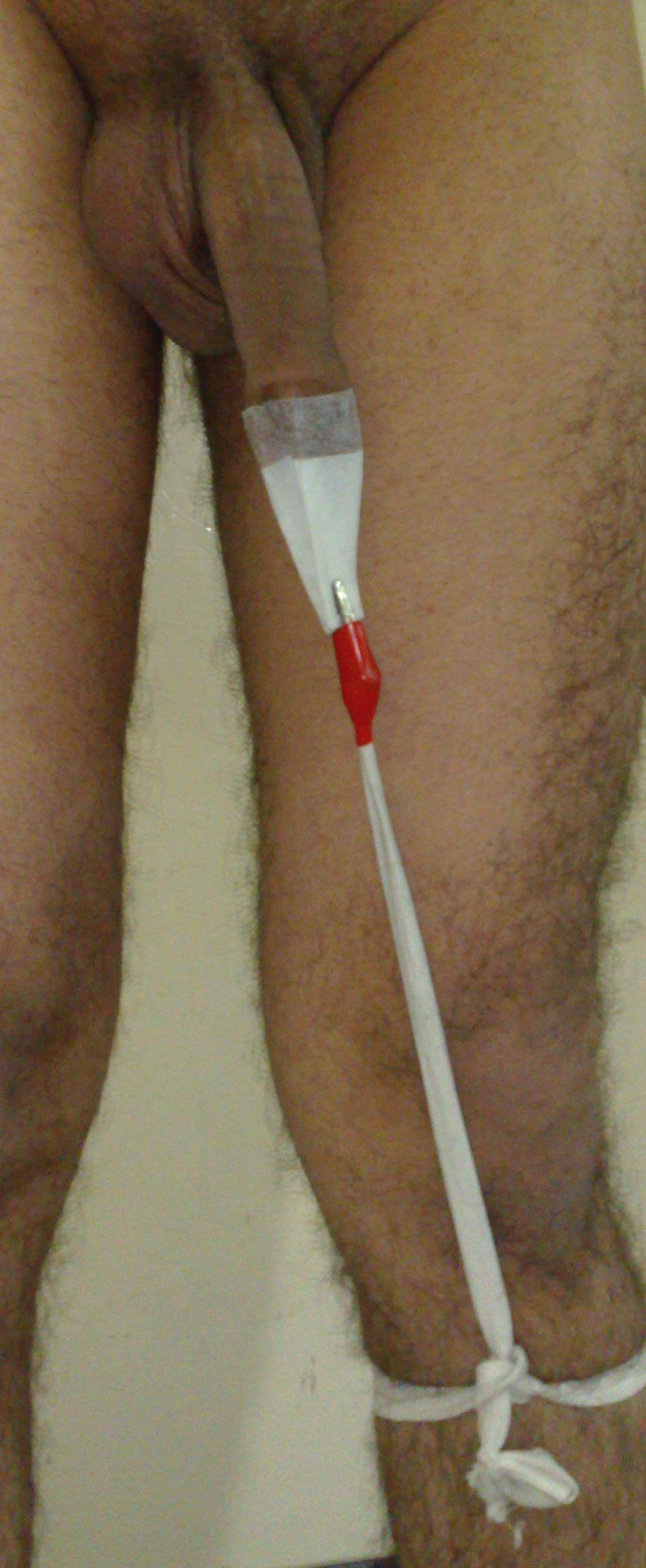
T-tape with a leg strap

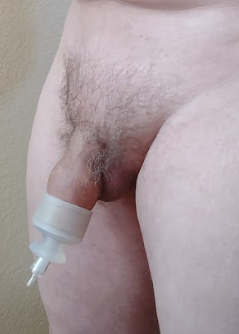
Silicone device with a one-way valve that allows air to be pumped to inflate and expand the foreskin

Application of a typical restoration device, the TugAhoy, called a 'Chinese puzzle' by its inventor

== Surgical techniques ==
=== Foreskin reconstruction ===
Surgical methods of foreskin restoration, known as foreskin reconstruction, usually involve grafting skin onto the distal portion of the penile shaft. The grafted skin is typically taken from the scrotum, which contains the same smooth muscle (known as dartos fascia) as the skin of the penis. One method involves a four-stage procedure in which the penile shaft is buried in the scrotum for a period of time.

== Reasons ==
Surgical foreskin reconstruction may be offered to people who have significant anatomy differences due to being intersex as well as people who are simply unhappy with being circumcised. In 2023, a survey of people restoring found the most common reasons people undergo the process are "Increased glans sensitivity", "enhanced sexual pleasure", and "protecting the glans from the outer environment".

== Results ==
=== Physical aspects ===
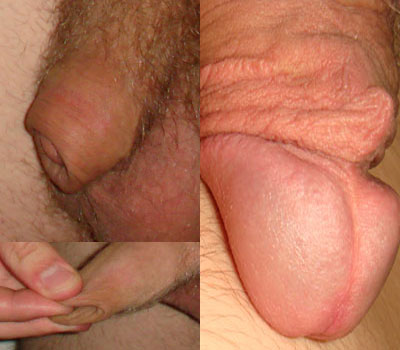
A partially restored foreskin after four years of non-surgical restoration. The bottom left image shows a manual tugging technique.

Restoration creates a functional facsimile of the prepuce, but specialized tissues removed during circumcision such as the preputial orifice, the ridged band, and the frenulum cannot be regrown. Surgical procedures exist to reduce the size of the opening once restoration is complete (as depicted in the image above), or it can be alleviated through a longer commitment to the skin expansion regimen to allow more skin to collect at the tip.

The natural foreskin is composed of smooth dartos muscle tissue (called the peripenic muscle), large blood vessels, extensive innervation, outer skin, and inner mucosa.

The process of foreskin restoration seeks to regenerate some of the tissue removed by circumcision, as well as provide coverage of the glans. According to research, the foreskin comprises over half of the skin and mucosa of the human penis.

In a survey of foreskin restorers (the results of which were published in March 2023), 69 percent of respondents reported increased sexual pleasure and 25 percent reported improved relationships.

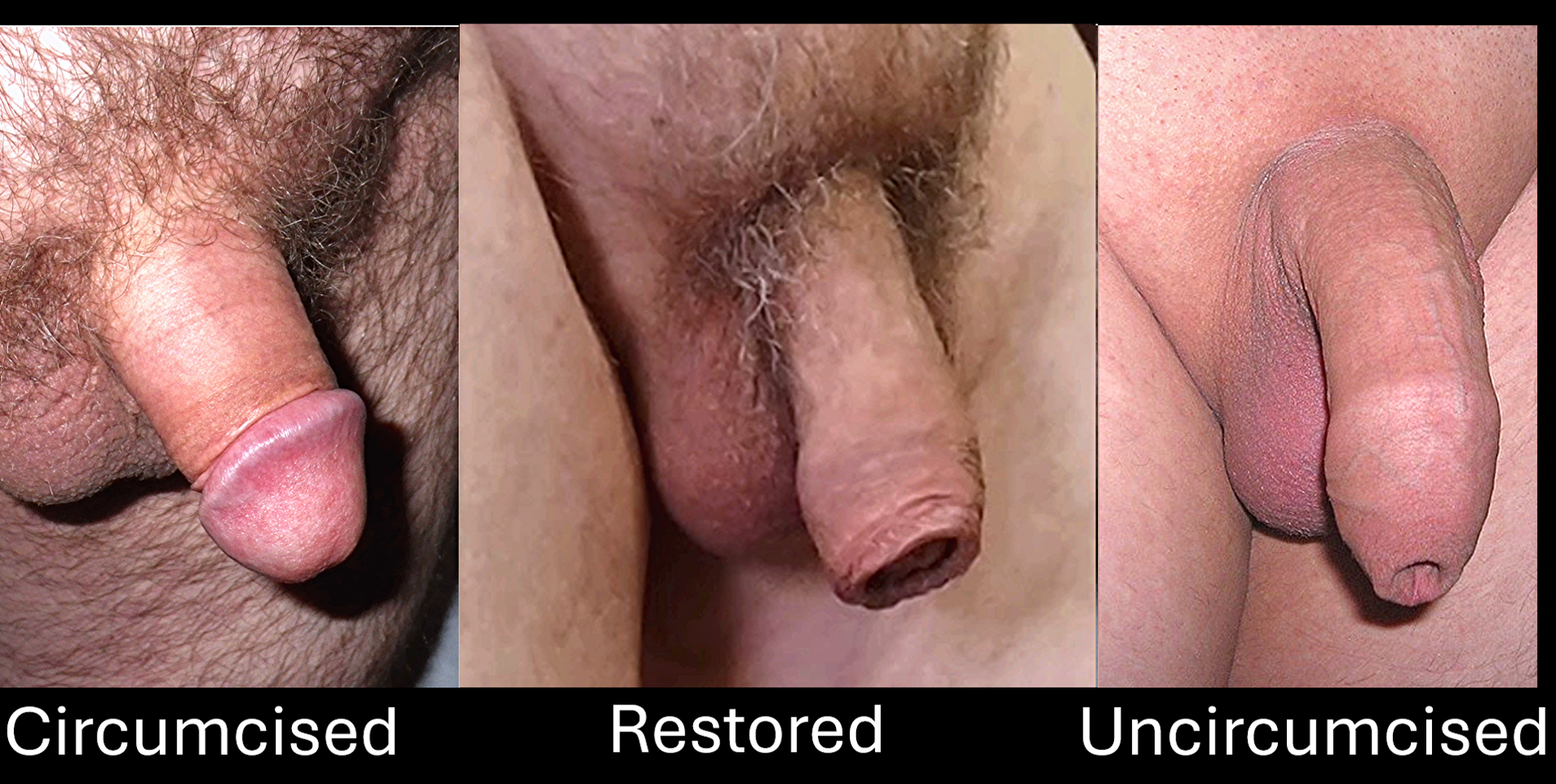
(left) Circumcised, (middle) restored foreskin, (right) uncircumcised

== Organizations ==
Various groups have been founded since the late 20th century, especially in North America where circumcision has been routinely performed on infants. In 1989, the National Organization of Restoring Men (NORM) was founded as a non-profit support group for men undertaking foreskin restoration. In 1991, the group UNCircumcising Information and Resource Centers (UNCIRC) was formed, which was incorporated into NORM in 1994. NORM chapters have been founded throughout the United States, as well as in Canada, the United Kingdom, Australia, New Zealand, and Germany. In France, there are at least two associations. The "Association contre la Mutilation des Enfants" AME (association against child mutilation), and more recently "Droit au Corps" (right to the body).

== See also ==
- Circumcision controversies
- Intactivism
- Regeneration in humans
- Restoration device
- Tissue expansion
- Circumcision controversy in early Christianity
- Fibula (penile)
