= Restoration device =

Device to apply tension to the skin

Application of a typical restoration device, the TugAhoy, called a "Chinese puzzle" by its inventor.

A restoration device is a device used for applying tension to skin during the process of non-surgical foreskin restoration. Those who use such a device employ the use of tissue expansion, which causes new skin to grow. Not all people who are restoring use a dedicated device, some use self-adhesive bandages, silicone o-rings, or exclusively stimulate growth by hand.

== History ==
Until the 2nd century CE, the Pondus Judaeus was used among some circumcised males. It was a replacement for more painful techniques known at the time. This device was a bronze sheath used to expand the foreskin, which at the time was not fully excised. Its effectiveness became limited after circumcisions were modified to eliminate its use (Tushmet 1965).

During the late 20th century and early 21st century, new techniques were developed to suit the needs of men circumcised by physicians in North America. These circumcisions often left little movable skin on the penile shaft, and this was taken into consideration by developers of restoration techniques. Some devices have been designed to require little skin to be usable. During the 1990s, the process of foreskin restoration employed adhesive tape, such as tapes used in hospitals or for athletics, to pull skin forward or attach weights and pulling devices to provide tension.

== Function ==
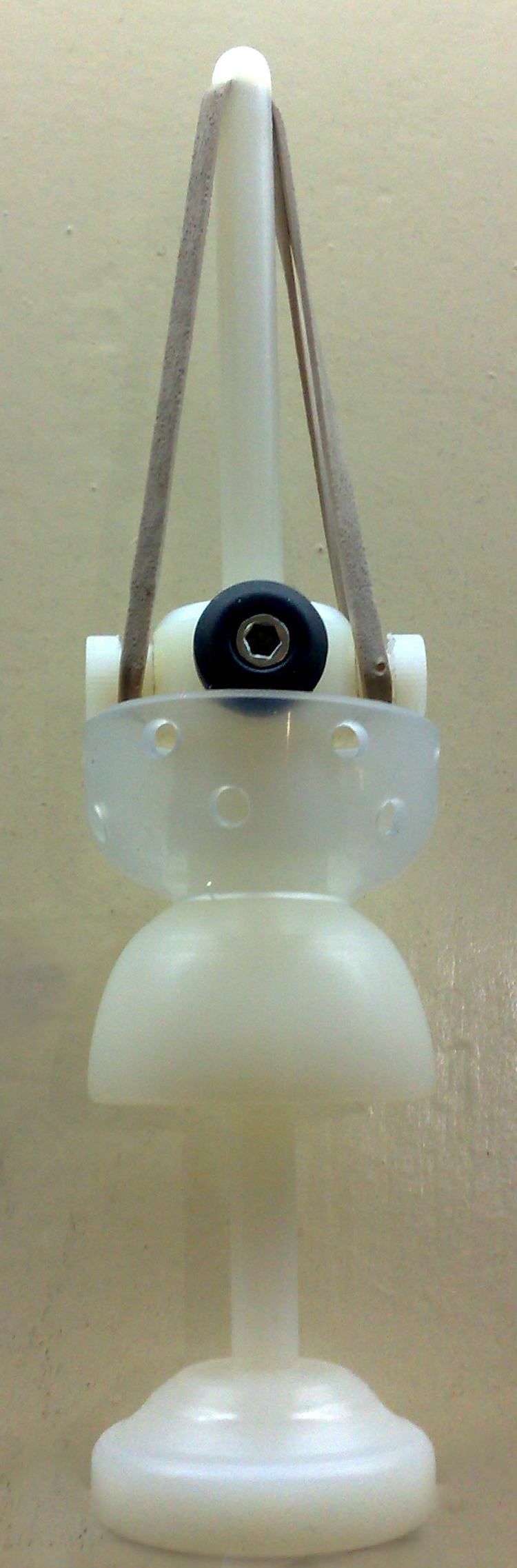
DTR shown, nylonbell with pusher plate, a rubber band to provide bi-directional tension and silicone gripper to hold the foreskin in place.

The following steps describe the application of a typical tapeless device:

- a device, such as cone or plastic shell, is placed over the glans
- skin is then pulled onto the device
- the skin is covered with a flexible gripping cap
- tension is applied by pulling the device

The following steps describe the application of a typical device in which tape is needed:

- a device, such as a cone, bell or shell, is placed over the glans
- skin is pulled onto the device
- then tape is applied to keep the skin in place
- the device is then pulled using a rubber band or has a weight with it to apply tension .

== Modern devices ==
Older methods have been partially replaced by the use of various plastic or silicone components. The entire design and function of the “modern” devices was first described in the 2003 Foreskin Restoration Device patent by the inventor of the Tug Ahoy. Many new devices grip the skin, usually without the use of tape. Some devices are homemade, often designed by men whose skin is easily irritated by adhesive tapes. There are several different varieties of tapeless restoration devices commercially available. Some silicone devices have an opening for a one-way air valve and a hand pump for inflating the foreskin. This expands the foreskin from within, creating skin tension and growth.

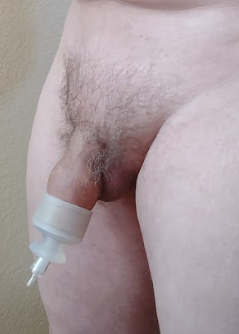
Silicon device with one-way air valve, inflating the foreskin from inside.

Most devices are equipped with an elastic band or some type of tension adjustment to pull the skin away from the glans. As the tension is applied, the natural process of mitosis is stimulated.

Some restoration devices are more comfortable or more effective than others. In some cases where there is too little skin to pull onto the gripping surface, pressure must be applied to the glans when applying the device. Most devices and weights are easily washed and can be reused each day.

== Retainer ==
The function of a foreskin retainer is to keep the glans penis covered by the available foreskin. A foreskin retainer can be used when newly grown foreskin is neither long enough nor tight enough to keep the glans covered itself, but is long enough that it can be stretched past the glans (which is necessary to facilitate the use of a retainer). Rubber bands, o-rings, Band-Aids, and cones with both ends open can be used as retainers.

The foreskin can also be retained with a medical adhesive, known as MRS. MRS is a silicone based skin safe adhesive. MRS originally stood for Miracle Restoration Spray, but is now available in a brushable form. A small amount of adhesive is applied to the glans, and the skin is rolled up and retained by the MRS. MRS sets up almost instantly, but the skin can still be pulled back if necessary.

== See also ==
- Circumcision
