= Brian Morris (biologist) =

Australian molecular biologist (born 1950)

Brian J. Morris
- Born: 14 July 1950 (age 76); Adelaide, Australia
- Education: University of Adelaide, Monash University, University of Melbourne
- Known for: Work on the renin-angiotensin system, hypertension, circumcision
- Awards: Royal Society of New South Wales' Edgeworth David Medal (1985)
- Scientific career
- Fields: Molecular biology, molecular genetics
- Workplaces: University of Sydney
- Thesis: The renin-angiotensin system in kidney cells (1975)

Brian James Morris is an Australian molecular biologist and medical researcher known for his work in the fields of hypertension, molecular genetics, and the development of medical technologies. He is a professor emeritus at the University of Sydney and has had a distinguished career in academic research, teaching, and clinical innovations. His work has led to contributions to medical science, including the invention of the first polymerase chain reaction (PCR) test for viral detection, which he patented and applied to human papillomavirus (HPV) screening for cervical cancer prevention. As well, his strong advocacy for, and extensive publications on, the health benefits of male circumcision.

== Education ==
Morris grew up in Adelaide, South Australia, where he graduated from the University of Adelaide in 1972. He then completed his PhD at Monash University and the University of Melbourne in 1975. From 1975 to 1978 he did postdoctoral research at the University of Missouri, and the University of California, San Francisco, first as a CJ Martin fellow, and then as an Advanced Fellow of the American Heart Association.

== Career ==
Morris was appointed as a lecturer at the University of Sydney in 1978 and advanced through the academic ranks, becoming a professor of Molecular Medical Sciences in 1999. In 2013, he was appointed professor emeritus at the University of Sydney. He has also served in various leadership roles within the university, including mentoring postgraduate students and overseeing research projects. He retired, with appointment to professor emeritus taking effect in January, 2014. In 2017, Morris starred as a prominent figure in the documentary film, American Circumcision sharing his views on male circumcision and female genital mutilation.

== Research ==
Morris is best known for his invention of the first PCR-based test for viral detection.

His work in this area led to the development of a more accurate and effective method for identifying human papillomavirus (HPV) infections, which are known to cause most cervical cancers. His work, patented in the late 1980s, was later incorporated into national screening programs globally, including the Australian National Cervical Screening Program, which transitioned to HPV testing in 2017.

Morris has made contributions to the understanding of molecular genetics and its application in medicine. His research has focused on hypertension, molecular biology, genetics, and cancer prevention, with a particular emphasis on cardiovascular health and the molecular mechanisms underlying disease.

Morris studied the Renin–angiotensin system (RAS) for most of his career. His interest in the RAS began during his undergraduate studies, when he worked for a while in the laboratory where Eugenie Lumbers had just found early clues to the existence of prorenin (the protein precursor of renin) during her PhD work. He remained interested in the field, and had the good fortune to move to the University of California, San Francisco in the mid-1970s, a centre for the development of the tools of biotechnology and molecular cloning. He joined others in applying those tools to RAS, and was among the pioneers is isolating the gene for renin itself, along with the prorenin and kallikrein genes, and the cardiac myosin heavy chain gene.

He and his team were among first to elucidate the biosynthetic pathway of renin, as well as key molecular mechanisms in renin's transcriptional and posttranscriptional control. Taking that work further, he helped pioneer the field of genetic variation in hypertension.

Morris has been active in the public debate around circumcision. He has described medical organisations, such as the Royal Australasian College of Surgeons, who are not in favour of routine non-therapeutic circumcision, as like anti-vaccination advocates. He has, however, also remarked that parents should "weigh up all of the pros and cons for themselves and make their own best decision".

In the 2000s, he began to study the genetics of longevity, including the roles of FOXO3 and the sirtuins.

Morris has been a principal investigator and co-investigator on numerous research grants, including a significant US$15 million NIH Centre of Excellence grant for which he has led publication output since 2012. Morris has been a frequent contributor to national and international media on issues related to public health. He has appeared on TV and radio programs, including interviews on Australia's "60 Minutes" and several US television networks.

== Awards and honours ==
He was awarded the Royal Society of New South Wales' Edgeworth David Medal in 1985 and in 1993 the University of Sydney awarded him a DSc. In 2003 he was elected as an Honorary Fellow of the American Heart Association Council for High Blood Pressure Research. In 2010 he gave the Lewis K. Dahl Memorial lecture, an award sponsored by the Council for High Blood Pressure Research in association with the American Heart Association. In 2014 the AHA awarded him the Irvine Page—Alva Bradley Lifetime Achievement Award. He was made a Member of the Order of Australia in the Queens Birthday Honours Awards in 2018. He received The Paul Korner Senior Scientist Award (2023) from the High Blood Pressure Research Council of Australia and Paul Dudley White International Scholar Award (2023) from the American Heart Association's Council on Hypertension.

== Selected publications ==
- Morris, Brian J.; Lumbers, Eugenie R. (1972). "The activation of renin in human amniotic fluid by proteolytic enzymes". Biochimica et Biophysica Acta (BBA) - Enzymology. 289 (2): 385–391. doi:10.1016/0005-2744(72)90090-3. ISSN 0005-2744. PMID 4568061.
- Morris, B J.; Johnston, C I. (15 March 1976). "Renin substrate in granules from rat kidney cortex". Biochemical Journal. 154 (3): 625–637. doi:10.1042/bj1540625. ISSN 0264-6021. PMC 1172764. PMID 182123.
- Catanzaro, D F; Mullins, J J; Morris, B J (1983). "The biosynthetic pathway of renin in mouse submandibular gland". Journal of Biological Chemistry. 258 (12): 7364–7368. doi:10.1016/s0021-9258(18)32187-2. ISSN 0021-9258. PMID 6190801.
- HARDMAN, JUDY A.; HORT, YVONNE J.; CATANZARO, DANIEL F.; TELLAM, JUDY T.; BAXTER, JOHN D.; MORRIS, BRIAN J.; SHINE, JOHN (1984). "Primary Structure of the Human Renin Gene". DNA. 3 (6): 457–468. doi:10.1089/dna.1.1984.3.457. ISSN 0198-0238. PMID 6391881.
- Morris, Brian J.; Rose, Barbara R.; Flanagan, Judith L.; McKinnon, Kay J.; Loo, Cheen Y.; Thompson, Carol H.; Flampoulidou, Mary; Ford, Robert M.; Hunter, J. Christopher; Nightingale, Brian N.; Cossart, Yvonne E. (1990). "Automated polymerase chain reaction for papillomavirus screening of cervicovaginal lavages: Comparison with dot-blot hybridization in a sexually transmitted diseases clinic population". Journal of Medical Virology. 32 (1): 22–30. doi:10.1002/jmv.1890320105. ISSN 0146-6615. PMID 2173735.
- Morris, B J; Zee, R Y; Schrader, A P (1 September 1994). "Different frequencies of angiotensin-converting enzyme genotypes in older hypertensive individuals". Journal of Clinical Investigation. 94 (3): 1085–1089. doi:10.1172/jci117423. ISSN 0021-9738. PMC 295169. PMID 8083349.
- Morris, Brian J; Hilmer, Sarah N; Brand-Miller, Jennie C; Jamieson, Hamish A; Truswell, A Stewart; Sharma, Anita P; Mason, Rebecca S; Everitt, Arthur V; Couteur, David G Le (2006). "Dietary approaches that delay age-related diseases". Clinical Interventions in Aging. 1 (1): 11–31. doi:10.2147/ciia.2006.1.1.11. ISSN 1176-9092. PMC 2682451. PMID 18047254.
- Helena Mangs, A.; Morris, Brian (1 April 2007). "The Human Pseudoautosomal Region (PAR): Origin, Function and Future". Current Genomics. 8 (2): 129–136. doi:10.2174/138920207780368141. ISSN 1389-2029. PMC 2435358. PMID 18660847.
- Marques, Francine Z.; Markus, M. Andrea; Morris, Brian J. (2009). "Resveratrol: Cellular actions of a potent natural chemical that confers a diversity of health benefits". The International Journal of Biochemistry & Cell Biology. 41 (11): 2125–2128. doi:10.1016/j.biocel.2009.06.003. ISSN 1357-2725. PMID 19527796.
- Marques, Francine Z.; Campain, Anna E.; Tomaszewski, Maciej; Zukowska-Szczechowska, Ewa; Yang, Yee Hwa J.; Charchar, Fadi J.; Morris, Brian J. (2011). "Gene Expression Profiling Reveals Renin mRNA Overexpression in Human Hypertensive Kidneys and a Role for MicroRNAs". Hypertension. 58 (6): 1093–1098. doi:10.1161/hypertensionaha.111.180729. ISSN 0194-911X. PMID 22042811.
- Morris, Brian J. (2013). "Seven sirtuins for seven deadly diseases ofaging". Free Radical Biology and Medicine. 56: 133–171. doi:10.1016/j.freeradbiomed.2012.10.525. ISSN 0891-5849. PMID 23104101.
- Morris, Brian J. (2015). "Renin, Genes, MicroRNAs, and Renal Mechanisms Involved in Hypertension". Hypertension. 65 (5): 956–962. doi:10.1161/hypertensionaha.114.04366. ISSN 0194-911X. PMID 25601934.
- Morris, Brian J; Hankins, Catherine A (2017). "Effect of male circumcision on risk of sexually transmitted infections and cervical cancer in women". The Lancet Global Health. 5 (11): e1054–e1055. doi:10.1016/s2214-109x(17)30386-8. ISSN 2214-109X. PMID 29025620.
- Morris, Brian J.; Willcox, Bradley J.; Donlon, Timothy A. (2019). "Genetic and epigenetic regulation of human aging and longevity". Biochimica et Biophysica Acta (BBA) - Molecular Basis of Disease. 1865 (7): 1718–1744. doi:10.1016/j.bbadis.2018.08.039. ISSN 0925-4439. PMC 7295568. PMID 31109447.
- Morris, Brian J.; Wiswell, Thomas E. (2023). "Circumcision and Lifetime Risk of Urinary Tract Infection: A Systematic Review and Meta-Analysis". Journal of Urology. 189 (6): 2118–2124. doi:10.1016/j.juro.2012.11.114. ISSN 0022-5347. PMID 23201382.
