= Tissue expansion =

Medical technique to grow tissues

- MeSH: D015626

Tissue expansion is a technique used by plastic, maxillofacial and reconstructive surgeons to cause the body to grow additional skin, bone, or other tissues. Other biological phenomena such as tissue inflammation can also be considered expansion (see tissue inflammation below).

== Skin expansion ==
Skin expansion is a common surgical procedure to grow extra skin through controlled mechanical overstretch. It creates skin that matches the color, texture, and thickness of the surrounding tissue, while minimizing scars and risk of rejection.

When skin is stretched beyond its physiological limit, mechanotransduction pathways are activated. This leads to cell growth as well as to the formation of new cells. In some cases, this may be accomplished by the implantation of inflatable balloons under the skin. By far the most common method, the surgeon inserts the inflatable expander beneath the skin and periodically, over weeks or months, injects a saline solution to slowly stretch the overlaying skin. The growth of tissue is permanent, but will retract to some degree when the expander is removed. Topically applied tissue expansion devices also exist. These have the benefit of being inexpensive and do not require a surgical procedure to implant them under the skin.

Breast reconstruction surgery, for example, can use this technique when the mammary gland is removed by surgery (mastectomy). Later, a more permanent breast implant filled with saline or silicone gel is inserted under the expanded skin pocket.

In other applications, excess skin is grown purposely by expansion on the back or the buttocks, so that it can be harvested later for transplantation to another site where skin was lost due to trauma, extensive wounds, surgery, burns, etc.

=== Mechanics of skin expansion ===
Stretching the skin beyond normal expansion invokes several mechanotransduction pathways which increase mitotic activity and promote collagen synthesis. As a result, the skin surface area increases. Continuum mechanics approaches can be used to model skin growth during tissue expansion and non-linear finite element methods can be used to computationally simulate different tissue growth scenarios.

Tissue growth due to skin expansion can be modeled as anisotropic surface area growth as described by the following equations:

$$F = F^e \cdot F^g\,$$

where $F^e$ is elastic area stretch that is reversible and $F^g$ is irreversible area growth described by:

$$F^g = \sqrt{\theta^{g}}\mathbb{I}+[1-\sqrt{\theta^{g}}]n_{0}\otimes n_{0} \,$$

where $n_{0}$ is a vector in the direction of skin thickness. We assume that the skin does not grow in the thickness direction for area growth is equal to volume growth or $\theta^{g} = det(F^{g}) = J^{g}$. We also assume that the newly created skin will have the same density, stiffness, and microstructure as the original, non-expanded skin.

=== Radial forearm free flaps ===
Recent studies have demonstrated that using topical tissue expansion can reduce the need for a split thickness skin graft after harvesting a forearm free flap. The authors noted that this results in less pain as well as reduced healing time. This method has also been shown to be cost effective as well as improve cosmetics.

=== In scalp reconstruction ===
Tissue expansion has been used on the scalp for treating scalp scarring and baldness, in lieu of hair transplantation when there is insufficient donor hair to transplant on the scar or the scar tissue is not vascularized to support hair growth. For instance, in a patient who had melanomas removed from the scalp resulting in alopecia defects (hair loss), tissue expansion can be used to allow for the removal of scars and complete hair coverage. The two main indications for choosing tissue expansion over hair grafting are the size and shape of the defect relative to potential supply of donor hair, and the quality and thickness of the scar tissue. Areas of significant scarring and/or tissue atrophy, which is likely to make hair grafting unsuccessful, are best excised and replaced by normal expanded scalp skin. According to research from Dr Jeffrey Stuart Epstein while he was a professor at University of Miami, theoretically there is no limit to the amount of tissue that can be created with tissue expansion, provided the process is conducted gradually.

=== Foreskin restoration ===
Tissue expansion has also been used for the technique of foreskin restoration, which is usually non-surgical and applies tension externally using specialized devices to replace circumcised tissues with new cells.

Non-surgical tissue expansion techniques can expand one's surviving penile skin and mucosa, making it a longer tube so it can function like a foreskin.

Men who have been circumcised stretch and apply tension to their shaft and foreskin remnants to expand and elongate tissue in efforts to produce a functional foreskin. This form of tissue expansion can take years, as the amount of skin growth required is typically around 15 in^{2}. The process is also suitable for those who believe their circumcision was too tight or uneven, which can cause painful erections or other complications. A related treatment is reducing phimosis or paraphimosis in adults by gently stretching the preputial orifice.

== Bone expansion ==
Bone is another tissue that can be expanded relatively easily, by using external devices which are slowly separated using mechanical contraptions, so that bone grows in response to elongation (bone distractor). Other techniques and external devices have been studied and have shown some success, such as in the fitbone surgery. This technique was pioneered in 1951 by the Russian physician Ilizarov, and is called the Ilizarov apparatus. It is capable of lengthening limbs in cases of pathological loss of bone, asymmetry of limbs, dwarfism, short stature, etc. In reconstructive and cosmetic surgery, bone expanders have been used to elongate the mandibula in cases of congenital disorders, trauma, tumors, etc. Other newer devices such as the orthofix and intramedullary skeletal kinetic distractor (ISKD) are also used for limb lengthening. It can add over 6 inches per bone, but is expensive, painful, and time-consuming (each procedure lasts around 8–12 months).

== Muscle expansion ==
Muscle tissue may also expand and grow, in a process known as stretch-induced myofibrillogenesis.

== Tissue inflammation ==
Inflammation, in the biological sense, refers to the cellular response of the body to disturbances, be they internal or external. In the case of asthma or chronic bronchitis the human body responds to allergens or pollutants by flooding the bronchial tree and airway walls with mononuclear cells. The layers of the airway wall, including the inner epithelial tissue lining thickens and expands anywhere from 10% to 300% of healthy individuals, and obstructs air flow. Enduring the disease long term coupled with airway hyperresponsiveness (smooth muscle contraction or Bronchial hyperresponsiveness) leads to chronic continuous inflammation and thickening, and noticeable airway remodeling consisting of stiffer airways and lost elasticity. Inflammation in a constricted cylinder, as with an airway, eventually folds over on itself, leading to mechanically studied buckling patterns and growth relationships within tissue linings.

== Breast tissue expansion ==
Tissue expansion is a common technique used for breast reconstruction. This essentially involves expansion of the breast skin and muscle using a temporary tissue expander. Three to four weeks after the mastectomy, a saline solution will be injected into the expander to gradually fill it. This process is supported by a tiny valve mechanism located inside the expander and it will continue until its size is slightly larger than the other breast. Typically it can take several weeks to months to complete the process. This tissue expander is removed after a few months and microvascular flap reconstruction or the insertion of a permanent breast implant is done at the time. Chemotherapy or radiation is sometimes recommended by the medical/radiation oncologist following mastectomy. These treatments delay the tissue expansion process by approximately four to eight weeks. Tissue expanders have silicone outer shells and either an internal valve or external port to allow for saline fluid injections.

== Alternatives to skin expansion ==
Research dedicated to alternative skin grafts is currently within the purview of tissue engineering. Multiple engineered tissue-derived and tissue-like substances have made it through the FDA and into the market, though financial success has been moderate. Limitations of this strategy include long incubation times, as well as difficulty in mimicking that exact mechanical and biological properties of functional skin. However, benefits range from decreased donor site morbidity (as a result of no longer needing to harvest from skin expansion) as well as a ready-available source of materials for emergency medicine in the case of traumatic burn or injury. There remains much clinical interest today in developing inexpensive engineered skin grafts that possess the mechanical and biological properties of skin.

== See also ==
- Foreskin restoration
- Mitosis
- Stretching (body piercing)
- Hypertrophy
- Hyperplasia
