= ShangRing =

Circumcision device

The ShangRing is a disposable medical device designed for male circumcision, characterised by its elimination of traditional need for suturing in circumcision and its simplicity of operation using the two-clamp system.

Consisting of two concentric plastic rings that clamp the foreskin for removal, the ShangRing comprises several unique design elements and comes in 32 sizes to accommodate various anatomical needs. It can be used with two techniques: the flip and no-flip methods, depending on the patient's age and anatomy. Local anaesthesia is required before the procedures.

There are potential risks and complications associated with the use of ShangRing. The ShangRing may be used as an alternative to traditional and laser circumcision methods, depending on individual needs.

== Basic Information ==
=== Intended Use ===
The ShangRing is designed for male circumcision, which is defined as the removal or excision of the foreskin or prepuce. The ShangRing is approved for use in both adolescent and adult males. For adolescent and adult males aged 13 years and older, either the flip technique or the no-flip technique can be used with the ShangRing. For boys aged 10 to 12 years, only the no-flip technique is advised.

=== Design and Features ===
The ShangRing consists of one inner and one outer concentric plastic ring. They work together to clamp the foreskin before its surgical removal.

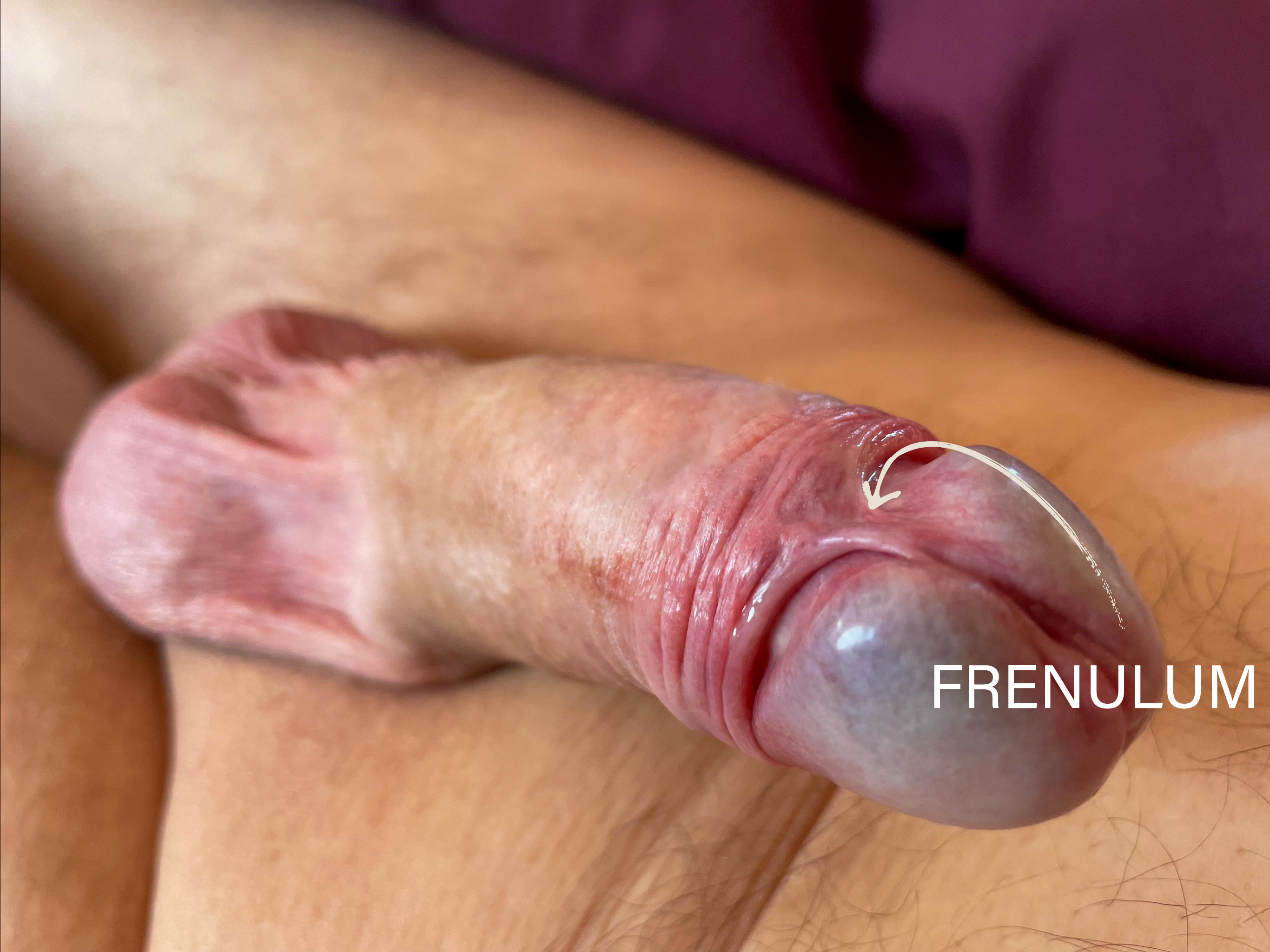
Frenulum attaching foreskin to glans penis.

The device incorporates several design elements. Firstly, the collar-shaped design includes self-locking ratchets that provide physicians with improved visibility during the circumcision procedure, allowing for a precise removal of the foreskin while preserving the frenulum. The cascade ratchet mechanism enables precise adjustments to accommodate different anatomical needs. Secondly, the inner ring is lined with a silicone rubber cushion that ensures a uniform, tight clamp on the foreskin without exposing the wound. It facilitates easier wound cleaning, reduces the risk of infection, and promotes faster recovery. Thirdly, projections along the outer ring prevent the device from dislocating during use. These projections also allow for the flow of interstitial fluid, which helps reduce the risk of edema and other complications.

The ShangRing has become the first medical device designed to facilitate circumcision surgery.

First introduced in China in 2005, The ShangRing is used worldwide today. It has received international certifications, including FDA clearance in the United States and the CE Mark from the European Union.

=== Sizes ===
The ShangRing is available in 32 sizes, ranging from A4 to Z2, with inside diameters varying from 9 mm to 40 mm. The wide size range it provides can accommodate patients with different anatomical needs.

ShangRing Size Table
Shang Ring size	Inner diameter of inner ring (mm)
A4	40
A3	39
A2	38
A1	37
A	36
B	35
C	34
D	33
E	32
F	31
G	30
H	29
I	28
J	27
K	26
L	25
M	24
N	23
O	22
P	21
Q	20
R	19
S	18
T	17
U	16
V	15
W	14
X	13
Y	12
Z	11
Z1	10
Z2	9

=== Techniques ===
==== Flip vs. No-Flip ====
The ShangRing procedure can be performed with either the flip technique or the no-flip technique. In the flip technique, the foreskin is flipped over the inner ring before the outer ring is applied. This technique is suitable for older adolescents and adults. In the no-flip technique, the foreskin is clamped directly without flipping, which makes it more suitable for younger patients, particularly those aged 10 to 12 years, or for patients with specific anatomical considerations.

== Usage and Procedure ==
=== Anaesthesia ===
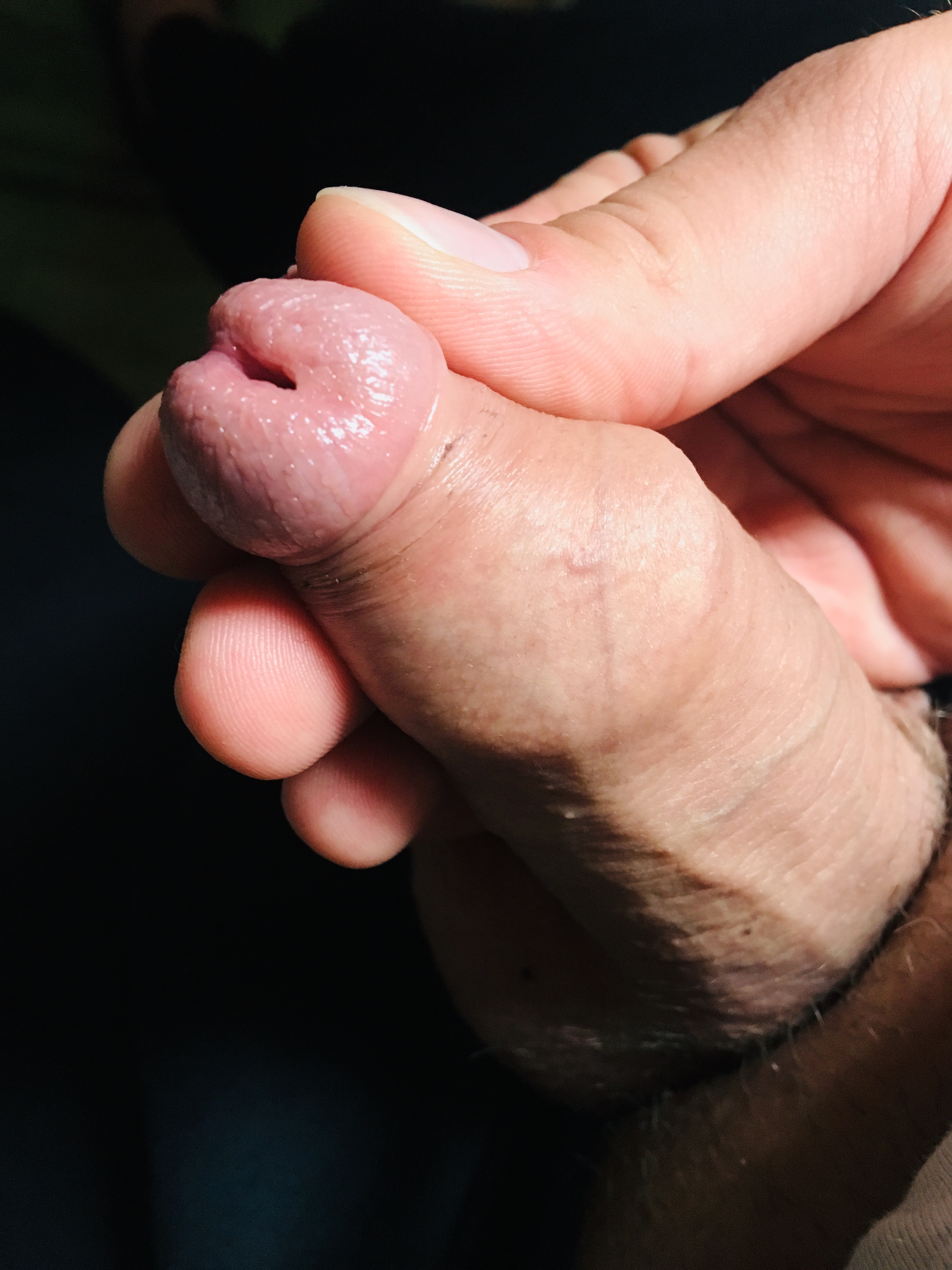
The image shows the phimosis condition. Topical anaesthesia is only used for patients without this medical condition.

The ShangRing procedure requires local anaesthesia, which can be administered topically or via injection. Topical anaesthesia is used only with the no-flip technique and is suitable solely for patients without foreskin adhesions or phimosis. The recommended anaesthetic cream contains 2.5% lidocaine and 2.5% prilocaine. To apply the cream, it should be liberally distributed both around and inside the foreskin, as well as over the glans, if the foreskin can be retracted. A needle-free syringe can be used to assist the cream application inside the foreskin. Additionally, the anaesthetic cream should also be applied to the external surface of the penis, from the foreskin's tip to the base of the shaft. The cream should remain in place for 25 to 30 minutes to allow sufficient time before testing for anaesthetic effectiveness. After achieving the desired effect, the remaining cream should be wiped off, and the genital area should be thoroughly disinfected with an appropriate antiseptic, such as povidone-iodine, unless contraindicated by an allergy. It is recommended to perform at least three applications of disinfectant, with a two-minute interval before proceeding with the device placement.

Injectable anaesthesia can be used with either the flip or no-flip technique. The anaesthetic solution may consist of either lidocaine alone or a mixture of lidocaine and bupivacaine. After administering the anaesthetic, the base of the penis should be massaged to facilitate the spread of the solution. A waiting period of 3 to 5 minutes is required before testing all four quadrants of the penis to ensure effective anaesthesia is achieved. Two primary techniques are used for injectable anaesthesia. The dorsal penile nerve block involves injecting the anaesthetic at the one o'clock and eleven o'clock positions along the dorsal penile nerves. The circumferential ring block involves injecting the anaesthetic circumferentially around the base of the penis between the superficial (dartos) and deep (Buck's) fascia to achieve a complete block.

=== Procedure ===
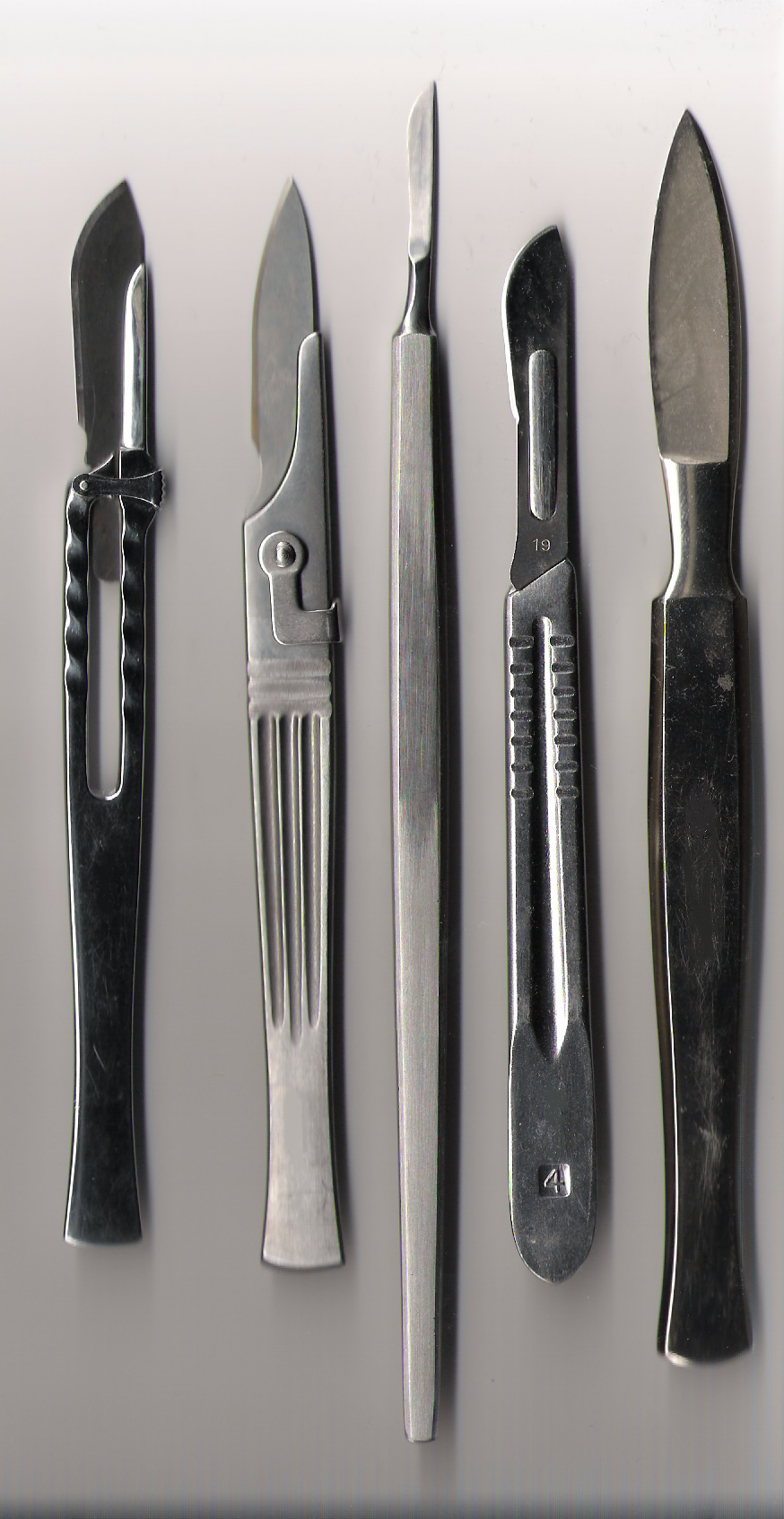
Various scalpels, which are used to create slits in the foreskin.

The ShangRing circumcision procedure begins by measuring the penis to select the appropriate device size. After the suitable size is determined, local anaesthesia is administered, and the surgical site is prepared with an antiseptic. The inner ring is positioned below or proximal to the level of the coronal sulcus. Clamps are then used at the 3, 6, 9 and 12 o'clock positions to evert, or turn inside out, the foreskin over the inner ring. Next, the outer ring is placed over the inner ring, securely clamping the foreskin between the two rings. The foreskin is then removed beneath the device using surgical scissors. In some cases, eight to ten small slits are made in the foreskin on the underside of the ring using a scalpel. These slits facilitate healing during erections and allow the scab to expand. The procedure is completed by leaving the ShangRing device in place for seven days to support proper healing.

== Benefits & Drawbacks ==
=== Benefits ===
The ShangRing circumcision technique is acclaimed by both medical professionals and patients for its simplicity and ease of use. This procedure can be done without stitches, which reduces the risk of complications like infection and scarring is avoided. Its sutureless design enhances patient comfort during healing. In addition, the ShangRing is cost-effective, requiring minimal specialised equipment and the procedure is straightforward. It, therefore, benefits individual patients as well as publicly-funded healthcare systems, especially in poverty-stricken countries.

Another advantage is the speed of the procedure. Most of the time, the procedure takes 3 to 5 minutes, which is significantly shorter than most circumcision procedures which typically take at least 30 minutes. This efficiency allows healthcare providers to redirect time and resources to other purposes. In addition, patients can shower immediately after surgery, ensuring hygiene and comfort. This immediacy in maintaining personal hygiene is particularly important for healing and preventing infections. The simplicity, speed, and ease of use of the ShangRing make it a viable option for individuals considering circumcision.

The ShangRing method also supports smooth recovery with minimal disruption to daily life. Patients are advised to avoid heavy activities and some physical exertions for a few days following the procedure, but walking around and light activities are permitted without significantly disrupting daily life. The same applies to early return to work for most patients whose jobs do not involve much physical exertion. This implies that life after the procedure is minimally affected, which is important especially for people who have busy schedules or when they live in countries where healthcare services access is limited.

=== Drawbacks ===
One primary drawback is post-operative pain, particularly during erections in the first week. Increased sensitivity can cause discomfort and may require additional pain management measures. Although pain is an expected outcome of most surgeries, its impact on circumcision will prove to be more difficult for some patients.

Another aspect of the possible problems with the ShangRing method is that the healing time might be longer than traditional circumcision techniques. This is because the healing process involves secondary intention, where the wound closes up naturally without the aid of a suture. Though in some cases this may lead to less scarring, there is a greater chance that it may prolong recovery time. Therefore, patients should prepare for the possibility of a longer time-span for rest and recuperation.

There is a risk of ring placement failure with the ShangRing method. This occurs if the ring slips off or there is damage to the foreskin at the time of ring placement. Additional surgery might be needed in such instances to correct the problem. Though small, the risk should not be overlooked and patients should be counselled on post-procedure instructions to minimise complications after the procedure.

More follow-up visits will be needed for ShangRing removal compared to traditional method, which further adds to the logistical burden of the procedure. These visits will not only establish if the circumcision heals as desired but also remove the ring once it serves its purpose. The inconvenience can be significant in places where sufficient healthcare services are not accessible or patients have a busy schedule. This, however, helps prevent potential complications and promotes a successful outcome.

== Potential Risks and Complications ==
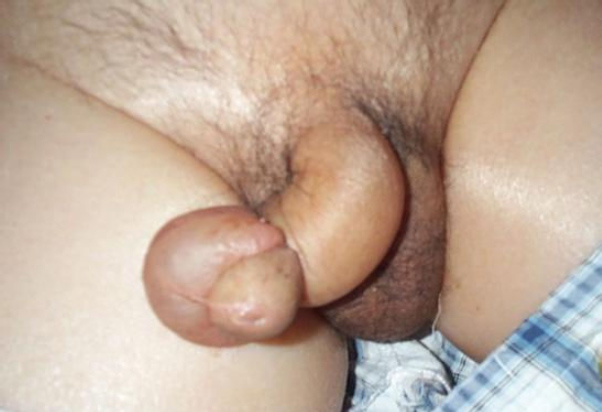
A patient experiencing penile edema, which is a serious potential post-operation complication. The swelling is usually the most significant between the line of the circumcision and the ridge of the head of the penis.

The ShangRing procedure also involves the possible risks and complications that must be considered. For at least two to three days, the patient should rest at home after the procedure and refrain from vigorous activities, heavy sweating, swimming, sex, and masturbation for at least four weeks or until the wound is completely healed. In most cases, light work or any activity that does not strain the body can be resumed within a few days, but these instructions ought to be followed to ensure proper healing and minimise the risk of complications.

Some serious post-operative complications include significant penile edema, bleeding, difficulty in urination, increased pain and redness, bruising, fever, and other signs of infection (for example, pus or discharge), which require immediate medical care to avert bad outcomes. Patient should be informed of the associated risks and monitor their recovery closely. Should any unusual symptoms develop, he should seek medical advice to aid his successful and safe recovery.

== Comparisons ==
=== ShangRing vs. Traditional Circumcision ===
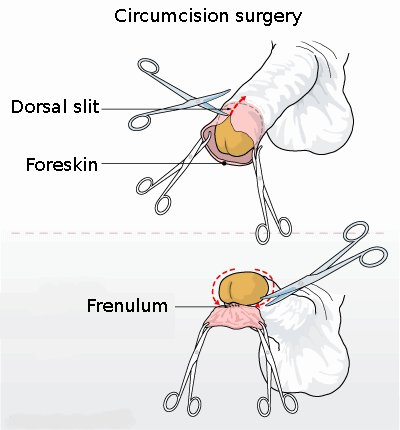
Traditional circumcision

The ShangRing method for circumcision has some differences from conventional techniques of circumcision. One key difference is procedure time. ShangRing circumcision typically takes about 3 to 5 minutes, significantly faster than traditional methods, which often take 30 minutes to an hour. This shorter procedure time saves both time and costs for the patient and provider.

The ShangRing method is less invasive, involving minimal tissue manipulation and no sutures, which reduces the risk of infection and promotes rapid healing. In contrast, traditional circumcision involves a lot more tissue manipulation and sutures, increasing the likelihood of complicated by bleeding and infection.

Relating to pain and complications, The ShangRing method has a lower risk of bleeding and infection compared to traditional circumcision but has been found to result in more pain during erections after the procedure. Traditional circumcision has a higher risk of bleeding and infection due to the use of sutures and greater manipulation of tissues.

Another notable difference is the healing time. In general, traditional circumcision heals faster than ShangRing because the latter undergoes secondary healing after the ring is removed. Despite this, the ShangRing method is associated with fewer complications and tends to have a smoother healing process because of the sutureless method.

=== ShangRing vs. Laser Circumcision ===
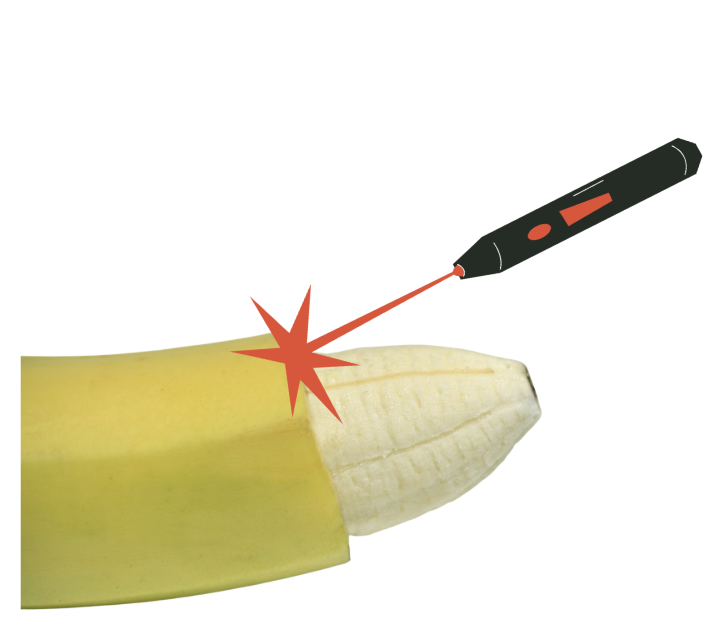
Illustration of Laser Circumcision

The ShangRing method and laser circumcision differ in several aspects. The time taken for the procedure is one of the major differences: ShangRing circumcision takes 3 to 5 minutes, while laser circumcision takes 15 to 30 minutes.

Both of the procedures may be regarded as minimally invasive when compared with conventional surgery; however, the ShangRing method "does less manipulation of tissue" and therefore has fewer complications. Although laser circumcision is also considered non-invasive compared to the traditional method, it does not significantly reduce the risk of bleeding and infection.

The ShangRing technique is used alternatively due to lower pain and fewer complications compared to laser circumcision, which carries a higher risk of complications and bleeding. This is due to the fact that the ShangRing provides hemostasis and reduces postoperative bleeding and risk of infection.
