= Circumcision surgical procedure =

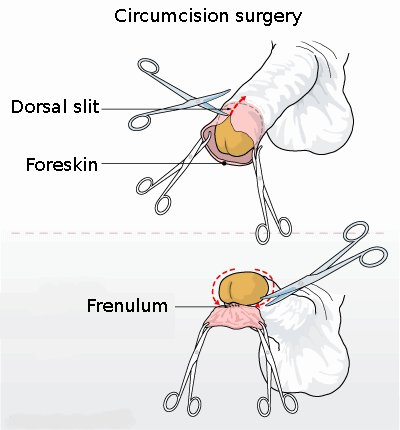
- Circumcision surgery with hemostats and scissors
- ICD-10-PCS: Z41.2
- ICD-9-CM: V50.2
- MeSH: D002944
- MedlinePlus: 002998
- eMedicine: 1015820

Circumcision surgical procedure in males involves either a "cut and stitch" surgical procedure or use of a circumcision instrument or device. In the newborn period (less than 2 months of age), almost all circumcisions are done by generalist practitioners using one of three surgical instruments. In the United States, the Gomco clamp is the most utilized instrument, followed by the Mogen clamp and the Plastibell. They are also used worldwide.

In the 21st century, most circumcisions in boys and men are performed using one of three open surgical methods. The forceps-guided method, the dorsal slit method, and the sleeve resection method are well described by the World Health Organization in their Manual for Male Circumcision under Local Anaesthesia. The Gomco clamp and Mogen clamp are sometimes used after the newborn period, in conjunction with either surgical sutures or cyanoacrylate tissue adhesive to prevent post-operative bleeding.

Circumcision surgical instruments should be distinguished from circumcision devices. Circumcision instruments are used at the time of surgery, and the circumcision is complete at the end of the procedure. The Gomco clamp, the Mogen clamp, and Unicirc are surgical instruments. Circumcision devices remain on the penis for 4 to 7 days and either spontaneously detach or are removed surgically at a subsequent visit. Plastibell, ShangRing, and other plastic rings are all circumcision devices, also known as "in situ" devices. Circumcision via instrument results in healing by primary intention and healing via devices is by secondary intention, so healing is delayed. All circumcision procedures should involve adequate injectable or topical anesthesia.

== Complications ==
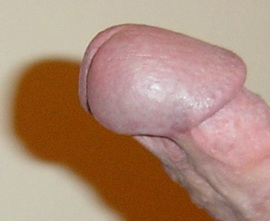
A skin bridge, a possible circumcision complication. The condition is treatable with surgical excision.

Overall, complication rates for circumcision are low.

Complications may include bleeding, infection, reduction in sensation of the glans penis, too little or too much tissue removal, or – extremely rarely – death. After the newborn period, circumcision has a higher risk of complications, especially bleeding and anesthetic complications.

== Healing process ==
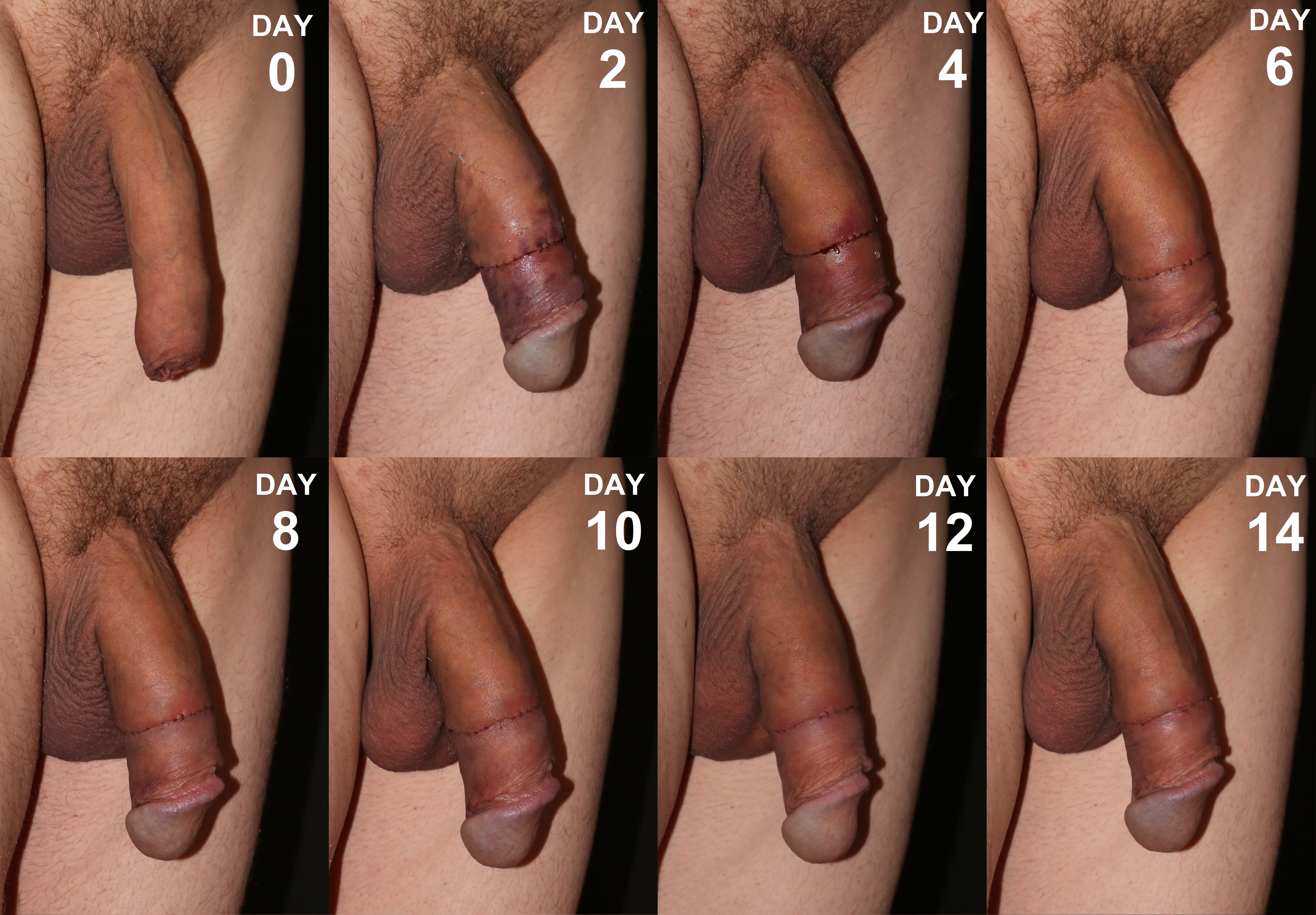
Timeline of healing after sleeve resection circumcision on an adult.

The time healing takes after circumcision varies by age, by procedure used, and by person. Generally some behaviors such as bathing can be resumed as early as 3 days after the surgery while other behaviors like masturbation or intercourse should be abstained from for longer, 4-6 weeks. Swelling should be entirely gone after 6 months when performed on a child. Patients who are older when the surgery is performed may experience longer healing times.

== Circumcision surgical instruments ==
=== Gomco clamp ===
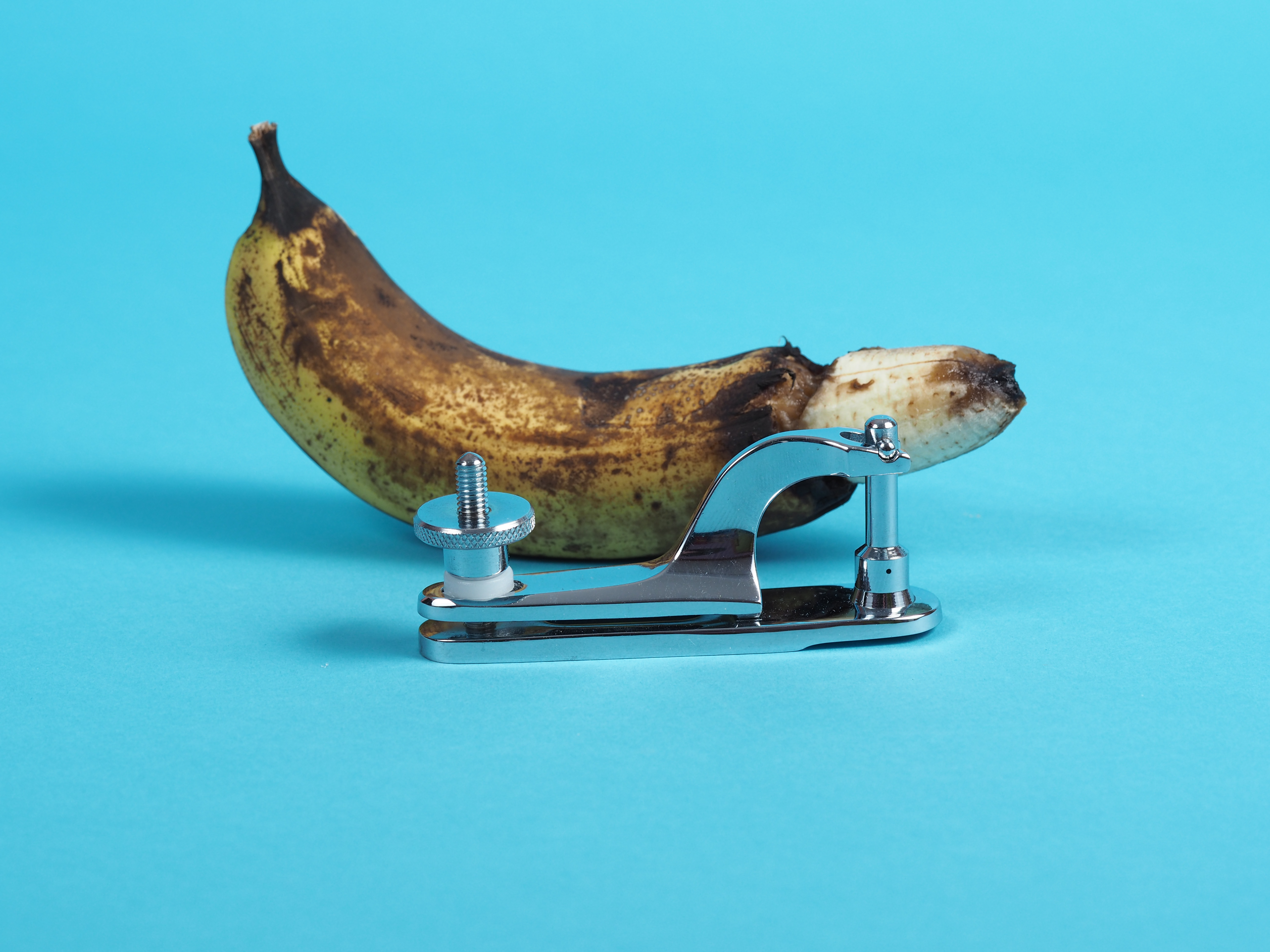
Gomco clamp with "circumcised" banana for scale

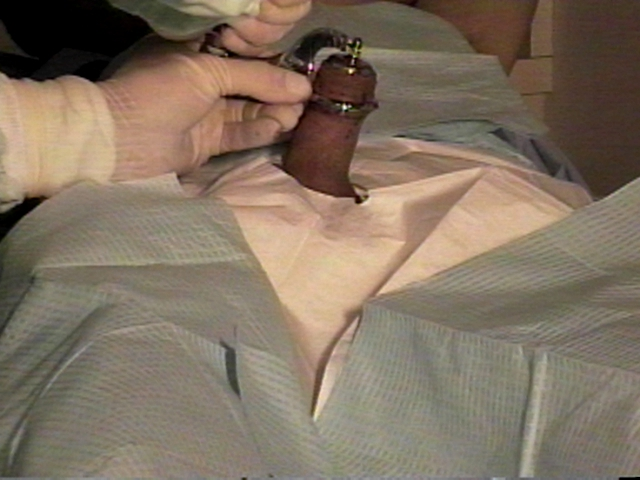
An adult man being circumcised with a Gomco clamp

The Gomco clamp is a surgical instrument used to perform circumcision in all age groups, but is mainly used in newborn circumcision. It is the leading instrument for newborn circumcision in the US. The World Health Organization described it as having "an impeccable safety record" in 2010.

After retracting the foreskin, the Gomco bell is placed over the glans at the level of the corona and the foreskin is replaced into the anatomic (natural) position. The yoke is then placed over the bell, trapping the foreskin between the bell and the yoke. The clamp is tightened, crushing the foreskin between the bell and the base plate, and left in place for five minutes. The crushed blood vessels provide hemostasis. The flared bottom of the bell fits tightly against the hole of the base plate, so the foreskin may be cut away with a scalpel from above the base plate, the intent being a lower risk of injuring the glans.

==== Advantages ====
Circumcision is rapid and completed in a single session. The total procedure takes less than ten minutes, five minutes of which is spent in waiting for the crushing action to take place. In newborns (<2 months of age), no sutures are needed and bleeding is uncommon. After the newborn period, either sutures or cyanoacrylate tissue adhesive can be used to seal the fused mucosal-skin edge to prevent post-operative bleeding. Because the glans is protected by the bell of the Gomco clamp, injuries to the glans are rare. No parts are left on the penis, so late complications are rare compared to devices like the Plastibell which remain on the penis.

==== Complications ====
Care must be taken to ensure that the device is properly sterilized between procedures, or transmission of infection may occur. The American Academy of Pediatrics reviewed one study of 1,000 newborn Gomco circumcisions in a hospital setting in Saudi Arabia and rated it "fair evidence". The study found an overall complication rate of 1.9%. Bleeding occurred in 0.6% of cases, infection in 0.4%, and insufficient foreskin removed in 0.3%.

Because the Gomco clamp is made of three major parts, there is a chance that pieces could be incorrectly assembled from differently sized units or those produced by different manufacturers. Using mismatched parts results in a device that might not sufficiently crush the foreskin, potentially resulting in bleeding.

==== History ====
The Gomco clamp was invented by Dr. Hiram S. Yellen and Aaron A. Goldstein in 1935. Yellen, an obstetrician-gynecologist in Buffalo, New York, sought an improved method of newborn circumcision. Goldstein was a prolific local inventor and manufacturer. Gomco stands for the GOldstein Medical COmpany, the original manufacturer of the instrument. The patent was in the name of Aaron Goldstein (U.S. patent D119180S, issued February 27, 1940). The instrument was a quick success and was widely marketed and sold in the US and Canada. It has since been manufactured and marketed worldwide.

==== Prevalence ====
The Gomco clamp is the leading instrument used to perform non-ritual male circumcision in the United States. There is little information concerning prevalence of Gomco use outside of the US. A 1998 survey found that the Gomco clamp was the technique preferred by 67% of American physicians, whereas Plastibell was used by 19% and the Mogen clamp by 10%.

=== Mogen clamp ===
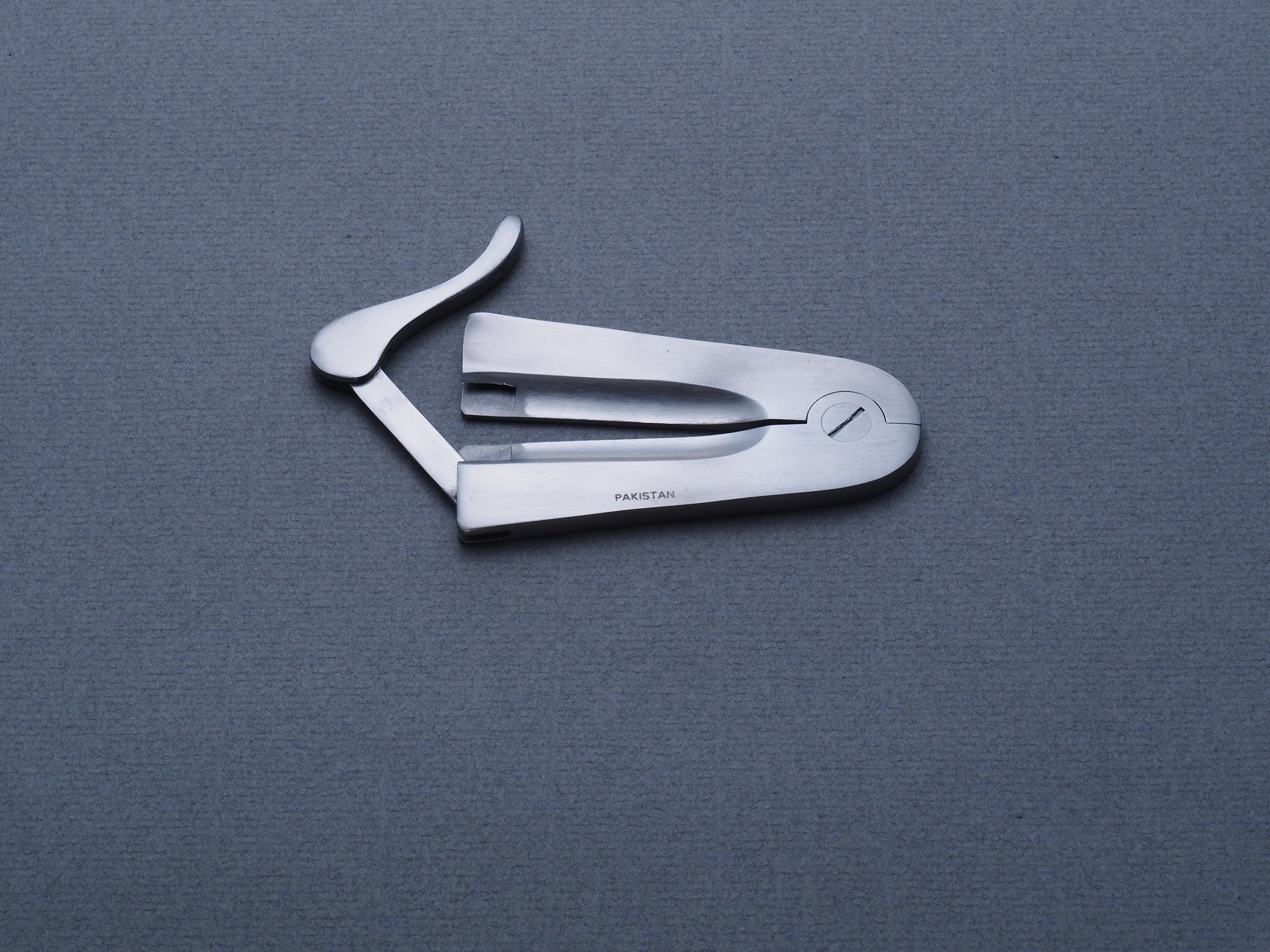
An open Mogen clamp. The foreskin would be placed between the two main pieces and then sliced with the pressure of them being locked together via the latch on the left

The Mogen clamp is a surgical instrument which permits rapid circumcision. It is most often used in the newborn period, particularly for Jewish ceremonial circumcision (Bris), but is also used in older boys. The newborn version has two flat blades that open 2.5 mm. The Mogen clamp is widely used around the world.

The foreskin is first extended using several straight hemostats. The Mogen clamp is then slid over the foreskin. After confirming that the tip of the glans is free of the blades, the clamp is locked, and a scalpel is used to cut the skin from the flat (upper) side of the clamp. In newborns, no sutures are required. Outside of the newborn period, cyanoacrylate tissue adhesive or sutures may be used.

==== Advantages ====
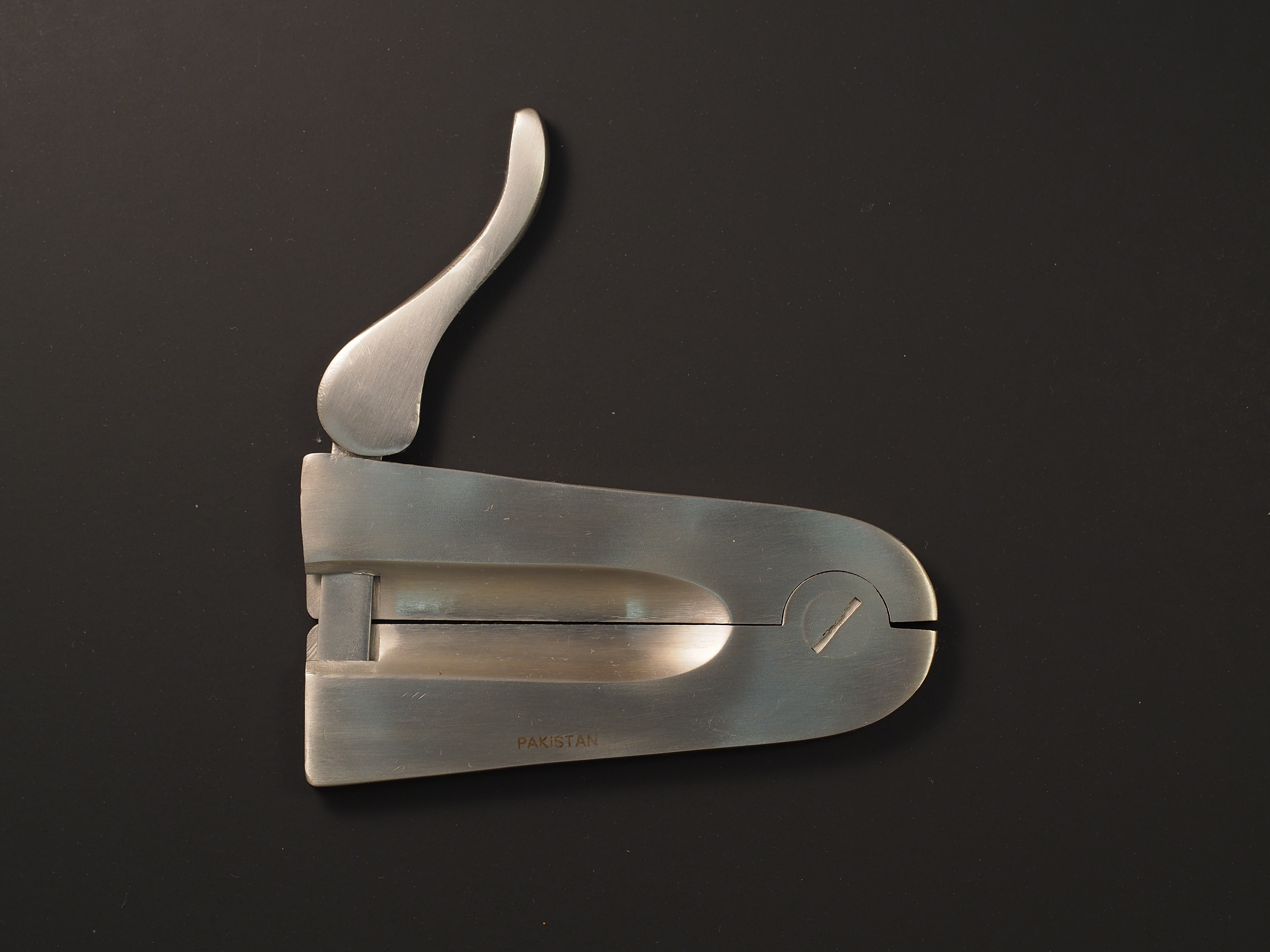
A closed Mogen clamp, showing the lever on top ready to be pushed down to apply pressure

The Mogen clamp has no parts to assemble, is easy to use, and results in a bloodless circumcision with minimal scarring. A single size can be used for infants, obviating any sizing errors. It is rapid, but requires five minutes of clamping to prevent post-operative bleeding. Any complications are immediate, because the instrument is not left on the penis, so they can be dealt with on site. The clamp can be safely used by non-physician healthcare workers in resource-limited settings.

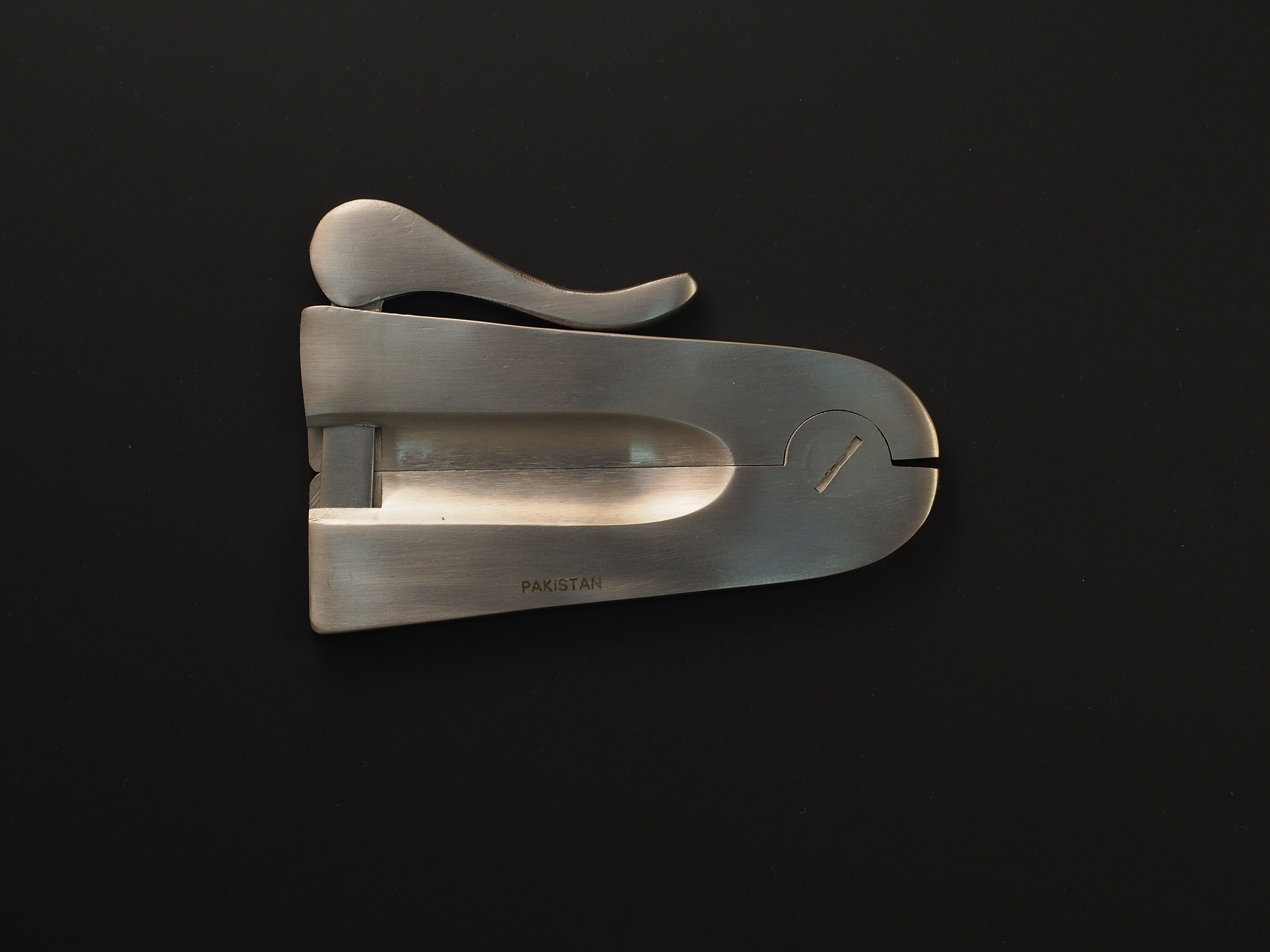
A closed Mogen clamp, showing the lever on top pushed down, pressing the two pieces together

==== Complications ====
Care must be taken to ensure that the device is properly sterilized between procedures, or transmission of infection may occur. The instrument does not directly protect the glans during the procedure, so there is a risk that the glans can be pulled into the slit and crushed or partially severed.

In July 2010, one company manufacturing Mogen clamps (Mogen Circumcision Instruments of New York) went out of business following a lawsuit in which the doctor entirely removed the head of the penis from the child. The court awarded the plaintiff $10 million in damages. This came following similar lawsuits in 2007 and 2009, which awarded $7.5 million and $2.3 million, respectively. According to the American Academy of Pediatrics, there are no good studies of complications of the Mogen clamp because complications are rare; thus, one can only rely on available case reports of glans injuries.

==== History ====
The word mogen is derived from the Hebrew word for "shield". The Mogen clamp was introduced by Dr. Harry Bronstein in 1955. Before the advent of the Mogen clamp, the Jewish shield was used, which has a narrow gap that protected the glans while the foreskin was pulled through and excised. Others modified this shield and began using instruments that produced a crushing action. Still used in many parts of the world, bone cutters are used to shield the glans, crush the foreskin tissue and guide the scalpel for a clean incision. The Mogen clamp is a refinement of these ancient techniques.

=== Stapler circumcision ===
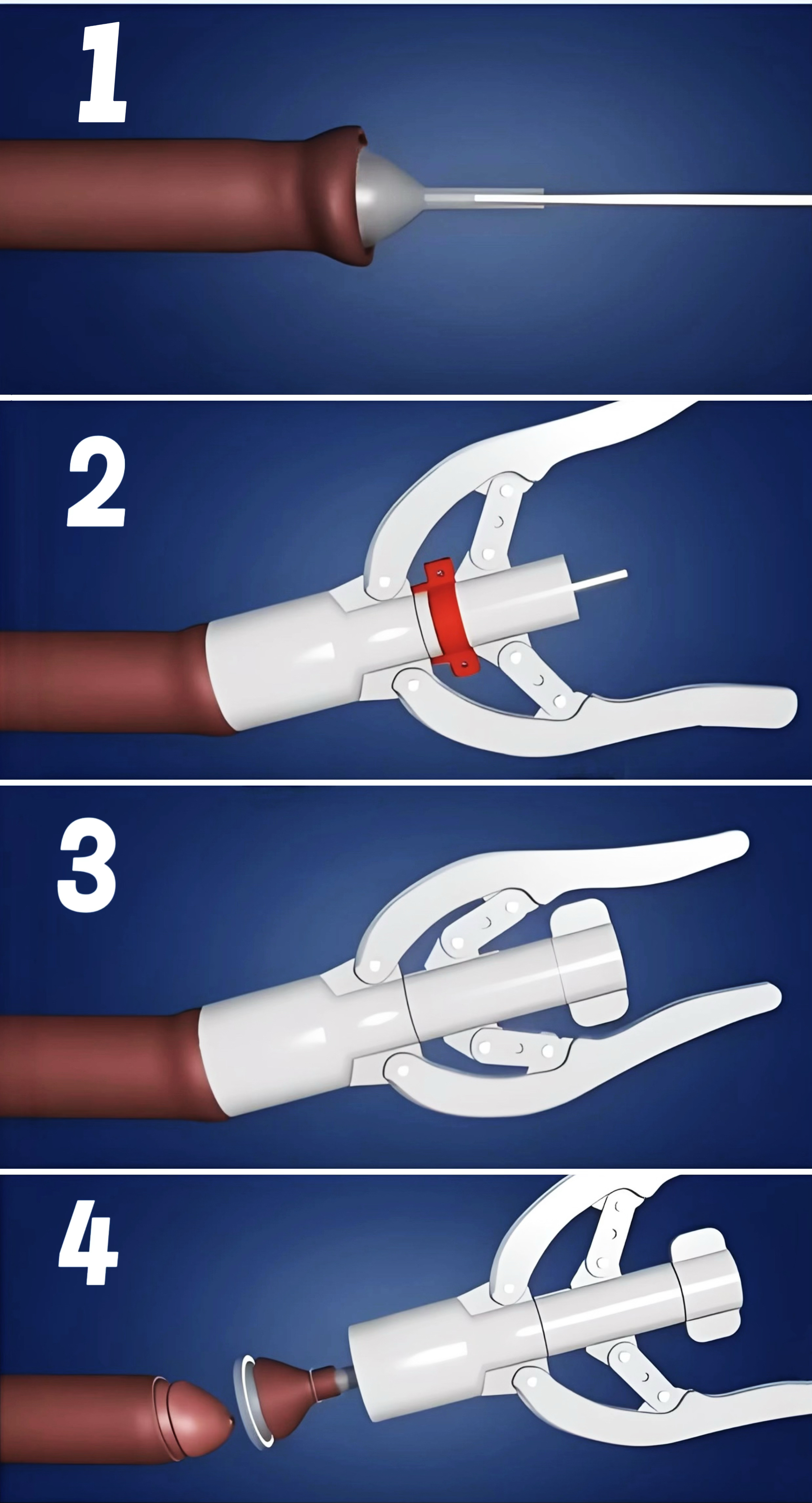
Main process of stapler circumcision

A more recent development, developed and studied in China, involves the use of a disposable circular stapler (also known as a "circumcision anastomat"). This device functions by simultaneously cutting the prepuce and sealing the wound with a circular array of stainless steel or titanium staples. The procedure typically begins with measuring the glans to select the appropriate device size, after which the device is positioned and triggered to excise the foreskin while achieving hemostasis through stapled anastomosis.

Clinical studies have indicated that the stapler technique significantly reduces operative time—often averaging between 5 and 8 minutes—and minimizes intraoperative blood loss compared to conventional sutured methods.The staples are designed to fall out spontaneously during the healing process, typically within two to four weeks. While the method is noted for superior cosmetic results and high patient satisfaction, common complications include postoperative edema and occasional delayed staple shedding that may necessitate manual removal.

=== Other instruments ===
The Winkelmann clamp is a sterilizable Gomco-like instrument which consists of a single unit, so mismatching of parts cannot occur. Unicirc is a disposable plastic and metal instrument which functions similarly to the Gomco clamp, and, according to WHO, has "nearly met the clinical evaluation study requirements described in the WHO Framework for the Clinical Evaluation of Devices."

==== Research ====
A meta-analysis of randomized controlled trials suggested that compressive instruments were associated with less blood loss, more rapid healing, and less pain compared to other techniques.

== Circumcision "in situ" devices ==
All "in situ" devices are based upon steel circumcision rings patented by Cecil Ross in 1939. Plastibell represents the first commercialization of the Ross device and is the progenitor of all subsequent "in situ" devices. Such devices consist of a plastic ring which is inserted beneath the foreskin at the level of the corona and has a ligature, or ligature device, which acts as a tourniquet. This necroses the remaining part of the foreskin and the device either detaches spontaneously after 4 to 7 days, or is removed surgically at one week. Implementation of "in situ" devices for HIV prevention has failed to demonstrate potential advantages with regard to efficiency or cost, compared to conventional surgical circumcision.

=== Plastibell ===
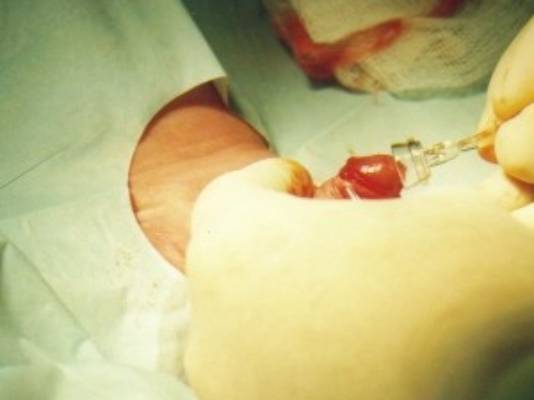
A baby midway through a Plastibell circumcision

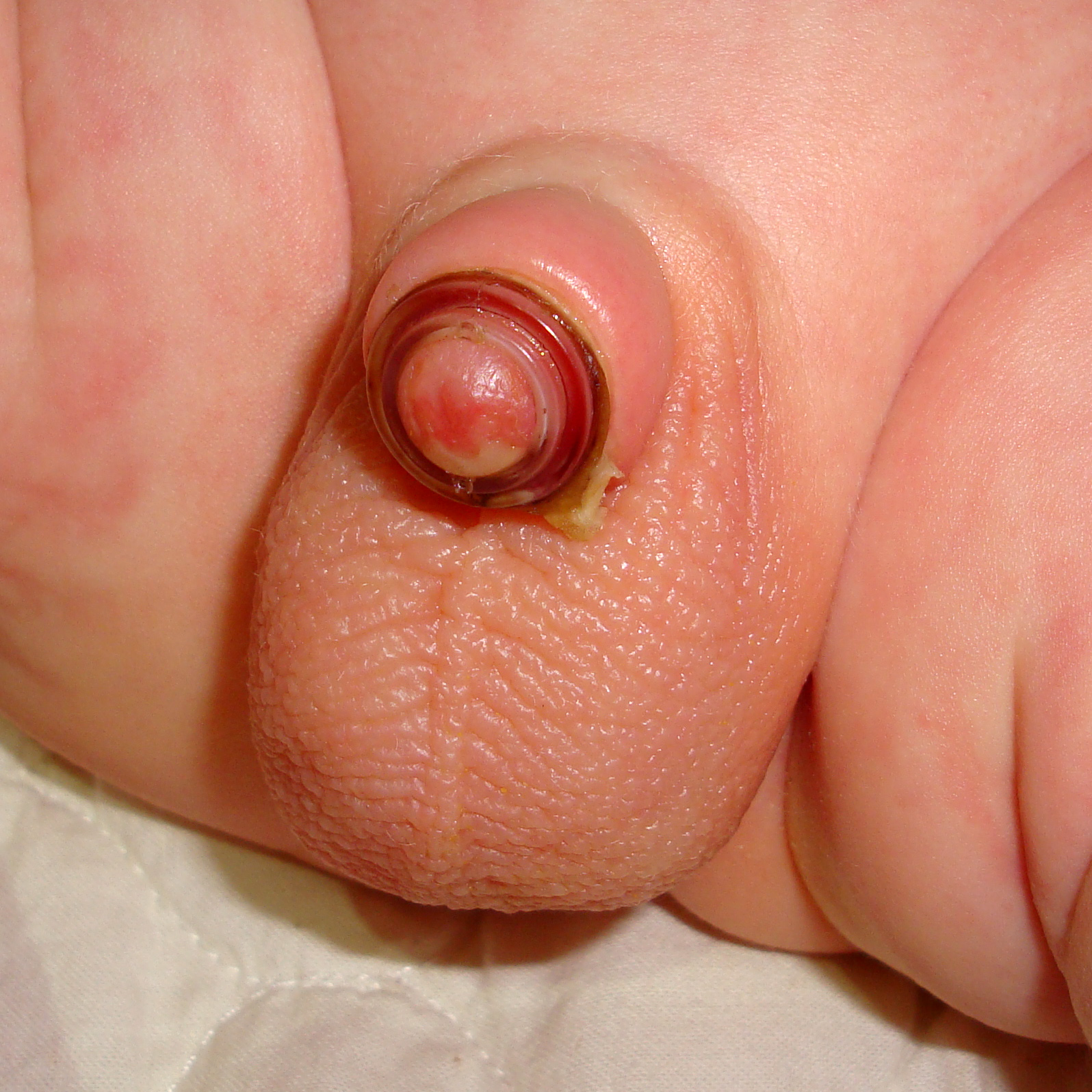
A 6-day-old Plastibell circumcision device on a one-month-old infant

Plastibell is a single-use disposable plastic device mainly used to circumcise infants which may be used for boys up to 12 years of age.

The Plastibell plastic ring is placed under the foreskin and secured with a circumferential ligature, which prevents bleeding when the distal foreskin is excised. The entire procedure takes five to ten minutes. The ring falls off after 4 to 7 days, leaving a circumferential wound that heals by secondary intention in one to two weeks.

==== Advantages ====
Plastibell is a single-use-only disposable device, which prevents reuse and potential transmission of infection. The glans is protected during the procedure by the ring, so there is a reduced risk of injury to the glans, compared to the Mogen clamp. It is a rapid procedure which can be done under clean (rather than sterile) conditions. No bandage is required, allowing for easy monitoring for bleeding or infection.

==== Complications ====
The American Academy of Pediatrics estimates that overall complications occur in 2.4–5% of Plastibell procedures. The risk of bleeding is 1%, similar to the risk with the Gomco clamp and Mogen clamp. A significant complication can occur if the glans swells and herniates (protrudes) through the ring. This worsens the swelling and can reduce blood and urine flow, resulting in serious long-term sequelae. Unlike complications occurring with surgical instruments that are dealt with immediately, this complication occurs hours to days after the patient leaves the clinic and must be dealt with promptly to prevent serious complications. Therefore, Plastibell should only be used when follow-up is rapidly available.

==== History ====
The idea of using a tourniquet approach to infant circumcision is attributed to Cecil J. Ross, who patented steel circumcision rings in 1939. Subsequently, Kariher patented a plastic ring with a removable handle in 1955. The Plastibell comes in a sterile package with a single ligature.

=== ShangRing ===
The ShangRing is a disposable plastic "in situ" device for male circumcision. It has been studied in China and Africa, and has been approved by WHO for circumcision in males over 13 years of age to prevent HIV. The ShangRing consists of two concentric medical grade plastic rings: an inner ring with a silicone band and an outer, hinged ring that acts as a ligature. The appropriate size is determined through use of a measuring strip. The inner ring is placed underneath the foreskin. The outer (hinged) ring is placed on the outside of the foreskin and locks against the inner ring when snapped together. The distal foreskin is then excised. The ShangRing is removed after one week when the outer ring locking mechanism is opened using a special tool. A pair of scissors designed for this purpose is then used to remove the inner ring.

==== Advantages ====
The ShangRing is marketed as simple, disposable, easy to use, and provides sutureless circumcision that may be an acceptable alternative to conventional surgical techniques.

==== Complications ====
As with other "in situ" devices, complications may occur up to several days following the placement procedure and must be dealt with promptly to prevent serious sequelae. ShangRing should only be used where surgical care is rapidly available. In a review by WHO personnel, 0.4% men required rapid intervention with surgical circumcision as the excision had occurred but the foreskin slipped from the device and required suturing. No serious adverse events occurred; 1% experienced moderate adverse events from a total of 1983 successful device placements. All adverse events were managed with minor interventions and resolved without long-term sequelae. Rates were similar to those observed with conventional surgical circumcision.

In settings where skilled surgeons are mostly located in urban centers, referral of clients who require surgical management of device-related complications within the recommended time frame of 6–12 hours may not be possible. Healing is by secondary intention and is therefore delayed compared to techniques which allow for healing by primary intention. There is a risk of HIV transmission if men engage in unprotected sex before the wound is healed. Thus, ShangRing circumcision requires a longer period of post-circumcision sexual abstinence than surgical or instrumental methods.

==== History ====
The ShangRing was developed by Jianzhong Shang in 2003. The ShangRing has been approved by WHO, and is cleared by the U.S. FDA under the 510(k) mechanism with Plastibell as the predicate device.

== Related devices ==
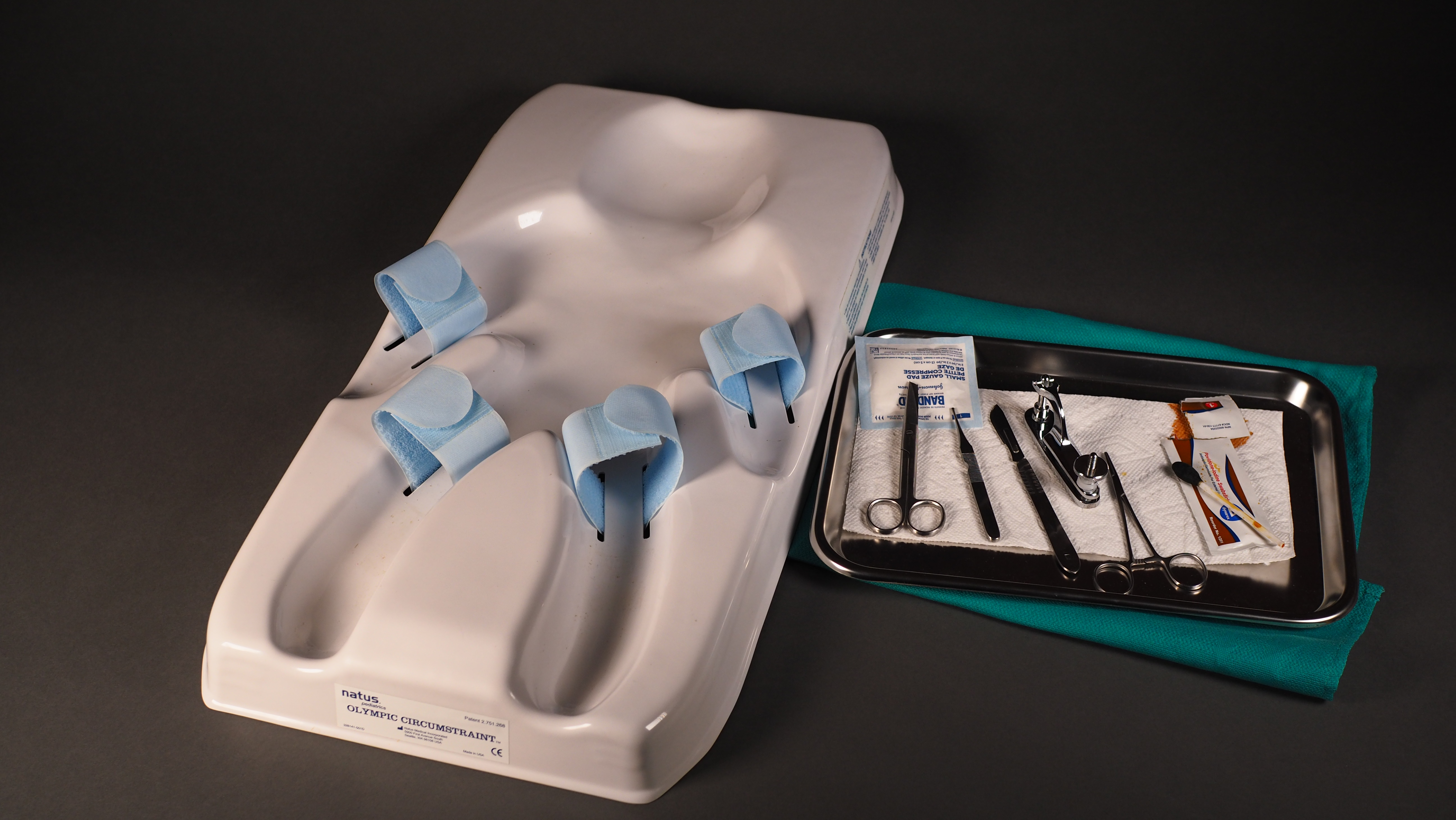
A circumstraint with circumcision tools next to it.

=== Circumstraint ===
The Circumstraint, named after a combination of circumcision and restraint, is a tool used to "immobilize newborns for circumcision." The device consists of two parts, a plastic board that is shaped with a full-body depression that fits newborn children, and 4 straps to restrain the limbs. The shape of the device is specifically designed to present the genitals of the infant for surgery. Originally made by Olympic in 1959, it is now made by Natus Medical.
