= Brit milah =

Jewish religious male circumcision ceremony

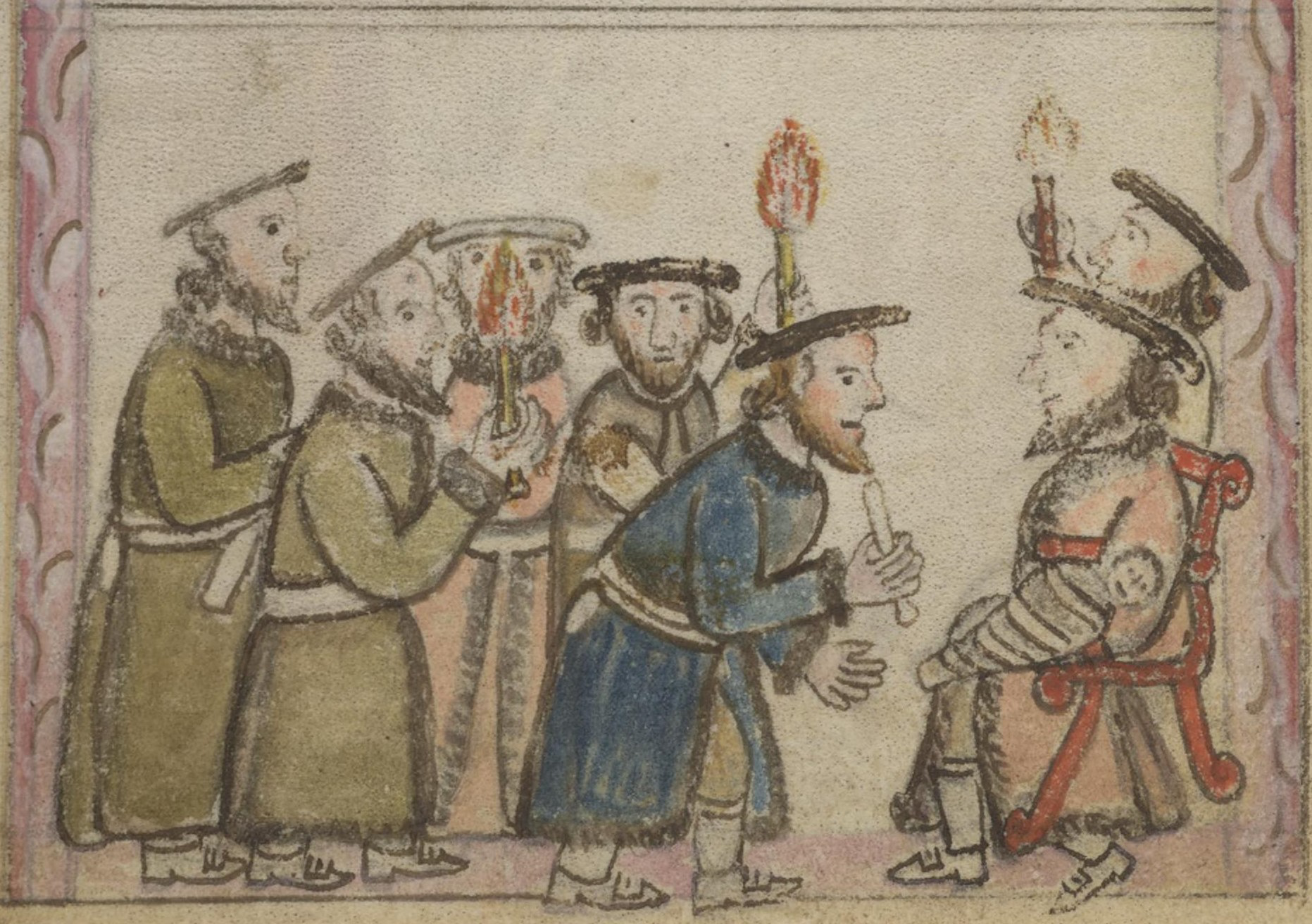
1824 illustration from Lipník nad Bečvou

The brit milah (Hebrew: בְּרִית מִילָה, Modern Israeli: [bʁit miˈla], Ashkenazi: [bris ˈmilə]; "covenant of circumcision"), or bris (Yiddish: ברית, romanized: bris), is the ceremony of circumcision in Judaism and Samaritanism during which a newborn male's foreskin is surgically removed. According to the Book of Genesis, God commanded the biblical patriarch Abraham to be circumcised: an act to be followed by his descendants on the eighth day of life symbolizing the covenant between God and the Jewish people. Today, it is generally performed by a mohel on the eighth day after the infant's birth and is followed by a celebratory meal known as a seudat mitzvah.

Brit milah is considered among the most important and central commandments in Judaism, and the rite has played a central role in Jewish history and Jewish culture. The Talmud, when discussing the importance of brit milah, considers it equal to all other mitzvot (commandments). Barring extraordinary circumstances, Abraham's descendants who voluntarily fail to undergo brit milah are believed to suffer Kareth, which is, in Jewish theology, the extinction of the soul and denial of a share in the World to Come. The brit is understood by Jews to signify acceptance into the ongoing covenant between God and the Jewish people, which is why gerim (converts to Judaism) undergo a form of brit to finalize conversion.

Historical conflicts between Jews and European civilizations have occurred several times over brit milah, including multiple campaigns of Jewish ethnic, cultural, and religious persecution, with subsequent bans and restrictions on the practice as an attempted means of forceful assimilation, most famously in the Maccabean Revolt by the Seleucid Empire. "In Jewish history, the banning of circumcision (brit milah) has historically been a first step toward more extreme and violent forms of persecution". These periods have generally been linked to suppression of Jewish religious, ethnic, and cultural identity and subsequent "punishment at the hands of government authorities for engaging in circumcision". The Maccabee victory in the Maccabean Revolt, which ended the prohibition against circumcision, is celebrated in Hanukkah. Circumcision rates are near-universal among Jews.

Brit milah also has immense importance in other religions. The Gospel of Luke records that Mary and Joseph, the parents of Jesus, had him undergo circumcision, though the vast majority of Christians do not practice religious circumcision.

== Origins (unknown to 515 BCE) ==
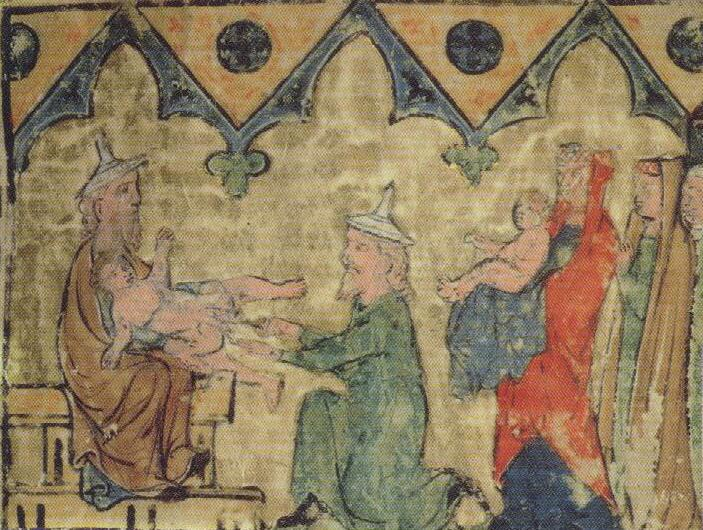
"Isaac's Circumcision", Regensburg Pentateuch, c. 1300

The origin of circumcision is not known with certainty; however, artistic and literary evidence from ancient Egypt suggests it was practiced in the ancient Near East from at least the Sixth Dynasty (c. 2345–2181 BCE). In the New Kingdom of Egypt (1550-1069 BCE), circumcision was "performed as a rite of passage from childhood to adulthood on boys who were going to become priests". The Bible extended the practice to the entire male population, in accord with the description of Israel as a "kingdom of priests" (Exodus 19:6). Thus, Biblical circumcision served to "detach circumcision from its age-old connection with puberty and transform it into a sign of the divine covenant and ethnic belonging".

According to some scholars, it appears that it only appeared as a sign of the covenant during the Babylonian Exile. Scholars who posit the existence of a hypothetical J source (likely composed during the seventh century BCE) of the Pentateuch in Genesis 15 hold that it would not have mentioned a covenant that involves the practice of circumcision. Only in the P source (likely composed during the sixth century BCE) of Genesis 17 does the notion of circumcision become linked to a covenant.

Some scholars have argued that it originated as a replacement for child sacrifice.

== Biblical references ==
According to the Hebrew Bible, Adonai commanded the biblical patriarch Abraham to be circumcised, an act to be followed by his descendants:

This is My covenant, which ye shall keep, between Me and you and thy seed after thee: every male among you shall be circumcised. And ye shall be circumcised in the flesh of your foreskin; and it shall be a token of a covenant betwixt Me and you. And he that is eight days old shall be circumcised among you, every male throughout your generations, he that is born in the house, or bought with money of any foreigner, that is not of thy seed. He that is born in thy house, and he that is bought with thy money, must needs be circumcised; and My covenant shall be in your flesh for an everlasting covenant. And the uncircumcised male who is not circumcised in the flesh of his foreskin, that soul shall be cut off from his people; he hath broken My covenant.

— Genesis 17:10–14

Leviticus 12:3 says: "And in the eighth day the flesh of his foreskin shall be circumcised."

According to the Hebrew Bible, it was "a reproach" for an Israelite to be uncircumcised. The plural term arelim ("uncircumcised") is used opprobriously, denoting the Philistines and other non-Israelites and used in conjunction with tameh (unpure) for heathen. The word arel ("uncircumcised" [singular]) is also employed for "impermeable"; it is also applied to the first three years' fruit of a tree, which is forbidden.

However, the Israelites born in the wilderness after the Exodus from Egypt were not circumcised. Joshua 5:2–9, explains, "all the people that came out" of Egypt were circumcised, but those "born in the wilderness" were not. Therefore, Joshua, before the celebration of the Passover, had them circumcised at Gilgal specifically before they entered Canaan. Abraham, too, was circumcised when he moved into Canaan.

The prophetic tradition emphasizes that God expects people to be good as well as pious, and that non-Jews will be judged based on their ethical behavior, see Noahide Law. Thus, Jeremiah 9:25–26 says that circumcised and uncircumcised will be punished alike by the Lord; for "all the nations are uncircumcised, and all the house of Israel are uncircumcised in heart".

The penalty of willful non-observance is kareth (making oneself liable to extirpation or excommunication), as noted in Genesis 17:1-14. Conversion to Judaism for non-Israelites in Biblical times necessitated circumcision, otherwise one could not partake in the Passover offering.

As found in Genesis 17:1–14, brit milah is considered to be so important that should the eighth day fall on the Sabbath, actions that would normally be forbidden because of the sanctity of the day are permitted in order to fulfill the requirement to circumcise. The Talmud, when discussing the importance of Milah, compares it to being equal to all other mitzvot (commandments) based on the gematria for brit of 612.

Covenants in biblical times were often sealed by severing an animal, with the implication that the party who breaks the covenant will suffer a similar fate. In Hebrew, the verb meaning "to seal a covenant" translates literally as "to cut". It is presumed by Jewish scholars that the removal of the foreskin symbolically represents such a sealing of the covenant.

Speculated reasons for biblical circumcision include to show off "patrilineal descent, sexual fertility, male initiation, cleansing of birth impurity, and dedication to God".

== Ceremony ==
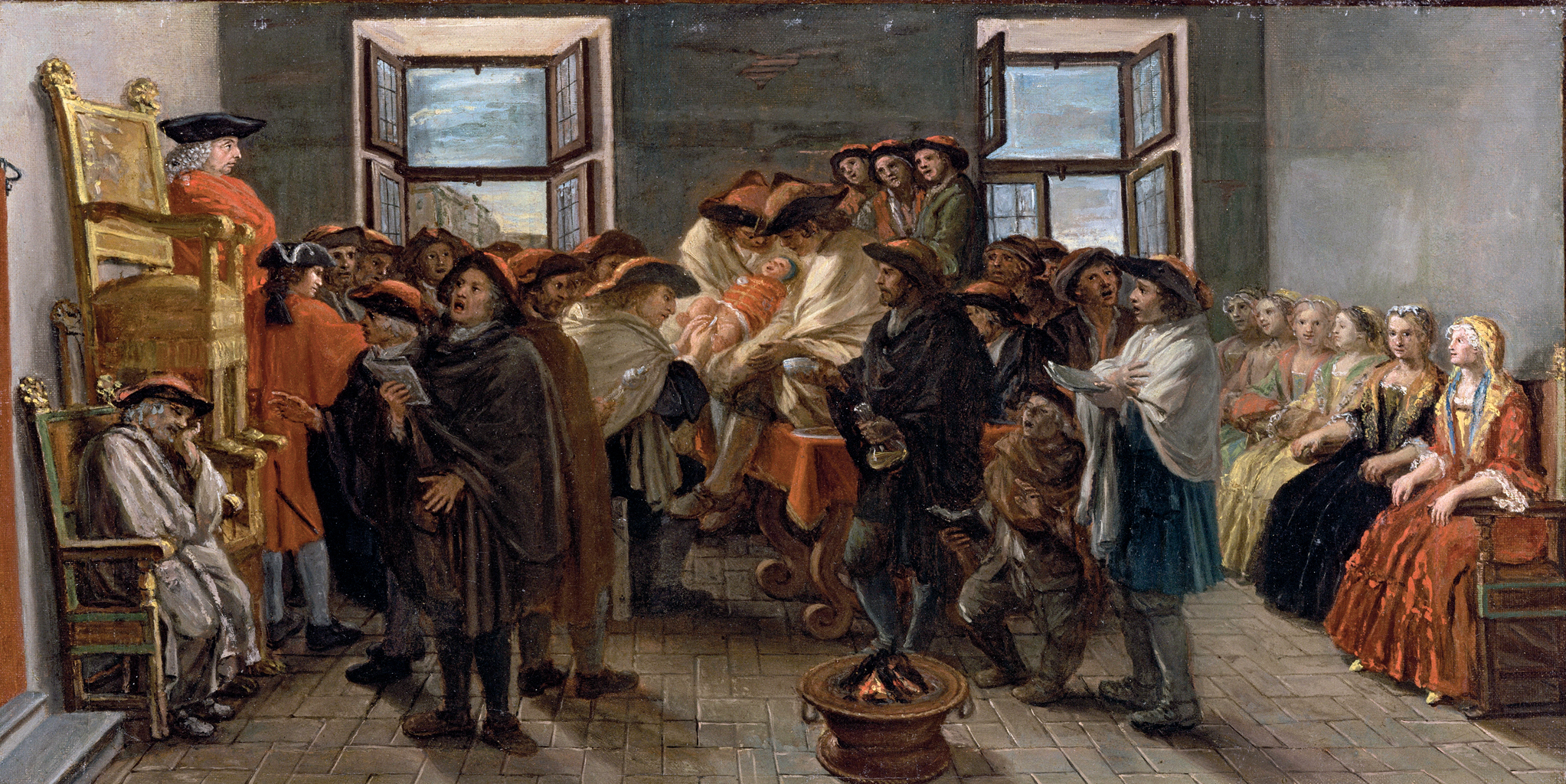
Jewish circumcision in Venice around 1780, Musée d'Art et d'Histoire du Judaïsme, Paris

=== Mohalim ===
Mohalim are Jews trained in the practice of brit milah, the "covenant of circumcision". According to traditional Jewish law, in the absence of a grown free Jewish male expert, anyone who has the required skills is also authorized to perform the circumcision, if they are Jewish. Yet, most streams of non-Orthodox Judaism allow women to be mohalot (Hebrew: מוֹהֲלוֹת, plural of מוֹהֶלֶת mohelet, feminine of mohel), without restriction. In 1984, Deborah Cohen became the first certified Reform mohelet; she was certified by the brit milah program of Reform Judaism.

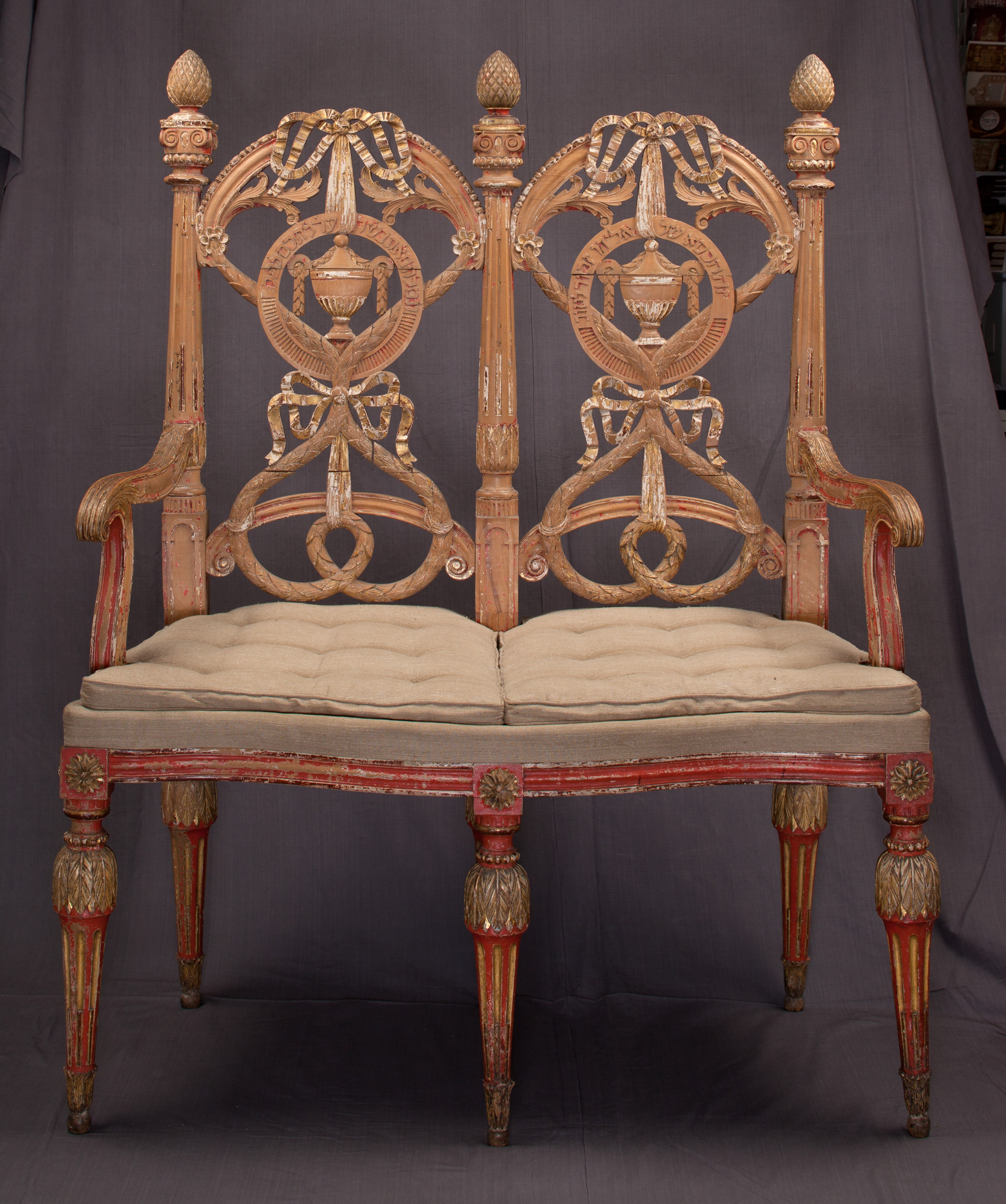
Circumcision bench, 18th century. Jewish Museum of Switzerland.

=== Time and place ===
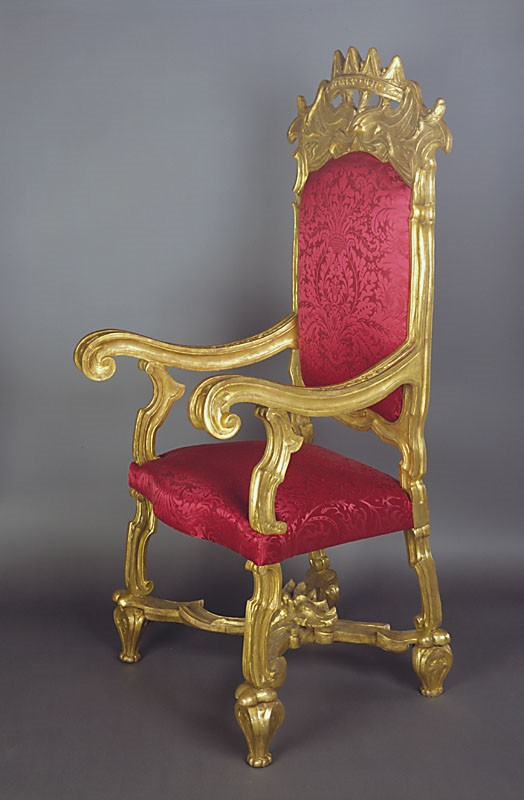
Chair of Elijah used during the brit milah ceremony, Musée d'Art et d'Histoire du Judaïsme

It is customary for the brit to be held in a synagogue, but it can also be held at home or any other suitable location. The brit is performed on the eighth day from the baby's birth, taking into consideration that according to the Jewish calendar, the day begins at the sunset of the day before. If the baby is born on Sunday before sunset, the brit will be held the following Sunday. However, if the baby is born on Sunday night after sunset, the brit is on the following Monday. The brit takes place on the eighth day following birth even if that day is Shabbat or a holiday; however, if the baby is born on Friday night between sunset and nightfall, the briti is delayed until the following Sunday. Furthermore, the brit is performed on the Sabbath only if it is a natural birth; if the birth is a Caesarean section, the brit is delayed until the Sunday. A brit is traditionally performed in the morning, but it may be performed any time during daylight hours.

==== Health exemptions ====
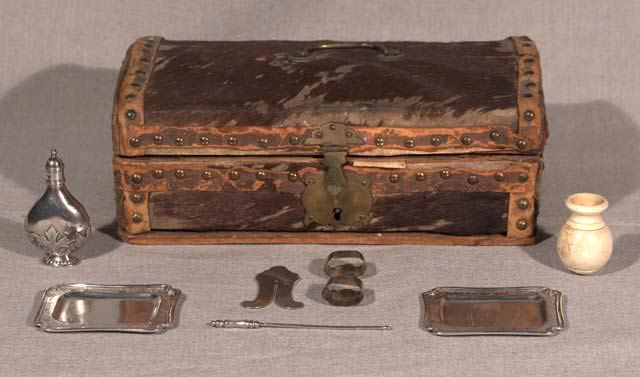
Family circumcision set and trunk, c. eighteenth century. Wooden box covered in cow hide with silver implements: silver trays, clip, pointer, silver flask, spice vessel.

The Talmud states that, if a woman's first two male children die of complications from circumcision, her third male child is exempt from brit milah. This exception to a normally compulsory circumcision may have been created as a response to children with hemophilia bleeding to death following the procedure.

The Mishnah prohibits the circumcision of a sick infant and mandates the postponement of brit milah until said infant recovers. There has been debate amongst Jewish scholars and religious authorities over how long to wait to perform a circumcision following recovery, with the general consensus being that conditions labeled choli shebechol haguf ("systemic disease") require a seven-day post-recovery waiting period and those labeled be'echad me'eivarav ("local illness") require none. There has also been debate over how to classify certain medical conditions using this binary and at what juncture a person should be considered recovered.

==== Adult circumcision ====
In the Soviet Union religious circumcision was banned; many Jews who emigrated, uncircumcised, from the Soviet Union chose to be circumcised as adults. In such cases, the brit milah will be done at the earliest date that can be arranged. The actual circumcision will be private, and other elements of the ceremony (e.g., the celebratory meal) may be modified to accommodate the desires of the one being circumcised.

==== Circumcision for the dead ====
According to halakha, a male who dies before the eighth day of life must be circumcised before burial. However, some Jewish scholars and religious authorities have concluded that the post-mortem circumcision of a male of any age is not compulsory and should not be performed without familial consent.

=== Anesthetic ===
Most prominent acharonim rule that the mitzvah of brit milah lies in the pain it causes, and anesthetic, sedation, or ointment should generally not be used. However, it is traditional to feed the infant a drop of wine or other sweet liquid to soothe him.

Eliezer Waldenberg, Yechiel Yaakov Weinberg, Shmuel Wosner, Moshe Feinstein and others agree that the child should not be sedated, although pain relieving ointment may be used under certain conditions; Shmuel Wosner particularly asserts that the act ought to be painful, per Psalm 44:23.

In a letter to the editor published in The New York Times on January 3, 1998, Orthodox Rabbi Moshe David Tendler wrote, "It is a biblical prohibition to cause anyone unnecessary pain." In said letter, Tendler claimed that the speed at which mohels removed the foreskin (when compared to circumcisions performed in a medical setting) made numbing injections unnecessary and recommended the use of a lidocaine-based analgesic cream as an alternative. However, a 2026 meta-analysis published in the Journal of Perinatology found that a dorsal penile nerve block was substantially more effective in reducing pain experienced during neonatal circumcision than analgesic creams alone (including lidocaine-based creams). These findings were consistent with a meta-analysis published in the Cochrane Database of Systematic Reviews in 2004.

=== Kvater ===
The title of kvater (Yiddish: קוואַטער) among Ashkenazi Jews is for the person who carries the baby from the mother to the father, who in turn carries him to the mohel. This honor is usually given to a couple without children, as a merit or segula (efficacious remedy) that they should have children of their own. The origin of the term is Middle High German gevater/gevatere ("godfather").

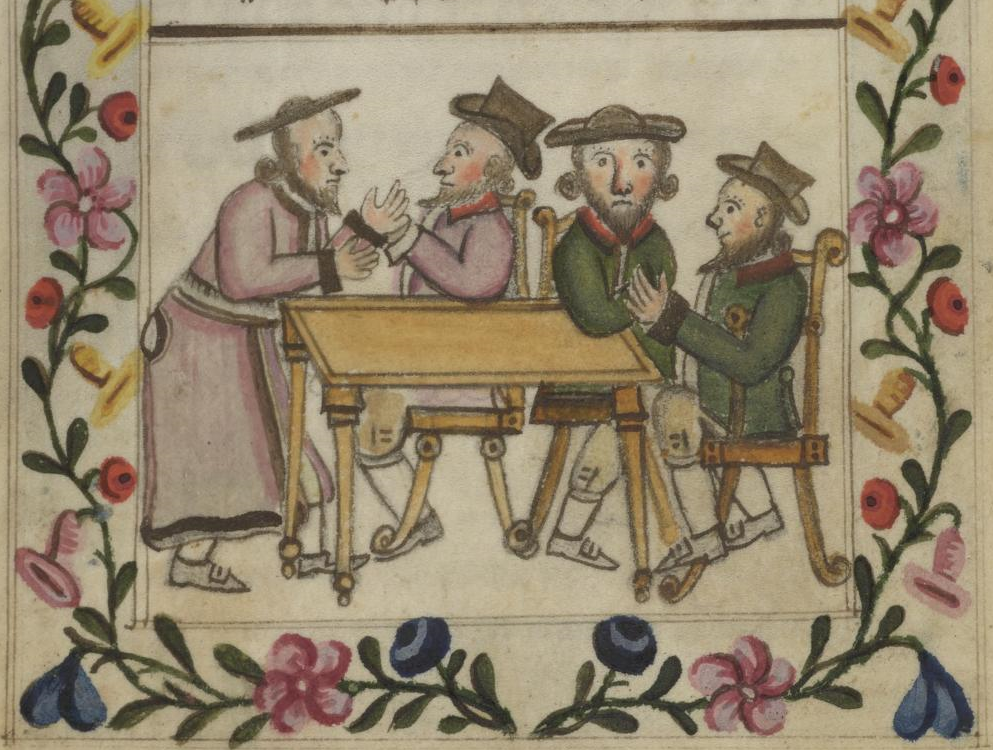
Seudat Mitzah at a brit (1824 Czechia)

=== Seudat mitzvah ===
After the ceremony, a celebratory meal takes place. At the birkat hamazon, according to the Eastern Asheknazic rite, additional introductory lines, known as Nodeh Leshimcha, are added. These lines praise God and request the permission of God, the Torah, Kohanim and distinguished people present to proceed with the grace. When the four main blessings are concluded, special ha-Rachaman prayers are recited. They request various blessings by God that include:

1. the parents of the baby, to help them raise him wisely;
2. the sandek (companion of child);
3. the baby boy to have strength and grow up to trust in God and perceive Him three times a year;
4. the mohel for unhesitatingly performing the ritual;
5. to send the Messiah in Judaism speedily in the merit of this mitzvah;
6. to send Elijah the prophet, known as "The Righteous Kohen", so that God's covenant can be fulfilled with the re-establishment of the throne of King David.

According to the Western Ashkenazic rite, Nodeh Leshimcha is not recited. Elohim tzivita li-yedidcha bechiracha is recited during the second blessing, and a set of ha-Rachaman prayers, different from the ones in the Eastern Ashkenazic rite, are recited.

== Ritual components ==
=== Uncovering, priah ===
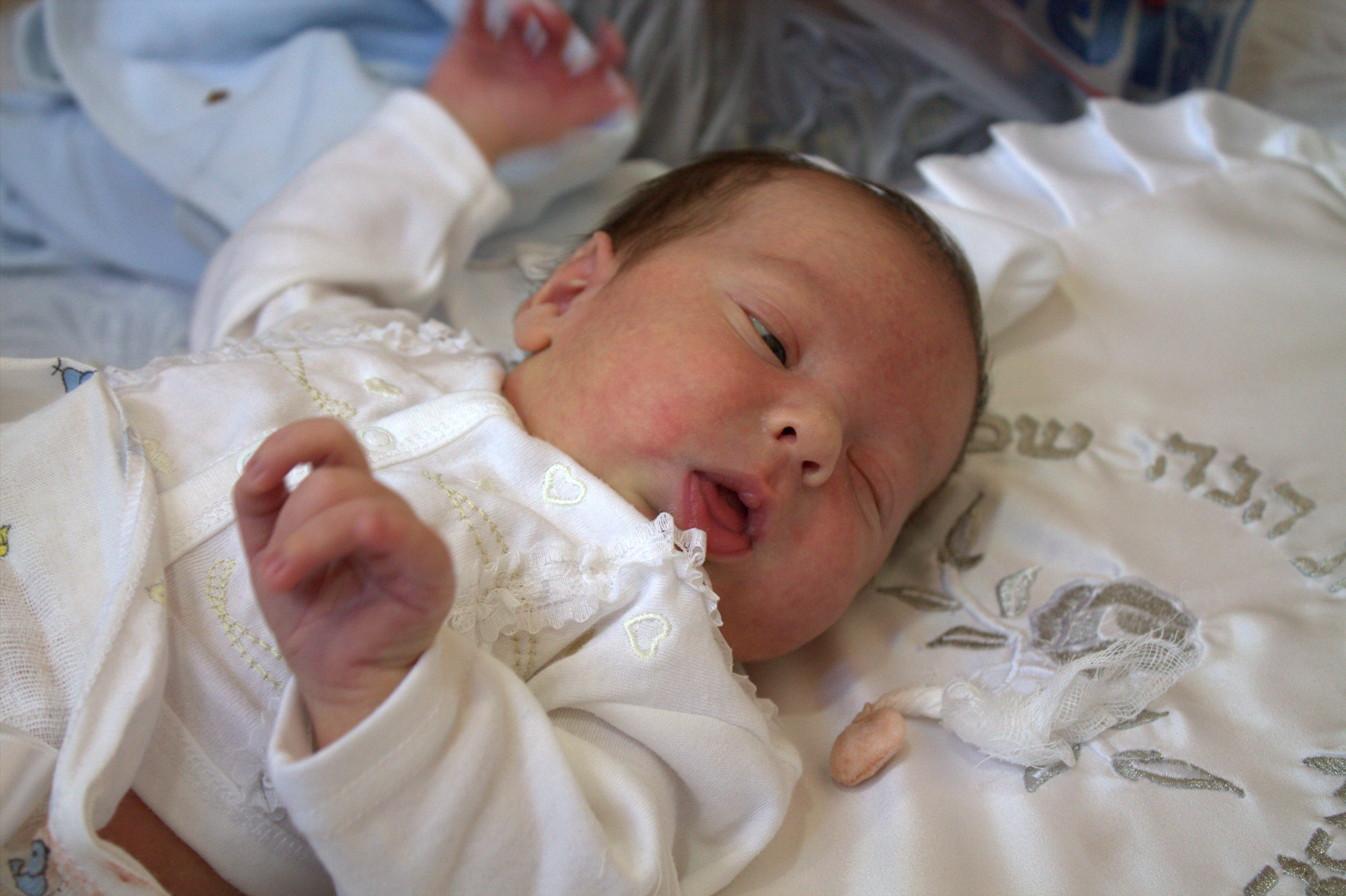
Infant after brit

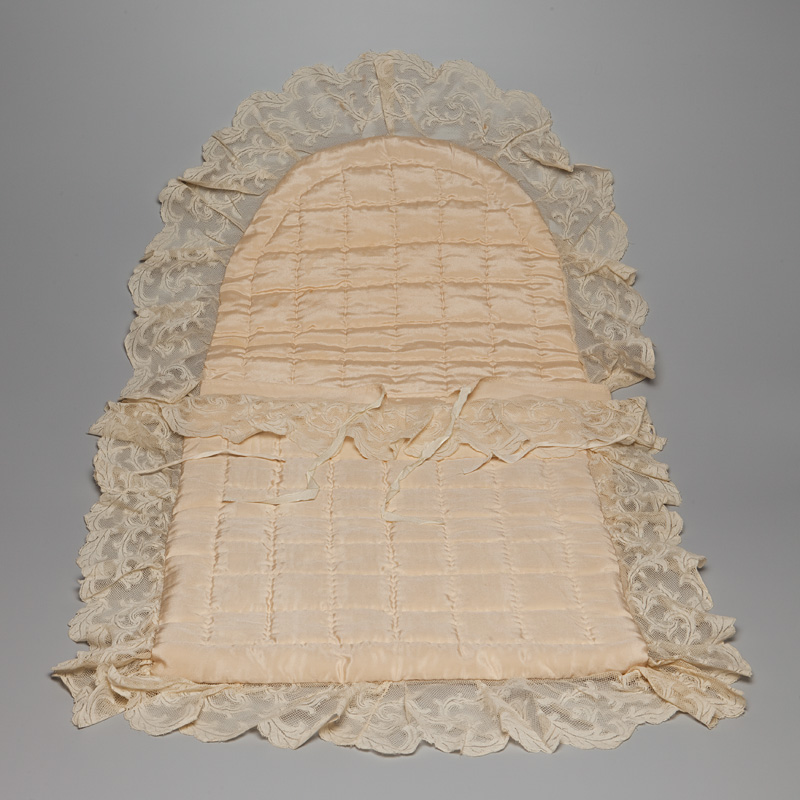
Circumcision cushion, Jewish Museum of Switzerland

At the neonatal stage, the inner preputial epithelium is still linked with the surface of the glans. The mitzvah is executed only when this epithelium is either removed, or permanently peeled back to uncover the glans. On medical circumcisions performed by surgeons, the epithelium is removed along with the foreskin, to prevent post operative penile adhesion and its complications. However, on ritual circumcisions performed by a mohel, the epithelium is most commonly peeled off only after the foreskin has been amputated. This procedure is called priah (Hebrew: פריעה), which means 'uncovering'. The main goal of "priah" (also known as "bris periah"), is to remove as much of the inner layer of the foreskin as possible and prevent the movement of the shaft skin, which creates the look and function of what is known as a "low and tight" circumcision.

According to Rabbinic interpretation of traditional Jewish sources, the 'priah' has been performed as part of the Jewish circumcision since the Israelites first inhabited the Land of Israel.

The Oxford Dictionary of the Jewish Religion states that many Hellenistic Jews attempted to restore their foreskins, and that similar action was taken during the Hadrianic persecution, a period in which a prohibition against circumcision was issued. The writers of the dictionary hypothesize that the more severe method practiced today was probably begun in order to prevent the possibility of restoring the foreskin after circumcision, and therefore the rabbis added the requirement of cutting the foreskin in periah.

According to Shaye J. D. Cohen, the Torah only commands milah. David Gollaher has written that the rabbis added the procedure of priah to discourage men from trying to restore their foreskins: "Once established, priah was deemed essential to circumcision; if the mohel failed to cut away enough tissue, the operation was deemed insufficient to comply with God's covenant", and "Depending on the strictness of individual rabbis, boys (or men thought to have been inadequately cut) were subjected to additional operations."

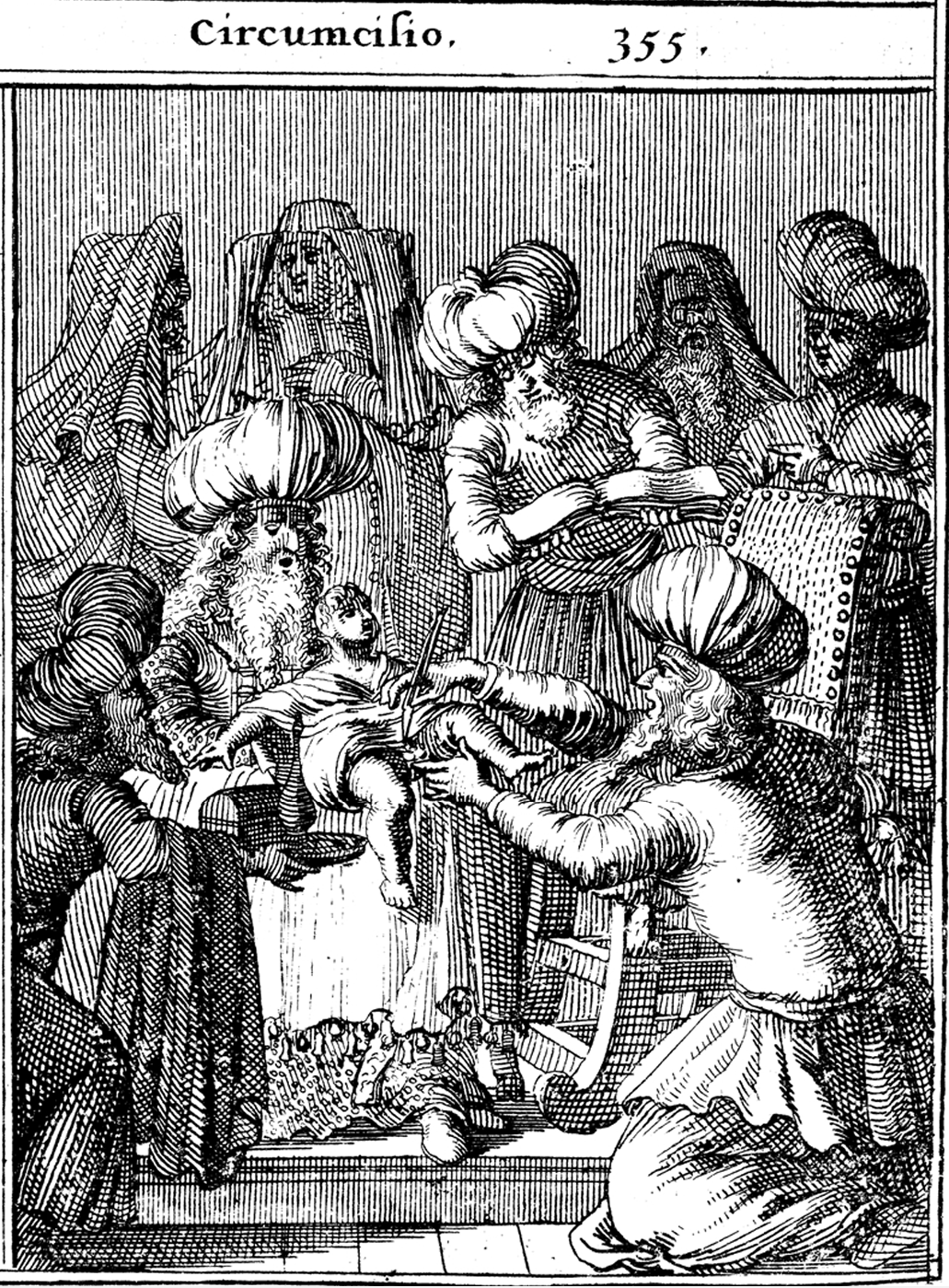
Engraving of a brit (1657)

=== Metzitzah ===
note: alternate spellings Metzizah or Metsitsah are also used to refer to this.

In the Metzitzah (Hebrew: מְצִיצָה), the guard is slid over the foreskin as close to the glans as possible to allow for maximum removal of the former without any injury to the latter. A scalpel is used to detach the foreskin. A tube is used for metzitzah in addition to milah (the initial cut amputating the akroposthion) and p'riah and subsequent circumcision, mentioned above, the Talmud (Mishnah Shabbat 19:2) mentions a third step, metzitzah, translated as suction, as one of the steps involved in the circumcision rite. The Talmud writes that a "Mohel (Circumciser) who does not suck creates a danger, and should be dismissed from practice". Rashi on that Talmudic passage explains that this step is in order to draw some blood from deep inside the wound to prevent danger to the baby. Kabbalists, Rabbi Shalom Sharabi and Rabbi Isaac Luria, have written that he that performs metzitzah ought to cognizantly endeavor to draw away the 'evil inclination' that lay within the blood that is extracted.

There are other modern antiseptic and antibiotic techniques—all used as part of the brit milah today—which many say accomplish the intended purpose of metzitzah; however, since metzitzah is one of the four steps to fulfill the mitzvah, it continues to be practiced by Orthodox Jews. while traditional Karaites and Beta Israel never practiced it due to never incorporating the Talmud.

==== Metzitzah B'Peh (oral suction) ====
The traditional method of performing metzitzah b'peh (Hebrew: מְצִיצָה בְּפֶה, abbreviated as MBP)—or oral suction—has been controversial since the mid-19th century; at that time leading rabbinical authorities ruled that metzitzah could be conducted by instrumental suction. The process has the mohel place his mouth directly on the infant's genital wound to suck blood away from the cut. Most circumcision ceremonies no longer use metzitzah b'peh, but a small minority of certain sects of Haredi Jews continue to perform it, although even among most Haredim the practice is not practiced and looked down upon. In the middle of the 19th century it was recognized that cases of syphilis, tuberculosis, and diphtheria were being transmitted between mohel and infant by this procedure. The practice also poses a risk of spreading herpes to the infant. Proponents maintain that there is no conclusive evidence that links herpes to Metzitza, and that attempts to limit this practice infringe on religious freedom.

The practice has become a controversy in both secular and Jewish medical ethics. The ritual of metzitzah is found in Mishnah Shabbat 19:2, which lists it as one of the four steps involved in the circumcision rite. Rabbi Moses Sofer, also known as the Chatam Sofer (1762–1839), observed that the Talmud states that the rationale for this part of the ritual was hygienic, to protect the health of the child. Consequently the Chatam Sofer issued a ruling to perform metzitzah with a sponge instead of oral suction in order to safeguard the child from potential risks. He also cited a passage in Nedarim 32a as a warrant for the position that metzitzah b’peh was not an obligatory part of the circumcision ceremony. It relates the story that a mohel (who was suspected of transmitting herpes via metzizah to infants) was checked several times and never found to have signs of the disease and that a ban was requested because of the "possibility of future infections". Moshe Schick (1807–1879), a student of Moses Sofer, states in his book of Responsa, She’eilos u’teshuvos Maharam Schick (Orach Chaim 152,) that Moses Sofer gave the ruling in that specific instance only because the mohel refused to step down and had secular government connections that prevented his removal in favor of another mohel, and the Heter may not be applied elsewhere. He also states (Yoreh Deah 244) that the practice is possibly a Sinaitic tradition, i.e., Halacha l'Moshe m'Sinai. Other sources contradict this claim, with copies of Moses Sofer's responsa making no mention of the legal case or of his ruling applying in only one situation. Rather, that responsa makes quite clear that "metzizah" was a health measure and should never be employed where there is a health risk to the infant.

Chaim Hezekiah Medini, after corresponding with the greatest Jewish sages of the generation, concluded the practice to be Halacha l'Moshe m'Sinai and elaborates on what prompted Moses Sofer to give the above ruling. He tells the story that a student of Moses Sofer, Lazar Horowitz, Chief Rabbi of Vienna at the time and author of the responsa Yad Elazer, needed the ruling because of a governmental attempt to ban circumcision completely if it included metztitzah b'peh. He therefore asked Sofer to give him permission to do brit milah without metzitzah b'peh. When he presented the defense in secular court, his testimony was erroneously recorded to mean that Sofer stated it as a general ruling. The Rabbinical Council of America (RCA), which claims to be the largest American organization of Orthodox rabbis, published an article by mohel Yehudi Pesach Shields in its summer 1972 issue of Tradition magazine, calling for the abandonment of Metzitzah b'peh. Since then the RCA has issued an opinion that advocates methods that do not involve contact between the mohel's mouth and the infant's genitals, such as the use of a sterile syringe, thereby eliminating the risk of infection. According to the first Ashkenazic Chief Rabbi of the State of Israel, metzitzah b'peh should not be performed, stating in a 1955 letter that "anyone who insists that metzitza must be done by mouth only, is in my opinion, mistaken and is leading others astray in a matter where there is a possibility of danger."

The argument by some ultra-Orthodox Jewish sects that oral suction is a necessary part of Jewish ritual circumcision has been countered by citing the Jewish doctrine that preserving the life and health of a person is paramount above other rules, so that protecting newborns from the risk of infection overrides the need to observe ritual.

Researchers in Israel reported eight cases of baby boys becoming infected with the herpes simplex virus type 1 (HSV-1) after direct oral-genital contact between the infant and a religious circumciser; one suffered brain damage. When three New York City infants contracted herpes after metzizah b'peh by one mohel and one of them died, New York authorities took out a restraining order against the mohel requiring use of a sterile glass tube, or pipette. The mohel's attorney argued that the New York Department of Health had not supplied conclusive medical evidence linking his client with the disease. In September 2005, the city withdrew the restraining order and turned the matter over to a rabbinical court. Thomas Frieden, the Health Commissioner of New York City, wrote, "There exists no reasonable doubt that 'metzitzah b'peh' can and has caused neonatal herpes infection....The Health Department recommends that infants being circumcised not undergo metzitzah b'peh." In May 2006, the Department of Health for New York State issued a protocol for the performance of metzitzah b'peh. Antonia Novello, Commissioner of Health for New York State, together with a board of rabbis and doctors, worked, she said, to "allow the practice of metzizah b'peh to continue while still meeting the Department of Health's responsibility to protect the public health". Later in New York City in 2012 a 2-week-old baby died of herpes because of metzitzah b'peh.

In three medical papers done in Israel, Canada, and the US, oral suction following circumcision was suggested as a cause in 11 cases of neonatal herpes. Researchers noted that prior to 1997, neonatal herpes reports in Israel were rare, and that the late instances were correlated with the mothers carrying the virus themselves. Rabbi Doctor Mordechai Halperin implicates the "better hygiene and living conditions that prevail among the younger generation", which lowered to 60% the rate of young Israeli Haredi mothers who carry the virus. He explains that an "absence of antibodies in the mothers' blood means that their newborn sons received no such antibodies through the placenta, and therefore are vulnerable to infection by HSV-1".

==== Barriers ====
Because of the risk of infection, some rabbinical authorities have ruled that the traditional practice of direct contact should be replaced by using a sterile tube between the wound and the mohel's mouth, so there is no direct oral contact. The Rabbinical Council of America, the largest group of Modern Orthodox rabbis, endorses this method. The RCA paper states: "Rabbi Schachter even reports that Rav Yosef Dov Soloveitchik reports that his father, Rav Moshe Soloveitchik, would not permit a mohel to perform metzitza be’peh with direct oral contact, and that his grandfather, Rav Chaim Soloveitchik, instructed mohelim in Brisk not to do metzitza be’peh with direct oral contact. However, although Rav Yosef Dov Soloveitchik also generally prohibited metzitza be’peh with direct oral contact, he did not ban it by those who insisted upon it." The sefer Mitzvas Hametzitzah by Rabbi Sinai Schiffer of Baden, Germany, states that he is in possession of letters from 36 major Russian (Lithuanian) rabbis that categorically prohibit Metzitzah with a sponge and require it to be done orally. Among them is Rabbi Chaim Halevi Soloveitchik of Brisk.

In September 2012, the New York Department of Health unanimously ruled that the practice of metztizah b'peh should require informed consent from the parent or guardian of the child undergoing the ritual. Prior to the ruling, several hundred rabbis, including Rabbi David Niederman, the executive director of the United Jewish Organization of Williamsburg, signed a declaration stating that they would not inform parents of the potential dangers that came with metzitzah b'peh, even if informed consent became law.

In a motion for preliminary injunction with intent to sue, filed against New York City Department of Health & Mental Hygiene, affidavits by Awi Federgruen, Brenda Breuer, and Daniel S. Berman argued that the study on which the department passed its conclusions is flawed.

The "informed consent" regulation was challenged in court. In January 2013 the U.S. District court ruled that the law did not specifically target religion and therefore must not pass strict scrutiny. The ruling was appealed to the Court of Appeals.

On August 15, 2014, the Second Circuit Court of Appeals reversed the decision by the lower court, and ruled that the regulation does have to be reviewed under strict scrutiny to determine whether it infringes on Orthodox Jews' freedom of religion.

On September 9, 2015, after coming to an agreement with the community the New York City Board of Health voted to repeal the informed consent regulation.

=== Hatafat dam brit ===
A brit milah is more than circumcision; it is a sacred ritual in Judaism, as distinguished from its non-ritual requirement in Islam. One ramification is that the brit is not considered complete unless a drop of blood is actually drawn. The standard medical methods of circumcision through constriction do not meet the requirements of the halakhah for brit milah, because they are done with hemostasis, i.e., they stop the flow of blood. Moreover, circumcision alone, in the absence of the brit milah ceremony, does not fulfill the requirements of the mitzvah. Therefore, in cases involving a Jew who was circumcised outside of a brit milah, an already-circumcised convert, or an aposthetic (born without a foreskin) individual, the mohel draws a symbolic drop of blood (Hebrew: הטפת דם, hatafat-dam) from the penis at the point where the foreskin would have been or was attached.

== Milah L'shem Giur ==
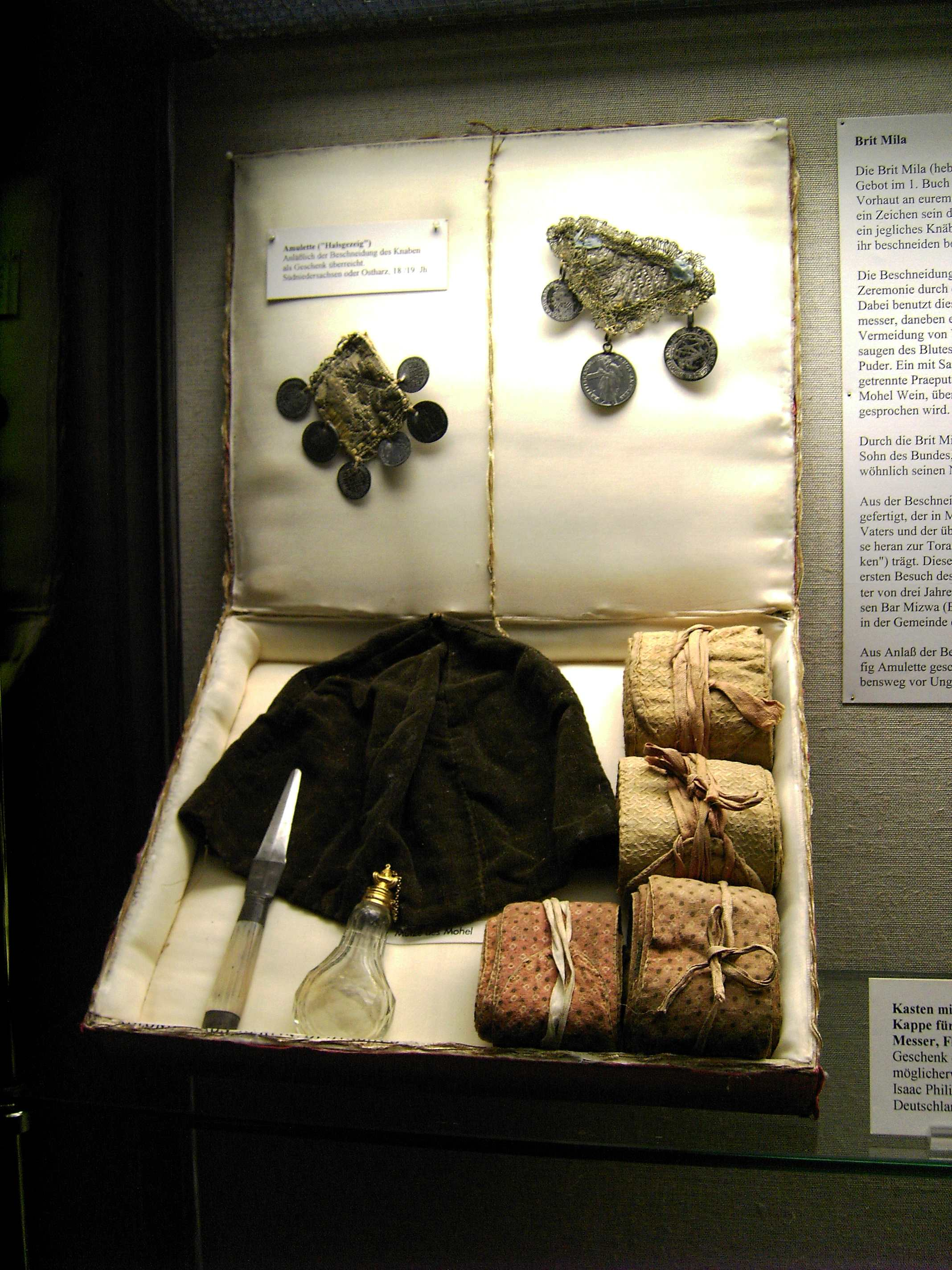
Set of brit milah implements, Göttingen city museum, Germany

A milah l'shem giur is a "circumcision for the purpose of conversion". In Orthodox Judaism, this procedure is usually done by adoptive parents for adopted boys who are being converted as part of the adoption or by families with young children converting together. It is also required for adult converts who were not previously circumcised, e.g., those born in countries where circumcision at birth is not common. The conversion of a minor is valid in both Orthodox and Conservative Judaism until a child reaches the age of majority (13 for a boy, 12 for a girl); at that time the child has the option of renouncing his conversion and Judaism, and the conversion will then be considered retroactively invalid. He must be informed of his right to renounce his conversion if he wishes. If he does not make such a statement, it is accepted that the boy is halakhically Jewish. Orthodox rabbis will generally not convert a non-Jewish child raised by a mother who has not converted to Judaism.

The laws of conversion and conversion-related circumcision in Orthodox Judaism have numerous complications, and authorities recommend that a rabbi be consulted well in advance.

In Conservative Judaism, the milah l'shem giur procedure is also performed for a boy whose mother has not converted, but with the intention that the child be raised Jewish. This conversion of a child to Judaism without the conversion of the mother is allowed by Conservative interpretations of halakha. Conservative Rabbis will authorize it only under the condition that the child be raised as a Jew in a single-faith household. Should the mother convert, and if the boy has not yet reached his third birthday, the child may be immersed in the mikveh with the mother, after the mother has already immersed, to become Jewish. If the mother does not convert, the child may be immersed in a mikveh, or body of natural waters, to complete the child's conversion to Judaism. This can be done before the child is even one year old. If the child did not immerse in the mikveh, or the boy was too old, then the child may choose of their own accord to become Jewish at age 13 as a Bar Mitzvah, and complete the conversion then.

- The ceremony, when performed l'shem giur, does not have to be performed on a particular day, and does not override Shabbat and Jewish Holidays.
- In Orthodox Judaism, there is a split of authorities on whether the child receives a Hebrew name at the Brit ceremony or upon immersion in the Mikvah. According to Zichron Brit LeRishonim, naming occurs at the Brit with a different formula than the standard Brit Milah. The more common practice among Ashkenazic Jews follows Rabbi Moshe Feinstein, with naming occurring at immersion.

Where the procedure was performed but not followed by immersion or other requirements of the conversion procedure (e.g., in Conservative Judaism, where the mother has not converted), if the boy chooses to complete the conversion at Bar Mitzvah, a milah l'shem giur performed when the boy was an infant removes the obligation to undergo either a full brit milah or hatafat dam brit.

=== Visible symbol of a covenant ===
Rabbi Saadia Gaon considers something to be "complete" if it lacks nothing, but also has nothing that is unneeded. He regards the foreskin as an unneeded organ that God created in man, and so by amputating it, the man is completed. The author of Sefer ha-Chinuch provides three reasons for the practice of circumcision:

1. To complete the form of man, by removing what he claims to be a redundant organ;
2. To mark the chosen people, so that their bodies will be different as their souls are. The organ chosen for the mark is the one responsible for the sustenance of the species;
3. The completion effected by circumcision is not congenital, but left to the man. This implies that as he completes the form of his body, so can he complete the form of his soul.

Talmud professor Daniel Boyarin offered two explanations for circumcision. One is that it is a literal inscription on the Jewish body of the name of God in the form of the letter "yud" (from "yesod"). The second is that the act of bleeding represents a feminization of Jewish men, significant in the sense that the covenant represents a marriage between Jews and (a symbolically male) God.

=== Other reasons ===
In Of the Special Laws, Book 1, the Jewish philosopher Philo additionally gave other reasons for the practice of circumcision.

He attributes four of the reasons to "men of divine spirit and wisdom". These include the idea that circumcision:

1. Protects against disease,
2. Secures cleanliness "in a way that is suited to the people consecrated to God",
3. Causes the circumcised portion of the penis to resemble a heart, thereby representing a physical connection between the "breath contained within the heart [that] is generative of thoughts, and the generative organ itself [that] is productive of living beings", and
4. Promotes prolificness by removing impediments to the flow of semen.
5. "Is a symbol of a man's knowing himself".

== Judaism, Christianity, and the Early Church (4 BCE – 150 CE) ==
The 1st-century Jewish author Philo Judaeus defended Jewish circumcision on several grounds. He thought that circumcision should be done as early as possible as it would not be as likely to be done by someone's own free will. He claimed that the foreskin prevented semen from reaching the vagina and so should be done as a way to increase the nation's population. He also noted that circumcision should be performed as an effective means to reduce sexual pleasure.

There was also division in Pharisaic Judaism between Hillel the Elder and Shammai on the issue of circumcision of proselytes.

According to the Gospel of Luke, Jesus was circumcised on the 8th day.

After eight days had passed, it was time to circumcise the child; and he was called Jesus, the name given by the angel before he was conceived in the womb.

— Luke 2:21

According to saying 53 of the Gospel of Thomas,

His disciples said to him, "is circumcision useful or not?". He said to them, "If it were useful, their father would produce children already circumcised from their mother. Rather, the true circumcision in spirit has become profitable in every respect."

The foreskin was considered a symbol of beauty, civility, and masculinity throughout the Greco-Roman world; it was customary to spend an hour or so a day exercising nude in the gymnasium and in Roman baths; many Jewish men did not want to be seen in public deprived of their foreskins, where matters of business and politics were discussed. To expose one's glans in public was seen as indecent, vulgar, and a sign of sexual arousal and desire.

Classical, Hellenistic, and Roman culture widely found circumcision to be barbaric, cruel, and utterly repulsive in nature. By the period of the Maccabees, many Jewish men attempted to hide their circumcisions through the process of epispasm, now known as foreskin restoration, due to the circumstances of the period, although Jewish religious writers denounced these practices as abrogating the covenant of Abraham in 1 Maccabees and the Talmud. After Christianity and Second Temple Judaism split apart from one another, Milah was declared spiritually unnecessary as a condition of justification by Christian writers such as Paul the Apostle and subsequently in the Council of Jerusalem, while it further increased in importance for Jews.

In the mid-2nd century CE, the Tannaim, the successors of the newly ideologically dominant Pharisees, introduced and made mandatory a secondary step of circumcision known as the Periah. Without it circumcision was newly declared to have no spiritual value. This new form removed as much of the inner mucosa as possible, the frenulum and its corresponding delta from the penis, and prevented the movement of shaft skin, in what creates a "low and tight" circumcision. It was intended to make it impossible to restore the foreskin. This is the form practiced among the large majority of Jews today, and, later, became a basis for the routine neonatal circumcisions performed in the United States.

The steps, justifications, and imposition of the practice have dramatically varied throughout history; commonly cited reasons for the practice have included it being a way to control male sexuality by reducing sexual pleasure and desire, as a visual marker of the covenant of the pieces, as a metaphor for mankind perfecting creation, and as a means to promote fertility. The original version in Judaic history was either a ritual nick or cut done by a father to the acroposthion, the part of the foreskin that overhangs the glans penis. This form of genital nicking or cutting, known as simply milah, became adopted among Jews by the Second Temple period and was the predominant form until the second century CE. The notion of milah being linked to a biblical covenant is generally believed to have originated in the 6th century BCE as a product of the Babylonian captivity; the practice likely lacked this significance among Jews before the period.

== Reform Judaism ==
The Reform societies established in Frankfurt and Berlin regarded circumcision as barbaric and wished to abolish it. However, while prominent rabbis such as Abraham Geiger believed the ritual to be barbaric and outdated, they refrained from instituting any change in this matter. In 1843, when a father in Frankfurt refused to circumcise his son, rabbis of all shades in Germany stated it was mandated by Jewish law; even Samuel Holdheim affirmed this. By 1871, Reform rabbinic leadership in Germany reasserted "the supreme importance of circumcision in Judaism", while affirming the traditional viewpoint that non-circumcised Jews are Jews nonetheless. Although the issue of circumcision of converts continues to be debated, the necessity of britot milah for Jewish infant boys has been stressed in every subsequent Reform rabbis manual or guide. While the Reform movement does not require the circumcision of adult male converts, it is increasingly acknowledged and practiced by many Reform communities as an important part of the conversion process. Since 1984 Reform Judaism has trained and certified over 300 of their own practicing mohalim in this ritual. By 2001, the Central Conference of American Rabbis began to recommend that male converts who are already circumcised undergo hatafat dam brit.

== In Samaritanism ==
Samaritan brit milah occurs on the eighth day following the child's birth at the father's home. In addition to special prayers and readings from the Torah pertaining to the ritual, an old hymn that invokes blessings for parents and children is sung.

According to British explorer Claude Reignier Conder, in their circumcision hymn, Samaritans express their gratitude for a certain Roman soldier by the name of Germon, who was sent by an unknown Roman Emperor as a sentinel over the home of the Samaritan High Priest for his kindness in allowing the process of circumcision to take place. They tried to give him money, but he refused, just requesting to be included in their future prayers instead.

== See also ==
- Circumcision of Jesus
- Khitan (circumcision)
- History of circumcision
- Zeved habat, a Jewish naming ceremony for newborn girls
