= Aposthia =

Congenital condition in humans where the foreskin is missing

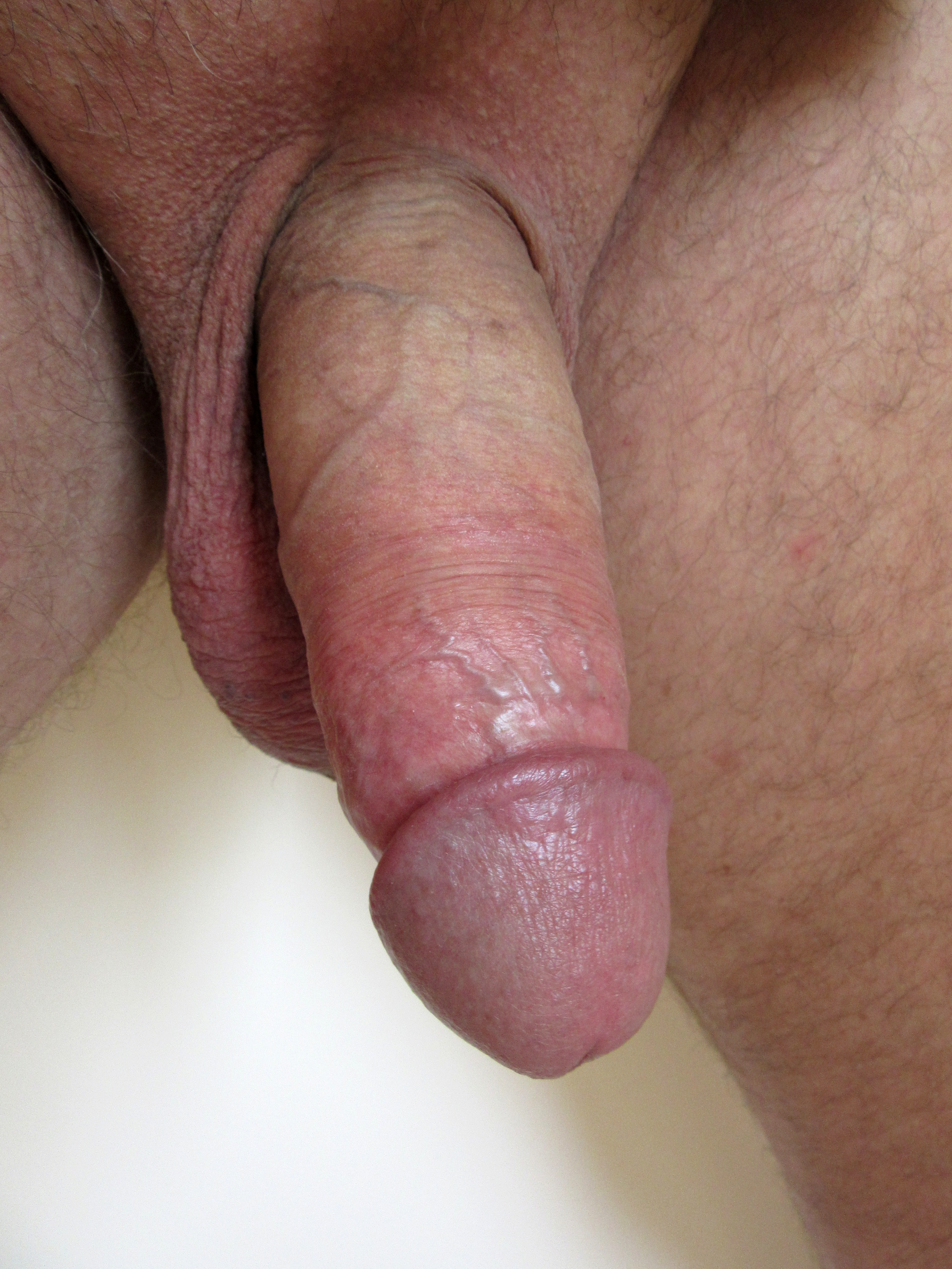
- A human penis with aposthia.
- Specialty: Urology

Aposthia is a rare congenital condition in humans, in which the foreskin of the penis is missing.

Toward the end of the nineteenth century, E. S. Talbot claimed that aposthia among Jews was evidence for the old notion of Lamarckian inheritance. In his work The Variation of Animals and Plants Under Domestication, Charles Darwin mentioned cases of "born circumcised" babies as "conclusive evidence" for the now-discredited blending inheritance. Because hypospadias is a much more common condition, it is likely that those reported cases were not actually aposthia.

== Aposthia in Judaism ==
The Midrash of Ki-Tetze (כי תצא) claims that Moses was born aposthic. Other sources claimed that Jacob, his son Gad and King David were also born aposthic. The book Abot De-Rabbi Natan (The Fathers According to Rabbi Nathan) contains a list of people from Israelite Scriptures who were "born circumcised": Adam, Seth, Noah, Shem, Jacob, Joseph, Moses, the wicked Balaam, Samuel, David, Jeremiah, and Zerubbabel.

Jewish law requires males born without a foreskin or who lost their foreskin through means other than a formal circumcision ceremony (brit milah, ברית מילה) to have a drop of blood (hatafat-dam, הטפת דם) let from the penis at the point where the foreskin would have been (or was) attached. The Talmud (Shabbat 135A) records a discussion of whether the importance of this bloodletting supersedes Shabbat, on which only a boy who was born the previous Shabbat can be circumcised. If a regular circumcision is delayed, this may not be performed on Shabbat. However, aposthia involves two schools of thought.

R. Elazar Hakappar said that the school of Shamai and Hillel do not differ as to a boy that is born without a foreskin. Both agree that the blood of the covenant must be drawn from the glans. The school of Shamai, however, contends that this may be done on the Sabbath, while the other holds that the Sabbath must not be desecrated on that account.

David Levy, former Israeli Foreign Minister and member of Knesset, was born aposthic. Arye Avneri's authorized 1983 biography of Levy notes this:

When David Levy was born ... his mother Sima noticed at once that he was different from other baby boys. He had been born already circumcised, for the foreskin was entirely missing.

The rabbis in Rabat proclaimed that this foretold that Levy would grow up to be a "leader of Israel", even though the State was not founded until Levy was 11, in 1948. This proclamation was not necessarily prophetic, for "Israel" can be used to refer to "the Jewish people".

== Literature ==
Lazarus Long, principal protagonist in several of Robert Heinlein's novels, was born aposthic.

== Sources ==
- Aposthia in Dorland's Medical Dictionary
- Shulchan Aruch, Code of Jewish Law, Yoreh Deah § 263 Law 4 (ש"ע י"ד ס' רס"ג הל' ד).
