= Mucocutaneous junction =

Region where mucosa transitions to skin

A mucocutaneous junction, or mucocutaneous boundary, is a region of the body in which mucosa transitions to skin. Mucocutaneous zones occur in animals, at the body orifices.

In humans, mucocutaneous junctions are found at the lips, nostrils, conjunctivae, urethra, vagina (in females), foreskin (in males), clitoral hood (in females), and anus.

In the nostrils the mucocutaneous junction has a dense microvascular network, and shows a marked similarity to that found in the mouth, between the oral mucosa and the lips.

At a mucocutaneous junction, epithelium transitions to epidermis, lamina propria transitions to dermis, and smooth muscle transitions to skeletal muscle. A mucocutaneous junction is often the site of an arterial anastomosis, a watershed area of venous and lymphatic drainage, and sensory (but not motor) nerve overlap.

Winkelmann (1959) documented that the mucocutaneous boundary is a "specific erogenous zone with rete ridges where the nerve endings rise closer to the surface".
