= Posthitis =

Inflammation of the foreskin of the penis

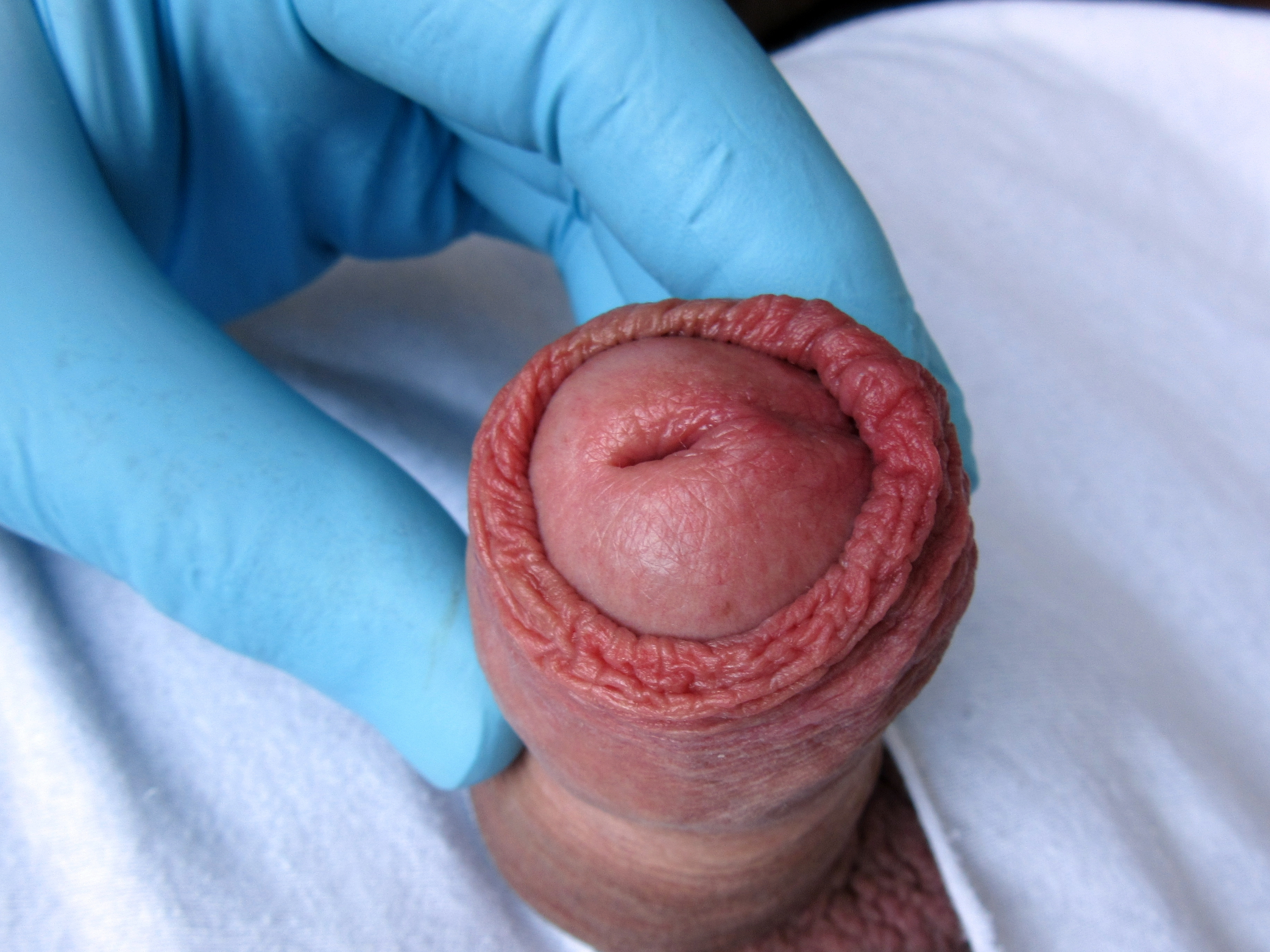
Posthitis

Posthitis is the inflammation of the foreskin (prepuce) of the penis. It is characterised by swelling and redness on the skin and it may be accompanied by a malodorous discharge.

The term posthitis comes from the Greek "posthe", meaning foreskin, and "-itis", meaning inflammation.

== Causes ==
Posthitis can have infectious causes such as bacteria or fungi, or non-infectious causes such as contact dermatitis or psoriasis. The inflammation may be caused by irritants in the environment. Common causative organisms include candida, chlamydia, and gonorrhea. The cause must be properly diagnosed before a treatment can be prescribed. A common risk factor is diabetes.

Posthitis can lead to phimosis, the tightening of the foreskin which makes it difficult to retract over the glans. Posthitis can also lead to superficial ulcerations and diseases of the inguinal lymph nodes.

== Prevention ==
Hygiene, in particular the regular cleaning of the glans, is generally considered sufficient to prevent infection and inflammation of the foreskin. Full retraction of the foreskin may not be possible in boys younger than about ten years and some may not be able to fully retract their foreskin for cleaning until their late teens.

== Treatment ==
If contact dermatitis is suspected, soaps and other external irritants should be discontinued and a latex allergy should be investigated.

The treatment depends on identification of the cause. Irritants in the environment should be removed. Antibiotics and antifungals can be used to treat the infection, but good hygiene such as keeping the area dry is essential to stop recurrence, however excessive washing with soap can cause contact dermatitis.

If infection is sexually transmitted, sexual partners should be notified and treated.

Posthitis and balanitis (inflammation of the glans penis) usually occur together as balanoposthitis. Circumcision can prevent balanoposthitis, though balanitis can still occur separately.
