= Foreskin =

Retractable fold of skin which covers and protects the glans of the penis

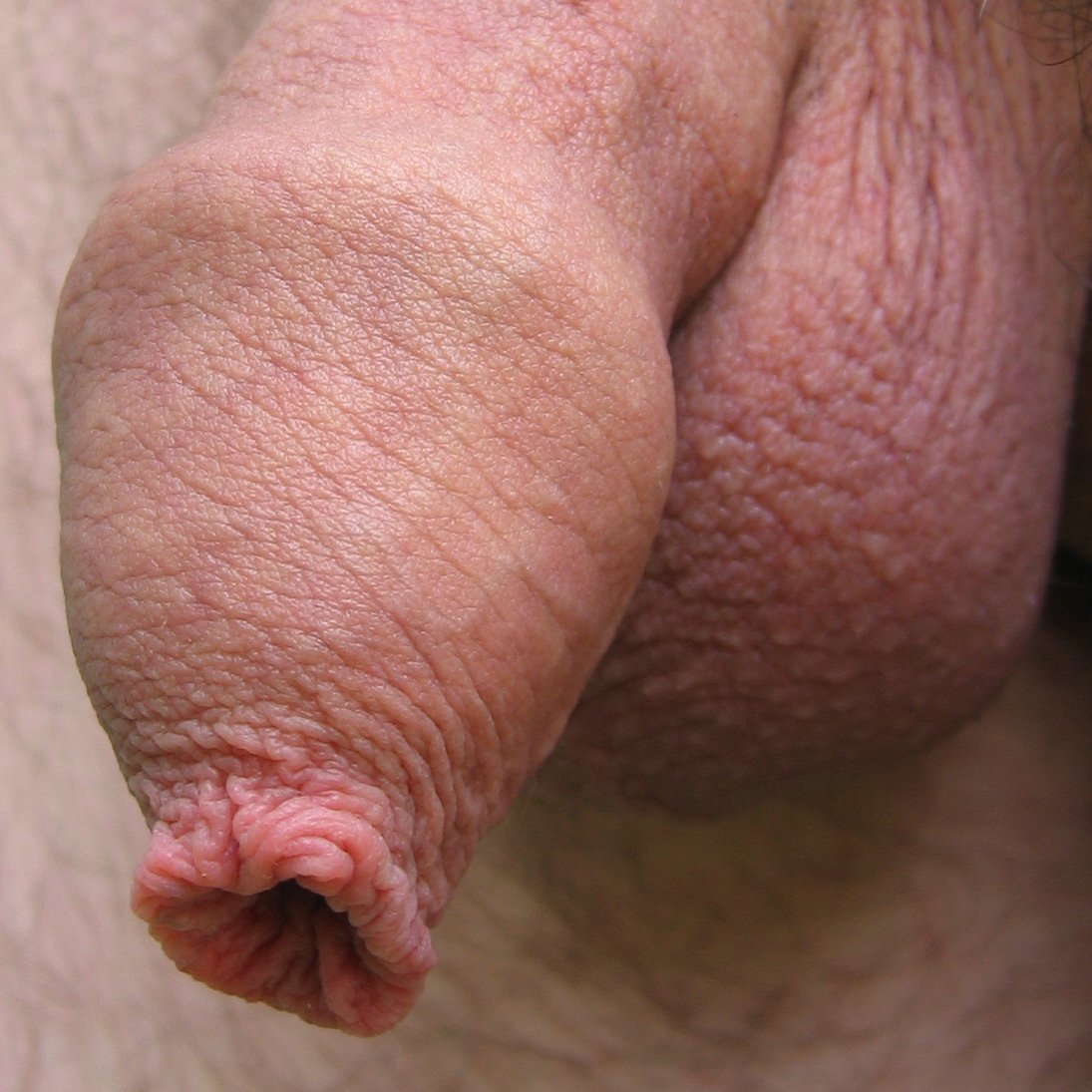
- Human foreskin fully covering the glans penis

Details
- Precursor: Genital tubercle, urogenital folds
- System: Male reproductive system
- Artery: Dorsal artery of the penis
- Vein: Dorsal veins of the penis
- Nerve: Dorsal nerve of the penis

Identifiers
- Latin: praeputium, preputium penis
- MeSH: D052816
- TA98: A09.4.01.011
- TA2: 3675
- FMA: 19639

In male human anatomy, the foreskin, also known as the prepuce (/ˈpriːpjuːs/), is the double-layered fold of skin, mucosal and muscular tissue at the distal end of the human penis that covers the glans and the urinary meatus. The foreskin is attached to the glans by an elastic band of tissue, known as the frenulum. The outer skin of the foreskin meets with the inner preputial mucosa at the area of the mucocutaneous junction. The foreskin is mobile, fairly stretchable and sustains the glans in a moist environment. A similar structure known as a penile sheath appears in the male sexual organs of all primates and the vast majority of mammals.

In humans, foreskin length varies widely and coverage of the glans in a flaccid and erect state can also vary. The foreskin is fused to the glans at birth and is generally not retractable in infancy and early childhood. Inability to retract the foreskin in childhood should not be considered a problem unless there are other symptoms. Retraction of the foreskin is not recommended until it loosens from the glans before or during puberty. In adults, it is typically retractable over the glans, given normal development. The male prepuce is anatomically homologous to the clitoral hood in females. In some cases, the foreskin may become subject to a pathological condition. (Note: Such as phimosis, balanitis, and posthitis)

== Structure ==
=== External ===
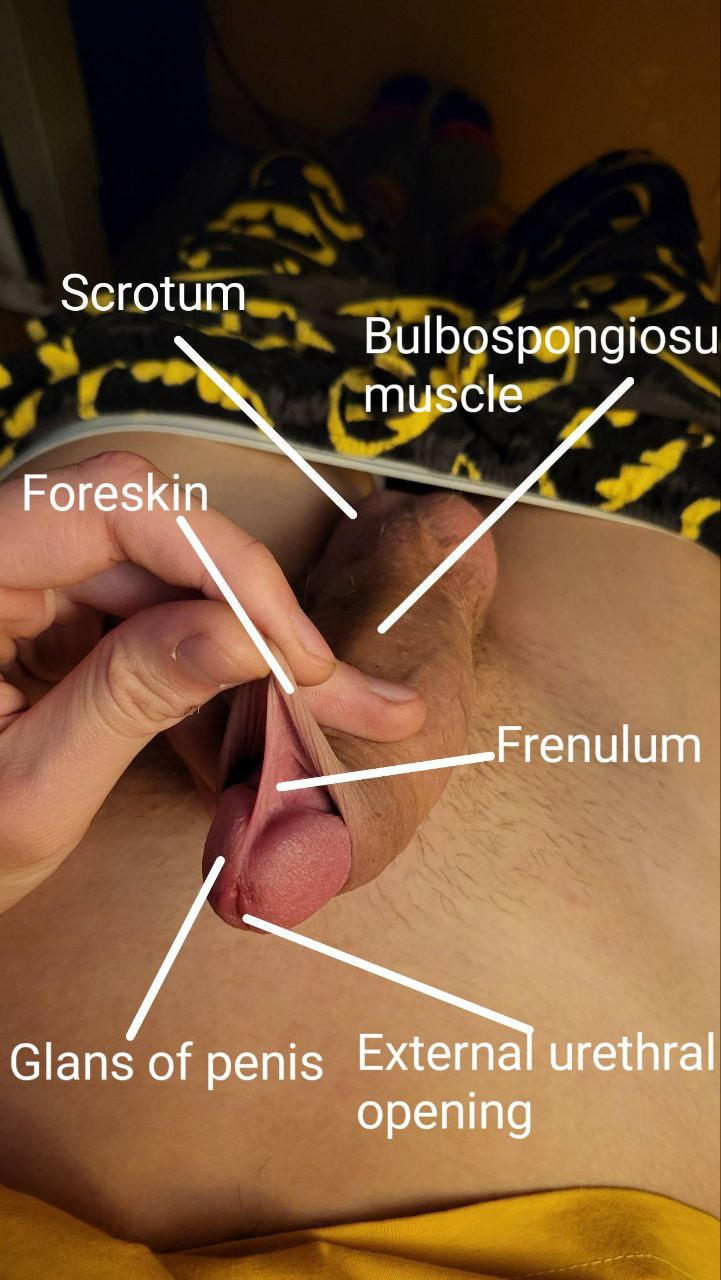
Photo of an erect penis, manipulated to show the frenulum

The outside of the foreskin is a continuation of the shaft skin of the penis and is covered by a keratinized stratified squamous epithelium. The inner foreskin is a continuation of the epithelium that covers the glans and is made up of glabrous squamous mucous membrane, like the inside of the eyelid or the mouth. The mucosal aspect of the prepuce has a great capacity for self-repair. The area of the outer foreskin measures 7–100 cm^{2}, and the inner foreskin measures 18–68 cm.^{2} The mucocutaneous zone occurs where the outer and inner foreskin meet. The foreskin is free to move after it separates from the glans, which usually occurs before or during puberty. The inner foreskin is attached to the glans by the frenulum, a highly vascularized tissue of the penis. The World Health Organization states that "the frenulum forms the interface between the outer and inner foreskin layers, and when the penis is not erect, it tightens to narrow the foreskin opening.

=== Subcutaneous ===
The human foreskin is a laminar structure made up of outer skin, mucosal epithelium, lamina propia, dartos fascia and dermis. The superficial dartos fascia, formerly called the peripenic muscle, is one of the two sheaths of smooth muscle tissue found below the penile skin, along with the underlying Buck's fascia or deep fascia of the penis. The dartos fascia extents within the skin of the prepuce and contains an abundance of elastic fibers. These fibers form a whorl at the tip of the foreskin, known as the preputial orifice, which is narrow during infancy and childhood. The dartos fascia is sensitive to temperature and reacts to temperature changes by expanding and contracting. The fascia is only loosely connected with the underlying tissue, so that it provides the mobility and elasticity of the penile skin. Langerhans cells are immature dendritic cells that are found in all areas of the penile epithelium, but are most superficial in the inner surface of the foreskin.

As a continuation of the human shaft skin, the prepuce receives somatosensory innervation from the bilateral dorsal nerve of the penis and branches of the perineal nerve, and autonomic innervation from the pelvic plexus. The somatosensory receptors that are found in the prepuce are both nociceptors and mechanoreceptors, with a predominace of Meissner's corpuscles. Blood supply to the prepuce is provided by the preputial artery, a division of the axial and dorsal artery of the penis. The axial and dorsal arteries that run within the penile skin unite through perforating branches and give off the preputial arteries before they reach the corona of the glans. The preputial vein, an extension of the superficial dorsal vein, receives blood from the prepuce and connects to the larger dorsal veins of the penis that drain the rest of the penile shaft.

== Development ==
=== Gestation ===
The penis develops from a primordial phallic structure that forms in the embryo during the early weeks of pregnancy, known as the genital tubercle. Initially undifferentiated, the tubercle develops into a penis depending on the exposure to male hormones secreted by the testicles. The differentiation of the external sexual organs will be evident between twelve and sixteen weeks of gestation. Preputial development is initiated at around eleven weeks or earlier and continues up to eighteen weeks.

Historically, the theories regarding the stages of preputial development during gestation fall into two main ideas. The earliest report by Schweigger-Seidel (1866) and later Hunter (1935) suggested the formation of the prepuce out of dorsal skin and its progressive distal extension to completely cover and eventually fuse with the epithelium of the glans. Glenister (1956) expanded the theory suggesting that the preputial fold results as an ingrowth of the cellular lamina, which rolls outwards over the glans, but with the resultant preputial lamina also expanding backwards to form an ingrowing fold at the coronal sulcus.

By eleven and twelve weeks of gestation, the process of preputial formation is evident as a thickening of the epidermis that separates from the penis creating a raised fold, known as the preputial fold. On the underside of this structure forms the preputial lamina, which expands dorsolaterally over the base of the developing glans. At thirteen weeks, the prepuce has not yet extended to the distal tip of the glans covering only a part of its surface. By sixteen weeks, the bilateral preputial folds cover most of the glans and the ventral sides of the prepuce fuse in the midline. The penile raphe, the continuation of the perineal raphe in human males, occurs on the ventral side of the penis as a manifestation of the fusion of the urethral and preputial folds. The dorsal nerve of the penis, which is present as early as nine weeks of gestation, completely expands through branches to the distal end of the glans and prepuce by sixteen weeks. At nineteen weeks, foreskin development is complete. Towards the end of the second trimester, the glans and the prepuce have completely fused together by the preputial, sometimes referred to as balanopreputial lamina. At birth, this shared membrane is physiologically adherent to the glans preventing retraction in infancy and early childhood. The phenomenon of non-retractile foreskin in children naturally starts to resolve in varying ages; in childhood, preadolescence or puberty.

=== Retraction ===
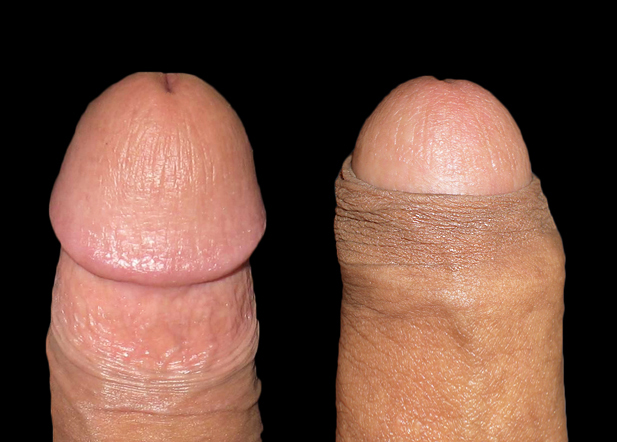
Once the foreskin has naturally separated from the glans, the foreskin's two layers of outer skin and inner mucosa can be retracted to reveal the glans and inner foreskin

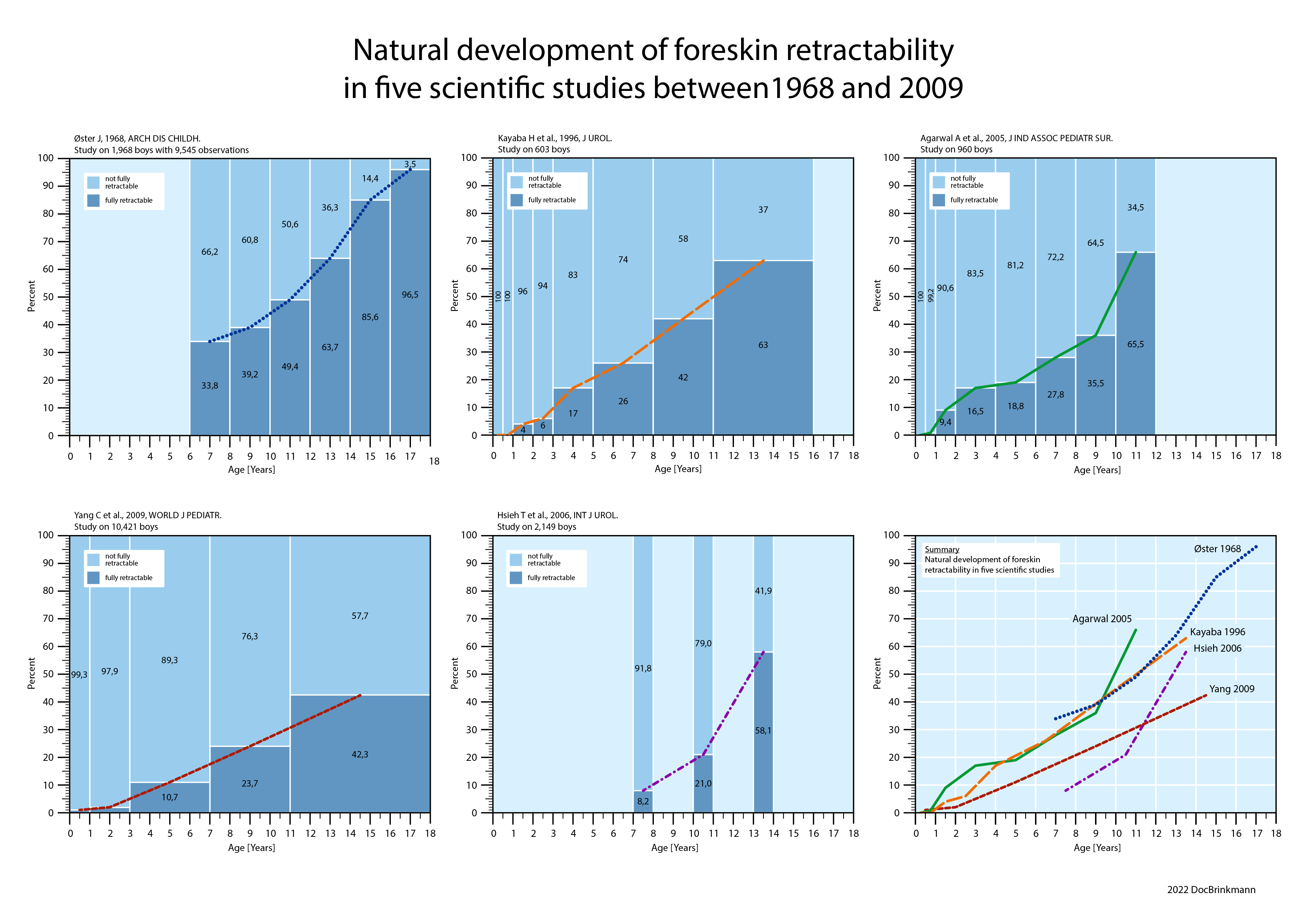
Different studies estimating timing of preputial separation in children and teens

From birth to the first years of life, the inner foreskin is fused to the glans; forced retraction can cause pain or microtearing and is thus not recommended. The foreskin gradually separates from the glans from accumulation of smegma and periodic erections. The phenomenon of nonretractile or tight foreskin in childhood, sometimes referred to as physiologic phimosis, may completely resolve before, during or even after puberty. The reduction of adhesion typically occurs gradually throughout childhood, with younger boys often experiencing adhesions extending to the regions of the glans closer to the urinary meatus; older boys typically experience only isolated thread-like bands. Most boys lose all adhesions between the foreskin and glans by the age of 10-11, but it is not uncommon for adhesions to continue to exist until 14-15.

Retractibility of the foreskin by age group
Age	No foreskin retraction	Some foreskin retraction	Full foreskin retraction
6–7	8%	63%	29%
8–9	6%	58%	36%
10–11	6%	48%	46%
12–13	3%	34%	63%
14–15	1%	13%	86%
16–17	1%	3%	96%

When the foreskin starts to become retractile, a pediatrician can recommend careful retraction at home and rinsing with water during bath. Mild soap may be used, but can be avoided, if it causes irritation. If full retraction is hard to achieve, the child may only wash the exposed area of the glans. Since there is no specific age when non-retractile foreskin begins to resolve, the time of foreskin retraction can vary considerably among children.

During puberty, as the male begins to sexually mature, foreskin retractability gradually increases allowing more comfortable exposure of the glans when needed. Gentle washing under the foreskin during shower and maintaining good genital hygiene is sufficient to prevent smegma buildup. Smegma is an oily secretion in the genitals of both sexes that maintains the moist texture of the mucosal surfaces and prevents friction. In boys, it helps resolve the natural adhension of the glans and inner prepuce and typically increases in frequency around the ages of 12 to 13.

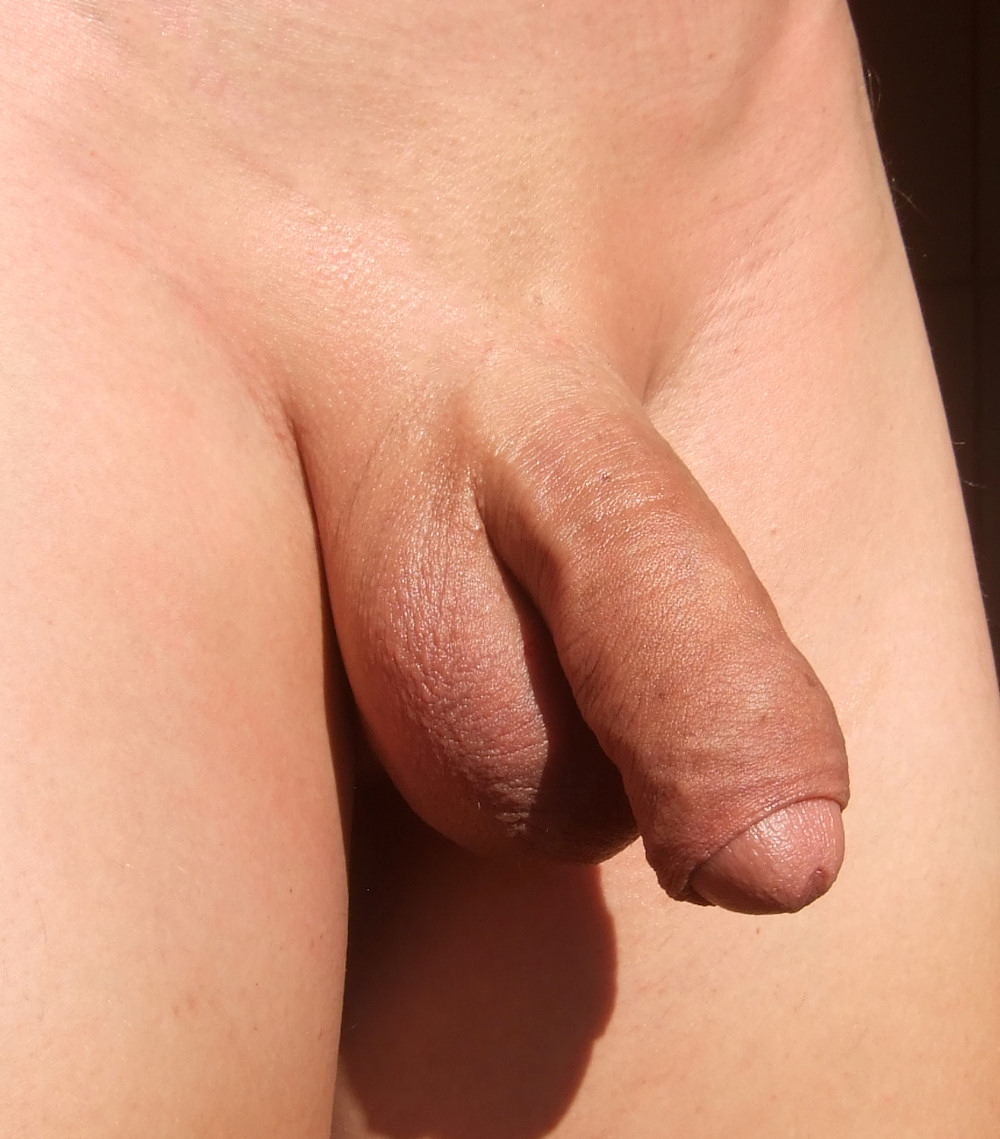
A naturally short foreskin

=== Variability ===
In children, the foreskin usually covers the glans completely but in adults it may not. During erection, the degree of automatic foreskin retraction varies considerably; in some adults, when the foreskin is longer than the erect penis, it will not spontaneously retract upon erection. In this case, the foreskin remains covering all or some of the glans until retracted manually or by sexual activity. The foreskin can be classified as long, when the preputial orifice extents beyond the glans, medium, when the preputial orifice is located around the meatus, and short, when most of the glans is exposed. The variation of long foreskin was regarded by Chengzu (2011) as 'prepuce redundant'. Frequent retraction and washing under the foreskin is suggested for all adults, particularly for those with a long or 'redundant' foreskin. Some males, according to Xianze (2012), may be reluctant for their glans to be exposed because of discomfort when it chafes against clothing, although the discomfort on the glans was reported to diminish within one week of continuous exposure. Guochang (2010) states that for those whose foreskins are too tight to retract or have some adhesions, forcible retraction should be avoided since it may cause injury.

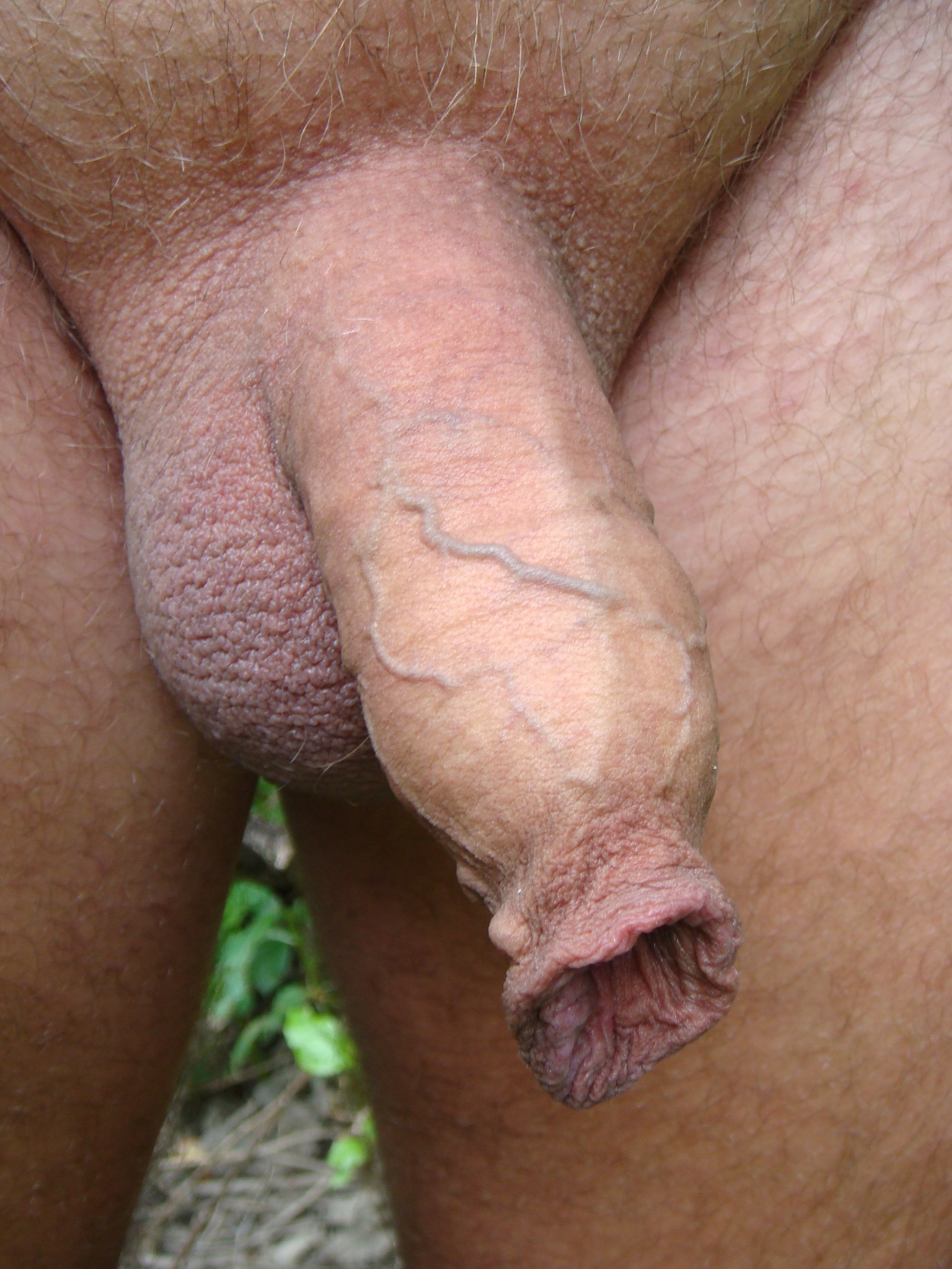
A naturally long foreskin

=== Evolution and function ===
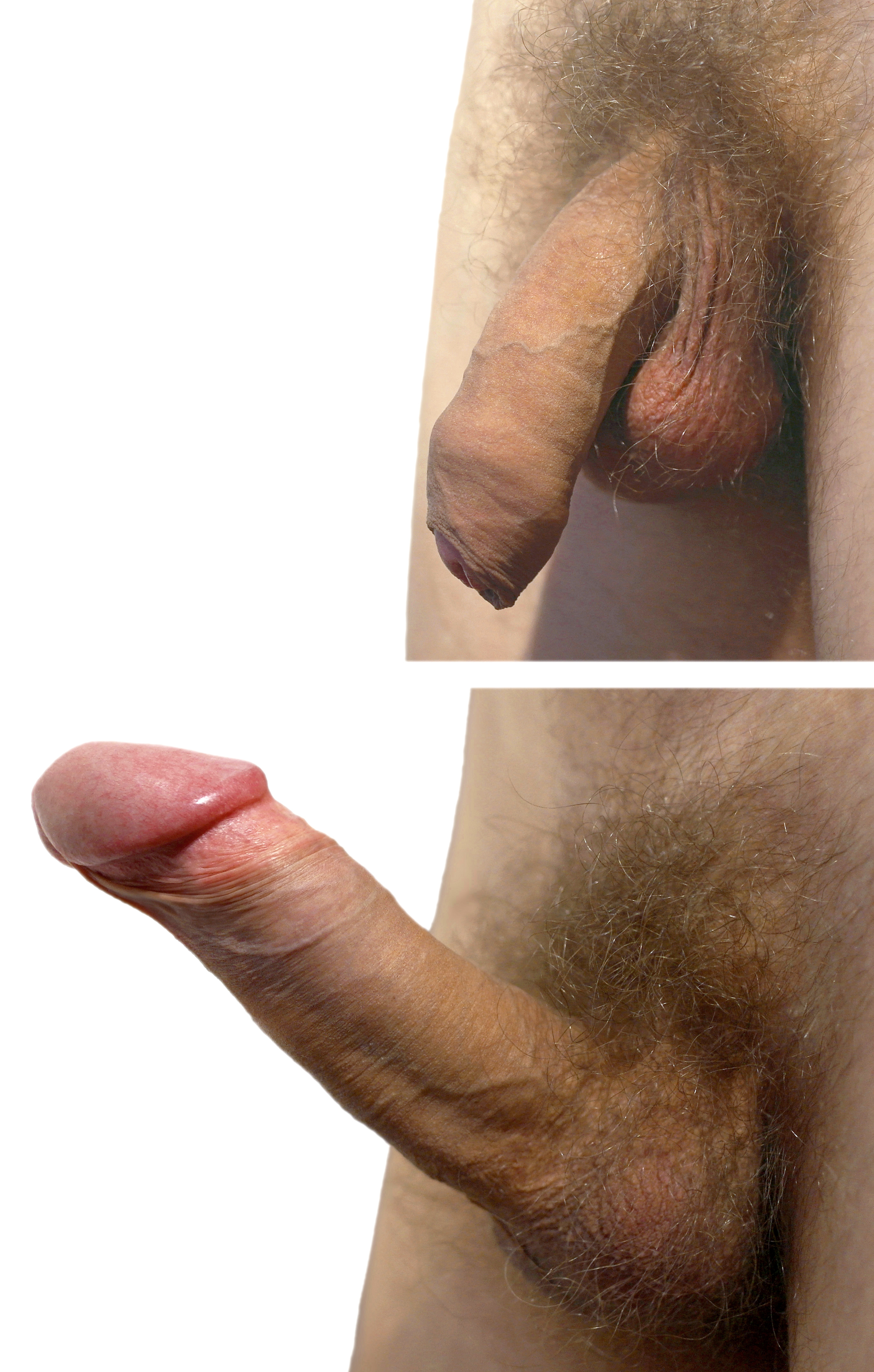
The foreskin typically covers the glans when the penis is not erect (top image), but generally retracts upon erection (bottom image). Coverage of the glans in a flaccid and erect state varies depending on foreskin length.

The foreskin is part of the human phylogenetic heritage and is present in the vast majority of mammals. Non-human primates, such as the chimpanzees, have prepuces that partially or completely cover the glans penis. In primates, the foreskin is present in the genitalia of both sexes and likely has been present for millions of years of evolution.

The World Health Organization (WHO) stated in 2007 that there was "debate about the role of the foreskin, with possible functions including keeping the glans moist, protecting the developing penis in utero, or enhancing sexual pleasure due to the presence of nerve receptors". In 2009, the World Health Organization called it a "myth" that circumcision has an effect on sexual pleasure. The view is echoed by other major medical organizations. The foreskin contains Meissner's corpuscles, which are one of a group of nerve endings involved in fine-touch sensitivity. Compared to other hairless skin areas on the body, the Meissner's index was highest in the finger tip (0.96) and lowest in the foreskin (0.28) which suggested that the foreskin has the least sensitive hairless tissue of the body. The foreskin helps to provide sufficient skin during an erection. In infants, it protects the glans from ammonia and feces in diapers, which reduces the incidence of meatal stenosis. And the foreskin helps prevent the glans from getting abrasions and trauma throughout life.

In modern times, there is controversy regarding whether the foreskin is a vital or vestigial structure. In 1949, British physician Douglas Gairdner noted that the foreskin plays an important protective role in newborns. He wrote, "It is often stated that the prepuce is a vestigial structure devoid of function... However, it seems to be no accident that during the years when the child is incontinent the glans is completely clothed by the prepuce, for, deprived of this protection, the glans becomes susceptible to injury from contact with sodden clothes or napkin". During the physical act of sex, the foreskin reduces friction, which can reduce the need for additional sources of lubrication. The College of Physicians and Surgeons of British Columbia has written that the foreskin is "composed of an outer skin and an inner mucosa that is rich in specialized sensory nerve endings and erogenous tissue". In the March 2017 publication of the Global Health Journal: Science and Practice, Morris and Krieger wrote, "The variability in foreskin size is consistent with the foreskin being a vestigial structure".

== Clinical significance ==
The foreskin can be involved in balanitis, phimosis, sexually transmitted infection and penile cancer. The American Academy of Pediatricians' now expired 2012 technical report on circumcision found that the foreskin can harbor micro-organisms that may increase the risk of urinary tract infections in some infants and contribute to the transmission of some sexually transmitted infections in adults. In some cases of recurrent pathologies, excessive soap washing may irritate the mucosa, therefore washing of the area should be done gently.

Frenulum breve is a frenulum that is insufficiently long to allow the foreskin to fully retract, which may lead to discomfort during intercourse.

Phimosis is a condition where the foreskin of an adult cannot be retracted properly. Phimosis can be treated over time by using topical steroid ointments, gentle manual stretching, or a combination. Using lubricants during sex may also help. For severe cases a surgery such as preputioplasty or circumcision can solve the condition. Posthitis is an inflammation of the foreskin.

A condition called paraphimosis may occur if a tight foreskin becomes trapped behind the glans and swells as a restrictive ring. This can cut off the blood supply, resulting in ischemia of the glans penis.

Lichen sclerosus is a chronic, inflammatory skin condition that most commonly occurs in adult women, although it may also be seen in men and children. Topical clobetasol propionate and mometasone furoate were proven effective in treating genital lichen sclerosus.

Some birth defects of the foreskin can occur; all of them are rare. In aposthia there is no foreskin at birth, in micropathia the foreskin does not cover the glans, and in macroposthia, also called and congenital megaprepuce, the foreskin extends well past the end of the glans.

It has been found that larger foreskins place men who are not circumcised at an increased risk of HIV infection most likely due to the larger surface area of inner foreskin and the high concentration of Langerhans cells.

== Society and culture ==
=== Modifications ===
Preputioplasty: Fig 1. Penis with tight phimotic ring making it difficult to retract the foreskin. Fig 2. Foreskin retracted under anaesthetic with the phimotic ring or stenosis constricting the shaft of the penis and creating a "waist". Fig 3. Incision closed laterally. Fig 4. Penis with the loosened foreskin replaced over the glans.

Circumcision is the removal of the foreskin, either partially or completely. It is most commonly performed as an elective procedure for prophylactic, cultural, or religious reasons. Circumcision may also be performed on children or adults to treat phimosis, balanitis, and other pathologies. The ethics of circumcision in children is a source of controversy. Some men use weights or other devices to stretch the skin of the penis to regrow a foreskin; the resulting tissue does cover the glans but does not fully replicate the features of a foreskin. Other cultural or aesethetic practices include genital piercings involving the foreskin and slitting the foreskin. Preputioplasty is the most common foreskin reconstruction technique, most often done when a boy is born with a foreskin that is too small; a similar procedure is performed to relieve a tight foreskin without resorting to circumcision.

=== Foreskin-based products ===
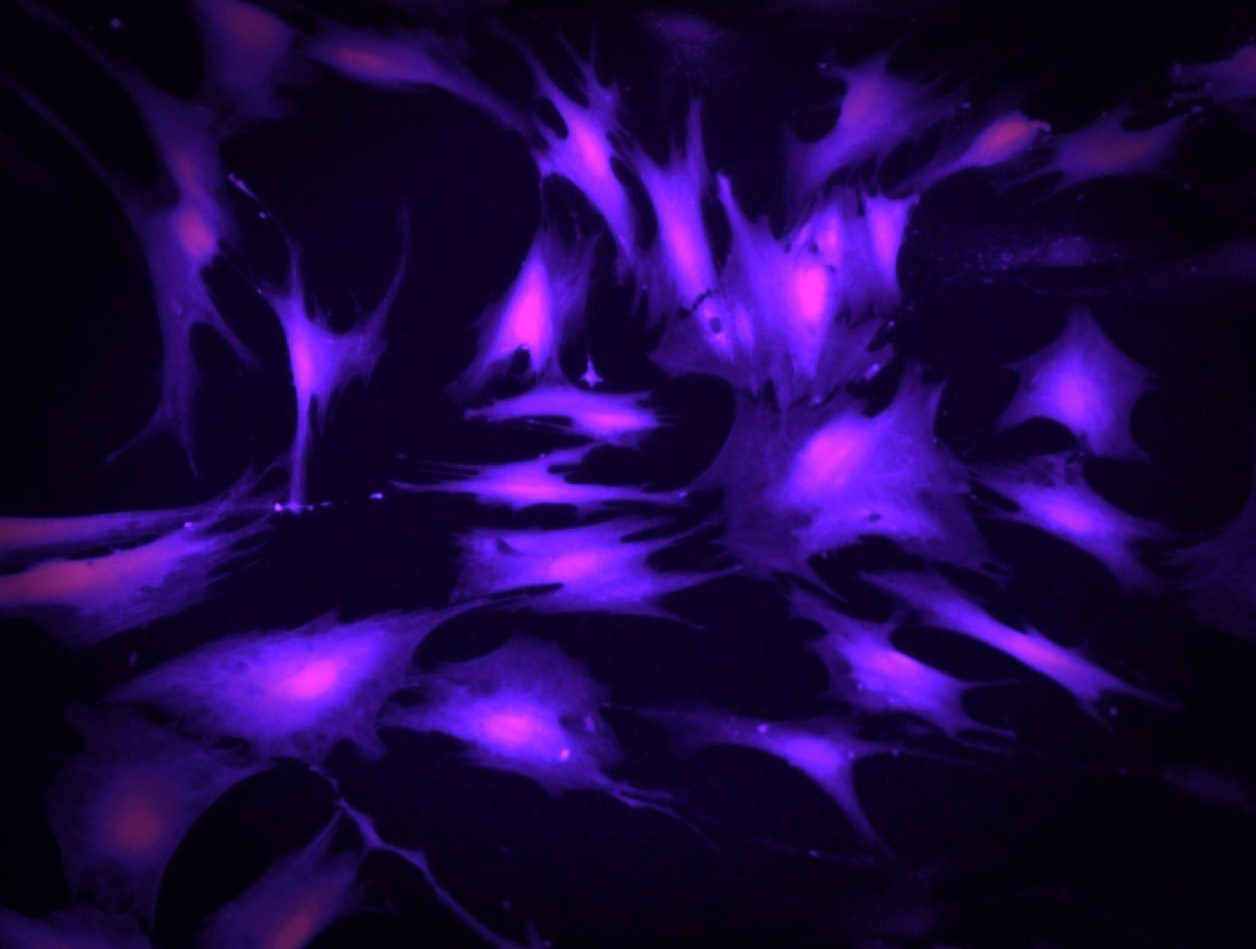
Human neonatal dermal fibroblasts isolated from foreskin stained with calcein-AM. Such cells are commonly used in bioreactor and tissue engineering applications.

Foreskins obtained from circumcision procedures are frequently used by biochemical and micro-anatomical researchers to study the structure and proteins of human skin. In particular, foreskins obtained from newborns have been found to be useful in the manufacturing of more human skin.

Foreskins of babies are also used for skin graft tissue, and for β-interferon-based drugs.

Foreskin-derived fibroblasts have been used in biomedical research, and cosmetic applications.

=== History ===
The foreskin was considered a sign of beauty, civility, and masculinity throughout the Greco-Roman world. Some Jews in the Greco-Roman world undertook epispasm to restore their foreskins once removed to avoid ostracization, as baring one's glans was considered vulgar in that culture. In ancient Greece, foreskins were valued, especially those that were longer. The earliest known illustrative depiction of the foreskin dates back to Egyptian kingdoms.

The foreskin has also been depicted in art from different historical ages:

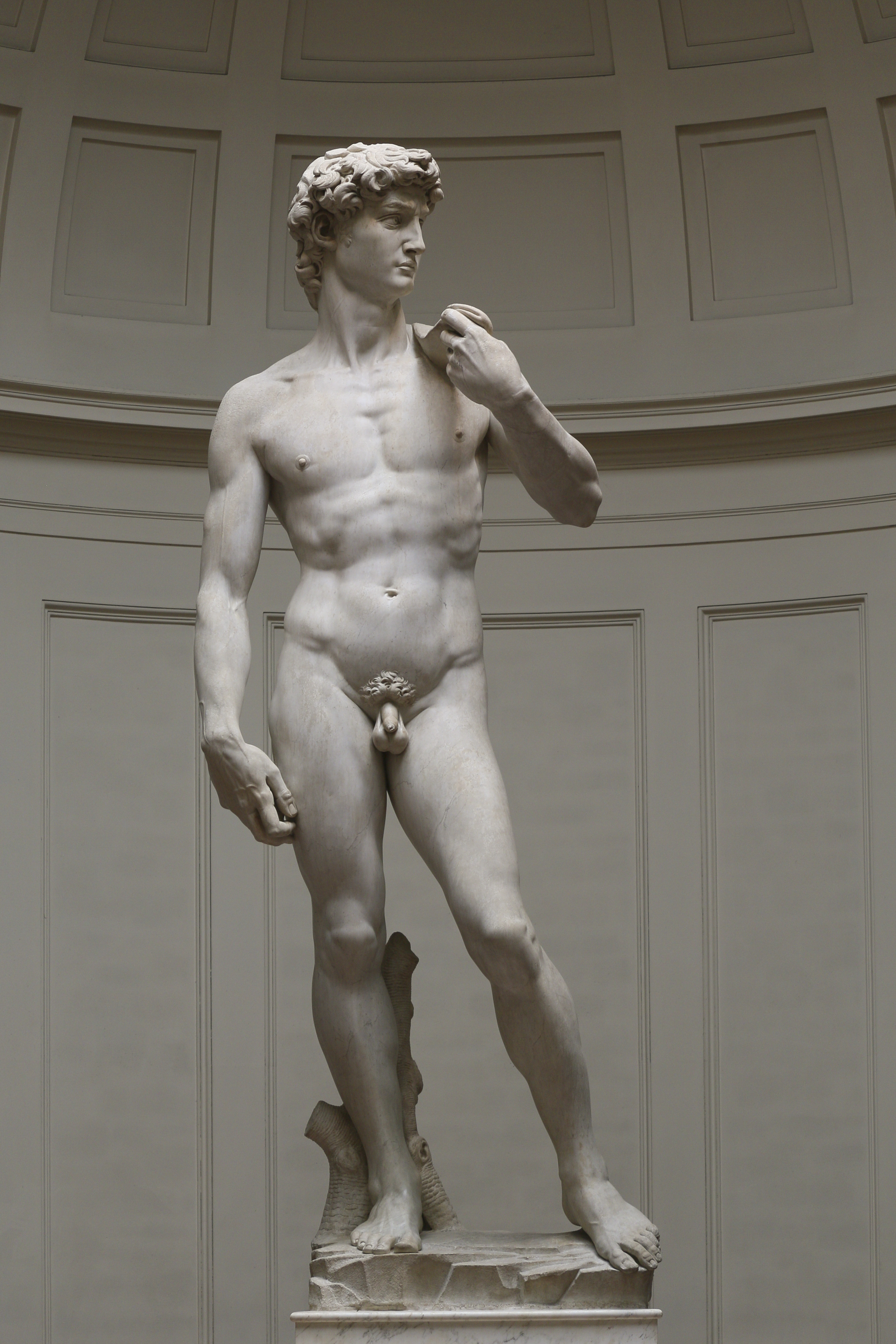
David Marble sculpture, 1504 AD

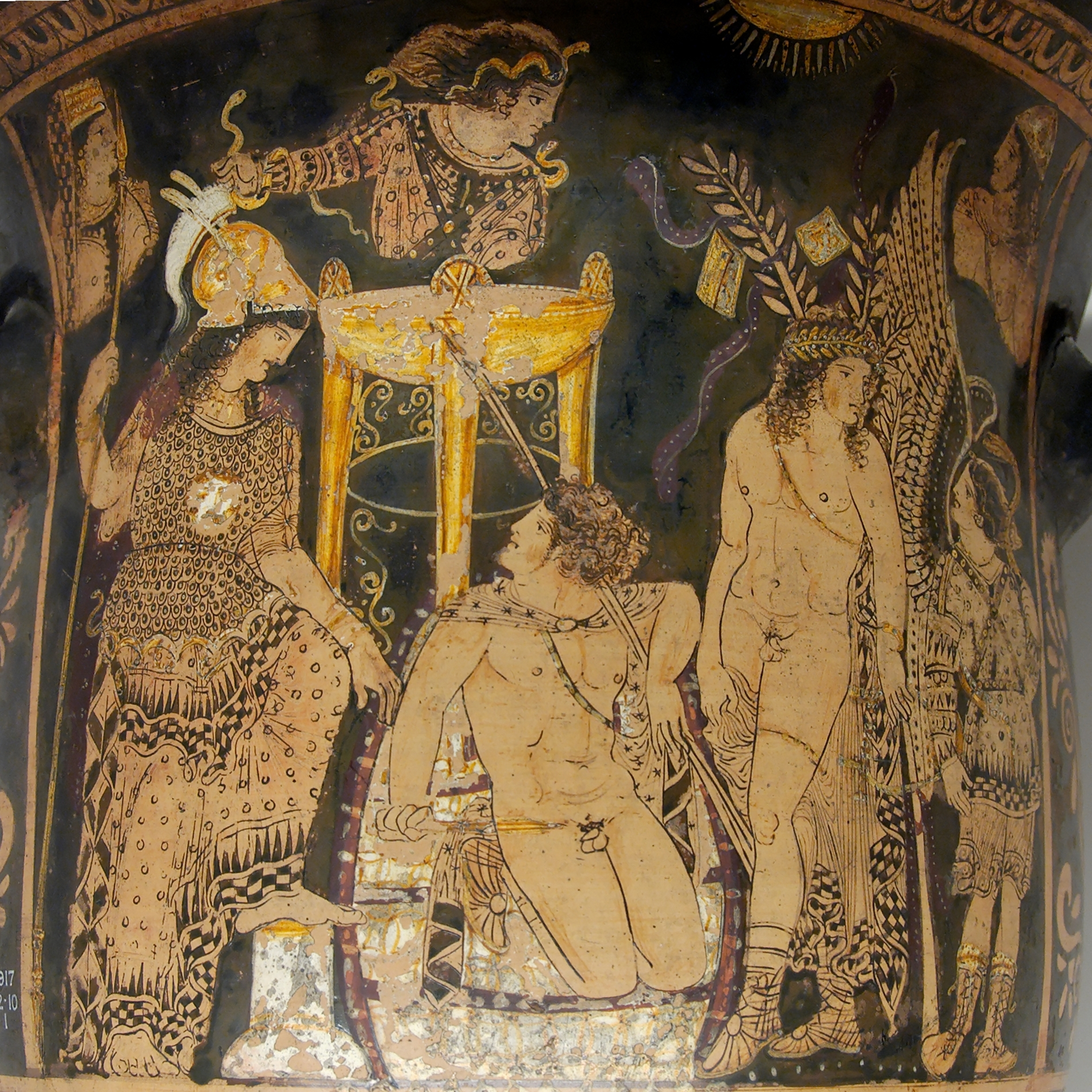
"Orestes at Delphi". Painting of two naked males, ca. 330 BC.

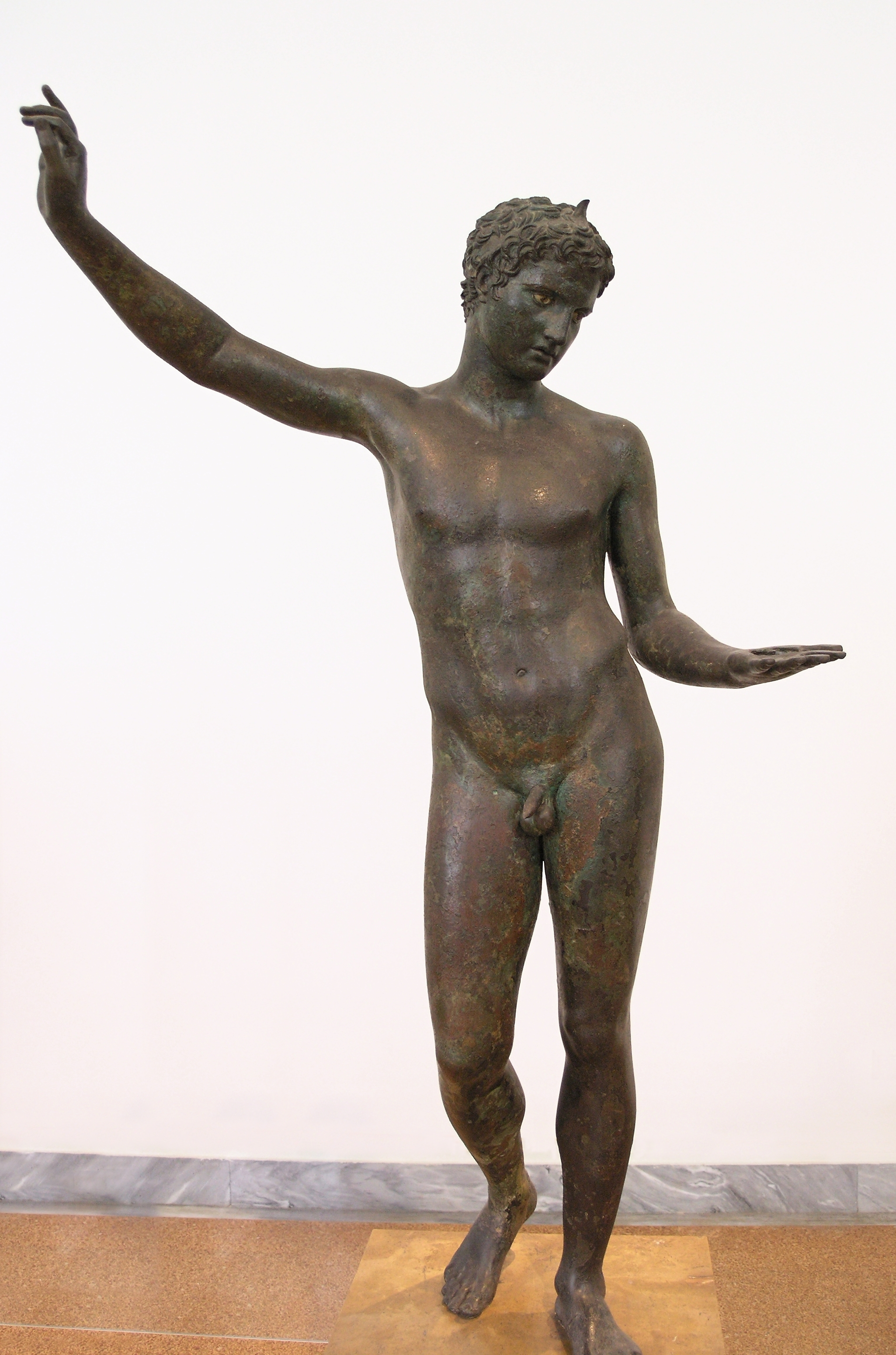
The Marathon Youth, National Archaeological Museum, Athens, ca. 340–330 BC
