= Preputial mucosa =

Epithelium of the inside of the foreskin

The preputial mucosa of the penis is the epithelium of the inside of the prepuce, or foreskin. To differentiate it from the cutaneous skin of the outside of the prepuce, it is sometimes referred to as the inner mucosa. It starts at the ridged band of the prepuce and continues to the coronal sulcus (groove behind the glans penis), where it meets the epithelium of the glans and penile shaft. The preputial mucosa is devoid of hair, as is the cutaneous surface.

Weiss et al. (1993) report the preputial mucosa contains fewer Langerhans cells than most mucosal epithelia. These cells secrete cytokines (proteins that modulate the immune response), and are an essential part of the immune system. Fleiss et al. (1998) point out that Weiss et al. (1993) studied foreskins of neonates and their findings may not be applicable to adults. De Witte et al. (2007) report that Langerhans cells produce Langerin. Langerin inhibits the infection of T-cells with HIV-1.

Dinh et al. (2012) compared the depth of the keratin layer of the inner foreskin with the depth of the keratin layer outer foreskin in foreskins of healthy Ugandan males at the time of their circumcision. The researchers concluded that, "despite inter- and intra-individual variability, keratin thickness was similar in the inner and outer foreskin of healthy Ugandan men, and that reduced keratin thickness is not likely to make the inner foreskin more susceptible to HIV acquisition."

Fleiss et al. (1998) reported the inner mucosa contains apocrine glands, which secrete cathepsin B, lysozyme, chymotrypsin, neutrophil elastase, and hormones such as androsterone. The first four substances have protective immunological functions. However, this view is controversial, and a later histological study reported that the mucosal surface of the prepuce is completely free of lanugo hair follicles, apocrine and sebaceous glands.
